= 2008 Philadelphia Eagles season =

76th season in franchise history

- Owner: Jeffrey Lurie
- General manager: Tom Heckert Jr.
- Head coach: Andy Reid
- Offensive coordinator: Marty Mornhinweg
- Defensive coordinator: Jim Johnson
- Home stadium: Lincoln Financial Field

Results
- Record: 9–6–1
- Division place: 2nd NFC East
- Playoffs: Won Wild Card Playoffs (at Vikings) 26–14; Won Divisional Playoffs (at Giants) 23–11; Lost NFC Championship (at Cardinals) 25–32
- Pro Bowlers: CB Asante Samuel; FS Brian Dawkins

The 2008 Philadelphia Eagles season was the franchise's 76th season in the National Football League (NFL), and the tenth under head coach Andy Reid. The Eagles improved upon their 8–8 record and a fourth-place finish in the NFC East in the 2007 season by going 9–6–1 and earning the 6th seed in the NFC Playoffs. The Eagles defeated the Minnesota Vikings 26–14 in the wild-card round. Philadelphia then upset the top-seeded New York Giants, 23–11 in the divisional round to advance to the NFC Championship Game for the first time since the 2004 season. However, the Eagles' season would end in Arizona with a 32–25 loss to the Arizona Cardinals. This would be the last season in which the Eagles would win a playoff game until their Super Bowl LII-winning season nine years later.

Despite their low-seeding in the NFC playoffs, Football Outsiders calculated that the 2008 Eagles were the best team in the league, play-for-play.

The 2008 Eagles were featured in the film adaptation of Silver Linings Playbook, although the novel focuses on the 2006 team.

== Offseason ==
Though the Eagles finished the 2007 season strong, winning their final three games, they finished 8–8 and in last place in a tough division. In the off-season, the Eagles signed cornerback Asante Samuel from the New England Patriots on February 29, 2008, the first day he became available. Samuel, signed to a six-year, $57 million contract, was considered one of the top players available in free agency, and was Philadelphia's largest signing since Terrell Owens in 2004. The Eagles also signed defensive end Chris Clemons, and gave him a sizable signing bonus, but he struggled with injuries in the preseason, and barely made the team. Oft-injured defensive lineman Jevon Kearse returned to the Tennessee Titans and Takeo Spikes was released, with a young corps of linebackers ready to replace him. Tight end L.J. Smith, who has battled injury, was given a franchise tag to keep him in Philadelphia.

In the draft, the Eagles traded down again, lining themselves up with two first-round picks in 2009. Training camp and the preseason were mixed with good news and bad news. On the negative side, All-Pro guard Shawn Andrews had a late-start to the preseason because of a personal battle with depression. Cornerback Lito Sheppard now looked like a third wheel in the secondary behind Samuel and Sheldon Brown, and vented his frustration. A contract dispute with star running back Brian Westbrook also looked to be another distraction until the team signed him to a three-year, $21 million extension. Philadelphia's biggest issue was the weak receiving corps. In the spring, the team was unsuccessful in acquiring a big name receiver, and the situation was exacerbated when number one receiver Kevin Curtis went down with a sports hernia in the preseason, while number two receiver Reggie Brown nursed a sore hamstring. No moves were made to fix the problem, and many experts considered the Eagles too weak at the position to go deep into the playoffs. However, 5'10 second round draft pick DeSean Jackson had a great preseason, and was named as a Week 1 starter for the Eagles at receiver. Quarterback Donovan McNabb also had a strong preseason, and finally looked fully recovered from his 2006 knee surgery. The rebuilt special teams unit impressed in the preseason, with draft picks Jackson and Quintin Demps returning a punt and a kick respectively for touchdowns in an exhibition win over the Patriots.

The offense went into the season with Westbrook in his prime and a seemingly rejuvenated McNabb, but the offense struggled with injuries and consistency. The defense had a secondary featuring Samuel, Brown, Sheppard, and veteran safety Brian Dawkins. The linebacking corps was younger, and Trent Cole was on the defensive line. Possibly the most key improvement in the team over 2007 lies in the special teams, which was a consistent weakness the previous season.

=== Notable roster additions ===
- CB Asante Samuel- Signed as a free agent from the New England Patriots.
- DE Chris Clemons- Signed as a free agent from the Oakland Raiders.
- DT/FB Dan Klecko – Signed as a free agent from the Indianapolis Colts.
- TE L.J. Smith – Signed his franchise tag tender.
- FB Luke Lawton- Traded from the Indianapolis Colts for a 2009 conditional draft pick.

=== Notable roster losses ===
- LB Takeo Spikes – Signed with 49ers During Free Agency
- CB William James- Signed with Bills During Free Agency
- DE Jevon Kearse – Signed with Titans During Free Agency
- FB Thomas Tapeh – Signed with Vikings During Free Agency

=== Philadelphia Eagles Draft ===
2008 Philadelphia Eagles draft
| Round | Pick | Player | Position | College | Notes |
| 2 | 47 | Trevor Laws | DT | Notre Dame | From Minnesota |
| 2 | 49 | DeSean Jackson * | WR | California | |
| 3 | 80 | Bryan Smith | DE | McNeese State | |
| 4 | 109 | Mike McGlynn | G | Pittsburgh | From Carolina |
| 4 | 117 | Quintin Demps | S | UTEP | From Minnesota |
| 4 | 131 | Jack Ikegwuonu | CB | Wisconsin | |
| 6 | 184 | Mike Gibson | OT | California | |
| 6 | 200 | Joe Mays | LB | North Dakota State | Compensatory Pick |
| 6 | 203 | Andy Studebaker | DE | Wheaton | Compensatory Pick |
| 7 | 230 | King Dunlap | OT | Auburn | From Seattle |
Made roster † Pro Football Hall of Fame * Made at least one Pro Bowl during career

== Staff ==
Philadelphia Eagles 2008 staff
| Front office: Chairman/CEO – Jeffrey Lurie; President/coo – Joe Banner; General manager – Tom Heckert Jr.; Vice president of player personnel – Howie Roseman; Director of college scouting – Ryan Grigson; Director of pro personnel – Jon Sandusky; Head coaches: Head coach – Andy Reid; Assistant head coach/offensive coordinator – Marty Mornhinweg; Offensive coaches: Quarterbacks – Pat Shurmur; Running backs – Ted Williams; Wide receivers – David Culley; Tight ends – Tom Melvin; Offensive line – Juan Castillo; Offensive assistant – Mark Whipple; Offensive quality control – James Urban; Statistical analysis coordinator – Mike Frazier; Coaching assistant – Corey Matthaei; Coaching intern – Matt Nagy | Defensive coaches: Defensive coordinator – Jim Johnson; Defensive line – Pete Jenkins; Linebackers – Bill Shuey; Secondary – Sean McDermott; Assistant secondary – Otis Smith; Defensive quality control – Mike Caldwell; Special teams coaches: Special teams coordinator – Rory Segrest; Assistant special teams/offensive assistant – Jeff Nixon; Strength and conditioning: Head athletic trainer – Rick Burkholder; Head strength and conditioning – Mike Wolf; Assistant strength and conditioning – Barry Rubin |

== Roster ==
2008 Philadelphia Eagles roster
| Quarterbacks (QB): 14 A. J. Feeley; 4 Kevin Kolb; 5 Donovan McNabb; Running backs (RB): 25 Lorenzo Booker; 28 Correll Buckhalter; 32 Kyle Eckel FB; 36 Brian Westbrook; Wide receivers (WR): 81 Jason Avant; 84 Hank Baskett; 86 Reggie Brown; 80 Kevin Curtis; 10 DeSean Jackson PR; 83 Greg Lewis; Tight ends (TE): 87 Brent Celek; 89 Matt Schobel; 82 L. J. Smith | Offensive linemen (OL): 73 Shawn Andrews G; 59 Nick Cole C/G; 79 Todd Herremans G; 67 Jamaal Jackson C; 74 Winston Justice T; 77 Mike McGlynn G; 64 Chris Patrick T; 69 Jon Runyan T; 72 Tra Thomas T; Defensive linemen (DL): 95 Victor Abiamiri DE; 97 Brodrick Bunkley DT; 91 Chris Clemons DE; 58 Trent Cole DE; 90 Darren Howard DE; 68 Dan Klecko DT; 93 Trevor Laws DT; 75 Juqua Parker DE; 98 Mike Patterson DT; 63 Bryan Smith DE | Linebackers (LB): 55 Stewart Bradley MLB; 50 Tank Daniels OLB; 96 Omar Gaither OLB; 57 Chris Gocong OLB; 56 Akeem Jordan OLB; 51 Joe Mays MLB; 54 Tracy White OLB; Defensive backs (DB): 24 Sheldon Brown CB; 37 Sean Considine SS; 20 Brian Dawkins FS; 39 Quintin Demps FS; 21 Joselio Hanson CB; 27 Quintin Mikell SS; 22 Asante Samuel CB; 26 Lito Sheppard CB; Special teams (ST): 2 David Akers K; 46 Jon Dorenbos LS; 6 Sav Rocca P | Practice squad: 61 Franklin Dunbar G; 68 Tala Esera G; 23 Jonathan Hefney CB/S; 11 Drisan James WR; 76 Mike Marquardt DT; 17 Shaheer McBride WR; 78 Babatunde Oshinowo DT; 18 Willie Reid WR (IR); 31 Trae Williams CB; Reserve: 65 King Dunlap T (IR); -- Mike Gibson G (IR); 33 Jack Ikegwuonu CB (NF-Inj.); 62 Max Jean-Gilles G (IR); Rookies in italics 53 active, 5 reserve, 8 practice squad |

== Preseason ==
| Week | Date | Opponent | Result | Record | Venue | Recap |
|---|---|---|---|---|---|---|
| 1 | August 8 | at Pittsburgh Steelers | L 10–16 | 0–1 | Heinz Field | Recap |
| 2 | August 14 | Carolina Panthers | W 24–13 | 1–1 | Lincoln Financial Field | Recap |
| 3 | August 22 | at New England Patriots | W 27–17 | 2–1 | Gillette Stadium | Recap |
| 4 | August 28 | New York Jets | L 20–27 | 2–2 | Lincoln Financial Field | Recap |

== Regular season ==
=== Schedule ===
| Week | Date | Opponent | Result | Record | Venue | Recap |
|---|---|---|---|---|---|---|
| 1 | September 7 | St. Louis Rams | **W** 38–3 | 1–0 | Lincoln Financial Field | Recap |
| 2 | September 15 | at **Dallas Cowboys** | **L** 37–41 | 1–1 | Texas Stadium | Recap |
| 3 | September 21 | Pittsburgh Steelers | **W** 15–6 | 2–1 | Lincoln Financial Field | Recap |
| 4 | September 28 | at Chicago Bears | **L** 20–24 | 2–2 | Soldier Field | Recap |
| 5 | October 5 | **Washington Redskins** | **L** 17–23 | 2–3 | Lincoln Financial Field | Recap |
| 6 | October 12 | at San Francisco 49ers | **W** 40–26 | 3–3 | Candlestick Park | Recap |
| 7 | Bye | | | | | |
| 8 | October 26 | Atlanta Falcons | **W** 27–14 | 4–3 | Lincoln Financial Field | Recap |
| 9 | November 2 | at Seattle Seahawks | **W** 26–7 | 5–3 | Qwest Field | Recap |
| 10 | November 9 | **New York Giants** | **L** 31–36 | 5–4 | Lincoln Financial Field | Recap |
| 11 | November 16 | at Cincinnati Bengals | **T** 13–13 | 5–4–1 | Paul Brown Stadium | Recap |
| 12 | November 23 | at Baltimore Ravens | **L** 7–36 | 5–5–1 | M&T Bank Stadium | Recap |
| 13 | November 27 | Arizona Cardinals | **W** 48–20 | 6–5–1 | Lincoln Financial Field | Recap |
| 14 | December 7 | at **New York Giants** | **W** 20–14 | 7–5–1 | Giants Stadium | Recap |
| 15 | December 15 | Cleveland Browns | **W** 30–10 | 8–5–1 | Lincoln Financial Field | Recap |
| 16 | December 21 | at **Washington Redskins** | **L** 3–10 | 8–6–1 | FedExField | Recap |
| 17 | December 28 | **Dallas Cowboys** | **W** 44–6 | 9–6–1 | Lincoln Financial Field | Recap |

Note: Intra-division opponents are in bold text.

=== Game summaries ===
==== Week 1: vs. St. Louis Rams ====
| Quarter | 1 | 2 | 3 | 4 | Total |
|---|---|---|---|---|---|
| Rams | 0 | 0 | 0 | 3 | **3** |
| **Eagles** | 14 | 7 | 10 | 7 | **38** |

at Lincoln Financial Field, Philadelphia

- Game time: 1:02 PM EDT
- Game weather: 79 °F (26 °C) (Sunny)
- Game attendance: 69,144
- Referee: Peter Morelli
- TV announcers (Fox): Kenny Albert, Daryl Johnston, & Tony Siragusa

The Eagles raced out of the gates to dismantle the St. Louis Rams 38–3, their largest opening week margin-of-victory ever. Rookie DeSean Jackson pulled down a 47-yard reception on the second play, and the drive finished with a shovel pass touchdown to Brian Westbrook. Donovan McNabb marched the Eagles down the field again on their second possession, finding L.J. Smith in the back of the end zone to make it 14–0. Late in the second quarter, receiver Hank Baskett beat the coverage and scored on a 90-yard reception (which was also McNabb's second longest career TD pass). Fullback Tony Hunt scored from a yard out in the third quarter. DeSean Jackson's 60-yard punt return set up a short field goal for David Akers, and Philadelphia's lead grew to 31–0. Westbrook added a 6-yard rushing touchdown early in the fourth quarter before St. Louis kicked a field goal to avoid the shutout. McNabb threw for 361 yards and three scores. Jackson, Greg Lewis, and Baskett each had over 100 yards receiving. Westbrook ran for 91 yards and two touchdowns

With the win, the Eagles began their season at 1–0.

==== Week 2: at Dallas Cowboys ====
| Quarter | 1 | 2 | 3 | 4 | Total |
|---|---|---|---|---|---|
| Eagles | 6 | 24 | 0 | 7 | **37** |
| **Cowboys** | 14 | 10 | 7 | 10 | **41** |

at Texas Stadium, Irving, Texas

- Game time: 8:30 PM EDT
- Game weather: 76 °F (24 °C)
- Game attendance: 63,472
- Referee: Terry McAulay
- TV announcers (ESPN): Mike Tirico, Ron Jaworski, Tony Kornheiser, Michele Tafoya, & Suzy Kolber

The Eagles went toe-to-toe with their hated rivals, the Dallas Cowboys, on MNF in the teams' final meeting at Texas Stadium. The game would be high-scoring – filled with exciting plays and seven lead changes. On their opening drive, Philadelphia scored first with kicker David Akers nailing a 34-yard field goal. The Cowboys struck right back with Tony Romo completing a 72-yard touchdown pass to Terrell Owens, who badly beat the Eagles' secondary. Donovan McNabb drove the Eagles' into Dallas territory again, but again settled for a field goal. Dallas immediately answered when rookie Felix Jones returned the kickoff 98 yards for a touchdown and a 14–6 Cowboy advantage. Asante Samuel intercepted Romo on Dallas' next drive, leading to a 6-yard touchdown reception by Brian Westbrook early in the second quarter. Romo fumbled in his own end zone on the first play of the ensuing drive and linebacker Chris Gocong recovered for the touchdown and a 20–14 Eagle lead. However, the Cowboys would respond with Romo and Owens hooking up with each other again on a 4-yard TD pass. The Eagles took over and McNabb connected with rookie DeSean Jackson on a 60-yard play, but his premature celebration cost him what would have been his first career touchdown (as well as a pass-for-touchdown by McNabb). Nevertheless, Westbrook scored on the resulting 1st and goal from the 1-yard line, diving over the pile to put Philadelphia back on top. Akers nailed a 22-yard field goal and Philadelphia had its biggest lead of the night, 30–21. Dallas would end the explosive half with kicker Nick Folk making a 51-yard field goal. In the third quarter, the Cowboys went ahead again as Romo completed a 17-yard touchdown pass to running back Marion Barber. In the fourth quarter, the Eagles would once again retake the lead, at 37–31, with Westbrook's 1-yard touchdown run. Nick Folk's 47-yard field goal made it 37–34 Philadelphia. The critical turnover occurred when McNabb botched a handoff to Westbrook at the Cowboy 33-yard line that Dallas recovered. Romo led his team down the field and Barber rushed it in to the right side, giving Dallas the winning margin at 41–37. Needing a touchdown, Philadelphia had two more possessions, but failed to score. McNabb threw for 281 yards and a score, while Romo had 312 passing yards and three touchdowns. Westbrook found the end zone three times while gaining 103 all-purpose yards. DeSean Jackson again had over 100 receiving yards. The game featured the second most first half points in MNF history (54) and most combined points in the rivalry's history (78). With the loss, the Eagles fell to 1–1.

==== Week 3: vs. Pittsburgh Steelers ====
| Quarter | 1 | 2 | 3 | 4 | Total |
|---|---|---|---|---|---|
| Steelers | 3 | 3 | 0 | 0 | **6** |
| **Eagles** | 0 | 10 | 0 | 5 | **15** |

at Lincoln Financial Field, Philadelphia

- Game time: 4:15 PM EDT
- Game weather: 82 °F (28 °C) (Sunny)
- Game attendance: 69,144
- Referee: Walt Anderson
- TV announcers (CBS): Jim Nantz & Phil Simms

After a turnover, the Steelers scored the first points on a Jeff Reed 37-yard field goal. Brian Westbrook left the game with an ankle injury early in the second quarter, but Correll Buckhalter finished the drive with a 20-yard touchdown catch. The touchdown was the 176th for Donovan McNabb, surpassing Ron Jaworski on the franchise list. The Philadelphia defense began to take over at this point, sacking Roethlisberger six times in the quarter. A fumble recovery by Brodrick Bunkley after a sack led to a David Akers field goal. Pittsburgh would end the half with Reed kicking a 53-yard field goal to make it 10–6. Without Westbrook, the Eagles' offense struggled to score, but the defense continued to shut down the Steelers. An intentional grounding penalty on Roethlisberger from his own end zone resulted in a safety. A diving sack and fumble recovery by Brian Dawkins led to a field goal and sealed the win, giving the Eagles a 15–6 lead. The defense sacked Roethlisberger and Byron Leftwich nine times, forced two fumbles, and intercepted a pass. Punter Sav Rocca also contributed to the second-half shutout with his punts. The Eagles improved to 2–1 with the win.

==== Week 4: at Chicago Bears ====
| Quarter | 1 | 2 | 3 | 4 | Total |
|---|---|---|---|---|---|
| Eagles | 7 | 7 | 3 | 3 | **20** |
| **Bears** | 7 | 14 | 0 | 3 | **24** |

at Soldier Field, Chicago

- Game time: 8:15 p.m. EDT/7:15 p.m. CDT
- Game weather: 65 °F (18 °C) (cloudy)
- Game attendance: 62,099
- Referee: Walt Coleman
- TV announcers (NBC): Al Michaels, John Madden, and Andrea Kremer

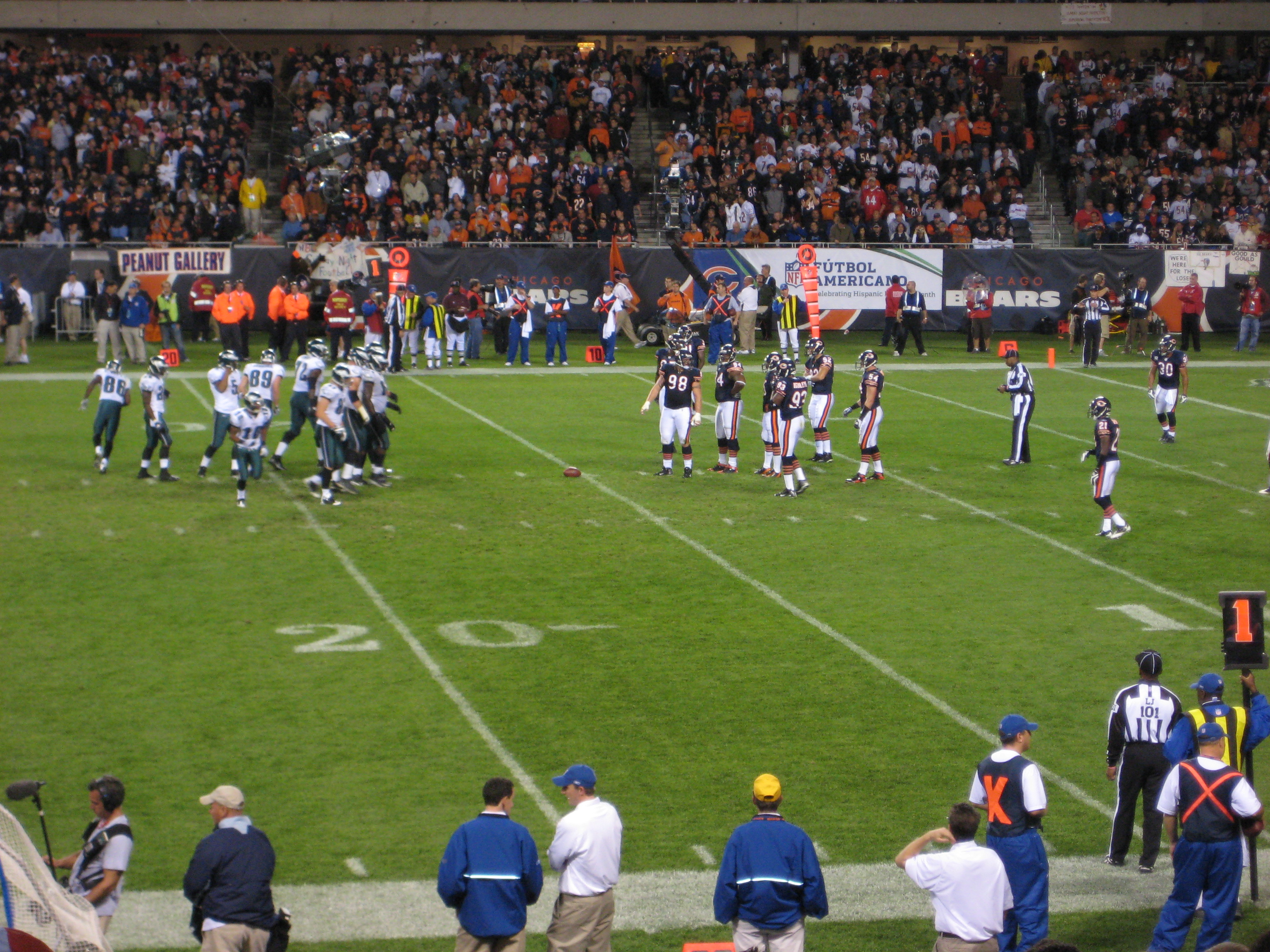
The Eagles and Bears face off at Soldier Field in week 4

Without Brian Westbrook, but coming off their dominant defensive performance over the Steelers, the Eagles flew to Soldier Field for a Week 4 Sunday night duel with the Chicago Bears.

The Bears started quickly, forcing a three-and-out, then scoring on three passing plays. DeSean Jackson was responsible for gaining 66 of the 74 yards traveled on the next drive, including a 22-yard touchdown reception from Donovan McNabb to tie the score. Kyle Orton passed to Marty Booker for a 23-yard touchdown to make it 14–7 Chicago in the second quarter, but the Eagles came right back with a quick drive ending in Correll Buckhalter scoring from a yard out. After a missed 50-yard field goal by David Akers, the Bears used the short field to set up a 20-yard touchdown pass to Devin Hester.

Akers missed another field goal in the third quarter before making two short kicks that came after Kyle Orton fumbled. Robbie Gould booted a 41-yard kick to make it 24–20 Bears in the fourth quarter.

McNabb then took the Eagles down the field, and with 5:40 left to play, Philadelphia had 1st-and-goal from the 4-yard line. Buckhalter got to the 1-yard line on first down, but he and Tony Hunt failed to score on second and third down. Andy Reid went for it on fourth down and Buckhalter was stuffed for no gain. The Bears killed most of the clock on their next drive and the Eagles fell 24–20. McNabb threw for 262 yards. Reggie Brown had 6 catches for 79 yards. The loss made the Eagles 2–2.

==== Week 5: vs. Washington Redskins ====
| Quarter | 1 | 2 | 3 | 4 | Total |
|---|---|---|---|---|---|
| **Redskins** | 0 | 9 | 7 | 7 | **23** |
| Eagles | 14 | 0 | 0 | 3 | **17** |

at Lincoln Financial Field, Philadelphia

- Game time: 1:00 PM EDT
- Game weather: 71 °F (22 °C) (Sunny)
- Game attendance: 69,144
- Referee: Gene Steratore
- TV announcers (Fox): Joe Buck, Troy Aikman, & Pam Oliver

The Eagles dropped a divisional matchup to a Washington Redskins team that was coming off an upset win over the Dallas Cowboys. Philadelphia enjoyed a fast start, with Donovan McNabb marching the Eagles on a 12-play opening drive, ending with a 9-yard touchdown by Brian Westbrook. After a Washington three-and-out, DeSean Jackson reversed the field and returned a punt 68 yards for a touchdown to give Philadelphia a 14–0 advantage. After a 50-yard field goal miss by David Akers on Philadelphia's next drive, the Redskins began their comeback. They chipped away at the lead with three second-quarter field goals by Shaun Suisham. In the third quarter, Washington took the lead on a trick play, with receiver Antwaan Randle El completing an 18-yard touchdown pass to tight end Chris Cooley. Clinton Portis scored on a 4-yard run for Washington, making it 23–14. Midway through the final quarter, the Eagles had 2nd and 1 from the Washington 2-yard line, but were forced to settle for a field goal. A successful fourth down conversion by Portis ended the game. The Philadelphia running defense gave up 203 yards, 144 of them to Portis. Westbrook learned after the game that he had broken his ribs during the first quarter. With the loss, Philadelphia fell to 2–3 in the NFC East.

==== Week 6: at San Francisco 49ers ====
| Quarter | 1 | 2 | 3 | 4 | Total |
|---|---|---|---|---|---|
| **Eagles** | 7 | 10 | 0 | 23 | **40** |
| 49ers | 6 | 10 | 10 | 0 | **26** |

at Bill Walsh Field at Candlestick Park, San Francisco

- Game time: 4:15 PM EDT
- Game weather: 64 °F (18 °C) (Sunny)
- Game attendance: 67,640
- Referee: Ron Winter
- TV announcers (Fox): Sam Rosen, Tim Ryan, & Don Tollefson

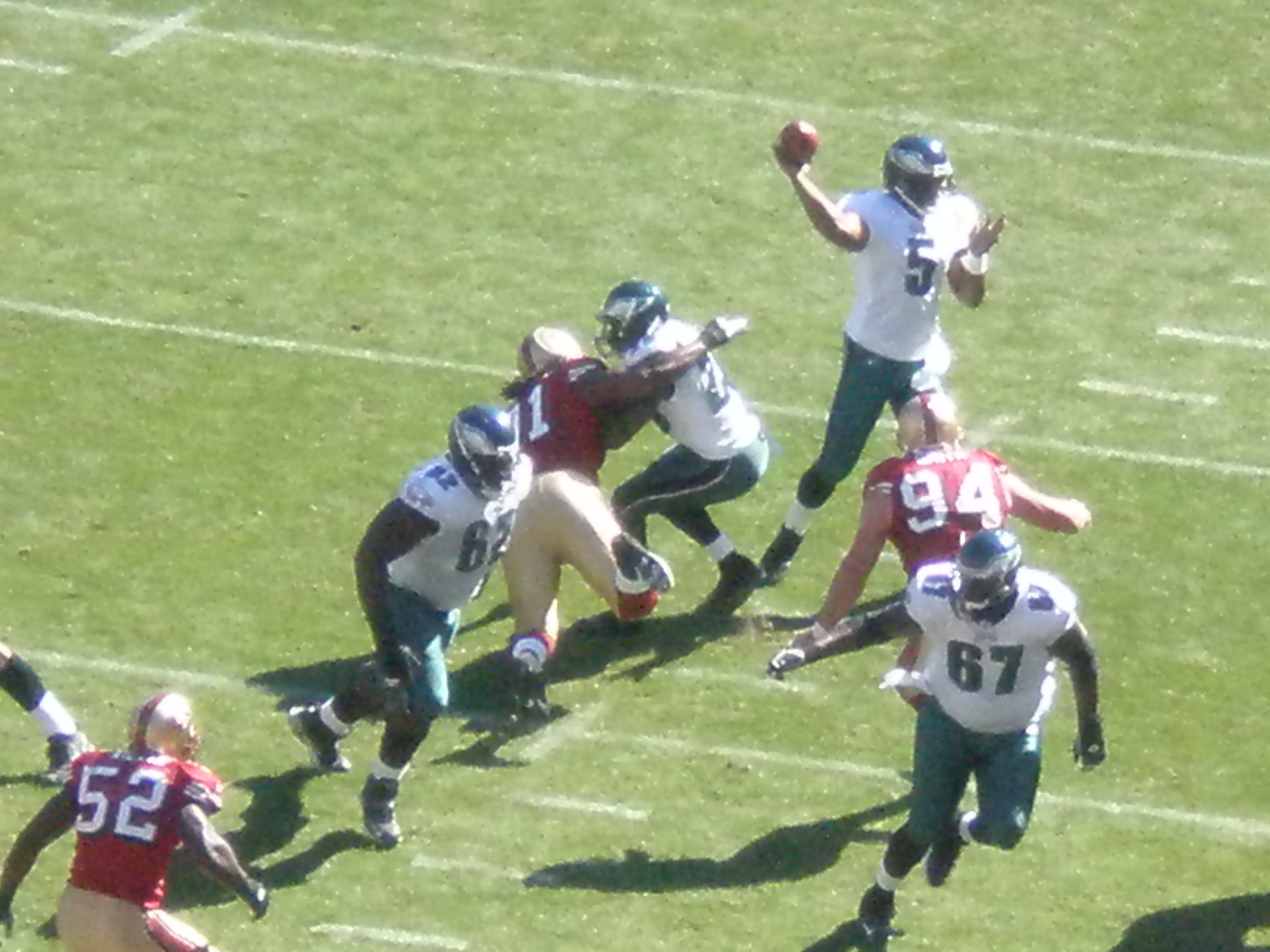
McNabb about to throw a touchdown pass

Playing without several offensive starters, the Eagles pulled out a 40–26 win with a gutsy fourth quarter comeback against the San Francisco 49ers. Following a 49ers field goal, the Eagles capitalized on a big kickoff return by Quintin Demps to eventually score on a Correll Buckhalter 1-yard run. San Francisco kicked another field goal to close to 7–6, but Donovan McNabb connected with Hank Baskett on a 2-yard fade pass for a touchdown early in the second quarter. A chip shot field goal by David Akers gave Philadelphia a 17–6 lead, but 49ers kicker Joe Nedney made a 53-yarder on the next drive to make it 17–9. Just before halftime, Akers attempted a long 54-yard attempt, but the kick was blocked and returned for a touchdown by San Francisco. On their first drive of the third quarter, the 49ers drove down the field and took the lead 23–17 on a 6-yard run by Frank Gore. Nedney added another field goal and it was 26–17 49ers going into the fourth quarter. McNabb led the Eagles on a scoring drive, finding tight end L.J. Smith in the middle of the endzone for the touchdown. The Philadelphia defense began to smother the San Francisco attack, and the Eagles got the ball back and retook the lead on a 38-yard Akers field goal. An interception by safety Quintin Mikell led to another Philadelphia field goal, making it 30–26. A fumble recovery by defensive lineman Chris Clemons resulted in another Akers field goal. With Philadelphia up by seven points, Juqua Parker intercepted San Francisco's J. T. O'Sullivan and returned it for a touchdown. McNabb threw for a pair of touchdowns and 279 yards. Buckhalter had a huge game, rushing for 97 yards and a touchdown, and catching seven passes for 89 yards. DeSean Jackson added 94 receiving yards. With the win, the Eagles entered their bye week at 3–3.

==== Week 8: vs Atlanta Falcons ====
| Quarter | 1 | 2 | 3 | 4 | Total |
|---|---|---|---|---|---|
| Falcons | 0 | 7 | 0 | 7 | **14** |
| **Eagles** | 0 | 10 | 7 | 10 | **27** |

at Lincoln Financial Field, Philadelphia

- Game time: 1:00 PM EDT
- Game weather: 63 °F (17 °C) (Sunny)
- Game attendance: 69,144
- Referee: Jerome Boger
- TV announcers (Fox): Sam Rosen, Tim Ryan, & Chris Myers

The Eagles improved to 10–0 after the bye under Andy Reid with a 27–14 victory over the 4–2 Atlanta Falcons. The Eagles offense struggled to get into a rhythm through the first quarter and a half, with Donovan McNabb misfiring on several passes. Atlanta scored first with a 55-yard catch and run from Matt Ryan to Roddy White. The Eagles tied the score when McNabb capped off a long drive with a 3-yard quarterback draw for a touchdown. Philadelphia drove down the field and scored on a 36-yard David Akers field goal in just 45 seconds before halftime. The Eagles continued to roll on their opening possession of the third quarter, scoring on a 16-yard run by Brian Westbrook to open up a 17–7 lead. Atlanta drove to the Philadelphia 1-yard line in the third quarter, but Lito Sheppard intercepted a fade to the end zone. In the fourth quarter, Philadelphia's offense failed to capitalize on yet another goal line situation, and instead settled for a field goal, giving Atlanta hope. The Falcons responded with an impressive drive that ended in a touchdown pass to Roddy White, making it 20–14. The Eagles went three and out and punted, but the officials ruled the punt was muffed by Adam Jennings and recovered by the Eagles. Atlanta, out of timeouts, could not challenge the controversial call, and two plays later Westbrook broke a 39-yard touchdown to the left side to put the game away. Westbrook rushed for 167 yards and two touchdowns and had 42 receiving yards. McNabb had 253 passing yards and also ran for 25 yards. The win was the 100th of Reid's career and the 500th in the history of the franchise.

With the win, the Eagles improved to 4–3.

==== Week 9: at Seattle Seahawks ====
| Quarter | 1 | 2 | 3 | 4 | Total |
|---|---|---|---|---|---|
| **Eagles** | 0 | 14 | 6 | 6 | **26** |
| Seahawks | 7 | 0 | 0 | 0 | **7** |

at Qwest Field, Seattle

- Game time: 4:15 PM EDT
- Game weather: 58 °F (14 °C) (Cloudy)
- Game attendance: 68,055
- Referee: Mike Carey
- TV announcers (Fox): Dick Stockton, Brian Baldinger, & Laura Okmin

Philadelphia shook off a shaky start and cruised to a 26–7 victory over a banged-up Seattle Seahawks team. Seattle scored on their first play from scrimmage on a 90-yard reception by Koren Robinson, but did not threaten the rest of the game. Robinson beat Lito Sheppard and Brian Dawkins missed the tackle as the Seahawks jumped out to a 7–0 lead. Donovan McNabb had another ugly start, firing incompletions on his first seven pass attempts. However, in the second quarter, the Eagles began to move the ball and McNabb found Reggie Brown for a 22-yard touchdown. On the next drive, with first and goal, the Eagles ran a play-action fake and McNabb threw it to offensive guard Todd Herremans (who was lined up as a tight end) for a 1-yard touchdown and a 14–7 lead. Philadelphia's next four drives led to David Akers field goals as they sailed to a 26–7 win. The Eagles' defense forced Seattle to punt on their final ten possessions and Darren Howard had two sacks. McNabb finished with 349 yards passing, two touchdowns, and an interception. Backup tight end Brent Celek had the game of his life – finishing with six catches and 131 receiving yards.

With their 3rd-straight win, the Eagles improved to 5–3. This also currently remains the Eagles' latest victory over the Seahawks.

==== Week 10: vs. New York Giants ====
| Quarter | 1 | 2 | 3 | 4 | Total |
|---|---|---|---|---|---|
| **Giants** | 10 | 10 | 7 | 9 | **36** |
| Eagles | 7 | 10 | 7 | 7 | **31** |

at Lincoln Financial Field, Philadelphia

- Game time: 8:15 PM EDT
- Game weather: 48 °F (9 °C) (Clear)
- Game attendance: 69,144
- Referee: Terry McAulay
- TV announcers (NBC): Al Michaels, John Madden, & Andrea Kremer

The Eagles, who had not won on prime time in two years, faced off against the defending Super Bowl champion New York Giants on a Sunday night game at Lincoln Financial Field. Mike Patterson batted up and intercepted Eli Manning, returning the ball inside the New York 10-yard line. Two plays later DeSean Jackson took the direct snap and rushed 9 yards, diving to the pylon for a touchdown less than two minutes into the game. Manning then led the Giants up the field and he found Plaxico Burress for a 17-yard touchdown. The Eagles fumbled the kickoff, and New York cashed in for a field goal. On New York's next drive, Manning capped off another long drive with a short touchdown pass to Kevin Boss to take a 17–7 lead early in the second quarter. A fumble by Giant rusher Brandon Jacobs gave Philadelphia the ball in New York territory. Six plays later, Donovan McNabb completed a 10-yard pass to Jason Avant for an Eagle touchdown. Sam Madison picked off McNabb deep in Eagle territory on the next drive, but the Giants settled for a field goal to make it 20–14. McNabb ran the two-minute drill before the half to get the Eagles a 29-yard field goal before halftime, narrowing the score to 20–17. After a good kickoff return by rookie Quintin Demps, the Eagles navigated the short field for another touchdown, this one a fade to Hank Baskett and a 24–20 Philadelphia lead. The Giants, continuing to have success with their ground game, drove down the field. On a critical 3rd-and-10 from the Eagle 20-yard line, Manning completed a 17-yard pass to Boss, but was flagged for crossing the line of scrimmage. Giants' coach Tom Coughlin challenged the call, and it was reversed, giving New York 1st-and-goal. They scored when Jacobs powered forward on a 3-yard run. Another long Giant drive led to a field goal early in the fourth quarter making it 30–24 Giants. The Giants scored again on their next drive, a 3-yard rush by Jacobs. Andy Reid challenged consecutive plays at the end of the drive, but lost both of them, leaving the Eagles with only one timeout, 9:30 left to play, and a 36–24 deficit (after New York missed on the two-point conversion). A 32-yard completion to DeSean Jackson jump-started the offense, and McNabb hit Kevin Curtis for a 2-yard touchdown on fourth down to keep Philadelphia alive. The Eagles got the ball back with 3:14 left, but could not convert on a 4th-and-1 near midfield to lose the game 36–31. McNabb had three touchdown passes, but Brian Westbrook was limited to just 26 yards on 13 carries. Jacobs rushed for 126 yards and two touchdowns for the Giants. The Eagles fell to 5–4, 0–3 in their division.

==== Week 11: at Cincinnati Bengals ====
| Quarter | 1 | 2 | 3 | 4 | OT | Total |
|---|---|---|---|---|---|---|
| Eagles | 0 | 3 | 7 | 3 | 0 | **13** |
| Bengals | 0 | 10 | 3 | 0 | 0 | **13** |

at Paul Brown Stadium, Cincinnati

- Game time: 1:00 PM EDT
- Game weather: 38 °F (3 °C) (Cloudy)
- Game attendance: 64,633
- Referee: Tony Corrente
- TV announcers (Fox): Kenny Albert, Daryl Johnston, & Tony Siragusa

The Eagles and Cincinnati Bengals played to a controversial 13–13 tie. Donovan McNabb turned the ball over on a sack at the end of the first quarter, leading to a Bengal field goal. A 44-yard catch and run by Correll Buckhalter set up a 42-yard David Akers field goal to tie the score early in the second quarter. McNabb was picked off in Bengal territory with less than two minutes left in the half, and Cincinnati scored four plays later on a 26-yard touchdown reception by T. J. Houshmandzadeh. The Bengals added another field goal early in the third quarter to take a 13–3 lead. Hank Baskett came up with a 57-yard completion, followed by a 4-yard touchdown reception by L.J. Smith to make it 13–10. In the fourth quarter, Philadelphia tied the game on a field goal after a 13-play drive. The offenses struggled throughout the rest of regulation and the game went to overtime. The Eagles won the toss, but the Bengals had the field position advantage throughout most of overtime. Nevertheless, neither team could score. The Bengals had a chance to win on 47-yard field goal attempt by Shayne Graham, but the kick went wide right and the game ended in a tie. McNabb passed for 338 yards and a touchdown, but had three interceptions (all in Cincinnati territory) and a lost fumble. The defense registered eight sacks. This was the first game in the NFL to end in a tie since the 2002 Falcons-Steelers game. It was also played 11 years to the day since the Eagles' last tie game. At the post-game press conference, Eagles quarterback Donovan McNabb infamously admitted he didn't know NFL games could end in a tie.

With the tie, the Eagles fell to 5–4–1, putting them back into last place in the NFC East.

==== Week 12: at Baltimore Ravens ====
Week Twelve: Philadelphia Eagles (5–4–1) at Baltimore Ravens (6–4)

| Quarter | 1 | 2 | 3 | 4 | Total |
|---|---|---|---|---|---|
| Eagles | 0 | 7 | 0 | 0 | **7** |
| **Ravens** | 0 | 10 | 2 | 24 | **36** |

at M&T Bank Stadium, Baltimore, Maryland

- Date: November 23, 2008
- Game time: 1:00 p.m. EST
- Game weather: Sunny, 39 °F (4 °C)
- Game attendance: 71,379
- Referee: Walt Anderson
- TV announcers (Fox): Sam Rosen, Tim Ryan, and Chris Myers
- Pro-Football-Reference.com

Game information

**Second quarter**

- BAL – Matt Stover 44-yard field goal, 3:00. Ravens 3–0. **Drive: 4 plays, 2 yards, 1:30.**
- BAL – Daniel Wilcox 1-yard pass from Joe Flacco (Matt Stover kick), 1:49. Ravens 10–0. **Drive: 3 plays, 6 yards, 0:49.**
- PHI – Quintin Demps 100-yard kickoff return (David Akers kick), 1:37. Ravens 10–7.

**Third quarter**

- BAL – Safety, Jameel McClain blocked punt out of end zone, 6:01. Ravens 12–7.

**Fourth quarter**

- BAL – Matt Stover 42-yard field goal, 14:52. Ravens 15–7. **Drive: 6 plays, 27 yards, 2:25.**
- BAL – Mark Clayton 53-yard pass from Joe Flacco (Matt Stover kick), 11:30. Ravens 22–7. **Drive: 3 plays, 60 yards, 1:36.**
- BAL – Ed Reed 107-yard interception return (Matt Stover kick), 7:24. Ravens 29–7.
- BAL – Le'Ron McClain 1-yard run (Matt Stover kick), 3:10. Ravens 36–7. **Drive: 5 plays, 36 yards, 3:06.**

Top passers

- PHI – Kevin Kolb – 10/23, 73 yards, 2 INT
- BAL – Joe Flacco – 12/26, 183 yards, 2 TD

Top rushers

- PHI – Brian Westbrook – 14 rushes, 39 yards
- BAL – Le'Ron McClain – 18 rushes, 88 yards, TD

Top receivers

- PHI – DeSean Jackson – 5 receptions, 47 yards
- BAL – Mark Clayton – 2 receptions, 76 yards, TD

The Eagles faced off with the Baltimore Ravens in an interconference matchup. Both defenses dominated the first quarter, and in the second quarter, Baltimore forced three turnovers (two interceptions and a fumble) from Donovan McNabb. Ravens kicker Matt Stover booted a 44-yard field goal, while quarterback Joe Flacco completed a 1-yard touchdown pass to tight end Daniel Wilcox. However, rookie Quintin Demps returned the following kickoff 100 yards for a Philadelphia touchdown to make it 10–7 Ravens at halftime. Andy Reid decided to bench McNabb (who was 8-for-18 for 59 yards and two interceptions) and put backup quarterback Kevin Kolb into the game. Kolb also struggled with the Baltimore defense, and the Eagles fell behind 12–7 when linebacker Jameel McClain blocked Sav Rocca's punt into the back of the endzone for a safety. In the fourth, the Ravens kicked another field goal after a Kolb interception, then Mark Clayton took a short slant 53 yards for a touchdown to make it 22–7. Kolb drove Philadelphia to the Raven 1-yard line, but was intercepted in the end zone by Ed Reed, who returned the ball an NFL-record 108 yards for the touchdown. Le'Ron McClain added a 1-yard touchdown run as Baltimore won 36–7. Kolb was 10-for-23 for 73 yards and two interceptions, and Brian Westbrook had 39 yards rushing on 14 carries. The Eagles dropped to 5–5–1.

==== Week 13: vs. Arizona Cardinals ====
| Quarter | 1 | 2 | 3 | 4 | Total |
|---|---|---|---|---|---|
| Cardinals | 0 | 7 | 6 | 7 | **20** |
| **Eagles** | 14 | 10 | 10 | 14 | **48** |

at Lincoln Financial Field, Philadelphia

- Game time: 8:15 PM EDT
- Game weather: 35 °F (2 °C) (Clear)
- Game attendance: 69,144
- Referee: Alberto Riveron
- TV announcers (NFLN): Bob Papa & Cris Collinsworth

Andy Reid waited until Monday afternoon to name Donovan McNabb as his starter for a Thanksgiving Day matchup with the Arizona Cardinals. On the opening drive, the Eagles marched down the field and scored on 5-yard touchdown pass up the middle to Brian Westbrook After Joselio Hanson intercepted Kurt Warner, the Eagles scored again on four runs to Westbrook, the final one being a 1-yard burst up the middle. In the second quarter, the Eagles increased their lead to 21–0 when McNabb hooked up with Westbrook again on a 2-yard touchdown pass. The Cardinals would get on the board with a 1-yard TD pass to Larry Fitzgerald, but Philadelphia closed out the half with kicker David Akers getting a 42-yard field goal. Westbrook scored his fourth touchdown on a 9-yard run in third quarter as Philadelphia made it 31–7. Arizona capitalized on a muffed punt return by DeSean Jackson with a touchdown pass to Steve Breaston (with a failed 2-point conversion). After a Philadelphia field goal, the Cardinals closed to 34–20 when Fitzgerald caught his second touchdown. However, the Eagles pulled away for good with McNabb completing short touchdown passes to DeSean Jackson and Jason Avant. With the win, Philadelphia improved to 6–5–1 and returned to the playoff hunt. McNabb was 27-for-39 for 260 yards and four touchdowns, and Westbrook gained 110 yards rushing, scored two touchdowns on the ground, and two more in the air. McNabb and Westbrook were both given NFL Network's 2008 Pudding Pie Award for their efforts.

==== Week 14: at New York Giants ====
| Quarter | 1 | 2 | 3 | 4 | Total |
|---|---|---|---|---|---|
| **Eagles** | 3 | 7 | 0 | 10 | **20** |
| Giants | 0 | 7 | 0 | 7 | **14** |

at Giants Stadium, East Rutherford, New Jersey

- Game time: 1:00 PM EDT
- Game weather: 35 °F (2 °C) (Mostly Cloudy)
- Game attendance: 79,003
- Referee: Gene Steratore
- TV announcers (Fox): Kenny Albert, Daryl Johnston, & Tony Siragusa

After the win over Arizona on Thanksgiving, the Eagles dealt the 11–1 New York Giants a 20–14 loss in a rematch against the defending Super Bowl champions. Philadelphia would close out the first quarter with kicker David Akers getting a 51-yard field goal, then they blocked an attempt by John Carney early in the next quarter. Brian Westbrook broke a 30-yard touchdown run to make it 10–0. Before halftime, Kevin Dockery returned a blocked Akers field goal attempt 71 yards for a New York touchdown. In the scoreless third quarter, the Eagles held the Giants' offense to six plays. Philadelphia scored in the fourth when Donovan McNabb found Westbrook, who had beaten the coverage of linebacker Antonio Pierce, for a 40-yard touchdown pass. Westbrook carried the ball 11 times on the next drive, which was capped with Akers making a 34-yard field goal to make it 20–7. Eli Manning completed a 1-yard touchdown to tight end Darcy Johnson for New York to close the scoring. Westbrook had 131 rushing yards on 33 carries and a touchdown, as well as six catches for 72 yards and another touchdown. With the win, Philadelphia improved to 7–5–1. This was also the first time McNabb had beaten the Giants since Philadelphia's 2004 season.

==== Week 15: vs. Cleveland Browns ====
| Quarter | 1 | 2 | 3 | 4 | Total |
|---|---|---|---|---|---|
| Browns | 3 | 0 | 0 | 7 | **10** |
| **Eagles** | 10 | 7 | 3 | 10 | **30** |

at Lincoln Financial Field, Philadelphia

- Game time: 8:15 PM EDT
- Game weather: 63 °F (17 °C) (Cloudy)
- Game attendance: 69,144
- Referee: Bill Carollo
- TV announcers (ESPN): Mike Tirico, Ron Jaworski, Tony Kornheiser, Michele Tafoya, & Suzy Kolber

Trying to continue their two-game winning streak and keep their playoff hopes alive, the Eagles hosted the Cleveland Browns on Monday Night Football. The Eagles scored a touchdown on their opening drive – a 14-yard pass from Donovan McNabb to Kevin Curtis. After trading field goals later in the first quarter, the Eagles took a 17–3 lead when Asante Samuel returned an interception 50 yards for a touchdown. On the final play of the half, McNabb was intercepted on a fade pass by Brandon McDonald, who returned the ball all the way to inside the Eagle 5-yard line before being forced out of bounds. David Akers converted a 34-yard field goal in the third quarter to make it 20–3 Eagles. Following another Akers field goal, McNabb found Greg Lewis on a 10-yard touchdown pass, increasing the lead to 30–10. Cleveland's sole touchdown came on an interception return by Brandon McDonald off of Eagle second-string quarterback Kevin Kolb. With the win, the Eagle's winning streak increased to three games, and hopes of a playoff berth continued. Their record went to 8–5–1.

==== Week 16: at Washington Redskins ====
| Quarter | 1 | 2 | 3 | 4 | Total |
|---|---|---|---|---|---|
| Eagles | 0 | 0 | 3 | 0 | **3** |
| **Redskins** | 0 | 3 | 7 | 0 | **10** |

at FedExField, Landover, Maryland

- Game time: 4:15 PM EDT
- Game weather: 42 °F (6 °C) (Sunny)
- Game attendance: 82,412
- Referee: Jerome Boger
- TV announcers (Fox): Joe Buck, Troy Aikman & Pam Oliver

The Eagles came out flat and lost 10–3 to the Washington Redskins in a game that was almost a must-win for them (thanks to the losses by the Cowboys and Buccaneers). After a scoreless first quarter, Redskins kicker Shaun Suisham kicked a 33-yard field goal to send Eagles to halftime with a 3–0 deficit. In the third quarter, Washington cashed in on a fumble recovery deep in Philadelphia territory when running back Clinton Portis scored on a 1-yard touchdown run. The Eagles answered with kicker David Akers nailing a 22-yard field goal to make it 10–3 Washington. With 3:48 to play, Philadelphia's offense mustered up a late-game drive. After a couple of incomplete passes in the direction of DeSean Jackson, a pair of receptions by Brian Westbrook got the Eagles inside the Washington red zone. However, the rally fell short when a pass to wide receiver Reggie Brown only got to the 1-yard line, as Redskins cornerback Fred Smoot and safety LaRon Landry tackled Brown shy of the goal line, allowing time to run out. The Eagles dropped to 8–6–1, and needed a loss by Tampa Bay, either a loss by Chicago or Minnesota, and a win against Dallas to get into the playoffs.

==== Week 17: vs. Dallas Cowboys ====
| Quarter | 1 | 2 | 3 | 4 | Total |
|---|---|---|---|---|---|
| Cowboys | 3 | 0 | 0 | 3 | **6** |
| **Eagles** | 3 | 24 | 17 | 0 | **44** |

at Lincoln Financial Field, Philadelphia

- Game time: 4:15 PM EDT
- Game weather: 62 °F (17 °C) (Cloudy)
- Game attendance: 69,144
- Referee: Scott Green
- TV announcers (Fox): Joe Buck, Troy Aikman, & Pam Oliver

Losses by the Chicago Bears and Tampa Bay Buccaneers earlier in the day gave the Eagles the help they needed and created a situation where the winner between the Eagles and Dallas Cowboys would earn a playoff berth. In the first quarter, the Eagles scored first with a 40-yard field goal from kicker David Akers. The game would soon be tied by Cowboys kicker Nick Folk's 37-yard field goal. In the second quarter, the Eagles took control when quarterback Donovan McNabb found Correll Buckhalter for a 59-yard catch-and-run, then snuck the ball up the middle himself for touchdown. McNabb completed a 4-yard touchdown pass to Buckhalter later in the quarter, then hit tight end Brent Celek for a 1-yard touchdown pass as Philadelphia took a 24–3 lead. A kick return fumble by Pacman Jones with five seconds left in the half allowed the Eagles to close out the half with a David Akers 50-yard field goal. A gadget play where Jason Witten passed 42 yards to Terrell Owens took Dallas into Philadelphia territory, but Brian Dawkins sacked Tony Romo, causing a fumble which was recovered and returned for a touchdown by Chris Clemons. On the Cowboys' next drive, Marion Barber fumbled (Also caused by Dawkins) inside the Eagle 5-yard line, and Joselio Hanson returned the ball 96 yards for a touchdown and it was now 41–3 Eagles. A Chris Clemons sack of Romo caused another fumble, which led to a field goal and 44–3 lead. The Eagles forced five turnovers, Buckhalter had 122 yards from scrimmage, and McNabb had a pair of touchdown passes and one rushing score. Philadelphia ended the regular season at 9–6–1, but more importantly, they had improbably clinched the NFC's #6 seed.

== Standings ==
=== Division ===
NFC East
| | W | L | T | PCT | DIV | CONF | PF | PA | STK |
|---|---|---|---|---|---|---|---|---|---|
| ^{(1)} New York Giants | 12 | 4 | 0 | .750 | 4–2 | 9–3 | 427 | 294 | L1 |
| ^{(6)} Philadelphia Eagles | 9 | 6 | 1 | .594 | 2–4 | 7–5 | 416 | 289 | W1 |
| Dallas Cowboys | 9 | 7 | 0 | .563 | 3–3 | 7–5 | 362 | 365 | L2 |
| Washington Redskins | 8 | 8 | 0 | .500 | 3–3 | 7–5 | 265 | 296 | L1 |

=== Conference ===
NFC
| # | Team | Division | W | L | T | PCT | DIV | CONF | SOS | SOV | STK |
|---|---|---|---|---|---|---|---|---|---|---|---|
Division leaders
| 1 (Note: NY Giants clinched the NFC #1 seed over Carolina based on head-to-head victory.) | New York Giants | East | 12 | 4 | 0 | .750 | 4–2 | 9–3 | .502 | .500 | L1 |
| 2 | Carolina Panthers | South | 12 | 4 | 0 | .750 | 4–2 | 8–4 | .488 | .432 | W1 |
| 3 | Minnesota Vikings | North | 10 | 6 | 0 | .625 | 4–2 | 8–4 | .504 | .431 | W1 |
| 4 | Arizona Cardinals | West | 9 | 7 | 0 | .563 | 6–0 | 7–5 | .486 | .368 | W1 |
Wild Cards
| 5 | Atlanta Falcons | South | 11 | 5 | 0 | .688 | 3–3 | 8–4 | .459 | .403 | W3 |
| 6 | Philadelphia Eagles | East | 9 | 6 | 1 | .594 | 2–4 | 7–5 | .514 | .486 | W1 |
Did not qualify for the postseason
| 7 (Note: Tampa Bay finished ahead of Dallas and Chicago based on better conference record.) | Tampa Bay Buccaneers | South | 9 | 7 | 0 | .563 | 3–3 | 8–4 | .480 | .431 | L4 |
| 8 (Note: Dallas finished ahead of Chicago based on better strength of victory.) | Dallas Cowboys | East | 9 | 7 | 0 | .563 | 3–3 | 7–5 | .498 | .444 | L2 |
| 9 | Chicago Bears | North | 9 | 7 | 0 | .563 | 4–2 | 7–5 | .475 | .365 | L1 |
| 10 (Note: Washington finished ahead of New Orleans based on a head-to-head victory.) | Washington Redskins | East | 8 | 8 | 0 | .500 | 3–3 | 7–5 | .479 | .414 | L1 |
| 11 | New Orleans Saints | South | 8 | 8 | 0 | .500 | 2–4 | 5–7 | .496 | .375 | L1 |
| 12 | San Francisco 49ers | West | 7 | 9 | 0 | .438 | 3–3 | 5–7 | .447 | .286 | W2 |
| 13 | Green Bay Packers | North | 6 | 10 | 0 | .375 | 4–2 | 5–7 | .504 | .365 | W1 |
| 14 | Seattle Seahawks | West | 4 | 12 | 0 | .250 | 3–3 | 3–9 | .498 | .313 | L1 |
| 15 | St. Louis Rams | West | 2 | 14 | 0 | .125 | 0–6 | 2–10 | .533 | .531 | L10 |
| 16 | Detroit Lions | North | 0 | 16 | 0 | .000 | 0–6 | 0–12 | .559 | – | L16 |
Tiebreakers (Note: When breaking ties for three or more teams under the NFL's rules, they are first broken within divisions, then comparing only the highest-ranked remaining team from each division.)

== Postseason ==
=== Schedule ===
| Round | Date | Opponent (seed) | Result | Record | Venue | Recap |
|---|---|---|---|---|---|---|
| Wild Card | January 4, 2009 | at Minnesota Vikings (3) | W 26–14 | 1–0 | Hubert H. Humphrey Metrodome | Recap |
| Divisional | January 11, 2009 | at New York Giants (1) | W 23–11 | 2–0 | Giants Stadium | Recap |
| NFC Championship | January 18, 2009 | at Arizona Cardinals (4) | L 25–32 | 2–1 | University of Phoenix Stadium | Recap |

=== Game summaries ===
==== NFC Wild Card Playoffs: at (3) Minnesota Vikings ====
NFC Wild Card Playoffs: (6) Philadelphia Eagles at (3) Minnesota Vikings – Game summary

| Quarter | 1 | 2 | 3 | 4 | Total |
|---|---|---|---|---|---|
| Eagles | 6 | 10 | 0 | 10 | 26 |
| Vikings | 0 | 14 | 0 | 0 | 14 |

at Hubert H. Humphrey Metrodome, Minneapolis, Minnesota

- Date: January 4
- Game time: 4:45 p.m. EST/3:45 p.m. CST
- Game weather: Played indoors, domed stadium
- Game attendance: 61,746
- Referee: Tony Corrente
- TV announcers (Fox): Joe Buck (play-by-play), Troy Aikman (color commentator), Pam Oliver, and Chris Myers (sideline reporters)

Game information

First quarter

- PHI – David Akers 43-yard field goal, 6:44. Eagles 3–0. Drive: 4 plays, 1 yard, 1:38.
- PHI – David Akers 51-yard field goal, 0:00. Eagles 6–0. Drive: 6 plays, 42 yards, 2:36.

Second quarter

- MIN – Adrian Peterson 40-yard run (Ryan Longwell kick), 11:05. Vikings 7–6. Drive: 8 plays, 78 yards, 3:55.
- PHI – David Akers 31-yard field goal, 7:29. Eagles 9–7. Drive: 9 plays, 59 yards, 3:36.
- PHI – Asante Samuel 43-yard interception return (David Akers kick), 6:34. Eagles 16–7.
- MIN – Adrian Peterson 3-yard run (Ryan Longwell kick), 1:51. Eagles 16–14. Drive: 9 plays, 64 yards, 4:43.

Third quarter

- None.

Fourth quarter

- PHI – Brian Westbrook 71-yard pass from Donovan McNabb (David Akers kick), 6:37. Eagles 23–14. Drive: 1 play, 71 yards, 0:16.
- PHI – David Akers 45-yard field goal, 1:55. Eagles 26–14. Drive: 6 plays, 20 yards, 0:54.

Top passers

- PHI – Donovan McNabb – 23/34, 300 yards, TD, INT
- MIN – Tarvaris Jackson – 15/35, 164 yards, INT

Top rushers

- PHI – Brian Westbrook – 20 rushes, 38 yards
- MIN – Adrian Peterson – 20 rushes, 83 yards, 2 TD

Top receivers

- PHI – Brian Westbrook – 3 receptions, 83 yards, TD
- MIN – Bernard Berrian – 2 receptions, 36 yards

Entering the postseason as the NFC's sixth seed, the Eagles began their playoff run at the Hubert H. Humphrey Metrodome against the #3 seeded Minnesota Vikings. The Vikings, coached by Andy Reid protege Brad Childress, finished the season at 10–6 with an NFC North title. Minnesota's defense was ranked #1 in the league against the rush. The offense featured emerging superstar running back Adrian Peterson, but inexperienced Tarvaris Jackson had taken over at quarterback late in the year and would start in the playoffs.

In the opening quarter, a 62-yard punt return by DeSean Jackson led to a 43-yard field goal by kicker David Akers. Akers converted from 51 yards at the end of the quarter and the Eagles led 6–0. The Vikings struck in the second quarter when running back Adrian Peterson broke a 40-yard touchdown run to the left, giving Minnesota a 7–6 lead. A 34-yard completion by Donovan McNabb to DeSean Jackson set up another field goal for the Eagles. One minute later, cornerback Asante Samuel returned an interception of Tarvaris Jackson 44 yards return for a touchdown (the 4th of his career, which is the most career postseason TD interception returns in NFL history). Peterson carried it in 3 yards for a touchdown late in the half to make the score 16–14 Eagles.

The defenses stiffened in a scoreless third quarter, but the game remained tight. Then, with 6:37 left in the fourth quarter, Brian Westbrook took a screen pass 71 yards for a touchdown to extend Philadelphia's lead to 23–14. Westbrook's play was greatly aided by excellent downfield blocking by the rest of the Eagle offense. The Eagles' recovery of a low shotgun snap to Tarvaris Jackson led to Akers' fourth field goal of the day and a 26–14 lead.

Westbrook had 121 yards from scrimmage, as well as a key touchdown. Tight end Brent Celek chipped in with 6 catches for 56 yards, while McNabb threw for 300 yards a touchdown and an interception. With the win, the Eagles improved their overall record to 10–6–1. Also, Philadelphia improved their Wild Card record under head coach Andy Reid to 4–0.

==== NFC Divisional Playoffs: at (1) New York Giants ====
NFC Divisional Playoffs: (6) Philadelphia Eagles at (1) New York Giants – Game summary

| Quarter | 1 | 2 | 3 | 4 | Total |
|---|---|---|---|---|---|
| Eagles | 7 | 3 | 3 | 10 | 23 |
| Giants | 3 | 5 | 3 | 0 | 11 |

at Giants Stadium, East Rutherford, New Jersey

- Date: January 11
- Game time: 1:00 p.m. EST
- Game weather: 30 °F (−1 °C), partly cloudy
- Game attendance: 79,193
- Referee: Mike Carey
- TV announcers (Fox): Joe Buck (play-by-play), Troy Aikman (color commentator), Pam Oliver, and Chris Myers (sideline reporters)

Game information

First quarter

- NYG – John Carney 22-yard field goal, 9:59. Giants 3–0. Drive: 9 plays, 31 yards, 5:01.
- PHI – Donovan McNabb 1-yard run (David Akers kick), 5:58. Eagles 7–3. Drive: 3 plays, 2 yards, 1:32.

Second quarter

- NYG – Intentional grounding penalty on Donovan McNabb enforced in end zone for a safety, 12:34. Eagles 7–5.
- NYG – John Carney 34-yard field goal, 1:33. Giants 8–7. Drive: 7 plays, 63 yards, 2:25.
- PHI – David Akers 25-yard field goal, 0:00. Eagles 10–8. Drive: 12 plays, 68 yards, 1:33.

Third quarter

- NYG – John Carney 36-yard field goal, 12:33. Giants 11–10. Drive: 5 plays, 16 yards, 1:35.
- PHI – David Akers 35-yard field goal, 7:45. Eagles 13–11. Drive: 12 plays, 58 yards, 4:48.

Fourth quarter

- PHI – Brent Celek 1-yard pass from Donovan McNabb (David Akers kick), 14:56. Eagles 20–11. Drive: 10 plays, 63 yards, 4:24.
- PHI – David Akers 20-yard field goal, 3:58. Eagles 23–11. Drive: 6 plays, 46 yards, 2:30.

Top passers

- PHI – Donovan McNabb – 22/40, 217 yards, TD, 2 INT
- NYG – Eli Manning – 15/29, 169 yards, 2 INT

Top rushers

- PHI – Brian Westbrook – 18 rushes, 36 yards
- NYG – Brandon Jacobs – 19 rushes, 92 yards

Top receivers

- PHI – DeSean Jackson – 4 receptions, 81 yards
- NYG – Kevin Boss – 3 receptions, 52 yards

Coming off their Wild Card road win over the Vikings, the Eagles took a bus up the NJ Turnpike to Giants Stadium for their NFC Divisional duel with their NFC East rival, the top-seeded/defending champion New York Giants. The Giants had defeated the Eagles 36–31 in Week 10, but the Eagles won 20–14 four weeks later in the Meadowlands. It was the start of a skid for New York where they lost three of their final four games after the loss of receiver Plaxico Burress.

Ahmad Bradshaw returned the opening kickoff to the Eagle 35-yard line and the Giants finished the drive with a 22-yard John Carney field goal. On the first play of New York's next drive, Asante Samuel came up with another big playoff interception for the Eagles, returning the ball inside the New York 5-yard line. Donovan McNabb stretched the ball over the plane for a touchdown on a quarterback sneak as Philadelphia took a 7–3 lead. New York punter Jeff Feagles pinned the Eagles deep in their own territory early in the second quarter, and the Giants defense forced McNabb into committing an intentional grounding penalty from his own endzone, giving the Giants a safety. Carney missed from 46 yards on the ensuing New York possession, but he was good from 34 yard on the next possession as New York went ahead 8–7. The Eagles' offense finally got on track on their last possession of the half, driving down the field and getting a 25-yard field goal by David Akers to take a 10–8 lead to the locker room.

New York defensive lineman Fred Robbins came up with an interception of McNabb early in the third quarter, and New York retook the lead on a field goal. Philadelphia responded with an impressive drive highlighted by McNabb finding slot receiver Jason Avant for a 21-yard gain on 3rd-and-20 and running back Correll Buckhalter for 19 yards on 3rd-and-10. The drive ended in a short field goal and the Eagles led 13–11. Carney missed a 47-yarder on the next drive, and the Eagles capitalized with a 10-play drive capped with a 1-yard touchdown pass to tight end Brent Celek. Early in the fourth quarter, on 4th-and-1 from the Giant 44-yard line, Eli Manning was stuffed on a quarterback sneak. On the next drive, the Eagles defensive line stopped Derrick Ward and Brandon Jacobs on third and fourth down. After the ball turned over on downs, McNabb laced a 48-yard bomb to DeSean Jackson. A field goal followed and the Eagles took a 23–11 lead. Quintin Mikell's interception of Manning essentially ended the game.

The Eagles had delivered a big upset and now advanced to the NFC Championship against the Arizona Cardinals. McNabb threw for 217 yards, a touchdown and two interceptions in windy conditions. Brian Westbrook was held to 36 rushing yards, but DeSean Jackson caught four passes for 84 yards. While Jacobs and Ward combined for 138 yards, Manning struggled in the passing game, throwing two interceptions. With the win, the Eagles improved their overall record to 11–6–1.

==== NFC Championship: at (4) Arizona Cardinals ====
NFC Championship: (6) Philadelphia Eagles at (4) Arizona Cardinals – Game summary

| Quarter | 1 | 2 | 3 | 4 | Total |
|---|---|---|---|---|---|
| Eagles | 3 | 3 | 13 | 6 | 25 |
| Cardinals | 7 | 17 | 0 | 8 | 32 |

at University of Phoenix Stadium, Glendale, Arizona

- Date: January 18
- Game time: 3:00 p.m. EST/1:00 p.m. MST
- Game weather: Played with roof closed, retractable roof stadium
- Game attendance: 70,650
- Referee: Walt Anderson
- TV announcers (Fox): Joe Buck (play-by-play), Troy Aikman (color commentator), Pam Oliver, and Chris Myers (sideline reporters)

Game information

First quarter

- ARI – Larry Fitzgerald 9-yard pass from Kurt Warner (Neil Rackers kick), 9:20. Cardinals 7–0. Drive: 9 plays, 80 yards, 5:40.
- PHI – David Akers 45-yard field goal, 4:43. Cardinals 7–3. Drive: 8 plays, 33 yards, 4:37.

Second quarter

- ARI – Larry Fitzgerald 62-yard pass from Kurt Warner (Neil Rackers kick), 13:19. Cardinals 14–3. Drive: 1 play, 62 yards, 0:11.
- PHI – David Akers 33-yard field goal, 9:02. Cardinals 14–6. Drive: 7 plays, 65 yards, 4:14.
- ARI – Larry Fitzgerald 1-yard pass from Kurt Warner (Neil Rackers kick), 3:06. Cardinals 21–6. Drive: 8 plays, 73 yards, 5:56.
- ARI – Neil Rackers 49-yard field goal, 0:00. Cardinals 24–6. Drive: 9 plays, 53 yards, 1:31.

Third quarter

- PHI – Brent Celek 6-yard pass from Donovan McNabb (David Akers kick), 4:08. Cardinals 24–13. Drive: 13 plays, 90 yards, 5:55.
- PHI – Brent Celek 31-yard pass from Donovan McNabb (kick failed), 0:49. Cardinals 24–19. Drive: 6 plays, 61 yards, 2:39.

Fourth quarter

- PHI – DeSean Jackson 62-yard pass from Donovan McNabb (pass failed), 10:45. Eagles 25–24. Drive: 4 plays, 86 yards, 2:15.
- ARI – Tim Hightower 8-yard pass from Kurt Warner (Ben Patrick pass from Kurt Warner), 2:53. Cardinals 32–25. Drive: 14 plays, 72 yards, 7:52.

Top passers

- PHI – Donovan McNabb – 28/47, 375 yards, 3 TD, INT
- ARI – Kurt Warner – 21/28, 279 yards, 4 TD

Top rushers

- PHI – Brian Westbrook – 12 rushes, 45 yards
- ARI – Edgerrin James – 16 rushes, 73 yards

Top receivers

- PHI – Kevin Curtis – 4 receptions, 122 yards
- ARI – Larry Fitzgerald – 9 receptions, 152 yards, 3 TD

Coming off their divisional road win over the top-seeded Giants, the Eagles flew to the University of Phoenix Stadium for the NFC Championship Game against the Arizona Cardinals. On Thanksgiving Night, the Eagles had crushed Arizona 48–20. The Cardinals, who finished 9–7 with losses in four of their last six games, were considered by some experts to be one of the worst playoff teams ever. However, they put together wins over the Atlanta Falcons and the Carolina Panthers behind strong performances by veteran quarterback Kurt Warner and wide receiver Larry Fitzgerald.

The Cardinals marched down the field after the game's opening kickoff and ended the drive with Kurt Warner's 9-yard touchdown pass to Larry Fitzgerald. Donovan McNabb scrambled for 21 yards on Philadelphia's first play, and the drive ended in a 45-yard field goal by David Akers (improving his NFL record for consecutive postseason field goals to 19). Akers missed on the next Eagles' drive, and on Arizona's first play after taking over, Fitzgerald scored on a 62-yard touchdown pass on a trick play to give Arizona a 14–3 second quarter lead. A 47-yard catch and run by Kevin Curtis helped Philadelphia answer with a 33-yard field goal, but the Cardinals would end the half with Warner's 1-yard touchdown pass to Fitzgerald and kicker Neil Rackers' 49-yard field goal to take a commanding 24–6 lead.

The third quarter began with safety Adrian Wilson sacking McNabb on a blitz and Arizona recovering. However, the Eagles' defense held and McNabb began to rally Philadelphia. A 50-yard completion to Curtis jump-started a drive that ended in a 6-yard touchdown pass to tight end Brent Celek to make it 24–13. The Eagles got the ball right back and scored again on a 31-yard touchdown pass from McNabb to Celek, narrowing the score to 24–19 after a failed PAT by Akers. The Cardinals punted again, and with 10:45 left in the fourth quarter, McNabb launched a bomb to DeSean Jackson that he bobbled and then hauled in despite the coverage of Dominique Rodgers-Cromartie. The 62-yard play put Philadelphia ahead 25–24 (after a failed 2-point conversion). The Cardinals began an eight-minute drive (that included a 4th-and-1 conversion) that was capped by an 8-yard touchdown pass to running back Tim Hightower. The successful 2-point conversion by Ben Patrick put Arizona back on top 32–25. The Eagles drove in Arizona territory, but four straight incompletions ended Philadelphia's hopes of a Super Bowl XLIII appearance, as well as an all-Pennsylvania Super Bowl (the Steelers had won the AFC Championship Game over the Ravens later in the day).

With the loss, Philadelphia's season ended with an overall record of 11–7–1. McNabb threw for 375 yards, three touchdowns, and one interception. Curtis had 122 receiving yards, Jackson had 92 receiving yards, and Celek had 10 catches and two touchdowns. However, Brian Westbrook (71 yards from scrimmage) was a non-factor and the defense forced zero turnovers. Larry Fitzgerald, who eventually set a record for receiving yards in a playoff season, had 152 yards, three touchdowns, and dominated the first half.

== Statistics ==
=== Passing ===
| Player | G | QB Rat. | Comp. | Att. | Pct. | Yards | TD | INT | Long | Sack |
|---|---|---|---|---|---|---|---|---|---|---|
| Donovan McNabb | 16 | 86.4 | 345 | 571 | 60.4 | 3,916 | 23 | 11 | 90 | 23 |
| Kevin Kolb | 6 | 21.8 | 17 | 34 | 50.0 | 144 | 0 | 4 | 16 | 0 |
| DeSean Jackson | 16 | 0.0 | 0 | 1 | 0.0 | 0 | 0 | 1 | 0 | 0 |

=== Rushing ===
| Player | G | Att. | Yards | Y/G | Avg. | Long | TD | Fum | FumL |
|---|---|---|---|---|---|---|---|---|---|
| Brian Westbrook | 11 | 192 | 936 | 71.6 | 4.1 | 39 | 9 | 1 | 0 |
| Correll Buckhalter | 11 | 59 | 249 | 22.6 | 4.2 | 28 | 2 | 0 | 0 |
| DeSean Jackson | 13 | 16 | 89 | 6.6 | 5.6 | 21 | 1 | 4 | 2 |
| Donovan McNabb | 13 | 34 | 135 | 10.4 | 4.0 | 17 | 1 | 6 | 4 |
| Lorenzo Booker | 10 | 20 | 53 | 5.3 | 2.7 | 8 | 0 | 0 | 0 |
| Tony Hunt | 6 | 4 | 9 | 1.5 | 2.3 | 6 | 1 | 1 | 1 |
| Reggie Brown | 4 | 1 | 6 | 1.5 | 6.0 | 6 | 0 | 0 | 0 |
| Kevin Kolb | 4 | 9 | 6 | 1.5 | 0.7 | 8 | 0 | 0 | 0 |
| Kyle Eckel | 2 | 7 | 29 | 14.5 | 4.1 | 14 | 0 | 0 | 0 |

=== Receiving ===
| Player | G | Rec. | Yards | Y/G | Avg. | Long | TD |
|---|---|---|---|---|---|---|---|
| DeSean Jackson | 16 | 62 | 912 | 57 | 14.7 | 60 | 2 |
| Hank Baskett | 15 | 33 | 440 | 29.3 | 13.3 | 90 | 2 |
| Greg Lewis | 16 | 19 | 247 | 15.44 | 13 | 52 | 1 |
| Brent Celek | 16 | 27 | 318 | 19.875 | 11.8 | 44 | 1 |
| Correll Buckhalter | 14 | 26 | 324 | 23.14 | 12.5 | 59 | 2 |
| Reggie Brown | 10 | 18 | 252 | 25.2 | 14 | 40 | 1 |
| Brian Westbrook | 14 | 54 | 402 | 28.71 | 7.4 | 47 | 5 |
| Jason Avant | 15 | 32 | 377 | 25.1 | 11.8 | 31 | 2 |
| Kevin Curtis | 9 | 33 | 390 | 43.33 | 11.8 | 32 | 2 |
| L. J. Smith | 6 | 12 | 106 | 17.7 | 8.8 | 21 | 2 |
| Tony Hunt | 6 | 6 | 42 | 7.0 | 7.0 | 18 | 0 |
| Lorenzo Booker | 8 | 5 | 10 | 1.3 | 2.0 | 8 | 0 |
| Matt Schobel | 4 | 2 | 10 | 2.5 | 5.0 | 5 | 0 |
| Dan Klecko | 8 | 1 | 2 | 0.3 | 2.0 | 2 | 0 |
| Todd Herremans | 8 | 1 | 1 | 0.1 | 1.0 | 1 | 1 |

=== Kicking ===
| Player | G | 0–19 | 20–29 | 30–39 | 40–49 | 50+ | FGM | FGA | Pct. | Long | XPM | XPA |
|---|---|---|---|---|---|---|---|---|---|---|---|---|
| David Akers | 8 | 2–2 | 7–7 | 8–8 | 2–3 | 0–3 | 19 | 23 | 82.6 | 60 | 23 | 23 |

=== Punting ===
| Player | G | Punt | Yards | Avg. | In20 | In10 | TB | Long |
|---|---|---|---|---|---|---|---|---|
| Sav Rocca | 16 | 77 | 3334 | 43.3 | 24 | 7 | 4 | 65 |
