= Asante Samuel =

American football player (born 1981)

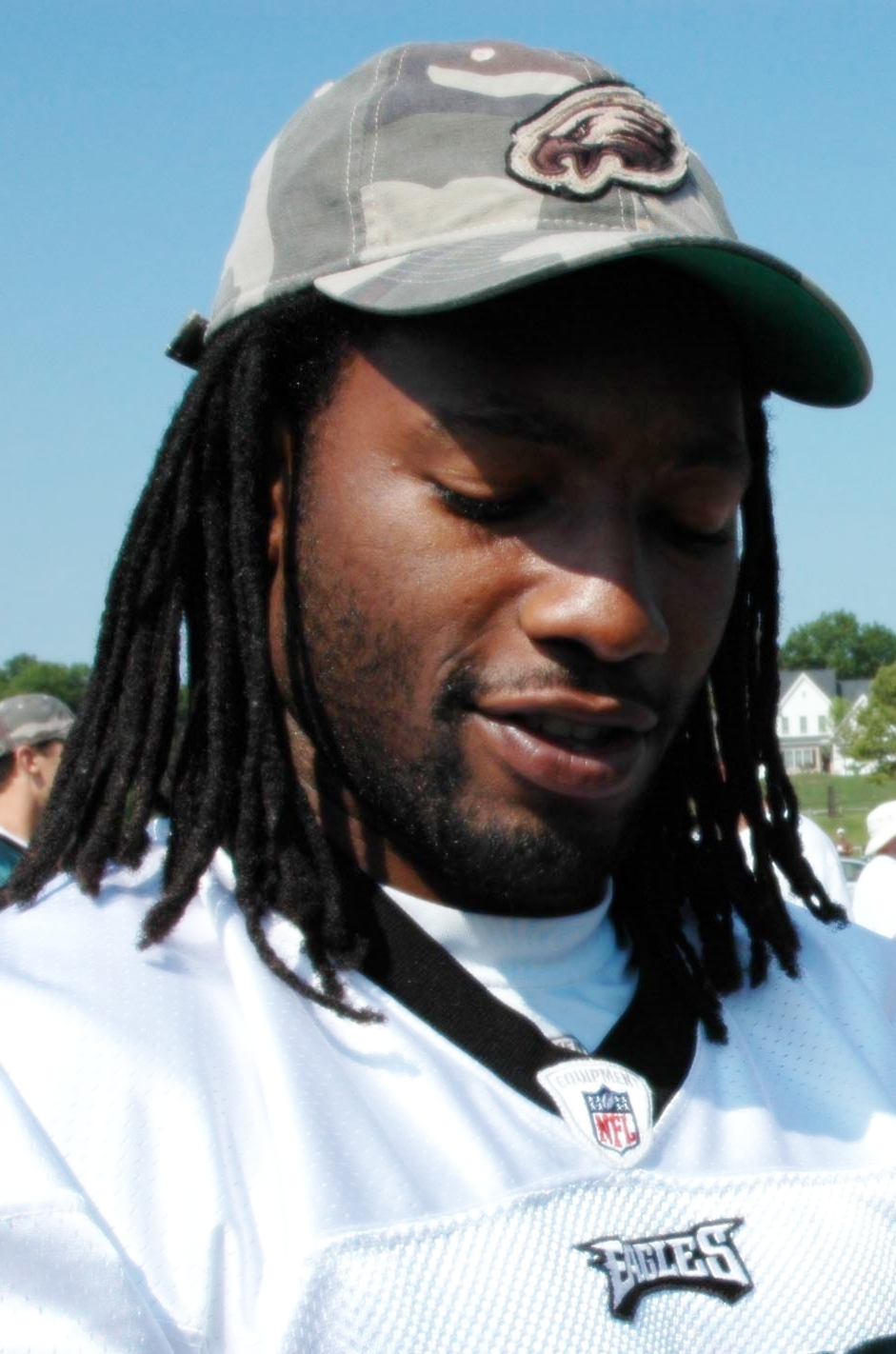
- Samuel with the Philadelphia Eagles in 2008

No. 22
- Position: Cornerback

Personal information
- Born: January 6, 1981 (age 45); Accra, Ghana
- Listed height: 5 ft 11 in (1.80 m)
- Listed weight: 185 lb (84 kg)

Career information
- High school: Boyd H. Anderson (Lauderdale Lakes, Florida, U.S.)
- College: UCF (1999–2002)
- NFL draft: 2003: 4th round, 120th overall pick

Career history
- New England Patriots (2003–2007); Philadelphia Eagles (2008–2011); Atlanta Falcons (2012–2013)

Awards and highlights
- 2× Super Bowl champion (XXXVIII, XXXIX); First-team All-Pro (2007); Second-team All-Pro (2009); 4× Pro Bowl (2007–2010); 2× NFL interceptions leader (2006, 2009); New England Patriots All-2000s Team; New England Patriots All-Dynasty Team; First-team All-MAC (2002); First-team All-Independent (2001); NFL record: Most interception returns for touchdown in playoffs (4)

Career NFL statistics
- Total tackles: 439
- Forced fumbles: 7
- Fumble recoveries: 3
- Pass deflections: 164
- Interceptions: 51
- Defensive touchdowns: 6
- Stats at Pro Football Reference

Asante Tyrell Samuel Sr. (born January 6, 1981) is an American former professional football player who was a cornerback in the National Football League (NFL). He was born in Accra, Ghana and raised in Fort Lauderdale, Florida. He played college football for the UCF Knights and was selected by the New England Patriots in the fourth round of the 2003 NFL draft. Samuel also played for the Philadelphia Eagles and Atlanta Falcons. He led the NFL twice in interceptions, in 2006 and 2009. He is the father of Asante Samuel Jr., a cornerback who plays for the Pittsburgh Steelers.

== Early life ==
Samuel was born in Accra, Ghana, and raised in Fort Lauderdale, Florida, where he attended Boyd H. Anderson High School in Lauderdale Lakes, Florida. As a junior quarterback, he threw for 1,800 yards and rushed for 500 yards. As a senior, Samuel concentrated on defense, and earned All-State honors, and finished his senior year with 4 interceptions and 75 tackles. Samuel also managed kick and punt return duties. Ten minutes before kickoff of Samuel's final high school game, he replaced his team's injured starting quarterback. He threw two touchdown passes, intercepted two more, rushed for 80 yards, and even worked on special teams returning kicks and punts. Samuel decreased his 40-yard dash time from 4.5 seconds during his sophomore year of high school to 4.49 seconds entering the NFL.

== College career ==
Samuel attended the University of Central Florida, majored in business administration, and played for the UCF Knights football team. He finished his college career with 127 tackles (102 solo, 25 assisted), 8 interceptions, and a school-record 38 passes deflected (the previous record was 34 deflections). Samuel also returned 63 punts for 673 yards, for an average of 10.7 yards per return.

== Professional career ==
Pre-draft measurables
Height	Weight	Arm length	Hand span	40-yard dash	10-yard split	20-yard split	20-yard shuttle	Three-cone drill	Vertical jump	Broad jump	Bench press	Wonderlic
5 ft 10 7/8 in (1.80 m)	185 lb (84 kg)	29 1/2 in (0.75 m)	9 3/4 in (0.25 m)	4.49 s	1.55 s	2.62 s	4.10 s	6.90 s	38.5 in (0.98 m)	10 ft 0 in (3.05 m)	16 reps	29
All values from NFL Combine

=== New England Patriots ===
==== 2003 ====
The New England Patriots selected Samuel in the fourth round (120th overall) of the 2003 NFL draft. The Patriots orchestrated a trade with the Denver Broncos to ensure the acquisition of Samuel by agreeing to trade their fourth-(128th overall) and fifth-round (157th overall) picks in the 2003 NFL draft in return for the 2003 fourth-round pick (120th overall) from the Broncos. He was the 16th cornerback selected and the last of two cornerbacks drafted by the Patriots in 2003, following second-round pick (39th overall) Eugene Wilson .

On June 10, 2003, the Patriots signed Samuel to a four–year, $1.68 million rookie contract that included a signing bonus of $312,500.

Throughout training camp, he competed Tyrone Poole to earn the role as the No. 2 starting cornerback following the departure of Otis Smith. Head coach Bill Belichick named him a backup and listed him as the No. 3 cornerback on the depth chart to begin the season, behind starters Tyrone Poole and Ty Law.

On September 7, 2003, Samuel made his professional regular season debut in the New England Patriots' season-opener at the Buffalo Bills and made one tackle and one pass deflection as they lost 0–31. On September 21, 2003, Samuel recorded two solo tackles, set a season-high with two pass deflections, and returned his first career interception for a touchdown during a 23–16 win against the New York Jets. He intercepted a pass attempt by Vinny Testaverde thrown to wide receiver Wayne Chrebet and returned it 55–yards to score his first career touchdown. In Week 7, Samuel earned his first career start in place of Ty Law, who was inactive due to an ankle injury. He recorded one solo tackle and broke up one pass during a 19–13 overtime victory at the Miami Dolphins. On November 3, 2003, Samuel made one solo tackle, one pass deflection, and sealed the Patriots' 30–26 victory at the Denver Broncos by intercepting a pass by Danny Kanell to wide receiver Ashley Lelie with 19 seconds remaining in the game. In Week 13, he set a season-high with eight combined tackles (seven solo) during a 38–34 loss at the Indianapolis Colts. He appeared in all 16 games throughout his rookie season with one start and finished with a total of 34 combined tackles (29 solo), made five pass deflections, two interceptions, and one touchdown.

The New England Patriots finished the 2003 NFL season with a 14–2 record, earning a first-round bye. On January 10, 2004, Samuel appeared in his first career playoff game, but was limited to two solo tackles during a 17–14 win against the Tennessee Titans in the Divisional Round. On February 1, 2004, Samuel appeared in Super Bowl XXXVIII, as the Patriots defeated the Carolina Panthers 32–29, earning Samuel his first Super Bowl ring.

==== 2004 ====
Throughout training camp, Samuel competed against Tyrone Poole to be the No. 2 starting cornerback under defensive coordinator Romeo Crennel. Head coach Bill Belichick named him the primary backup and listed him as the third cornerback on the depth chart to begin the season, behind returning starters Ty Law and Tyrone Poole.

In Week 6, starting cornerback Tyrone Poole injured his knee during a 30–20 victory against the Seattle Seahawks. Samuel was subsequently named as his replacement as the No. 2 starting cornerback entering Week 7. On October 31, 2004, the Patriots' No. 1 starting cornerback, Ty Law, exited in the first quarter of a 20–34 loss at the Pittsburgh Steelers after suffering a fracture to his foot. Samuel would start alongside rookie Randall Gay for the rest of the season, as Ty Law remained inactive for the last eight games (Weeks 10–17). On November 7, 2004, Samuel recorded one solo tackle before exiting in the first quarter of a 40–22 victory at the St. Louis Rams due to an injury to his arm. He subsequently remained inactive for the Patriots' 29–6 win against the Buffalo Bills in Week 10. He was sidelined for two games (Weeks 12–13) due to a shoulder injury, but returned before fully recovering. In Week 14, Samuel set a season-high with three pass deflections and had a pick-six after intercepting a pass by Carson Palmer to wide receiver T. J. Houshmandzadeh and returning it 34–yards for a touchdown during a 28–35 victory against the Cincinnati Bengals. The following week, he set a season-high with six combined tackles (five solo) and had one pass deflection during a 28–29 loss at the Miami Dolphins in Week 15. On December 17, 2004, the Patriots officially placed Poole on injured reserve due to his knee injury that required surgery and rendered him inactive. He finished the season with a total of 39 combined tackles (37 solo), made 12 pass deflections, three forced fumbles, one interception, and one touchdown in 13 games and eight starts.

The New England Patriots finished the 2004 NFL season first in the AFC East with a 14–2 record. On January 16, 2005, Samuel earned a start in a playoff game for the first time in his career during a 20–3 victory against the Indianapolis Colts in the AFC Divisional Round. On February 6, 2005, Samuel started in Super Bowl XXXIX and recorded four combined tackles (three solo) and led his team with four pass deflections as the Patriots defeated the Philadelphia Eagles 24–21.

==== 2005 ====
The New England Patriots promoted Eric Mangini to defensive coordinator after Romeo Crennel accepted the head coach position with the Cleveland Browns. He entered training camp as a candidate to become the No. 1 starting cornerback following the departure of Ty Law. He competed for the role against Tyrone Poole, Randall Gay, Duane Starks, and Chad Scott. He began the season as the No. 1 starting cornerback, alongside Tyrone Poole. In Week 1, Tyrone Poole injured his ankle and was replaced by Randall Gay as he remained inactive for the rest of the season.

In Week 8, he set a season-high with seven solo tackles, made two pass deflections, and intercepted a pass by Kelly Holcomb to wide receiver Eric Moulds as the Patriots defeated the Buffalo Bills 21–16. The following week, Samuels set a season-high with eight combined tackles (six solo) and made two pass deflections during a 21–40 loss to the Indianapolis Colts in Week 9. He was inactive as the Patriots lost 26–28 against the Miami Dolphins in Week 17. He finished with a title of 54 combined tackles (44 solo), 13 pass deflections, and three interceptions in 15 games and 15 starts.

The New England Patriots finished second in the AFC East with a 10–6 record to clinch a Wildcard berth. On January 7, 2006, Samuels made four solo tackles, three pass deflections, and returned an interception thrown by Byron Leftwich to wide receiver Reggie Williams for a 73–yard touchdown during a 28–3 victory against the Jacksonville Jaguars in the AFC Wild-Card Game. On January 14, 2006, Samuels started in the AFC Divisional Round and recorded three solo tackles, made three pass deflections, and intercepted a pass by Jake Plummer to wide receiver Ashley Lelie as the Patriots lost 13–27 at the Denver Broncos.

==== 2006 ====
The New England Patriots promoted linebackers coach Dean Pees to defensive coordinator following the departure of Eric Mangini, who became the head coach of the New York Jets. Samuel entered training camp slated as the de facto No. 1 starting cornerback following the departures of Tyrone Poole and Duane Starks. Head coach Bill Belichick named Samuel and Ellis Hobbs the starting cornerbacks to begin the season.

On October 8, 2006, Samuel made six solo tackles, two pass deflections, and had two interceptions on passes thrown by Joey Harrington as the Patriots defeated the Miami Dolphins 20–10. This was his first career performance with multiple interceptions. He was sidelined for the Patriots' 35–0 victory at the Green Bay Packers in Week 11 due to a knee injury. In Week 12, he set a season-high with eight solo tackles, made three pass deflections, and set a career-high with three interceptions off passes thrown by Rex Grossman during a 17–13 victory against the Chicago Bears. His three interceptions tied the Patriots' single game interception record. The following week, he recorded one solo tackle, set a season-high with four pass deflections, and intercepted a pass by Jon Kitna to wide receiver Corey Bradford as the Patriots defeated the Detroit Lions 28–21. On December 31, 2006, Samuel made two solo tackles, tied his season-high of four pass deflections, and picked off two pass attempts by Vince Young during a 40–23 victory at the Tennessee Titans. He had one of the best seasons in his career in 2006, setting career-highs with 64 combined tackles (59 solo), 24 pass deflections, and 10 interceptions, while appearing in 15 games with 15 starts. His 10 interceptions tied Broncos' cornerback Champ Bailey for the most interceptions in 2006. His 10 interceptions is the second most in the Patriots' franchise history for a single season, only behind Ron Hall, who had 11 interceptions (1964).

The New England Patriots finished atop the AFC East with a 12–4 record during the 2006 NFL season, to clinch a playoff berth. On January 7, 2007, Samuel recorded three solo tackles, made three pass deflections, and had a pick-six after picking off a pass by Chad Pennington to wide receiver Justin McCareins and returned it 36–yards for a touchdown during a 37–16 win against the New York Jets in the AFC Wild-Card Game. On January 21, 2007, Samuel started in the AFC Championship Game and made two solo tackles, three pass deflections, and returned an interception thrown by Peyton Manning to wide receiver Marvin Harrison and returned it 39–yards for a touchdown as the Patriots lost 34–38 at the Indianapolis Colts. The Colts eliminated the Patriots from the playoffs and advanced to the Super Bowl as they defeated the Chicago Bears 29–17 to win Super Bowl XLI.

==== 2007 ====
On February 16, 2007, the New England Patriots opted to assign the franchise tag on Samuel. On August 27, 2007, Samuel signed his franchise tag, for one–year, $7.79 million tender after he held out for the entire training camp and the majority of the preseason, as he was seeking a long-term contract offer. It was reported by The Boston Globe, that his agreement with the Patriots included a contract stipulation that stated the Patriots would not be able to place the franchise tag on Samuel for the second consecutive season if he played 60% of the snaps on defense at the conclusion of the 2007 NFL season.

Due to his absence during training camp, the Patriots held a competition between Randall Gay and Chad Scott to name his replacement. Head coach Bill Belichick named Randall Gay and Ellis Hobbs as the starting cornerbacks to begin the season. On September 8, 2007, the Patriots officially activated Samuel and added him to their active roster. He began the season as the primary backup cornerback.

On October 1, 2007, Samuel set a season-high with four solo tackles, made two pass deflections, and intercepted a pass thrown by Carson Palmer to wide receiver Chad Ochocinco during a 34–13 victory at the Cincinnati Bengals. The following week, he recorded two solo tackles, broke up two pass attempts, and intercepted a pass by Derek Anderson to wide receiver Joe Jurevicius as the Patriots defeated the Cleveland Browns 34–17 in Week 5. This marked his third consecutive game with an interception. In Week 12, Samuel made three solo tackles, three pass deflections, set a season-high with two interceptions, and returned one for a touchdown during a 31–28 win against the Philadelphia Eagles. On the opening drive, Samuel had a pick-six, intercepting a pass by A. J. Feeley to running back Brian Westbrook and returned it 40–yards for a touchdown. He helped secure their victory by intercepting a pass by A. J. Feeley to wide receiver Kevin Curtis with 3:58 remaining in the fourth quarter. In Week 14, he set a season-high with five combined tackles (three solo) and had one pass deflection during a 34–13 win against the Pittsburgh Steelers. He finished the season with a total of 46 combined tackles (43 solo), 18 pass deflections, six interceptions, and one touchdown in 16 games and 14 starts. He was voted to the Pro Bowl for the first time in his career.

The New England Patriots were undefeated in 2007, finishing with a record of 16–0. On January 20, 2008, Samuel started in the AFC Championship Game and recorded three solo tackles, made two pass deflections, and intercepted a pass by Philip Rivers to wide receiver Chris Chambers during a 21–12 victory against the San Diego Chargers. On February 3, 2008, Samuel started in Super Bowl XLII and recorded two combined tackles (one solo) and made one pass deflection. Late in the fourth quarter, with 1:20 remaining and the Patriots leading 14–10, Samuel dropped a crucial interception on a pass attempt thrown by Eli Manning to wide receiver David Tyree that would have sealed the Patriots victory. On the following play, Manning completed a 32-yard pass to Tyree, which became famously known as the Helmet Catch. The New York Giants would have a last-minute comeback victory, defeating the New England Patriots 17–14 to win Super Bowl XLII and ended the Patriots 18 game undefeated streak.

=== Philadelphia Eagles ===
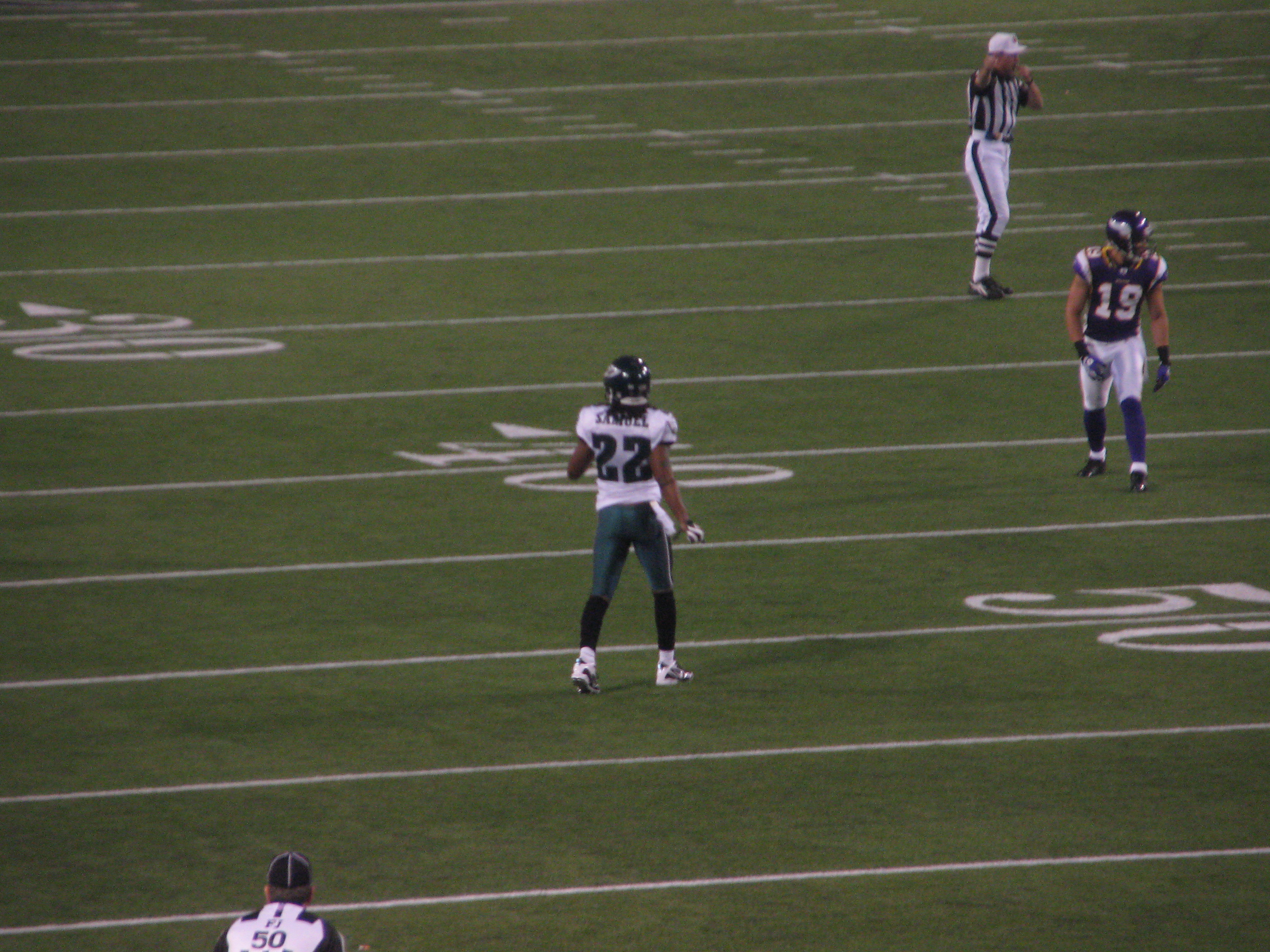
Samuel in the 2009 NFC Wild Card Game

==== 2008 ====
On February 29, 2008, within minutes of the official start of free agency, it was reported that Samuel would be meeting with the Philadelphia Eagles, as he was considered as one of the sought-after free agents. Later that day, the Philadelphia Eagles signed Samuel to a six–year, $59.47 million contract as an unrestricted free agent, that includes $6.60 million guaranteed and an initial signing bonus of $6.00 million. Upon being signed, Samuel was quoted as saying, “I just want to be able to win and get back to the Super Bowl.” He entered training camp slated as the de facto No. 1 starting cornerback under defensive coordinator Jim Johnson. Head coach Andy Reid named him a starting cornerback to begin the season and started him alongside Sheldon Brown and nickelback Lito Sheppard.

On September 15, 2007, Samuel made two solo tackles, one pass deflection, and had his first interception as a member of the Eagles during a 37–41 loss at the Dallas Cowboys. His first interception of the season was on a pass attempt thrown by Tony Romo to wide receiver Miles Austin. The following week, he set a season-high with six combined tackles (four solo), made two pass deflections, and intercepted a pass by Ben Roethlisberger to wide receiver Nate Washington in Week 3. He was inactive as the Eagles defeated the Arizona Cardinals 48–20 in Week 13 due to an injury to his neck that was described as a stinger. On December 15, 2008, Samuel made one solo tackle, one pass deflection, and returned an interception thrown by Ken Dorsey to wide receiver Donte Stallworth for a 50–yard touchdown during a 30–10 victory against the Cleveland Browns. He finished the season with a total of 36 combined tackles (32 solo), tied his career-high with 24 pass deflections, made four interceptions, and scored one touchdown in 15 games and 15 starts.

The Philadelphia Eagles finished the 2008 NFL season second in the NFC East with a 9–6–1 record, earning a Wildcard berth. On January 4, 2009, Samuel made one solo tackle, a pass deflection, and returned an interception on a pass by Tarvaris Jackson thrown to wide receiver Sidney Rice 44–yards for a touchdown during a 26–14 victory at the Minnesota Vikings in the NFC Wild-Card Game. He set an NFL record with his fourth interception returned for a touchdown in the postseason. The following week, Samuel recorded four solo tackles, made one pass deflection, and picked off a pass by Eli Manning thrown to wide receiver Domenik Hixon as the Eagles won the NFC Divisional Round 23–11 at the New York Giants. On January 18, 2009, Samuel started in the NFC Championship Game and recorded three solo tackles as the Eagles lost 25–32 at the Arizona Cardinals.

==== 2009 ====
On May 18, 2009, the Philadelphia Eagles promoted defensive backs coach Sean McDermott to defensive coordinator following the departure of Jim Johnson due to a medical leave. McDermott chose to retain Samuel and Sheldon Brown as the starting cornerbacks to begin the season.

On September 13, 2009, Samuel started in the Eagles' season-opener at the Carolina Panthers and made three solo tackles, set a season-high with two pass deflections, and intercepted a pass by Jake Delhomme to wide receiver Steve Smith Sr. as they won 38–10. In Week 5, he made four solo tackles, two pass deflections, and set a season-high with two interceptions on passes thrown by Josh Johnson during a 33–14 win against the Tampa Bay Buccaneers. In Week 12, he had two pass deflections and tied his season-high of two interceptions on pass attempts by Jason Campbell during a 27–24 win against the Washington Redskins. On December 20, 2009, Samuel made four solo tackles, a pass deflection, a fumble recovery, and had his eighth interception of the on a pass by Alex Smith to tight end Vernon Davis during a 27–13 win against the San Francisco 49ers. The following week, he set a season-high with five solo tackles, made a pass deflection, and had his ninth interception of the season on a pass attempt by Kyle Orton to tight end Tony Scheffler as the Eagles defeated the Denver Broncos 30–27 in Week 16. He started all 16 games for the first time in his career and finished with a total of 40 combined tackles (39 solo), 16 pass deflections, nine interceptions, one forced fumble, and a fumble recovery. With nine interceptions in 2009, Samuel tied for the most interceptions that season, along with Jairus Byrd, Charles Woodson, and Darren Sharper. His nine interceptions tied for second in franchise history for most interceptions in a single season, with Don Burroughs (1960) and Ed "Bibbles" Bawel (1955). He was selected to the 2010 Pro Bowl. He was ranked 54th by his fellow players on the NFL Top 100 Players of 2011.

==== 2010 ====
He returned to training camp as the No. 1 starting cornerback. Samuel and Ellis Hobbs began the season as the starting cornerbacks for the second consecutive season. In Week 4, Samuel recorded two solo tackles, before exiting in the fourth quarter of a 12–17 loss to the Washington Redskins after he suffered a concussion while making a tackle on tight end Mike Sellers. He subsequently remained inactive for the Eagles' 27–24 victory at the San Francisco 49ers in Week 5 due to his concussion. On October 17, 2010, he made four combined tackles (three solo), set a season-high with three pass deflections, and intercepted a pass by Matt Ryan to tight end Tony Gonzalez as the Eagles defeated the Atlanta Falcons 31–17. In Week 7, he made three combined tackles (two solo), one pass deflection, and intercepted a pass by Kerry Collins to wide receiver Kenny Britt during a 19–37 loss at the Tennessee Titans. On November 7, 2010, he made two pass deflections and set a season-high with two interceptions during a 26–24 win against the Indianapolis Colts. He sealed the Eagles' victory with 18 seconds remaining, by intercepting a pass attempt by Peyton Manning to wide receiver Blair White. In Week 11, Samuel recorded two solo tackles, made two pass deflections, and tied his season-high of two interceptions on pass attempts by Eli Manning during a 27–17 win against the New York Giants. During the game, Samuel injured his knee while recovering a fumble and subsequently remained inactive for the next three games (Weeks 12–14). He was sidelined as the Eagles lost 13–14 to the Dallas Cowboys in Week 17 after reinjuring his knee. He finished the 2010 NFL season with a total of 26 combined tackles (22 solo), 14 pass deflections, nine interceptions, and one forced fumble in 11 games and 10 starts.

==== 2011 ====
On February 2, 2011, the Philadelphia Eagles unexpectedly promoted offensive lineman coach Juan Castillo to defensive coordinator after Sean McDermott was fired following the 2010 NFL season. Castillo retained Samuel as the No. 1 starting cornerback to begin training camp. On July 28, 2011, the Eagles acquired Dominique Rodgers-Cromartie in a trade with the Arizona Cardinals and also signed top unrestricted free agent Nnamdi Asomugha the following day. Head coach Andy Reid named Samuel and Nnamdi Asomugha the starting cornerbacks to begin the season along with nickelback Dominique Rodgers-Cromartie.

On September 11, 2011, Samuel started in the Eagles' season-opener at the St. Louis Rams and set a season-high with five solo tackles as they won 31–13. The following week, he recorded two solo tackles, set a season-high with two pass deflections, and intercepted a pass by Matt Ryan to wide receiver Julio Jones during a 31–35 loss at the Atlanta Falcons in Week 2. On October 28, 2011, following practice, Samuel openly criticized the Eagles' front office during an interview and expressed his frustration about repeated trade rumors that immediately began after the Eagles acquired Nnamdi Asomugha and Dominique Rodgers-Cromartie during training camp.

"Couple people upstairs might not want me, but who cares. They've probably never played football. It's a business and they run it like a business and they're going to do what they need to do. They're playing with a lot of money, playing fantasy football, doing their thing." (When asked if he was referring to GM Howie Roseman and President Joe Banner) "Howie and Joe? I don't know, do they fit the comment I made? There ya go. You think they're upstairs playing fantasy football with the owner's money? That sucks, doesn’t it?. Each trade deadline for your name to be flying around and you’re supposed to be the leader of this team."

— Asante Samuel

On November 20, 2011, Samuel made four combined tackles (three solo), two pass deflections, and had a pick-six after intercepting a pass attempt by John Skelton to wide receiver Larry Fitzgerald and returning it for a 20–yard touchdown as the Eagles lost 17–21 against the Arizona Cardinals. In Week 15, he made two combined tackles (one solo), one pass deflection, and had his last interception as a member of the Eagles on a pass by Mark Sanchez to wide receiver Santonio Holmes as the Eagles defeated the New York Jets 45–19. Due to a hamstring injury, Samuel was inactive for the last two games of the season (Weeks 16–17). He finished his last season with the Philadelphia Eagles with a total of 34 combined tackles (30 solo), 10 pass deflections, three interceptions, one touchdown, a forced fumble, and one fumble recovery in 14 games and 14 starts.

=== Atlanta Falcons ===
==== 2012 ====
On April 25, 2012, the Atlanta Falcons acquired Samuel in a trade with the Philadelphia Eagles and in return received a seventh-round pick (229th overall) in 2012 NFL draft. The Falcons only agreed to the trade after Samuel agreed to restructure his contract that still has two–years, $21.30 million remaining. The Atlanta Falcons signed Samuel to a three–year, $14.70 million contract extension that included $2.25 million guaranteed.

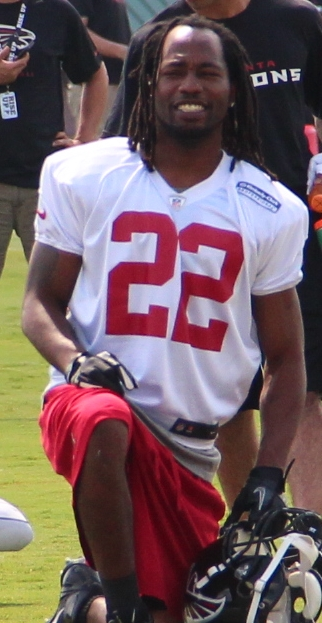
Samuel at Falcons training camp in 2013

The Falcons entered trade talks with the Eagles to possibly acquire Samuel after Brent Grimes publicly refused to sign his franchise tag and would hold out until he received a long-term deal. Throughout training camp, he competed to earn a role as a starting cornerback against Dunta Robinson and Brent Grimes under defensive coordinator Mike Nolan. Head coach Mike Smith named Samuel a backup and listed him as the No. 3 cornerback on the depth chart to begin the season, behind starters Brent Grimes and Dunta Robinson.

In Week 2, he set a season-high with seven combined tackles (six solo) during a 27–21 victory against the Denver Broncos. He entered the game as a replacement for Brent Grimes who exited due to an injury. On September 11, 2012, the Falcons officially placed Brent Grimes on injured reserve due to a torn Achilles tendon. Samuel was therefore promoted to the No. 2 starting cornerback for the rest of the season. On October 14, 2012, Samuel made four solo tackles, one pass deflection, and led the Falcons to a 23–20 comeback victory against the Oakland Raiders with a pick-six late in the fourth quarter. Samuel intercepted a pass attempt thrown by Carson Palmer to wide receiver Denarius Moore and returned it 79–yards for a touchdown with 3:54 remaining. In Week 10, he recorded two solo tackles, set a season-high with three pass deflections, and picked off a pass attempt by Drew Brees to wide receiver Marques Colston during a 27–31 loss at the New Orleans Saints. On November 29, 2012, Samuel exited early in the first quarter of a 23–13 win against the Saints after re-injuring his shoulder that he originally injured while tackling Larry Fitzgerald in Week 11 against the Arizona Cardinals. In Week 15, Samuel recorded one tackle, made two pass deflections, and intercepted the first pass attempt by Eli Manning that was thrown to wide receiver Hakeem Nicks as the Falcons routed the New York Giants 34–0. On December 30, 2012, Samuel made two solo tackles, two pass deflections, and had his third consecutive game with an interception after picking off a pass by Josh Freeman to wide receiver Tiquan Underwood during a 17–22 loss against the Tampa Bay Buccaneers. He finished the 2012 NFL season with 37 combined tackles (34 solo), 15 pass deflections, five interceptions, and a single touchdown in 15 games and 15 starts.

==== 2013 ====
Following the departures of Dunta Robinson and Brent Grimes, the Falcons selected Desmond Trufant in the first-round (22nd overall) and Robert Alford in the second-round (60th overall) of the 2013 NFL draft. Throughout training camp, Samuel competed against Desmond Trufant, Robert McClain, and Robert Alford to earn a starting role at cornerback. Head coach Mike Smith named Samuel the No. 1 starting cornerback to begin the season, alongside Desmond Trufant.

Samuel was inactive in Week 1, as the Falcons lost 17–23 at the New Orleans Saints due to an injury to his thigh. He was inactive again as the Falcons lost 23–30 against the New England Patriots in Week 4, due to his lingering thigh injury. On October 27, 2013, Samuel recorded three solo tackles, broke up a pass, and had his last career interception after picking off a pass by Carson Palmer to wide receiver Andre Roberts during a 13–27 loss at the Arizona Cardinals. The following week, he set a season-high with eight solo tackles and made one pass deflection during a 10–34 loss at the Carolina Panthers in Week 9. Entering Week 14, head coach Mike Smith chose to bench Samuel and listed him inactive as a healthy scratch, replacing him with Robert Alford at the Green Bay Packers. He was benched again and was listed as inactive as a healthy scratch for the last two games of the season in lieu of Robert Alford. Although Samuel began the season as the Falcons' No. 1 starting cornerback, by season's end he was listed as the No. 5 cornerback on the depth chart, behind Desmond Trufant, Robert Alford, Robert McClain, and Dominique Franks. He finished the season with 30 combined tackles (29 solo), four pass deflections, and one interception in 11 games and 10 starts.

On February 5, 2014, the Falcons released him.

== NFL career statistics ==
Legend
	Led the league
**Bold**	Career high
	NFL record

=== Regular season ===
Year	Team	Games		Tackles					Interceptions					Fumbles			
Year	Team	GP	GS	Cmb	Solo	Ast	Sck	TFL	Int	Yds	TD	Lng	PD	FF	FR	Yds	TD
2003	NE	**16**	1	34	29	5	0.0	0	2	55	**1**	55	9	0	0	0	0
2004	NE	13	8	39	37	2	0.0	2	1	34	**1**	34	12	**3**	0	0	0
2005	NE	15	15	54	44	**10**	0.0	1	3	15	0	15	16	0	0	0	0
2006	NE	15	15	**64**	**59**	5	0.0	**5**	**10**	**120**	0	33	**24**	1	0	0	0
2007	NE	**16**	14	46	43	3	0.0	0	6	89	**1**	42	18	0	0	0	0
2008	PHI	15	15	36	32	4	0.0	0	4	64	**1**	50	**24**	0	0	0	0
2009	PHI	**16**	**16**	40	39	1	0.0	1	9	117	0	37	16	1	**1**	0	0
2010	PHI	11	10	26	22	4	0.0	0	7	70	0	33	14	0	**1**	**1**	0
2011	PHI	14	14	34	30	4	0.0	0	3	53	**1**	20	10	1	**1**	0	0
2012	ATL	15	15	36	34	2	0.0	0	5	110	**1**	**79**	17	0	0	0	0
2013	ATL	11	10	30	29	1	0.0	0	1	1	0	1	4	1	0	0	0
Career		157	133	439	398	41	0.0	9	51	728	6	79	164	7	3	1	0

=== Playoffs ===
Year	Team	Games		Tackles					Interceptions					Fumbles			
Year	Team	GP	GS	Cmb	Solo	Ast	Sck	TFL	Int	Yds	TD	Lng	PD	FF	FR	Yds	TD
2003	NE	**3**	0	5	5	0	0.0	0	0	0	0	0	1	0	0	0	0
2004	NE	**3**	**3**	7	6	1	0.0	0	0	0	0	0	4	0	0	0	0
2005	NE	2	2	7	7	0	0.0	0	**2**	73	1	**73**	6	0	0	0	0
2006	NE	**3**	**3**	7	7	0	0.0	0	**2**	**75**	**2**	39	**8**	0	0	0	0
2007	NE	**3**	**3**	**9**	7	**2**	0.0	0	1	10	0	10	3	0	0	0	0
2008	PHI	**3**	2	8	8	0	0.0	0	**2**	69	1	44	2	0	0	0	0
2009	PHI	1	1	0	0	0	0.0	0	0	0	0	0	1	0	0	0	0
2010	PHI	1	1	1	1	0	0.0	0	0	0	0	0	1	0	0	0	0
2012	ATL	2	2	**9**	**9**	0	0.0	0	0	0	0	0	2	0	0	0	0
Career		21	17	53	50	3	0.0	0	7	227	4	73	28	0	0	0	0

== Personal life ==
Samuel has a tattoo on his left arm that says "Get Rich To This." It was widely reported during Samuel's post-2006 season contract situation that the tattoo said "Get Paid". Samuel's tattoo is the name of a Goodie Mob song that Samuel liked in college.

Samuel married his wife in 2012. Samuel's son, Asante Jr., was born in 1999 and played cornerback at Florida State University. He was drafted by the Los Angeles Chargers in the 2021 NFL draft.
