= Bryan Smith (American football) =

American football player (born 1983)

No. 53
- Position: Linebacker

Personal information
- Born: November 29, 1983 (age 42); Newton, Texas, U.S.
- Listed height: 6 ft 2 in (1.88 m)
- Listed weight: 250 lb (113 kg)

Career information
- High school: Newton
- College: McNeese State
- NFL draft: 2008: 3rd round, 80th overall pick

Career history
- Philadelphia Eagles (2008); St. Louis Rams (2009)*; Jacksonville Jaguars (2009–2010)
- * Offseason or practice squad member only

Awards and highlights
- 2× SLC Defensive P.O.Y. (2006–2007); 2× Little All-American (2006–2007)

Career NFL statistics
- Total tackles: 6
- Stats at Pro Football Reference

Bryan Smith (born November 29, 1983) is an American former professional football player who was a linebacker in the National Football League (NFL). He played college football for the McNeese Cowboys before being selected by the Philadelphia Eagles in the third round of the 2008 NFL draft.

Smith was also a member of the St. Louis Rams and Jacksonville Jaguars.

== Early life ==
Smith was an All-district performer in both football and basketball and one of the top football players coming out of SE Texas in 2002. He earned four letters in both football and basketball and a high jumper in track and field and was third place in state high jump meet.

== College career ==
As a senior in 2007, Smith recorded 10.5 sacks and 22.5 tackles for a loss en route to his second consecutive little All-America nomination. In 2006, he was named SLC Defensive Player of the Year and was finalist for national Buck Buchanan award. He was also All-Louisiana and named to several First-team small college All-America squads. He had 13.5 sacks and 84 tackles, led SLC in tackles for a loss with 23 and recovered four fumbles and forced three. In 2005, he led the team with 11 tackles for loss, 11 quarterback hurries, and seven sacks. Smith had 43 total tackles in the season.

== Professional career ==
Pre-draft measurables
Height	Weight	40-yard dash	10-yard split	20-yard split	20-yard shuttle	Three-cone drill	Vertical jump	Broad jump	Bench press	Wonderlic
6 ft 3 in (1.91 m)	231 lb (105 kg)	4.75 s	1.60 s	2.71 s	4.40 s	7.22 s	32.5 in (0.83 m)	10 ft 0 in (3.05 m)	17 reps	12
All values from NFL Combine.

Smith was selected by the Philadelphia Eagles in the third round of the 2008 NFL draft with the 80th overall pick. He signed a 4-year contract with the team on July 1, 2008. He was waived on September 5, 2009.

The St. Louis Rams signed Smith to their practice squad on September 7, 2009.

Smith was signed off the St. Louis Rams' practice squad by the Jacksonville Jaguars on September 28, 2009. He was waived and subsequently placed on the injured reserve list on May 10, 2010.
