= Kyle Eckel =

American football player (born 1981)

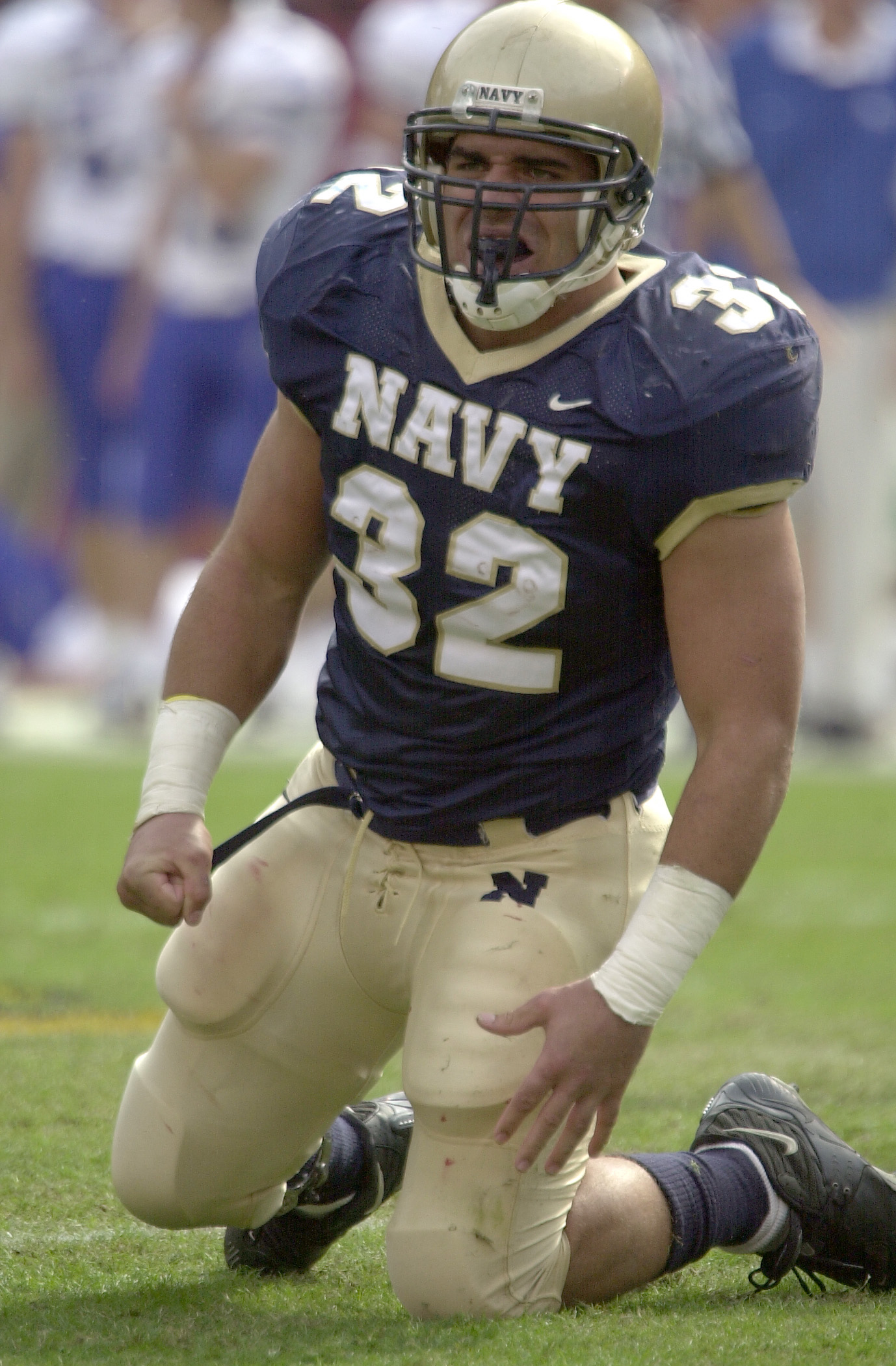
- Eckel celebrates a rushing attempt against Air Force in 2003

No. 32, 36, 38
- Position: Fullback

Personal information
- Born: December 30, 1981 (age 44); Philadelphia, Pennsylvania, U.S.
- Listed height: 5 ft 11 in (1.80 m)
- Listed weight: 237 lb (108 kg)

Career information
- College: Navy
- NFL draft: 2005: undrafted

Career history
- New England Patriots (2005)*; Miami Dolphins (2005–2007); New England Patriots (2007–2008); Philadelphia Eagles (2008); New Orleans Saints (2009); Denver Broncos (2010)
- * Offseason or practice squad member only

Awards and highlights
- Super Bowl champion (XLIV)

Career NFL statistics
- Rushing yards: 175
- Rushing average: 3
- Rushing touchdowns: 2
- Receptions: 3
- Receiving yards: 20
- Stats at Pro Football Reference

Kyle Richard Eckel (born December 30, 1981) is an American former professional football player who was a fullback in the National Football League (NFL). He was signed by the New England Patriots as an undrafted free agent in 2005 and won Super Bowl XLIV with the New Orleans Saints, beating the Indianapolis Colts. He played college football for the Navy Midshipmen.

Eckel was also a member of the Miami Dolphins and Philadelphia Eagles.

== Early life and education ==
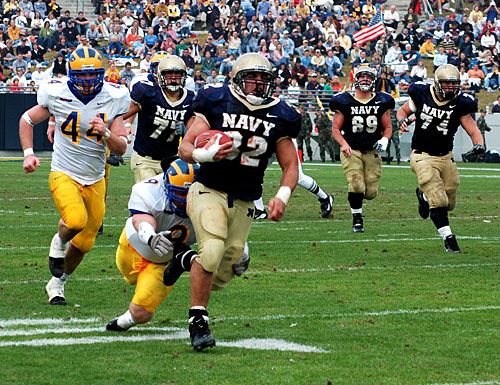
Eckel runs for a touchdown in Navy's homecoming game against Delaware in 2004

Eckel attended Holy Spirit School in South Philadelphia throughout elementary school, where he played baseball and basketball. He played football for St. Monica's School, as Holy Spirit didn't have a program. Changing parishes during eighth grade, Eckel was able to attend and graduate Holy Spirit while playing football for The Saint Denis Bulldogs of Havertown, Pennsylvania.

Eckel then attended Episcopal Academy in Merion Station, Pennsylvania (which later moved to Newtown Square, Pennsylvania) and was a letterman in football (three years), baseball (three years), and ice hockey (one year). In football, he was a two-time first-team All-Area and All-League selection. As a senior, while team captain, he earned first-team All-City and All-Area honors as a middle linebacker. Eckel amassed nearly 3,000 rushing yards and 40 touchdowns in his high school career.

While playing baseball for the Churchmen of Episcopal Academy, Eckel recorded a .460 batting average during his junior season, earning All-League, All-City and All-Area selections. He helped the Churchmen win their first league title in 50 years. As a senior, Eckel earned similar accolades, helped the Churchmen win another league title, was selected as a member of the Carpenter Cup All-Star team, and was selected to the All-League and All-Area teams. Eckel was most recently added to Ted Silary's "30 Year Inter-AC Football All-Star" team.

Eckel attended the Naval Academy and was ranked as a preseason All-American and the top NFL fullback prospect in the country by draftboardinsider.com prior to his senior season at Navy. He was also nominated as a preseason candidate for the 2004 Doak Walker Award. He rushed for 1,147 yards and 11 touchdowns as a senior, notably rushing 26 times for a career-high 179 yards and one touchdown against Army en route to being named the Philadelphia Sportswriters Most Valuable Player of the Army-Navy game for the second consecutive year.

Eckel had 13 career 100-yard rushing games, the fourth most in school history, and became the third player in school history to twice gain 1,000 yards rushing in a season. As a junior, Eckel carried the ball 236 times for 1,249 yards and 10 touchdowns. He was named to the All-Independent team by College Football News. As a sophomore, Eckel rushed for 510 yards and four touchdowns before having his season cut short by injury. He finished his career with 2,906 rushing yards, which ranks fourth all-time at Navy, and registered 25 career rushing touchdowns, fourth in school history.

== Navy Career ==
Eckel was administratively separated from the Navy a year after graduation from the Naval Academy under circumstances that have never been clear. Eckel, who had a practice deal with the Patriots while on active duty, was signed by the Miami Dolphins in 2006 but did not play that year. He was billed more than $96,000 for his Naval Academy tuition.

== Professional career ==
Pre-draft measurables
Height	Weight	40-yard dash	20-yard shuttle	Three-cone drill	Vertical jump	Broad jump	Bench press
5 ft 10 1/2 in (1.79 m)	244 lb (111 kg)	4.83 s	4.28 s	7.52 s	27.0 in (0.69 m)	8 ft 7 in (2.62 m)	27 reps
All values from Pro Day

=== New England Patriots (first stint) ===
Eckel was signed by the New England Patriots as an undrafted free agent on April 26, 2005. He was waived by the team on September 3.

=== Miami Dolphins ===
Eckel was claimed off waivers by the Miami Dolphins and subsequently placed on the Reserve/Military list on September 7, 2005, just days after being claimed by the Dolphins.

The Dolphins received a roster exemption for Eckel after his return to the team, allowing him to practice without counting against roster limits. He was not activated during the season, and was an exclusive rights free agent in the 2007 offseason. He was re-signed to a one-year contract on March 19, 2007, but released on September 1 during final cuts.

=== New England Patriots (second stint) ===
Eckel was signed to the Patriots' practice squad on September 3, 2007, at a salary of $125,000, significantly higher than that season's base salary for practice squad players ($79,900).

He was promoted to the active roster on October 1 against the Cincinnati Bengals. Eckel made his regular season debut in that Monday Night Football contest, playing on special teams for much of the game, recording one tackle and getting his first carry (for three yards) in the fourth quarter. He scored his first NFL touchdown in the final minute of the Patriots' Week 6 game against the Dallas Cowboys, and a second in their Week 10 rout of the Buffalo Bills. In the Week 9 game between the undefeated Patriots and undefeated Indianapolis Colts, Eckel led all players with three special teams tackles in a Patriots 24–20 win and received special teams player of the game honors.

The Patriots released Eckel on August 26, 2008, in the first round of preseason cuts. He was re-signed to the Patriots roster on September 15, 2008, the day after their Week 2 game. The Patriots again released Eckel on September 22.

=== Philadelphia Eagles ===
Eckel was signed by his hometown Philadelphia Eagles on October 21, 2008. He played much of the season as a special teams starter and short yardage running back. Eckel was named the most valuable special teams performer in a divisional round playoff victory against the New York Giants at the Meadowlands.

=== New Orleans Saints ===
On October 29, 2009, the New Orleans Saints announced that they had signed Eckel to their roster. Eckel was primarily a fullback and special teams player on the 2009 Saints that won Super Bowl XLIV against the Indianapolis Colts, 31–17.

=== Denver Broncos ===
Eckel was signed by the Denver Broncos on June 4, 2010. He was waived/injured on June 17, and subsequently placed on injured reserve on June 21.

== After football ==
In 2014, four years after leaving the NFL, Eckel was named the color analyst for the West Chester University football team, a school a few miles south of his native Philadelphia. He also became an assistant football coach for Malvern Prep. At the same time, Eckel was on the zoning board in Marlton, N.J.
