= Kevin Curtis =

American football player (born 1978)

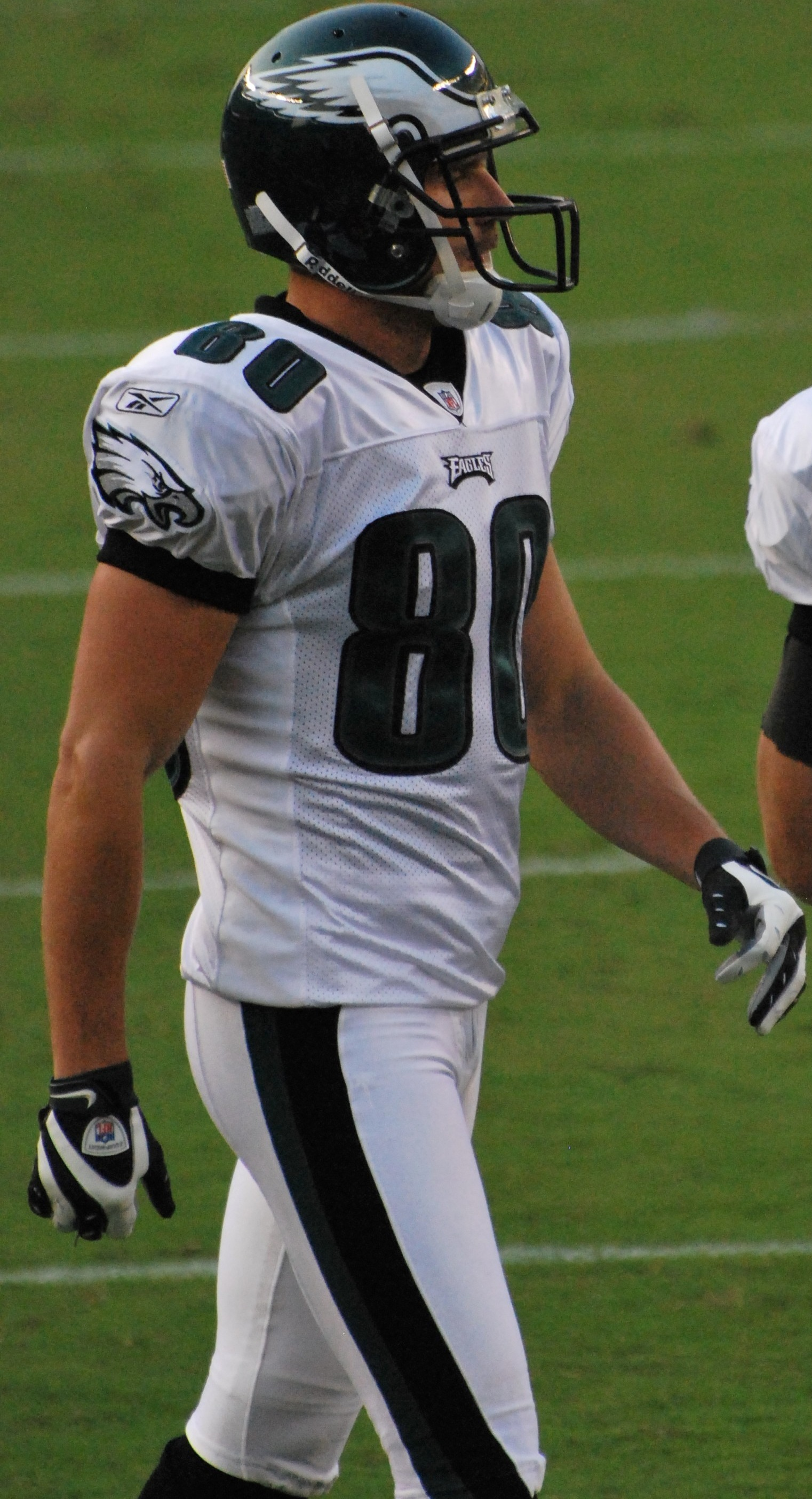
- Curtis with the Philadelphia Eagles in 2009

No. 83, 80, 17
- Position: Wide receiver

Personal information
- Born: July 17, 1978 (age 48); Murray, Utah, U.S.
- Listed height: 5 ft 11 in (1.80 m)
- Listed weight: 186 lb (84 kg)

Career information
- High school: Bingham (South Jordan, Utah)
- College: Snow College (1996–1997); Utah State (2001–2002)
- NFL draft: 2003: 3rd round, 74th overall pick

Career history
- St. Louis Rams (2003–2006); Philadelphia Eagles (2007–2009); Miami Dolphins (2010); Kansas City Chiefs (2010); Tennessee Titans (2011)

Awards and highlights
- Third-team All-American (2001)

Career NFL statistics
- Receptions: 253
- Receiving yards: 3,297
- Receiving average: 13
- Receiving touchdowns: 20
- Stats at Pro Football Reference

Kevin Devon Curtis (born July 17, 1978) is an American former professional football player who was a wide receiver in the National Football League (NFL). He played college football for the Utah State Aggies and was selected by the St. Louis Rams in the third round of the 2003 NFL draft. He also played for the Philadelphia Eagles, Miami Dolphins, Kansas City Chiefs, and Tennessee Titans.

== Early life ==
Curtis attended Bingham High School in South Jordan, Utah and was a letterman in football and basketball. In football, he was an All-Region honoree as both a wide receiver and as a defensive back.

== College career ==
Curtis began his collegiate career at NJCAA junior college powerhouse Snow College where he earned second-team All-American honors. He then transferred to Utah State.

Curtis started his Utah State career as a walk-on. As a junior, he led the nation in receptions, earning him third-team All-American honors. He also broke many Utah State single-season records along the way including pass receptions (100), receiving yards (1,531), most 10-reception games (6), most 100-yard receiving games (9), and most consecutive 100-yard receiving games (6). He was also named his team's Offensive MVP. His tremendous play as a junior earned him a scholarship for his senior year where he ranked seventh in the nation in receiving yards per game (114.36), and 12th in the country in receptions per game (6.73). Curtis also led the Aggies with 74 receptions (fifth-best season total in school history) for 1,258 yards (fifth-best in a single season) and scored 60 points to lead the team with an average of 117.4 all-purpose yards a game. In only two years at Utah State he ended his career leading in many statistical categories including career receptions (174), career pass reception yards per game (126.8), career pass receptions per game (7.9), and finished second in career receiving yards (2,789). He was teammates with Washington Redskins tight end Chris Cooley.

== Professional career ==
=== Pre-draft ===
Curtis ran a hand-timed 40-yard dash of 4.21 but a 4.35 at the NFL Combine; at the Combine, he scored a 48 out of a possible 50 points on the Wonderlic intelligence test. This is tied for the highest verified score among active players (Ryan Fitzpatrick and Benjamin Watson also scored 48). The only two players that scored higher on the Wonderlic Test were Pat McInally with a perfect 50 and Mike Mamula with a 49.

Pre-draft measurables
| Height | Weight | Arm length | Hand span | 40-yard dash | 10-yard split | 20-yard split | 20-yard shuttle | Three-cone drill | Vertical jump | Broad jump | Wonderlic |
|---|---|---|---|---|---|---|---|---|---|---|---|
| 5 ft 11 1/8 in (1.81 m) | 186 lb (84 kg) | 30 3/8 in (0.77 m) | 9 3/8 in (0.24 m) | 4.35 s | 1.53 s | 2.59 s | 3.99 s | 6.76 s | 36 in (0.91 m) | 10 ft 2 in (3.10 m) | 48 |
All values from the NFL Combine

=== St. Louis Rams ===
Curtis was selected by the St. Louis Rams in the third round (74th overall) of the 2003 NFL draft. Curtis was inactive for the first five games of 2003 after suffering a broken fibula in the final preseason game at Buffalo. In 2004, Curtis played in all but one game, totaling 32 catches for 421 yards and 2 touchdowns. The Rams would finish just 8-8 that year, barely making the playoffs.

In the 2004 playoffs, Curtis and the Rams made history. In their wildcard game against the Seahawks, Curtis had four catches for 107 yards. The Rams would win the game, becoming the first playoff team in NFL history to win a game without having a winning record. In their divisional playoff loss at Atlanta the following week, Curtis caught seven passes for 128 yards and a 57-yard touchdown catch where he beat Falcons' cornerback DeAngelo Hall. Curtis became the 2nd player in NFL history to have two back-to-back 100-yard receiving games in the playoffs before ever recording one in the regular season.

His playoff performance proved to be no fluke, as Curtis had an impressive 2005. On the year, Curtis recorded 60 receptions, 801 yards and six touchdowns, all of which were second on the team. He also had a rushing touchdown in a win against the Saints that year. Curtis would again be the Rams slot receiver in 2006.

=== Philadelphia Eagles ===
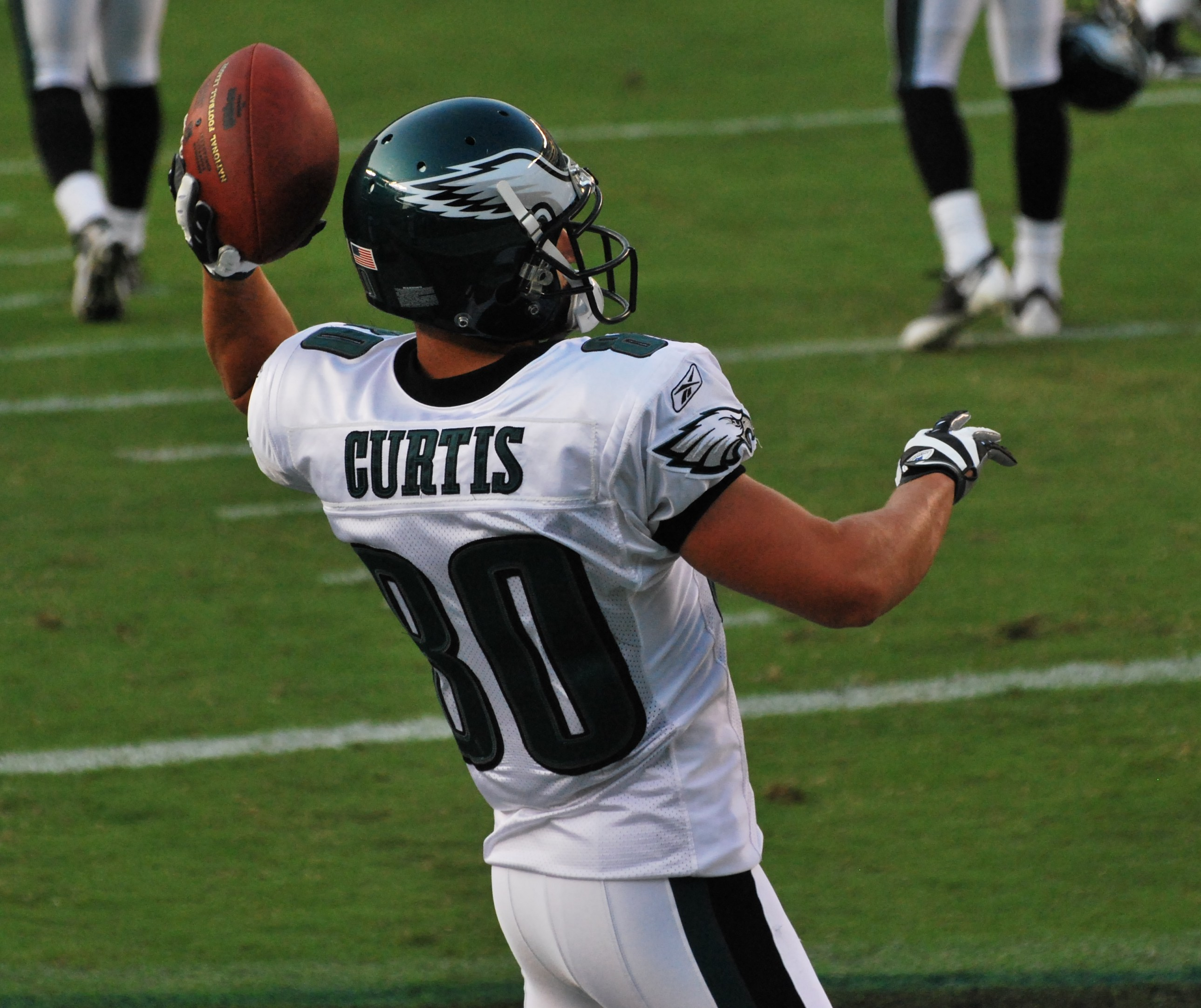
Curtis in August 2009.

On March 15, 2007, Curtis signed a 6-year, $32 million deal with the Philadelphia Eagles, including $9.5 million in guaranteed money. Curtis spent his whole career behind potential Hall of Famers Isaac Bruce and Torry Holt. Now, free from their shadow, he set career highs in his first year with the Eagles and finished the year with 1,110 yards, 77 receptions and 6 touchdowns. He was the eleventh receiver in Eagles history to reach over 1,000 receiving yards, and just the second to under Andy Reid.

Curtis had his best game on September 23, 2007, in the first half of a 56-21 Eagles win over the Detroit Lions. His nine catches for 205 yards and three touchdowns tied Lee Evans for the most receiving yards during the first half of a game since 1987, when Steve Largent had 224 yards during a replacement game. Curtis finished the day with 11 catches for 221 yards and three touchdowns. He became the first player in NFL history to recover his own team's fumble for a touchdown in back-to-back games when he fell on Reggie Brown's fumble in the 3rd quarter against the Buffalo Bills on December 30, 2007. He recovered a McNabb fumble for a score a week earlier at the New Orleans Saints on December 23, 2007. With his 77 receptions in 2007, became just the 4th wide receiver in Eagles history to record 75-or-more catches in a single season, joining Irving Fryar (88 in 1996, 86 in 1997), Fred Barnett (78 in 1994), and Terrell Owens (77 in 2004).

In 2008, Curtis only played 9 games in the season due to injury. He had surgery on August 21, 2008, to repair a sports hernia and was inactive for the first six games of the season. He was also inactive at Washington on December 21, 2008, with a calf strain. However, he had highlights against Cleveland, Curtis caught 4 receptions for 45 yards and a touchdown. In the season Curtis caught 33 balls for 390 yards, and two touchdowns. His return helped engineer an improbable run to the playoffs for Philadelphia, where the 5-5-1 Eagles would go 9-6-1 (6-3-1 in games Curtis played), and make it to the NFC Championship game. He led the team with 122 receiving yards on four catches in the NFC Championship game at Arizona on January 18, 2009, which tied a franchise postseason record among wide receivers.

In 2009, Curtis played in the Eagles first two games of the season, before requiring arthroscopic surgery on his left knee. He missed twelve games because of it, and did not return until week 15 against the San Francisco 49ers. He was released by the Eagles on March 18, 2010. He later attended workouts for the Giants and Lions but was not offered a contract.

During the 2010 offseason, Curtis underwent treatment for testicular cancer. After a successful surgery in September, Curtis announced he would be returning to the NFL.

=== Miami Dolphins ===
Curtis was signed by the Miami Dolphins on December 13, 2010. He managed just one catch for six yards in the two games he played. On December 28, 2010, he was released by the Dolphins.

=== Kansas City Chiefs ===
On January 5, 2011, Curtis signed with the Kansas City Chiefs prior to their playoff game against the Ravens. Curtis played 30 snaps in the Chiefs' playoff loss, catching one pass for three yards.

=== Tennessee Titans ===
On August 26, 2011, he signed with the Tennessee Titans. He signed in time to play in the preseason finale, where he caught two passes for 20 yards. However, Curtis broke his left hand in the game, and was placed on injured reserve before the season officially started.

== NFL career statistics ==
Legend
| **Bold** | Career high |

=== Regular season ===
| Year | Team | Games | | Receiving | | | | | |
| Year | Team | GP | GS | Tgt | Rec | Yds | Avg | Lng | TD |
|---|---|---|---|---|---|---|---|---|---|
| 2003 | STL | 4 | 1 | 5 | 4 | 13 | 3.3 | 8 | 0 |
| 2004 | STL | 15 | 0 | 50 | 32 | 421 | 13.2 | 41 | 2 |
| 2005 | STL | **16** | 9 | 97 | 60 | 801 | 13.4 | **83** | **6** |
| 2006 | STL | **16** | 1 | 57 | 40 | 479 | 12.0 | 42 | 4 |
| 2007 | PHI | **16** | **16** | **135** | **77** | **1,110** | **14.4** | 75 | **6** |
| 2008 | PHI | 9 | 8 | 63 | 33 | 390 | 11.8 | 32 | 2 |
| 2009 | PHI | 3 | 1 | 15 | 6 | 77 | 12.8 | 19 | 0 |
| 2010 | MIA | 2 | 0 | 2 | 1 | 6 | 6.0 | 6 | 0 |
| | | 81 | 36 | 424 | 253 | 3,297 | 13.0 | 83 | 20 |

=== Playoffs ===
| Year | Team | Games | | Receiving | | | | | |
| Year | Team | GP | GS | Tgt | Rec | Yds | Avg | Lng | TD |
|---|---|---|---|---|---|---|---|---|---|
| 2004 | STL | 2 | 2 | 17 | 11 | **235** | **21.4** | **57** | **1** |
| 2008 | PHI | **3** | **3** | **22** | **12** | 211 | 17.6 | 50 | 0 |
| 2010 | MIA | 1 | 0 | 3 | 1 | 3 | 3.0 | 3 | 0 |
| | | 6 | 5 | 42 | 24 | 449 | 18.7 | 57 | 1 |

== Personal life ==
Curtis is a member of the Church of Jesus Christ of Latter-day Saints also known as the Mormon faith; after high school, he served a two-year Mormon mission in London, England.

On September 23, 2010, Curtis received an orchiectomy due to testicular cancer, at the Huntsman Cancer Institute.
