= Mike Marquardt =

American football player (born 1982)

No. 77
- Position: Defensive tackle

Personal information
- Born: July 10, 1982 (age 44); Vista, California, U.S.
- Listed height: 6 ft 3 in (1.91 m)
- Listed weight: 302 lb (137 kg)

Career information
- College: Arizona State
- NFL draft: 2008: undrafted

Career history
- Cincinnati Bengals (2008)*; Carolina Panthers (2008)*; Philadelphia Eagles (2008)*; St. Louis Rams (2009)*; Washington Redskins (2009)*
- * Offseason or practice squad member only

Michael Marquardt (born July 10, 1982) is an American former football defensive tackle. He was signed by the Cincinnati Bengals as an undrafted free agent in 2008. He spent the 2008 season with the Philadelphia Eagles. He played college football at Arizona State.

Marquardt was also a member of the Carolina Panthers, Philadelphia Eagles, St. Louis Rams and Washington Redskins.

== Early life ==
Marquardt attended Rancho Buena Vista High School in Vista, California. He was named a Prep Star magazine All-American and named All C.I.F. and All-league as a senior. He also earned Palomar League Most-Valuable Player honors as a senior when he had 40 tackles and a team-leading 18 sacks while forcing four fumbles and returning one for a touchdown.

== College career ==
=== Brigham Young ===
Marquart began his college career at Brigham Young University in 2000, redshirting that year. In 2001, he played in 10 games for the Cougars and had 11 tackles, including five tackles and three sacks. After the 2001 season he served mission for the Church of Jesus Christ of Latter-day Saints in Bahía Blanca, Argentina. He returned for the 2004 season and he played in 11 games, totaling five tackles, including one tackle for loss.

=== Arizona State ===
Marquart sat out 2005 after transferring to Arizona State University. In 2006, he started 12 of 13 games played and was honorable mention All-Pac-10, totaling 25 tackles (18 solo), 7.5 tackles-for-loss, 3.5 sacks. As a senior, in 2007, he started 11 games and again earned honorable mention All-Pac-10 recognition. He totaled 23 tackles (11 solo), two fumble recoveries and 1.5 tackles-for-loss on the year. Both in 2006 and 2007 he was All-Academic Pac-10 and was a semifinalist for the 2007 Draddy Trophy, nicknamed the "Academic Hesiman".

=== Statistics ===
Year	Team	GP	GS	UA	AT	TT	T/L	Sacks	FF	FR	PD	INT
2001	Brigham Young	10	0	8	2	10	5	3	0	0	0	0
2004	Brigham Young	11	0	4	1	5	1	0	0	0	0	0
2006	Arizona State	13	12	18	7	25	7.5	3.5	0	0	1	0
2007	Arizona State	11	11	11	12	23	1.5	0	0	2	0	0
Totals		45	23	41	22	64	15	6.5	0	2	1	0

Key: GP - games played; GS - games started; UA - unassisted tackles; AT - assisted tackles; TT - total tackles; T/L - tackles for a loss; Sacks - ; FF – Forced fumble; FR – Fumbles recovered; PD - passes deflected; Int - interceptions

== Professional career ==
=== Pre-draft ===
Marquardt ran a 4.97 forty-yard dash.

=== Cincinnati Bengals ===
After going undrafted in the 2008 NFL draft, Marquardt signed with the Cincinnati Bengals as an undrafted free agent. He was waived by the team on July 7.

=== Carolina Panthers ===
Marquardt was then signed by the Carolina Panthers, but was waived on August 6, 2008.

=== Philadelphia Eagles ===
Marquardt was signed by the Philadelphia Eagles on August 10, 2008. He was waived by the team during final cuts, but re-signed to the practice squad on September 1.

=== St. Louis Rams ===
Marquardt was signed by the St. Louis Rams on April 2, 2009, only to be released a month later on May 1.

=== Washington Redskins ===
Marquardt was signed by the Washington Redskins on August 5, 2009, after the team waived defensive tackle Vaka Manupuna. He was waived on August 30.
