= 2011 Philadelphia Eagles season =

79th season in franchise history; derisively called "Dream Team"

- Owner: Jeffrey Lurie
- General manager: Howie Roseman
- Head coach: Andy Reid
- Home stadium: Lincoln Financial Field

Results
- Record: 8–8
- Division place: 2nd NFC East
- Playoffs: Did not qualify
- Pro Bowlers: RB LeSean McCoy; T Jason Peters; DE Jason Babin

The 2011 season was the Philadelphia Eagles' 79th in the National Football League (NFL) and their 13th under head coach Andy Reid. The Eagles had high hopes of competing for a Super Bowl after key offseason acquisitions, with backup quarterback Vince Young calling the roster a "dream team" – but they failed to improve on their 10–6 record from 2010 and missed the playoffs for the first time since 2007. However, they did win their last four games, in an attempt to pull out a miracle playoff berth, finishing 8–8, only one game behind the divisional winners and eventual Super Bowl champions, the New York Giants. They also swept the Dallas Cowboys and Washington Redskins for the first time since 2006 and 2009, respectively. The Eagles played all their home games at Lincoln Financial Field in Philadelphia, Pennsylvania. Until 2024, this would be the last season that the Eagles swept the Dallas Cowboys.

== Offseason ==
=== Personnel changes ===
On January 15, defensive coordinator Sean McDermott was fired. Defensive line coach Rory Segrest was fired on January 16. Former Tennessee Titans' defensive line coach Jim Washburn was hired to the same position by the Eagles' on January 19. Special teams quality control coach Jeff Nixon was hired by the Miami Dolphins as their running backs coach on January 20. Defensive backs coach and senior assistant Dick Jauron was hired by the Cleveland Browns as their new defensive coordinator on January 21. On January 25, linebackers coach Bill Shuey, who served on the Eagles' coaching staff for the past ten seasons, was let go after his contract was not renewed. On February 2, Juan Castillo, who served as the team's offensive line coach since 1998, was named the new defensive coordinator. That same day, Howard Mudd was hired as the new offensive line coach. Quarterback Coach James Urban left to take a job as the Wide Receiver Coach for the Cincinnati Bengals.

=== Roster changes ===
The Eagles made several high-profile additions in the offseason, including Dominique Rodgers-Cromartie, Nnamdi Asomugha, Vince Young, Ronnie Brown, Evan Mathis, Steve Smith from the rival New York Giants, and Jason Babin. With the numerous signings in addition to the previous years' players, Young later enthusiastically commented during a training camp interview, calling the 2011 Eagles a "dream team".

==== Free agents ====
| Position | Player | Tag | 2011 Team | Notes and references |
|---|---|---|---|---|
| K | David Akers | UFA | San Francisco 49ers | Given transitional tag prior to the lockout, but Akers did not sign it. The tag was rescinded after the lockout, due to new CBA rules. |
| LB | Stewart Bradley | UFA | Arizona Cardinals | |
| RB | Eldra Buckley | ERFA | Detroit Lions | Re-signed by the Eagles, released during final cuts. |
| C/G | Nick Cole | UFA | None | |
| LB | Omar Gaither | UFA | Carolina Panthers | |
| S | Antoine Harris | UFA | None | |
| RB | Jerome Harrison | UFA | Detroit Lions | |
| CB | Ellis Hobbs | UFA | N/A | Retired |
| G | Max Jean-Gilles | UFA | None | Signed with Cincinnati Bengals and Carolina Panthers, but did not play for either team. |
| LB | Akeem Jordan | UFA | Philadelphia Eagles | |
| DE | Bobby McCray | UFA | None | |
| S | Quintin Mikell | UFA | St. Louis Rams | |
| CB | Dimitri Patterson | UFA | Cleveland Browns | |
| P | Sav Rocca | UFA | Washington Redskins | |
| LB | Ernie Sims | UFA | Indianapolis Colts | |
| QB | Michael Vick | UFA | Philadelphia Eagles | signed franchise tender March 2 |
| G | Reggie Wells | UFA | Carolina Panthers | Re-signed with Eagles, but released during final cuts. |

| Player re-signed by the Eagles |

==== Signings ====
| Position | Player | Tag | 2010 Team | Date signed | Notes and references |
|---|---|---|---|---|---|
| DE/LB | Phillip Hunt | UFA | Winnipeg Blue Bombers (CFL) | February 11 | on active roster |
| LB | Rashad Jeanty | UFA | None | February 20 | released |
| CB | Isaiah Trufant | WVR | New York Jets | February 8 | released |
| CB | Nnamdi Asomugha | UFA | Oakland Raiders | July 28 | released |
| DE | Jason Babin | UFA | Tennessee Titans | July 30 | on active roster |
| RB | Ronnie Brown | UFA | Miami Dolphins | August 2 | |
| T | Ryan Harris | UFA | Denver Broncos | August 2 | released |
| DT | Cullen Jenkins | UFA | Green Bay Packers | July 30 | on active roster |
| TE | Donald Lee | UFA | Green Bay Packers | July 30 | released |
| G | Evan Mathis | UFA | Cincinnati Bengals | July 31 | on active roster |
| S | Jarrad Page | UFA | New England Patriots | August 2 | released |
| QB | Vince Young | UFA | Tennessee Titans | July 28 | on active roster |

=== Player selections ===
| Rd | Pick | Player | Pos | School | Signed | Notes |
|---|---|---|---|---|---|---|
| 1 | 23 | Danny Watkins | Guard | Baylor | – | |
| 2 | 54 | Jaiquawn Jarrett | Safety | Temple | – | |
| 3 | 90 | Curtis Marsh | Cornerback | Utah State | – | (Note: The team traded its third round pick (85th overall) to the Baltimore Ravens in exchange for a third round selection (90th overall) and a sixth round selection (191st overall).) |
| 4 | 116 | Casey Matthews | Linebacker | Oregon | – | (Note: The team acquired a fourth-round selection (104th overall) as part of an April 2010 trade that sent QB Donovan McNabb to the Washington Redskins. It was traded to the Tampa Bay Buccaneers in exchange for this fourth round selection and a fourth round selection in 2012.) |
| 4 | 120 | Alex Henery | Kicker | Nebraska | – | |
| 5 | 149 | Dion Lewis | Running back | Pittsburgh | – | (Note: The team acquired this fifth-round selection as part of a trade that sent a 2010 fifth-round selection to the San Diego Chargers.) |
| 5 | 161 | Julian Vandervelde | Guard | Iowa | – | (Note: The team traded its 2011 fifth-round selection (153rd overall) along with a 2011 seventh-round selection (227th overall) to the New York Jets in exchange for this fifth-round selection and a 2011 sixth-round selection (194th overall).) |
| 6 | 191 | Jason Kelce | Center | Cincinnati | – | (Note: The team traded its original sixth-round selection (#186 overall) to the Detroit Lions in exchange for a 2010 seventh-round selection (#220 overall; used to select LB Jamar Chaney) The team acquired an additional sixth-round selection (#184 overall) in a March 2010 trade that sent WR Reggie Brown to the Tampa Bay Buccaneers, but later traded this selection to the Arizona Cardinals in exchange for G Reggie Wells in September 2010.) (Note: See draft note 1.) |
| 6 | 193 | Brian Rolle | Linebacker | Ohio State | – | (Note: The team traded its sixth-round selection (194th overall) to the New England Patriots in exchange for this sixth-round selection.) |
| 7 | 237 | Greg Lloyd, Jr. | Linebacker | Connecticut | – | (Note: The team traded its original seventh-round selection (#225 overall) to the Baltimore Ravens in exchange for DE Antwan Barnes. The team acquired a new seventh-round selection (#227 overall) in a trade that sent G Stacy Andrews to the Seattle Seahawks. This seventh-round selection was traded to the Jets (see draft note 4).) (Note: Compensatory draft pick.) |
| 7 | 240 | Stanley Havili | Fullback | USC | – | (Note: Compensatory draft pick.) |

==== Draft notes ====
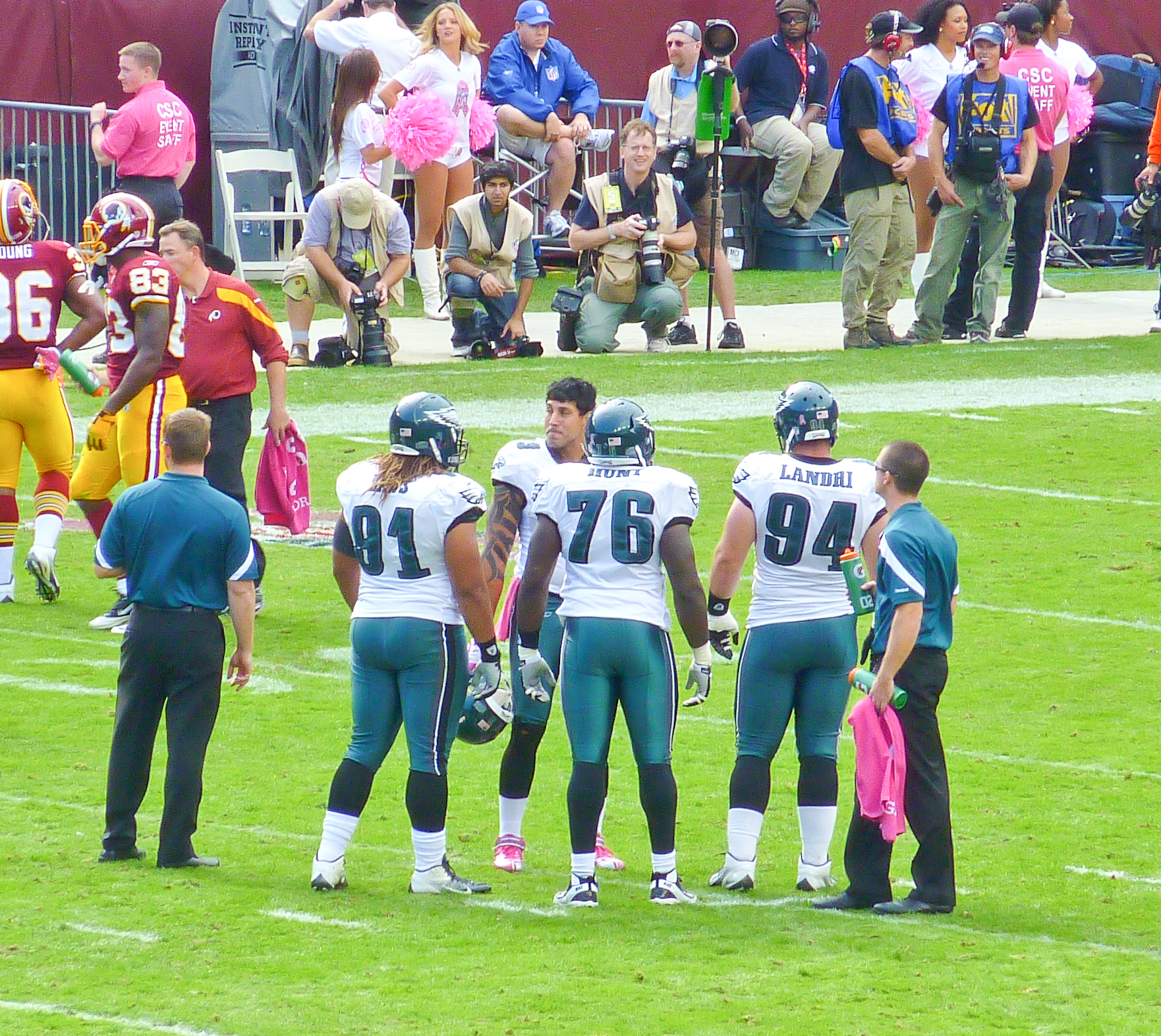
Jason Babin with the Eagles defense in week 6, October 16

== Preseason ==
=== Schedule ===
The Eagles' preseason schedule was announced on April 12, 2011.

| Week | Date | Opponent | Result | Record | Venue | Recap |
|---|---|---|---|---|---|---|
| 1 | August 11 | Baltimore Ravens | W 13–6 | 1–0 | Lincoln Financial Field | Recap |
| 2 | August 18 | at Pittsburgh Steelers | L 14–24 | 1–1 | Heinz Field | Recap |
| 3 | August 25 | Cleveland Browns | W 24–14 | 2–1 | Lincoln Financial Field | Recap |
| 4 | September 1 | at New York Jets | W 24–14 | 3–1 | MetLife Stadium | Recap |

=== Roster changes ===
==== Signings ====
On July 29, the Eagles signed quarterback Vince Young, one day after he was released by the Tennessee Titans. That same day, the Eagles also signed former Oakland Raiders' cornerback Nnamdi Asomugha to a five-year contract.

==== Trades ====
On July 28, quarterback Kevin Kolb was traded to the Arizona Cardinals in exchange for cornerback Dominique Rodgers-Cromartie and a 2012 second-round draft selection. On August 1, defensive tackle Brodrick Bunkley was traded to the Denver Broncos in exchange for a 2013 draft selection.

== Regular season ==
=== Schedule ===
| Week | Date | Opponent | Result | Record | Venue | Recap |
|---|---|---|---|---|---|---|
| 1 | September 11 | at St. Louis Rams | **W** 31–13 | 1–0 | Edward Jones Dome | Recap |
| 2 | September 18 | at Atlanta Falcons | **L** 31–35 | 1–1 | Georgia Dome | Recap |
| 3 | September 25 | **New York Giants** | **L** 16–29 | 1–2 | Lincoln Financial Field | Recap |
| 4 | October 2 | San Francisco 49ers | **L** 23–24 | 1–3 | Lincoln Financial Field | Recap |
| 5 | October 9 | at Buffalo Bills | **L** 24–31 | 1–4 | Ralph Wilson Stadium | Recap |
| 6 | October 16 | at **Washington Redskins** | **W** 20–13 | 2–4 | FedExField | Recap |
| 7 | Bye | | | | | |
| 8 | October 30 | **Dallas Cowboys** | **W** 34–7 | 3–4 | Lincoln Financial Field | Recap |
| 9 | November 7 | Chicago Bears | **L** 24–30 | 3–5 | Lincoln Financial Field | Recap |
| 10 | November 13 | Arizona Cardinals | **L** 17–21 | 3–6 | Lincoln Financial Field | Recap |
| 11 | November 20 | at **New York Giants** | **W** 17–10 | 4–6 | MetLife Stadium | Recap |
| 12 | November 27 | New England Patriots | **L** 20–38 | 4–7 | Lincoln Financial Field | Recap |
| 13 | December 1 | at Seattle Seahawks | **L** 14–31 | 4–8 | CenturyLink Field | Recap |
| 14 | December 11 | at Miami Dolphins | **W** 26–10 | 5–8 | Sun Life Stadium | Recap |
| 15 | December 18 | New York Jets | **W** 45–19 | 6–8 | Lincoln Financial Field | Recap |
| 16 | December 24 | at **Dallas Cowboys** | **W** 20–7 | 7–8 | Cowboys Stadium | Recap |
| 17 | January 1 | **Washington Redskins** | **W** 34–10 | 8–8 | Lincoln Financial Field | Recap |

Note: Intra-division opponents are in bold text.

=== Game summaries ===
==== Week 1: at St. Louis Rams ====
Week One: Philadelphia Eagles at St. Louis Rams – Game summary

| Quarter | 1 | 2 | 3 | 4 | Total |
|---|---|---|---|---|---|
| **Eagles** | 14 | 3 | 7 | 7 | **31** |
| Rams | 7 | 3 | 3 | 0 | **13** |

at Edward Jones Dome, St. Louis, Missouri

- Date: September 11
- Game time: 1:00 p.m. EDT/12:00 p.m. CDT
- Game weather: Played indoors (dome stadium)
- Game attendance: 56,722
- Referee: Gene Steratore
- TV announcers (Fox): Thom Brennaman, Brian Billick and Laura Okmin

Game information

**First quarter**

- STL – Steven Jackson 47-yard TD run, Josh Brown kick (STL 7–0)
- PHI – LeSean McCoy 7-yard TD pass from Michael Vick, Alex Henery kick (tied 7–7)
- PHI – Juqua Parker 56-yard fumble return for a TD, Alex Henery kick (PHI 14–7)

**Second quarter**

- STL – Josh Brown 49-yard field goal (PHI 14–10)
- PHI – Alex Henery 34-yard field goal (PHI 17–10)

**Third quarter**

- PHI – DeSean Jackson 6-yard TD pass from Michael Vick, Alex Henery kick (PHI 24–10)
- STL – Josh Brown 23-yard field goal (PHI 24–13)

**Fourth quarter**

- PHI – LeSean McCoy 49-yard TD run, Alex Henery kick (PHI 31–13)

**Top passers**

- PHI – Michael Vick: 14/32 187 Yds, 2 TD, 11 Rush, 97 Yds
- STL – Sam Bradford: 17/30 188 Yds

**Top rushers**

- PHI – LeSean McCoy: 15 Att, 122 Yds, 1 Rush TD, 2 Rec, 15 Yds, 1 Rec TD
- STL – Carnell Williams: 19 Att, 91 Yds, 5 Rec, 49 Yds

**Top receivers**

- PHI – DeSean Jackson: 6 Rec, 102 Yds, 1 TD
- STL – Brandon Gibson: 3 Rec, 50 Yds

**Top tacklers**

- PHI – Jamar Chaney: 6 Tackles
- STL – Craig Dahl: 8 Tackles, 1 Assist

==== Week 2: at Atlanta Falcons ====
Week Two: Philadelphia Eagles at Atlanta Falcons – Game summary

| Quarter | 1 | 2 | 3 | 4 | Total |
|---|---|---|---|---|---|
| Eagles | 0 | 10 | 21 | 0 | **31** |
| **Falcons** | 7 | 7 | 7 | 14 | **35** |

at Georgia Dome, Atlanta, Georgia

- Date: September 18
- Game time: 8:20 p.m. EDT
- Game weather: Played indoors (dome stadium)
- Game attendance: 69,608
- Referee: Carl Cheffers
- TV announcers (NBC): Al Michaels, Cris Collinsworth and Michele Tafoya

Game information

**First quarter**

- Roddy White 2-yard pass from Matt Ryan (Bryant kick), ATL 7–0

**Second quarter**

- Jeremy Maclin 5-yard pass from Michael Vick (Henery kick), tied 7–7
- Alex Henery 22-yard field goal, PHI 10–7
- Tony Gonzalez 4-yard pass from Matt Ryan (Bryant kick), ATL 14–10

**Third quarter**

- Tony Gonzalez 17-yard pass from Matt Ryan (Bryant kick), ATL 21–10
- Jeremy Maclin 36-yard pass from Michael Vick (Henery kick), ATL 21–17
- LeSean McCoy 8-yard run (Henery kick), PHI 24–21
- LeSean McCoy 2-yard run (Henery kick), PHI 31–21

**Fourth quarter**

- Ovie Mughelli 1-yard pass from Matt Ryan (Bryant kick), PHI 31–28
- Michael Turner 3-yard run (Bryant kick), ATL 35–31

**Top passers**

- PHI – Michael Vick – 19/28, 242 yards, 2 touchdowns, 1 interception
- ATL – Matt Ryan - 17/28, 195 yards, 4 touchdowns, 2 interceptions

**Top rushers**

- PHI – Lesean McCoy – 18 carries, 95 yards, 2 touchdowns
- ATL – Michael Turner – 21 carries, 114 yards, 1 touchdown

**Top receivers**

- PHI – Jeremy Maclin – 13 receptions, 171 yards, 2 touchdowns
- ATL – Tony Gonzalez – 7 receptions, 83 yards, 2 touchdowns

**Top tacklers**

- PHI – Jamar Chaney – 5 tackles, 4 assists
- ATL – Sean Weatherspoon – 7 tackles, 3 assists

==== Week 3: vs. New York Giants ====
Week Three: New York Giants at Philadelphia Eagles – Game summary

| Quarter | 1 | 2 | 3 | 4 | Total |
|---|---|---|---|---|---|
| **Giants** | 14 | 0 | 0 | 15 | **29** |
| Eagles | 0 | 13 | 3 | 0 | **16** |

at Lincoln Financial Field, Philadelphia, Pennsylvania

- Date: September 25
- Game time: 1:00 p.m. EDT
- Game weather: 78 °F (26 °C) (Sunny)
- Game attendance: 69,144
- Referee: Jeff Triplette
- TV announcers (Fox): Kenny Albert, Daryl Johnston and Tony Siragusa

Game information

**First quarter**

- NYG Jacobs 40-yard pass from Manning (Tynes kick) (6–73, 2:43) (NYG 7-0)
- NYG Cruz 74-yard pass from Manning (Tynes kick) (3–82, 1:26) (NYG 14-0)

**Second quarter**

- PHI Alex Henery 21-yard FG (15–77, 8:02) (NYG 14-3)
- PHI McCoy 11-yard run (Henery kick) (7–71, 3:21) (NYG 14-10)
- PHI Henery 38-yard FG (5–26, 1:12) (NYG 14-13)

**Third quarter**

- PHI Henery 21-yard FG (14–88, 8:52) (PHI 16-14)

**Fourth quarter**

- NYG Cruz 28-yard pass from Manning (Jacobs run) (7–54, 3:30) (NYG 22-16)
- NYG Bradshaw 18-yard pass from Manning (Tynes kick) (10–56, 4:28) (NYG 29-16)

**Top passers**

- NYG – Eli Manning – 16/23, 254 YDS, 4 TD, 0 INT
- PHI – Michael Vick – 16/23, 176 YDS, 0 TD, INT

**Top rushers**

- NYG – Ahmad Bradshaw – 15 CAR, 86 YDS
- PHI – LeSean McCoy – 24 CAR, 128 YDS, TD

**Top receivers**

- NYG – Victor Cruz – 3 REC, 110 YDS, 2 TD
- PHI – Jeremy Maclin – 5 REC, 69 YDS

**Top tacklers**

- NYG – Jason Pierre-Paul – 7 TKL, 2 AST, 2 SK
- PHI – Trent Cole – 4 TKL, AST, SK

==== Week 4: vs. San Francisco 49ers ====
Week Four: San Francisco 49ers at Philadelphia Eagles – Game summary

| Quarter | 1 | 2 | 3 | 4 | Total |
|---|---|---|---|---|---|
| **49ers** | 0 | 3 | 14 | 7 | **24** |
| Eagles | 7 | 13 | 3 | 0 | **23** |

at Lincoln Financial Field, Philadelphia, Pennsylvania

- Date: October 2
- Game time: 1:00 p.m. EDT
- Game weather: 57 °F (14 °C) (Cloudy)
- Game attendance: 69,144
- Referee: Alberto Riveron
- TV announcers (Fox): Ron Pitts and Jim Mora, Jr.

Game information

**First quarter**

**Second quarter**

**Third quarter**

**Fourth quarter**

**Top passers**

- SF – Alex Smith
- PHI – Michael Vick

**Top rushers**

- SF – Frank Gore
- PHI – Michael Vick

**Top receivers**

- SF – Michael Crabtree
- PHI – DeSean Jackson

**Top tacklers**

- SF – Dashon Goldson
- PHI – Jamar Chaney

==== Week 5: at Buffalo Bills ====
Week Five: Philadelphia Eagles at Buffalo Bills – Game summary

| Quarter | 1 | 2 | 3 | 4 | Total |
|---|---|---|---|---|---|
| Eagles | 0 | 7 | 7 | 10 | **24** |
| **Bills** | 7 | 14 | 10 | 0 | **31** |

at Ralph Wilson Stadium, Orchard Park, New York

- Date: October 9
- Game time: 1:00 p.m. EDT
- Game weather: 74 °F (23 °C) (Sunny)
- Game attendance: 69,803
- Referee: Walt Coleman
- TV announcers (Fox): Sam Rosen, Brian Billick and Laura Okmin

Game information

**First quarter**

**Second quarter**

**Third quarter**

**Fourth quarter**

**Top passers**

- PHI – Michael Vick
- BUF – Ryan Fitzpatrick

**Top rushers**

- PHI – Michael Vick
- BUF – Fred Jackson

**Top receivers**

- PHI – Jason Avant
- BUF – Fred Jackson

**Top tacklers**

- PHI – Nate Allen
- BUF – George Wilson

==== Week 6: at Washington Redskins ====
Week Six: Philadelphia Eagles at Washington Redskins – Game summary

| Quarter | 1 | 2 | 3 | 4 | Total |
|---|---|---|---|---|---|
| **Eagles** | 7 | 13 | 0 | 0 | **20** |
| Redskins | 0 | 3 | 3 | 7 | **13** |

at FedExField, Landover, Maryland

- Date: October 16
- Game time: 1:00 p.m. EDT
- Game weather: 68 °F (20 °C) (Sunny)
- Game attendance: 80,447
- Referee: Bill Leavy
- TV announcers (Fox): Sam Rosen, Brian Billick and Laura Okmin

Game information

**First quarter**

**Second quarter**

**Third quarter**

**Fourth quarter**

**Top passers**

- PHI – Michael Vick
- WAS – Rex Grossman

**Top rushers**

- PHI – Lesean McCoy
- WAS – Ryan Torain

**Top receivers**

- PHI – Jeremy Maclin
- WAS – Fred Davis

**Top tacklers**

- PHI – Kurt Coleman
- WAS – London Fletcher

==== Week 8: vs. Dallas Cowboys ====
Week Eight: Dallas Cowboys at Philadelphia Eagles – Game summary

| Quarter | 1 | 2 | 3 | 4 | Total |
|---|---|---|---|---|---|
| Cowboys | 0 | 0 | 0 | 7 | **7** |
| **Eagles** | 14 | 10 | 3 | 7 | **34** |

at Lincoln Financial Field, Philadelphia, Pennsylvania

- Date: October 30
- Game time: 8:20 p.m. EDT
- Game weather: 37 °F (3 °C) (Clear)
- Game attendance: 69,144
- Referee: Gene Steratore
- TV announcers (NBC): Al Michaels, Cris Collinsworth and Michele Tafoya

Game information

**First quarter**

**Second quarter**

**Third quarter**

**Fourth quarter**

**Top passers**

- DAL – Tony Romo
- PHI – Michael Vick

**Top rushers**

- DAL – DeMarco Murray
- PHI – Lesean McCoy

**Top receivers**

- DAL – Laurent Robinson
- PHI – Brent Celek

**Top tacklers**

- DAL – DeMarcus Ware
- PHI – Jamar Chaney

==== Week 9: vs. Chicago Bears ====
Week Nine: Chicago Bears at Philadelphia Eagles – Game summary

| Quarter | 1 | 2 | 3 | 4 | Total |
|---|---|---|---|---|---|
| **Bears** | 7 | 10 | 3 | 10 | **30** |
| Eagles | 0 | 10 | 14 | 0 | **24** |

at Lincoln Financial Field, Philadelphia, Pennsylvania

- Date: November 7
- Game time: 8:30 p.m. EST
- Game weather: 51 °F (11 °C) (Clear)
- Game attendance: 69,144
- Referee: Scott Green
- TV announcers (ESPN): Mike Tirico, Ron Jaworski, Jon Gruden, Suzy Kolber and Rachel Nichols

Game information

**First quarter**

- CHI – Matt Spaeth 5-yard TD pass from Jay Cutler, Robbie Gould kick (CHI 7–0)

**Second quarter**

- CHI – Robbie Gould 51-yard field goal (CHI 10–0)
- PHI – Alex Henery 47-yard field goal (CHI 10–3)
- PHI – Brian Rolle 22-yard fumble return for a TD, Alex Henery kick (Tied 10–10)
- CHI – Marion Barber 2-yard TD run, Josh Brown kick (CHI 17–10)

**Third quarter**

- PHI – Ronnie Brown 4-yard TD run, Alex Henery kick (Tied 17–17)
- PHI – LeSean McCoy 33-yard TD run, Alex Henery kick (PHI 24–17)
- CHI – Robbie Gould 38-yard field goal (PHI 24–20)

**Fourth quarter**

- CHI – Earl Bennett 5-yard TD pass from Jay Cutler, Robbie Gould kick (CHI 27–24)
- CHI – Robbie Gould 22-yard field goal (CHI 30–20)

**Top passers**

- CHI – Jay Cutler
- PHI – Michael Vick

**Top rushers**

- CHI – Matt Forte
- PHI – Lesean McCoy

**Top receivers**

- CHI – Earl Bennett
- PHI – Jeremy Maclin

**Top tacklers**

- CHI – Brian Urlacher
- PHI – Kurt Coleman

Coming off their divisional win over the Cowboys, the Eagles stayed at home for a Week 9 Monday night duel with the Chicago Bears. Philadelphia trailed early in the first quarter as Bears quarterback Jay Cutler completed a 5-yard touchdown pass to tight end Matt Spaeth. Chicago would add onto their lead in the second quarter as kicker Robbie Gould booted a 51-yard field goal. The Eagles answered with a 47-yard field goal from rookie kicker Alex Henery. followed by rookie linebacker Brian Rolle returning a fumble 22 yards for a touchdown, but the Bears would close out the half with running back Marion Barber getting a 2-yard touchdown run.

Philadelphia took the lead the third quarter with a 4-yard touchdown run from running back Ronnie Brown, followed by a 33-yard touchdown run from running back LeSean McCoy. Chicago replied with Gould making a 38-yard field goal. Afterwards, the Bears retook the lead with Cutler completing a 5-yard touchdown pass to wide receiver Earl Bennett, followed by Gould getting a 22-yard field goal. The Eagles tried to rally, including an unsuccessful fake punt by Chas Henry, but Chicago's defense held on to preserve the win.

With the loss, Philadelphia fell to 3–5.

==== Week 10: vs. Arizona Cardinals ====
Week Ten: Arizona Cardinals at Philadelphia Eagles – Game summary

| Quarter | 1 | 2 | 3 | 4 | Total |
|---|---|---|---|---|---|
| **Cardinals** | 0 | 7 | 0 | 14 | **21** |
| Eagles | 0 | 14 | 0 | 3 | **17** |

at Lincoln Financial Field, Philadelphia, Pennsylvania

- Date: November 13
- Game time: 1:00 p.m. EST
- Game weather: 70 °F (21 °C) (Sunny)
- Game attendance: 69,144
- Referee: Walt Anderson
- TV announcers (Fox): Dick Stockton, John Lynch and Jennifer Hale

Game information

**First quarter**

**Second quarter**

**Third quarter**

**Fourth quarter**

**Top passers**

- ARI – John Skelton
- PHI – Michael Vick

**Top rushers**

- ARI – Beanie Wells
- PHI – Lesean McCoy

**Top receivers**

- ARI – Larry Fitzgerald
- PHI – Brent Celek

**Top tacklers**

- ARI – Daryl Washington
- PHI – Kurt Coleman

==== Week 11: at New York Giants ====
Week Eleven: Philadelphia Eagles at New York Giants – Game summary

| Quarter | 1 | 2 | 3 | 4 | Total |
|---|---|---|---|---|---|
| **Eagles** | 0 | 10 | 0 | 7 | **17** |
| Giants | 0 | 3 | 0 | 7 | **10** |

at MetLife Stadium, East Rutherford, New Jersey

- Date: November 20
- Game time: 8:20 p.m. EST
- Game weather: 58 °F (14 °C) (Partly Cloudy)
- Game attendance: 79,743
- Referee: Mike Carey
- TV announcers (NBC): Al Michaels, Cris Collinsworth and Michele Tafoya

Game information

**First quarter**

**Second quarter**

**Third quarter**

**Fourth quarter**

**Top passers**

- PHI – Vince Young – 23/36, 258 YDS, 2 TD, 3 INT
- NYG – Eli Manning – 18/35, 264 YDS, TD, INT

**Top rushers**

- PHI – LeSean McCoy – 23 CAR, 113 YDS
- NYG – Brandon Jacobs – 12 CAR, 21 YDS

**Top receivers**

- PHI – DeSean Jackson – 6 REC, 88 YDS
- NYG – Victor Cruz – 6 REC, 128 YDS, TD

**Top tacklers**

- PHI – Jamar Chaney – 4 TKL, 2 AST
- NYG – Mathias Kiwanuka – 6 TKL, AST

==== Week 12: vs. New England Patriots ====
Week Twelve: New England Patriots at Philadelphia Eagles – Game summary

| Quarter | 1 | 2 | 3 | 4 | Total |
|---|---|---|---|---|---|
| **Patriots** | 7 | 17 | 7 | 7 | **38** |
| Eagles | 10 | 3 | 0 | 7 | **20** |

at Lincoln Financial Field, Philadelphia, Pennsylvania

- Date: November 27
- Game time: 4:15 p.m. EST
- Game weather: 63 °F (17 °C) (Sunny)
- Game attendance: 69,144
- Referee: Jerome Boger
- TV announcers (CBS): Greg Gumbel and Dan Dierdorf

Game information

**First quarter**

**Second quarter**

**Third quarter**

**Fourth quarter**

**Top passers**

- NE – Tom Brady
- PHI – Vince Young

**Top rushers**

- NE – Benjarvus Green-Ellis
- PHI – Vince Young

**Top receivers**

- NE – Deion Branch
- PHI – Jason Avant

**Top tacklers**

- NE – Kyle Arrington
- PHI – Kurt Coleman

The Eagles lost to the New England Patriots by a score of 38–20. Despite having a 7–0 lead to start the game, they were outscored by New England 38–13 to finish the game. During the third quarter, Eagles fans were heard booing on multiple occasions and chanting "Fire Andy" at one point. With the loss, the Eagles dropped to 4–7. They also fell to 1–5 at home and, dating back to Week 16 of 2010, the Eagles have lost 8 of their last 9 home games.

==== Week 13: at Seattle Seahawks ====
Week Thirteen: Philadelphia Eagles at Seattle Seahawks – Game summary

| Quarter | 1 | 2 | 3 | 4 | Total |
|---|---|---|---|---|---|
| Eagles | 0 | 7 | 0 | 7 | **14** |
| **Seahawks** | 7 | 10 | 7 | 7 | **31** |

at CenturyLink Field, Seattle, Washington

- Date: December 1
- Game time: 8:20 p.m. EST/5:20 p.m. PST
- Game weather: 38 °F (3 °C) (Clear)
- Game attendance: 67,039
- Referee: Pete Morelli
- TV announcers (NFLN): Brad Nessler, Mike Mayock and Alex Flanagan

Game information

**First quarter** **Second quarter** **Third quarter** **Fourth quarter**

**Top passers**

- PHI – Vince Young
- SEA – Tarvaris Jackson

**Top rushers**

- PHI – Lesean McCoy
- SEA – Marshawn Lynch

**Top receivers**

- PHI – Riley Cooper
- SEA – Zach Miller

**Top tacklers**

- PHI – Jamar Chaney
- SEA – Leroy Hill

==== Week 14: at Miami Dolphins ====
Week Fourteen: Philadelphia Eagles at Miami Dolphins – Game summary

| Quarter | 1 | 2 | 3 | 4 | Total |
|---|---|---|---|---|---|
| **Eagles** | 0 | 24 | 0 | 2 | **26** |
| Dolphins | 7 | 0 | 3 | 0 | **10** |

at Sun Life Stadium, Miami Gardens, Florida

- Date: December 11
- Game time: 1:00 p.m. EST
- Game weather: 75 °F (24 °C) (Cloudy)
- Game attendance: 67,823
- Referee: Ron Winter
- TV announcers (Fox): Chris Myers, Tim Ryan and Jaime Maggio

Game information

**First quarter**

**Second quarter**

**Third quarter**

**Fourth quarter**

**Top passers**

- PHI –
- MIA –

**Top rushers**

- PHI –
- MIA –

**Top receivers**

- PHI –
- MIA –

**Top tacklers**

- PHI –
- MIA –

==== Week 15: vs. New York Jets ====
Week Fifteen: New York Jets at Philadelphia Eagles – Game summary

| Quarter | 1 | 2 | 3 | 4 | Total |
|---|---|---|---|---|---|
| Jets | 0 | 13 | 0 | 6 | **19** |
| **Eagles** | 14 | 14 | 10 | 7 | **45** |

at Lincoln Financial Field, Philadelphia, Pennsylvania

- Date: December 18
- Game time: 4:15 p.m. EST
- Game weather: 32 °F (0 °C) (Sunny)
- Game attendance: 69,144
- Referee: Clete Blakeman
- TV announcers (CBS): Marv Albert and Rich Gannon

Game information

**First quarter**

**Second quarter**

**Third quarter**

**Fourth quarter**

**Top passers**

- NYJ – Mark Sanchez
- PHI – Michael Vick

**Top rushers**

- NYJ –
- PHI –

**Top receivers**

- NYJ –
- PHI –

**Top tacklers**

- NYJ –
- PHI –

==== Week 16: at Dallas Cowboys ====
Week Sixteen: Philadelphia Eagles at Dallas Cowboys – Game summary

| Quarter | 1 | 2 | 3 | 4 | Total |
|---|---|---|---|---|---|
| **Eagles** | 7 | 7 | 3 | 3 | **20** |
| Cowboys | 0 | 0 | 0 | 7 | **7** |

at Cowboys Stadium, Arlington, Texas

- Date: December 24
- Game time: 4:15 p.m. EST/3:15 p.m. CST
- Game weather: Played indoors (retractable roof closed)
- Game attendance: 84,834
- Referee: Bill Leavy
- TV announcers (Fox): Joe Buck, Troy Aikman and Pam Oliver

Game information

**First quarter**

**Second quarter**

**Third quarter**

**Fourth quarter**

**Top passers**

- PHI –Michael Vick
- DAL –Stephen Mcgee

**Top rushers**

- PHI –LeSean McCoy
- DAL –Sammy Morris

**Top receivers**

- PHI –DeSean Jackson
- DAL –Dez Bryant

**Top tacklers**

- PHI –Nnamdi Asomugha
- DAL –Anthony Spencer

With the win the Eagles improved to 7–8, and swept the season series of the Cowboys for the first time since 2006. However, they were eliminated from playoff contention thanks to the Giants' 29–14 victory over the Jets.

==== Week 17: vs. Washington Redskins ====
Week Seventeen: Washington Redskins at Philadelphia Eagles – Game summary

| Quarter | 1 | 2 | 3 | 4 | Total |
|---|---|---|---|---|---|
| Redskins | 0 | 0 | 7 | 3 | **10** |
| **Eagles** | 3 | 7 | 3 | 21 | **34** |

at Lincoln Financial Field, Philadelphia, Pennsylvania

- Date: January 1
- Game time: 1:00 p.m. EST
- Game weather: 53 °F (12 °C) (Sunny)
- Game attendance: 69,144
- Referee: Carl Cheffers
- TV announcers (Fox): Ron Pitts, Charles Davis, & Drea Avent

Game information

**First quarter**

**Second quarter**

**Third quarter**

**Fourth quarter**

**Top passers**

- WAS –
- PHI –

**Top rushers**

- WAS –
- PHI –

**Top receivers**

- WAS –
- PHI –

**Top tacklers**

- WAS –
- PHI –

With the win not only did the Eagles finished 8–8, but closed out the regular season winning the last 4 games (won last 3 games in 2007), while also sweeping the Redskins for the first time since 2009.

=== Standings ===
NFC East
| | W | L | T | PCT | DIV | CONF | PF | PA | STK |
|---|---|---|---|---|---|---|---|---|---|
| ^{(4)} New York Giants | 9 | 7 | 0 | .563 | 3–3 | 5–7 | 394 | 400 | W2 |
| Philadelphia Eagles | 8 | 8 | 0 | .500 | 5–1 | 6–6 | 396 | 328 | W4 |
| Dallas Cowboys | 8 | 8 | 0 | .500 | 2–4 | 6–6 | 369 | 347 | L2 |
| Washington Redskins | 5 | 11 | 0 | .313 | 2–4 | 5–7 | 288 | 367 | L2 |

== Staff ==
Philadelphia Eagles 2011 staff
| Front office: Chairman/CEO – Jeffrey Lurie; President – Joe Banner; General manager – Howie Roseman; Director of player personnel – Ryan Grigson; Director of pro personnel – Louis Riddick; Assistant director of college scouting – Anthony Patch; Head coaches: Head coach – Andy Reid; Assistant head coach/offensive coordinator – Marty Mornhinweg; Assistant to the head coach – Corey Matthaei; Offensive coaches: Quarterbacks – Doug Pederson; Running backs – Ted Williams; Tight ends – Tom Melvin; Offensive line – Howard Mudd; Assistant offensive line – Eugene Chung; Senior offensive assistant/wide receivers – David Culley; Offensive quality control – Matt Nagy; Statistical analysis coordinator – Mike Frazier | Defensive coaches: Defensive coordinator – Juan Castillo; Defensive line – Jim Washburn; Linebackers – Mike Caldwell; Defensive backs – Johnnie Lynn; Secondary/safeties – Mike Zordich; Defensive quality control – Bobby April III; Special teams coaches: Special teams coordinator – Bobby April; Special teams quality control – Duce Staley; Strength and conditioning: Head athletic trainer – Rick Burkholder; Head strength and conditioning – Barry Rubin; Assistant strength and conditioning – Roger Marandino |

== Final roster ==
2011 Philadelphia Eagles roster
| Quarterbacks (QB): 3 Mike Kafka; 7 Michael Vick; 9 Vince Young; Running backs (RB): 34 Ronnie Brown; 28 Dion Lewis KR; 25 LeSean McCoy; 32 Owen Schmitt; Wide receivers (WR): 81 Jason Avant; 14 Riley Cooper; 16 Chad Hall; 10 DeSean Jackson; 80 Ronald Johnson; 18 Jeremy Maclin; Tight ends (TE): 87 Brent Celek; 82 Clay Harbor | Offensive linemen (OL): 65 King Dunlap G/T; 79 Todd Herremans T; 67 Jamaal Jackson C; 74 Winston Justice T; 62 Jason Kelce C; 69 Evan Mathis G; 71 Jason Peters T; 73 Julian Vandervelde G; 63 Danny Watkins G; Defensive linemen (DL): 93 Jason Babin DE; 58 Trent Cole DE; 76 Phillip Hunt DE; 97 Cullen Jenkins DT; 94 Derek Landri DT; 91 Trevor Laws DT; 75 Juqua Parker DE; 98 Mike Patterson DT; 55 Darryl Tapp DE; 72 Cedric Thornton DT | Linebackers (LB): 51 Jamar Chaney MLB; 57 Keenan Clayton OLB; 54 Brandon Graham OLB; 56 Akeem Jordan OLB; 96 Greg Lloyd Jr. OLB; 50 Casey Matthews MLB; 59 Brian Rolle OLB; Defensive backs (DB): 29 Nate Allen FS; 24 Nnamdi Asomugha CB; 21 Joselio Hanson CB; 27 Brandon Hughes CB; 26 Jaiquawn Jarrett FS; 31 Curtis Marsh CB; 49 Tom Nelson SS; 23 Dominique Rodgers-Cromartie CB; 22 Asante Samuel CB; Special teams (ST): 46 Jon Dorenbos LS; 6 Alex Henery K; 8 Chas Henry P | Practice squad: 85 Brett Brackett TE; 77 Maurice Fountain DE; 84 Jamel Hamler WR; 39 Stanley Havili FB; 33 D. J. Johnson CB; 66 Dallas Reynolds G; 61 Zane Taylor C; Reserve: 95 Victor Abiamiri DT (IR); 30 Colt Anderson SS (IR); 42 Kurt Coleman SS (IR); 90 Antonio Dixon DT (IR); 53 Moise Fokou OLB (IR); 11 Steve Smith WR (IR); Rookies in italics 53 active, 6 reserve, 7 practice squad |
