= 2007 Philadelphia Eagles season =

75th season in franchise history

- Owner: Jeffrey Lurie
- Head coach: Andy Reid
- Offensive coordinator: Marty Mornhinweg
- Defensive coordinator: Jim Johnson
- Home stadium: Lincoln Financial Field

Results
- Record: 8–8
- Division place: 4th NFC East
- Playoffs: Did not qualify
- Pro Bowlers: RB Brian Westbrook; OG Shawn Andrews; DE Trent Cole

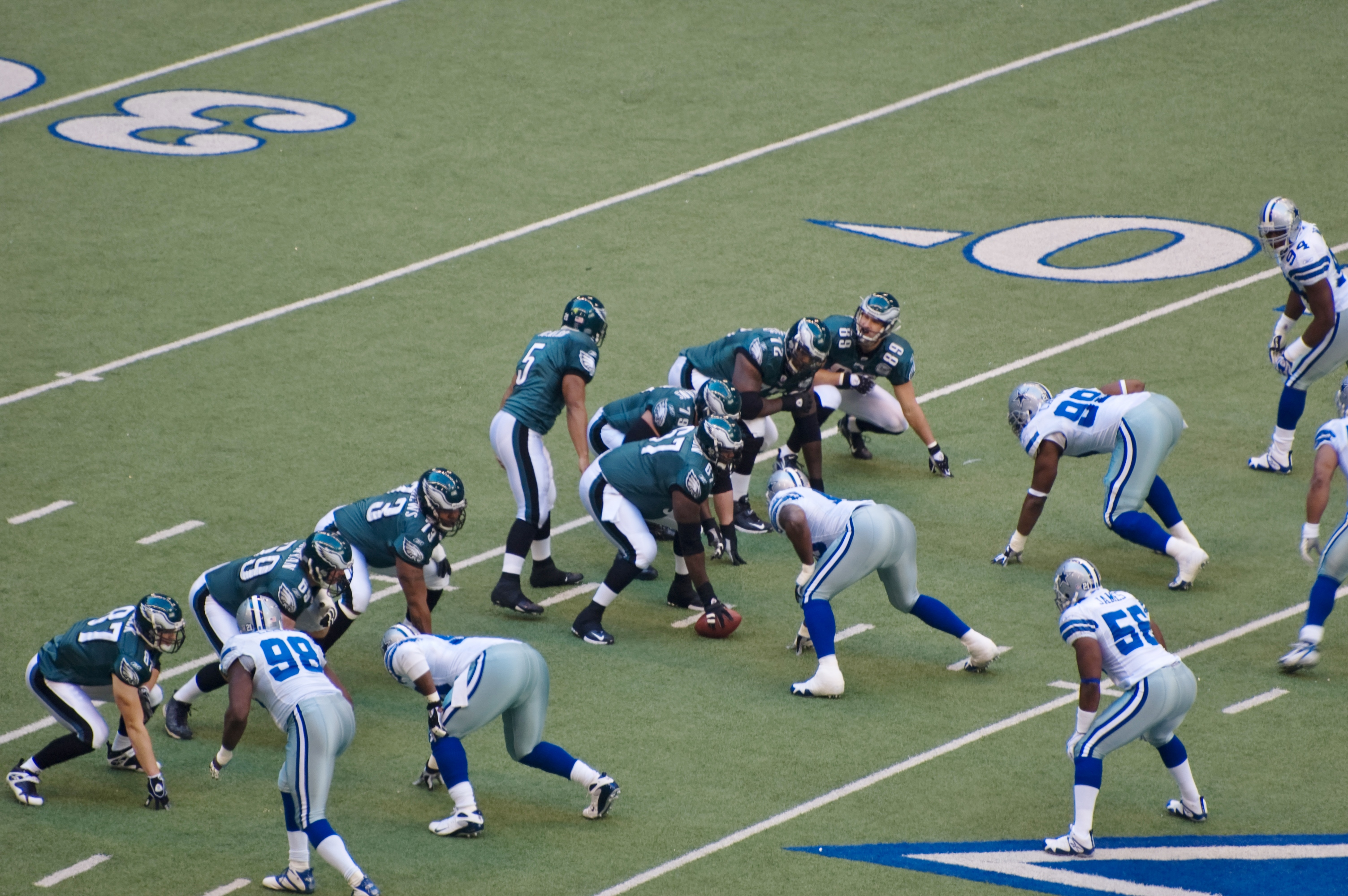
Philadelphia at Dallas in week 15 – Donovan McNabb calls a play to Matt Schobel

The 2007 Philadelphia Eagles season was the franchise's 75th season in the National Football League (NFL), and the ninth under head coach Andy Reid. The team failed to improve on their 10–6 record from 2006, finishing with an 8–8 record, a last-place finish in the NFC East and missing the playoffs.

After a playoff run in 2006 and the return of Donovan McNabb from injury, the Eagles were considered a legitimate Super Bowl contender. With McNabb and bona fide star running back Brian Westbrook, the offense was an obvious weapon, but there were questions about the defense. However, the team's first few games displayed a tough Jim Johnson "bend but don't break defense" and an inconsistent offense. The Eagles dropped three of their first four, but they unleashed an offensive outburst in a Week 3 blowout over the Detroit Lions 56–21. A primetime loss to the Dallas Cowboys in early November left Philadelphia 3–5.

The Eagles rallied and won a road game over the Washington Redskins the next week, and followed that with a win at home against the Miami Dolphins. In the win over Miami, McNabb went down with another November injury, the fourth time in six seasons that had occurred. The next three games, all against winning clubs, would prove to be the crux of the season for Philadelphia. Backup A. J. Feeley almost pulled off a big upset of the New England Patriots, who would finish the regular season 16–0, but a fourth quarter lead was surrendered. The Eagles would again lose second half leads to the Seattle Seahawks and their rival and eventual world champion New York Giants. These losses wiped out any chances of making the playoffs. The team finished the season with three straight wins, including a 10–6 win over the Cowboys, who were 12–1 entering the game.

Despite missing two games, McNabb threw for 3,324 yards, 19 touchdowns, 7 interceptions, and completed 61.5 percent of his passes to go with his 89.9 passer rating. Westbrook had one of the top seasons of any running back in the league,rushing for 1,333 yards (4.8 yards per carry) and 7 touchdowns and catching 90 passes for 771 yards and 5 touchdowns. He contributed 12 total touchdowns and 2,144 yards from scrimmage. New acquisition Kevin Curtis led the team with 1,110 receiving yards and 6 touchdown receptions (half of them coming against Detroit). Third-year receiver Reggie Brown had a slow start, but caught 61 passes for 780 yards and 4 scores. On defense, Trent Cole's 12.5 sacks earned him a Pro Bowl spot and second-year linebacker Omar Gaither led the team with 70 tackles. As a unit, the defense came up with several important goal-line stands throughout the season. Cole became the first Philadelphia Eagle since Hugh Douglas in 2002 to have a 12.5-sack season.

== Offseason ==
After returning to the top of the NFC East in 2006, it was an offseason of controversial transactions for the Eagles. The fates of quarterback Jeff Garcia and wide receiver Donte' Stallworth were the two immediate questions facing the Eagles after the season ended. Ultimately, the team decided to keep neither of them. The Eagles signed A. J. Feeley to a three-year contract to be the backup quarterback, allowing Garcia to sign with the Tampa Bay Buccaneers in March 2007. A week later, Stallworth inked a deal with the New England Patriots.

Philadelphia filled the new hole in the receiving corps by signing free agent Kevin Curtis from the St. Louis Rams. They then made a trade with the Buffalo Bills on March 26, 2007, sending longtime defensive tackle Darwin Walker to the Bills in exchange for Takeo Spikes to provide much-needed linebacker help, and backup quarterback Kelly Holcomb.

In the draft, the Eagles traded down, selecting University of Houston quarterback Kevin Kolb in the second round. The selection of Kolb sent a signal that the Eagles were looking towards a point in the future past Donovan McNabb, who had missed significant time in the three of the past five seasons.

In training camp and the preseason, McNabb, wearing a knee brace, showed that he had recovered from his knee surgery and was ready to go. He stated, as he did the season before, that the team was capable of reaching the Super Bowl. He was stunned when Eagles' management decided to cut veteran middle linebacker Jeremiah Trotter on August 21.

The talk of the preseason turned out to be the booming punts of Australian rules football import Saverio Rocca. The Aussie outbooted veteran Dirk Johnson to earn the starting job.

== Staff ==
Philadelphia Eagles 2007 staff
Front office: Chairman/CEO – Jeffrey Lurie; President/COO – Joe Banner; General manager – Tom Heckert Jr.; Vice president of player personnel – Jason Licht; Vice president of football administration – Howie Roseman; Director of pro personnel – Scott Cohen; Director of college scouting – Ryan Grigson; Head coaches: Head coach – Andy Reid; Assistant head coach/offensive coordinator – Marty Mornhinweg; Offensive coaches: Quarterbacks – Pat Shurmur; Running backs – Ted Williams; Wide receivers – David Culley; Tight ends – Tom Melvin; Offensive line – Juan Castillo; Offensive assistant/assistant special teams – Jeff Nixon; Offensive quality control – James Urban; Statistical analysis coordinator – Mike Frazier	Defensive coaches: Defensive coordinator – Jim Johnson; Defensive line – Pete Jenkins; Linebackers – Sean McDermott; Secondary – Trent Walters; Defensive assistant/quality control – Bill Shuey; Training camp intern – Mike Caldwell; Special teams coaches: Special teams coordinator/defensive backs – John Harbaugh; Special teams coordinator – Rory Segrest; Strength and conditioning: Head athletic trainer – Rick Burkholder; Head strength and conditioning – Mike Wolf; Assistant strength and conditioning – Bob Rogucki

== Philadelphia Eagles Draft ==
2007 Philadelphia Eagles draft
Round	Pick	Player	Position	College	Notes
2	36	Kevin Kolb	QB	Houston	From Dallas via Cleveland
2	57	Victor Abiamiri	DE	Notre Dame	
3	87	Stewart Bradley	LB	Nebraska	From Dallas
3	90	Tony Hunt	RB	Penn State	
5	159	C. J. Gaddis	CB	Clemson	From Dallas
5	162	Brent Celek	TE	Cincinnati	
6	201	Rashad Barksdale	CB	Albany	
7	236	Nate Ilaoa	RB	Hawaii	
Made roster † Pro Football Hall of Fame * Made at least one Pro Bowl during career

== Roster ==
=== Final roster ===
Philadelphia Eagles 2007 final roster
Quarterbacks: 14 A. J. Feeley; 4 Kevin Kolb; 5 Donovan McNabb; Running backs: 28 Correll Buckhalter KR; 29 Tony Hunt; 25 Reno Mahe PR; 38 Thomas Tapeh FB; 36 Brian Westbrook; Wide receivers: 81 Jason Avant; 84 Hank Baskett; 86 Reggie Brown; 80 Kevin Curtis; 83 Greg Lewis; Tight ends: 87 Brent Celek; 89 Matt Schobel; 82 L. J. Smith	Offensive linemen: 73 Shawn Andrews G; 59 Nick Cole C/G; 79 Todd Herremans G; 67 Jamaal Jackson C; 62 Max Jean-Gilles G; 74 Winston Justice T; 69 Jon Runyan T; 72 Tra Thomas T; 71 Scott Young G; Defensive linemen: 78 Victor Abiamiri DE; 97 Brodrick Bunkley DT; 58 Trent Cole DE; 90 Darren Howard DE; 93 Jevon Kearse DE; 98 Mike Patterson DT; 77 LaJuan Ramsey DT; 94 Montae Reagor DT; 75 Juqua Thomas DE; 66 Kimo von Oelhoffen DT	Linebackers: 55 Stewart Bradley OLB; 96 Omar Gaither MLB; 57 Chris Gocong OLB; 56 Akeem Jordan OLB; 52 Pago Togafau MLB; Defensive backs: 24 Sheldon Brown CB; 41 Tanard Davis CB; 20 Brian Dawkins FS; 35 Nick Graham CB; 22 Joselio Hanson CB; 21 Will James CB; 27 Quintin Mikell FS/SS; 32 Marcus Paschal CB/S; 30 J. R. Reed FS/SS/KR; 26 Lito Sheppard CB; Special teams: 2 David Akers K; 46 Jon Dorenbos LS; 6 Sav Rocca P	Reserve lists: 37 Sean Considine S (IR); 23 Ryan Moats RB (IR); 95 Jerome McDougle DE (IR); 64 Stefan Rodgers T (IR); 91 Ian Scott DT (IR); 51 Takeo Spikes LB (IR); Practice squad: 63 Jeremy Clark DT; 34 Jason Davis FB; 31 Therrian Fontenot CB; 65 Xzavie Jackson DE; 53 William Kershaw LB; 68 Ramiro Pruneda T ^{Int'l}; 13 Bill Sampy WR; 54 Kyle Shotwell LB; Rookies in italics 53 active, 6 inactive, 8 practice squad

== Schedule ==
=== Preseason ===
Week	Date	Opponent	Result	Record	Venue	Recap
1	August 13	at Baltimore Ravens	**L** 3–29	0–1	M&T Bank Stadium	Recap
2	August 17	Carolina Panthers	**W** 27–10	1–1	Lincoln Financial Field	Recap
3	August 26	at Pittsburgh Steelers	**L** 13–27	1-2	Heinz Field	Recap
4	August 30	New York Jets	**L** 11–13	1-3	Lincoln Financial Field	Recap

=== Regular season ===
Week	Date	Opponent	Result	Record	Venue	Recap
1	September 9	at Green Bay Packers	**L** 13–16	0–1	Lambeau Field	Recap
2	September 17	**Washington Redskins**	**L** 12–20	0–2	Lincoln Financial Field	Recap
3	September 23	Detroit Lions	**W** 56–21	1–2	Lincoln Financial Field	Recap
4	September 30	at **New York Giants**	**L** 3–16	1–3	Giants Stadium	Recap
5	Bye					
6	October 14	at New York Jets	**W** 16–9	2–3	Giants Stadium	Recap
7	October 21	Chicago Bears	**L** 16–19	2–4	Lincoln Financial Field	Recap
8	October 28	at Minnesota Vikings	**W** 23–16	3–4	Hubert H. Humphrey Metrodome	Recap
9	November 4	**Dallas Cowboys**	**L** 17–38	3–5	Lincoln Financial Field	Recap
10	November 11	at **Washington Redskins**	**W** 33–25	4–5	FedExField	Recap
11	November 18	Miami Dolphins	**W** 17–7	5–5	Lincoln Financial Field	Recap
12	November 25	at New England Patriots	**L** 28–31	5–6	Gillette Stadium	Recap
13	December 2	Seattle Seahawks	**L** 24–28	5–7	Lincoln Financial Field	Recap
14	December 9	**New York Giants**	**L** 13–16	5–8	Lincoln Financial Field	Recap
15	December 16	at **Dallas Cowboys**	**W** 10–6	6–8	Texas Stadium	Recap
16	December 23	at New Orleans Saints	**W** 38–23	7–8	Louisiana Superdome	Recap
17	December 30	Buffalo Bills	**W** 17–9	8–8	Lincoln Financial Field	Recap

Note: Intra-division opponents are in bold text.

== Standings ==
NFC East
	W	L	T	PCT	DIV	CONF	PF	PA	STK
^{(1)} Dallas Cowboys	13	3	0	.813	4–2	10–2	455	325	L1
^{(5)} New York Giants	10	6	0	.625	3–3	7–5	373	351	L1
^{(6)} Washington Redskins	9	7	0	.563	3–3	7–5	334	310	W4
Philadelphia Eagles	8	8	0	.500	2–4	5–7	336	300	W3

== Regular season ==
=== Week 1: at Green Bay Packers ===
Quarter	1	2	3	4	Total
Eagles	0	10	3	0	13
Packers	10	0	3	3	16

at Lambeau Field, Green Bay, Wisconsin

- Game weather: 63 °F (17 °C), Mostly Cloudy
- Game attendance: 70,598
- TV announcers (Fox): Kenny Albert (play-by-play), Daryl Johnston (color commentator) and Tony Siragusa (sideline reporter)

Two muffed punts hurt the Eagles in their season opener against Brett Favre and the Green Bay Packers. After Green Bay's first drive, Philadelphia's punt return man Greg Lewis muffed the punt which resulted in a fumble recovery in the end zone for the Packers. A 53-yard Green Bay field goal put the Eagles in a 10–0 deficit. Sheldon Brown's interception led to a field goal in the second quarter. Jason Avant's nine-yard touchdown reception from Donovan McNabb tied the game, and in the third quarter, David Akers made his second field goal from 47 yards out to make it 13–10 Philadelphia. Favre responded with a 13-play field goal drive to even the score. Later, J. R. Reed muffed a punt and the Packers recovered at the Eagles 31-yard line and Mason Crosby kicked a 42-yard game winner. Brian Westbrook had 131 all-purpose yards and Avant had three catches for 54 yards and a touchdown. The defense collected four sacks, two turnovers, and only allowed 46 rushing yards. This was the only game that the Packers offense did not score a touchdown.

=== Week 2: vs. Washington Redskins ===
Quarter	1	2	3	4	Total
Redskins	3	7	3	7	20
Eagles	0	6	3	3	12

at Lincoln Financial Field, Philadelphia

- Game weather: 60 °F (16 °C), Partly Cloudy
- Game attendance: 67,726
- TV announcers (ESPN): Mike Tirico (play-by-play), Ron Jaworski and Tony Kornheiser (color commentators)

Playing their home opener on Monday Night Football, the Eagles lost a 20–12 decision to the Washington Redskins. A long reception by Santana Moss led to a first-quarter field goal for the Redskins. The Eagles responded with a pair of David Akers field goals in the second quarter to take a 6–3 lead. With nine seconds remaining in the half, Washington quarterback Jason Campbell passed to Chris Cooley in the end zone for a touchdown and Redskin lead. The teams traded field goals in the third quarter, and Clinton Portis rushed for a six-yard touchdown early in the final quarter to make it 20–9. Donovan McNabb drove the Eagles to a field goal to bring them within eight points. On their last series, the Eagles got to the Washington nine-yard line, but the drive stalled there, preserving the Redskin victory. McNabb threw for 240 yards, Brian Westbrook had 162 all-purpose yards, and Akers connected on four field goals. This game played a big part in costing the Eagles a shot at the postseason. They finished one game behind the Redskins for the 6th and final playoff spot. It was also the first time since 2003 that the Eagles dropped their first two games.

=== Week 3: vs. Detroit Lions ===
Quarter	1	2	3	4	Total
Lions	7	14	0	0	21
Eagles	21	21	7	7	56

at Lincoln Financial Field, Philadelphia

- Game weather: 78 °F (26 °C), Clear
- Game attendance: 67,570
- TV announcers (Fox): Dick Stockton (play-by-play) and Brian Baldinger (color commentator)

Attired in their throwback uniforms of yellow and baby blue, the Eagles won their first game, a 56–21 rout of the Detroit Lions. The offense scored touchdowns on their first five possessions. Brian Westbrook ran for a 25-yard rushing touchdown three minutes into the game. The Lions tied the score, but the Eagles came right back with another Westbrook rushing score. Then, Donovan McNabb and receiver Kevin Curtis hooked up on 68-yard touchdown pass. Early in the second quarter, McNabb passed to Curtis again, this time for a 12-yard score and a 28–7 Eagles lead. A few minutes later, McNabb found Curtis for a 43-yard touchdown pass, Curtis's third touchdown in a seven-minute span. Jon Kitna attempted to rally the Lions, throwing two second-quarter touchdown passes, but McNabb fed Westbrook a short pass that went for a 43-yard touchdown, making it 42–21. The Philadelphia defense tightened up in the second half, while Correll Buckhalter and Tony Hunt added short rushing touchdowns for the Eagles. McNabb, who had a perfect quarterback rating and did most of his damage in the first half, was 21 for 26 with 381 passing yards and four touchdowns. Curtis caught eleven passes for 221 yards and three scores. Westbrook had over 100 yards both rushing and receiving, with two rushing touchdowns and one receiving touchdown. Defensively, the Eagles recorded nine sacks.

=== Week 4: at New York Giants ===
Quarter	1	2	3	4	Total
Eagles	0	0	0	3	3
Giants	0	7	9	0	16

at Giants Stadium, East Rutherford, New Jersey

- Game weather: 64 °F (18 °C), Clear
- Game attendance: 78,862
- TV announcers (NBC): Al Michaels (play-by-play) and John Madden (color commentator)

The New York Giants tied an NFL record with twelve sacks as they dealt the Eagles a 16–3 loss. Philadelphia entered the game with five starters out due to injury, including running back Brian Westbrook. Penalties, sacks, and the absence of Westbrook stymied the offense, which scored 56 points last week, throughout the first three quarters. The Giants took the lead on a touchdown reception by Plaxico Burress in the second quarter. A botched handoff led to a defensive touchdown for Kawika Mitchell and a 16–0 New York lead. David Akers' 53-yard field goal in the fourth quarter allowed the Eagles to avoid a shutout. Osi Umenyiora had six of the Giants' sacks. Correll Buckhalter rushed for 103 yards in the defeat. The loss drops Philadelphia to 1–3, their worst start since 1999, as they entered their bye week.

=== Week 6: at New York Jets ===
Quarter	1	2	3	4	Total
Eagles	7	3	6	0	16
Jets	3	3	0	3	9

at The Meadowlands, East Rutherford, New Jersey

- Game weather: 62 °F (17 °C), Clear
- Game attendance: 77,189
- TV announcers (Fox): Matt Vasgersian (play-by-play), Daryl Johnston (color commentator) and Tony Siragusa (sideline reporter)

Coming off of their bye week, the Eagles returned to the Meadowlands and beat the throwback-clad New York Jets 16–9. A 36-yard gain by Thomas Jones helped set up a short field goal by Mike Nugent on New York's opening drive. On third and long on the Eagles' ensuing possession, Donovan McNabb connected with Kevin Curtis, who shook free from a tackle and scored on a 75-yard reception. In the second quarter, David Akers kicked a 22-yard field goal to make it 10–3 Eagles. After the Jets narrowed it to 10–6, the Eagles embarked on a 16-play drive that ended on an Akers' field goal miss. Just before halftime, Akers missed again wide right. He made a pair of shorter field goals in the third quarter to stretch Philadelphia's lead to 16–6. A McNabb interception gave the Jets the ball inside the Eagles' red zone, but New York came away with only a field goal, leaving them down by a touchdown. On their next possession, late in the fourth quarter, the Jets managed to get a 2nd and 1 situation at the Eagles' four yard-line. The Philadelphia defense held and the Eagles came away with a 16–9 victory. Brian Westbrook had 120 rushing yards and Curtis had 121 receiving yards with a touchdown. McNabb had 278 passing yards and Akers was three for five in the field goal department. The Eagles' record went to 2–3, as well as going 9–0 coming off a bye-week under coach Reid.

=== Week 7: vs. Chicago Bears ===
Quarter	1	2	3	4	Total
Bears	0	3	3	13	19
Eagles	3	6	0	7	16

at Lincoln Financial Field, Philadelphia

- Game weather: 75 °F (24 °C), Sunny
- Game attendance: 67,806
- TV announcers (Fox): Dick Stockton (play-by-play) and Brian Baldinger (color commentator)

The Bears traveled to Philadelphia to take on the Eagles. The game was a defensive struggle throughout and a field goal fest through the first three quarters. Eagles kick David Akers connected on field goals of 24, 33, and 37. Bears kicker Robbie Gould hit on field goals of 31, 22, 41, and 45 respectively. The Bears held a three-point lead late until Eagles quarterback Donovan McNabb threw a touchdown strike to tight end Matt Schobel to give the Eagles a 16–12 lead. Eagles punter Sav Rocca pinned the Bears deep in their own territory with under two minutes remaining and no timeouts left, leaving the Bears to have to cover 97 yards if they wished to take the lead. Bears quarterback Brian Griese marched the team down the field and capped off the drive with a 15-yard touchdown pass to wide receiver Muhsin Muhammad with nine seconds remaining. The final was 19–16 Bears. The Eagles fell short on their final opportunity, and fell to 2–4.

=== Week 8: at Minnesota Vikings ===
Quarter	1	2	3	4	Total
Eagles	3	14	3	3	23
Vikings	7	3	3	3	16

at Hubert H. Humphrey Metrodome, Minneapolis

- Game attendance: 63,019
- TV announcers (Fox): Dick Stockton (play-by-play) and Brian Baldinger (color commentator)

Coming off their last-second home loss to Chicago, the Eagles ground out a 23–16 victory on the road against a Minnesota Vikings team coached by former Andy Reid protege Brad Childress. Rookie phenom Adrian Peterson and quarterback Kelly Holcomb, who spent the offseason on the Eagles’ roster, took the Vikings down the field for the game's first score – a nine-yard touchdown pass to Visanthe Shiancoe. A 50-yard reception by Greg Lewis down the field set up David Akers’ first field goal, then Donovan McNabb guided the Eagles to a touchdown drive early in the second quarter, with Brian Westbrook the recipient of a short six-yard scoring pass. Westbrook carried it up the middle from the one-yard line on Philadelphia's next drive to make it 17–7. Ryan Longwell booted a 39-yard field goal for Minnesota to draw the score to 17–10 later in the second quarter. Akers and Longwell traded field goals in the third quarter to make it 20–13. A 48-yarder by Longwell in the final quarter drew the Vikings to within four points, but they would get no closer, while Akers added his third field goal to restore the seven-point lead. McNabb's 333 passing yards were his most since the Detroit game, while Reggie Brown topped 100 yards for the first time all season. Westbrook had 92 all-purpose yards and a touchdown on the ground and in the air. Trent Cole recorded two sacks.

=== Week 9: vs. Dallas Cowboys ===
Quarter	1	2	3	4	Total
Cowboys	14	7	14	3	38
Eagles	7	0	3	7	17

at Lincoln Financial Field, Philadelphia

- Game weather: 49 °F (9 °C), Mostly Cloudy
- Game attendance: 67,688
- TV announcers (NBC): Al Michaels (play-by-play) and John Madden (color commentator)

The division-leading Dallas Cowboys and Terrell Owens handed the Eagles a decisive 38–17 loss on Sunday night football in Philadelphia. Julius Jones powered into the end zone from two yards out on Dallas’ opening drive, but Brian Westbrook answered with a short touchdown of his own after a 45-yard reception by Reggie Brown gave the Eagles’ first-and-goal. Then Tony Romo took over, hitting Tony Curtis for a short passing touchdown. Marion Barber III carried it in from five yards out for Dallas after Donovan McNabb was intercepted by the Cowboys’ defense. Romo connected with Owens for a 45-yard bomb in the third quarter, making the score 28–7 Dallas. After a David Akers’ field goal, Romo got his third touchdown on a 20-yard pass to tight end Jason Witten. McNabb finished the scoring with a 10-yard touchdown pass to Hank Baskett. McNabb passed for a touchdown and 264 yards, but also two interceptions. Westbrook racked up 156 all-purpose yards in another strong showing. Owens burned the Eagles’ defense for 174 receiving yards. Philadelphia fell to 3–5 and the team was largely uncompetitive against the Dallas squad.

=== Week 10: at Washington Redskins ===
Quarter	1	2	3	4	Total
Eagles	7	0	6	20	33
Redskins	0	12	3	10	25

at FedExField, Landover, Maryland

- Game weather: 49 °F (9 °C), Sunny
- Game attendance: 90,218
- TV announcers (Fox): Kenny Albert (play-by-play), Daryl Johnston (color commentator) and Tony Siragusa (sideline reporter)

The team rallied for a win over the Washington Redskins at FedExField in week 10. Penalties on Washington's defense helped allow a short McNabb to Brian Westbrook touchdown pass on Philadelphia's opening drive. A fumble by L. J. Smith gave Washington the ball inside Eagle territory, and Jason Campbell capitalized with a touchdown pass to James Thrash, the former Eagle. The extra point was missed, but Campbell hit Thrash for another score later in the second quarter. The two-point conversion failed, leaving it 12–7 Washington. A Redskin field goal stretched Philadelphia's deficit to 15–7 in the third quarter, but L. J. Smith, who spent much of the early season injured, caught an eight-yard touchdown from McNabb. The Eagles went for two to try to tie it, but were not successful. Campbell fired back with his third touchdown pass, this one to Keenan McCardell, to make it 22–13. McNabb needed five plays to get the points back, launching a 45-yard touchdown pass to Reggie Brown for the touchdown. Ladell Betts fumbled the ball away in Eagle territory on Washington's next possession, but McNabb was sacked and fumbled it back to the Redskins on the next play. The Redskins eventually had first-and-goal from the three-yard line, but the Philadelphia defense had yet another huge goal-line stand, and Washington settled for a field goal to go up 25–20. The Eagles got the ball back with four minutes to play, and Westbrook immediately took a short pass and broke free for a 57-yard touchdown to go ahead 26–25 (the two-point conversion failing again). The defense came up big again, with Mike Patterson sacking Campbell to jar the ball loose, and Trent Cole recovering. Westbrook carried it in from ten yards out to seal the deal. McNabb, who surpassed Ron Jaworski for the most career completions in franchise history (2,090 at game's end), passed for 251 yards and four touchdowns in the 33–25 win. Westbrook rushed for 100 yards and had 83 receiving yards, with three total touchdowns. The comeback win improved the Eagles record to 4–5.

=== Week 11: vs. Miami Dolphins ===
Quarter	1	2	3	4	Total
Dolphins	0	7	0	0	7
Eagles	0	3	7	7	17

at Lincoln Financial Field, Philadelphia

- Game weather: 42 °F (6 °C), Cloudy
- Game attendance: 68,934
- TV announcers (CBS): Kevin Harlan (play-by-play) and Rich Gannon (color commentator)

After their big road win in Washington, the Eagles hosted the winless Miami Dolphins at muddy Lincoln Financial Field and won 17–7. The offenses struggled in the first quarter, and the first points would actually come via special teams in the second quarter, when Ted Ginn Jr. returned a punt 87 yards to paydirt for Miami. Later in the quarter, McNabb, who had already thrown two interceptions, was hit as he threw, spraining his ankle. David Akers came on to make a 34-yard field goal, and McNabb left the game. A. J. Feeley was spun up to play quarterback, but threw an interception of his own on his first drive. In the third quarter, Correll Buckhalter took the ball in from eight yards out for the go-ahead touchdown, making it 10–7. Feeley, after some helpful runs from running back Brian Westbrook, connected with receiver Jason Avant to increase the lead. The defense played a strong second half, and Westbrook carried seven times on the final drive, which killed the final 6:40 of the game. Without McNabb, Andy Reid leaned hard on Westbrook, who shattered his career-high with 32 carries, while picking up 148 yards. McNabb's post-game x-rays were negative. The win marked the first time Philadelphia had won consecutive games all season, as well as allowing them to reach .500 and remain in the playoff hunt in the NFC.

=== Week 12: at New England Patriots ===
Quarter	1	2	3	4	Total
Eagles	7	14	7	0	28
Patriots	14	10	0	7	31

at Gillette Stadium, Foxborough, Massachusetts

- Game weather: 42 °F (6 °C), Cloudy
- Game attendance: 68,756
- TV announcers (NBC): Al Michaels (play-by-play) and John Madden (color commentator)

In front of a national audience, the Eagles traveled to Foxboro as 24-point underdogs in their matchup against the 10–0 New England Patriots – the first meeting of the teams since Super Bowl XXXIX.

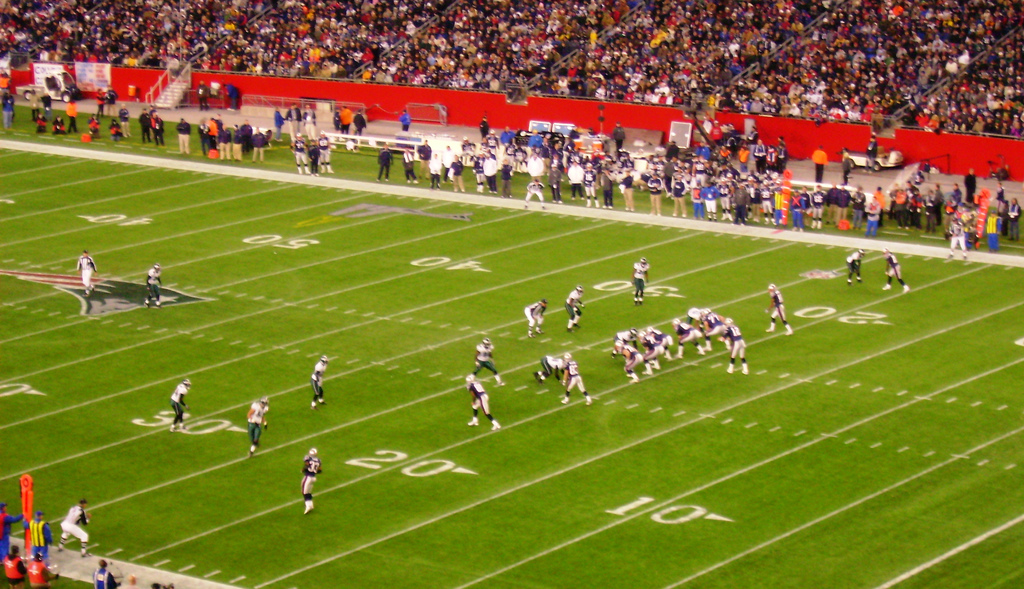
The Eagles visit the Patriots at Gillette Stadium, week 12

The Eagles started A. J. Feeley due to McNabb's injury, and Asante Samuel picked off a Feeley pass and returned it 40 yards for a touchdown on the third play of the game. The Eagles responded with a 14-play drive, capped by a one-yard diving touchdown by Brian Westbrook. Tom Brady finally got a chance late in the first quarter, and marched New England down the field before Heath Evans took it in from a yard out to make it 14–7 Patriots. However, Feeley answered back with a 28-yard touchdown to third receiver Greg Lewis. Andy Reid then tried an onside kick. Hank Baskett recovered the ball, but the Eagles were forced to punt. In a ten-play drive of all pass attempts, the Patriots had first-and-goal, but settled for a field goal to take a 17–14 lead. Feeley found Lewis again on the next series, this time an 18-yard strike with three minutes left in the half, giving Philadelphia the lead. Brady connected with Jabar Gaffney to retake the lead 24–21 with seconds left in the half.

A long drive by New England in the third quarter resulted in a missed field goal, and Feeley responded with a touchdown drive capped by an eight-yard reception in the end zone by Reggie Brown and the Eagles took a 28–24 lead as the game moved into the final quarter. Laurence Maroney scored from four yards out midway through the fourth as the Patriots went back on top 31–28. Feeley took the Eagles to within field goal range, but was picked off trying for a touchdown and the Patriots’ perfect season survived. Feeley had 345 passing yards and three touchdowns, but his three interceptions were costly. Westbrook had 92 all-purpose yards and a touchdown, while Greg Lewis racked up a surprising 88 receiving yards and two touchdowns. The loss drops the Eagles to 5–6. Interestingly though, it was only the Patriots' second close win of the season, the first being a 24–20 win against the Indianapolis Colts in Week 9.

=== Week 13: vs. Seattle Seahawks ===
Quarter	1	2	3	4	Total
Seahawks	14	7	7	0	28
Eagles	10	7	7	0	24

at Lincoln Financial Field, Philadelphia

- Game weather: 33 °F (1 °C), Light Rain
- Game attendance: 68,445
- TV announcers (Fox): Kenny Albert (play-by-play), Daryl Johnston (color commentator) and Tony Siragusa (sideline reporter)

The Eagles met the 7–4 Seattle Seahawks with A. J. Feeley at quarterback. Feeley was picked off by Lofa Tatupu on the first play leading to a two-yard touchdown carry for running back Shaun Alexander. On the Eagles' ensuing drive, Correll Buckhalter ran for a 30-yard touchdown run to tie the game. Tatupu caught his second interception on the Philadelphia's next possession and returned it to the Eagles' eight-yard line. Two plays later, Matt Hasselbeck completed a short touchdown pass to Bobby Engram. David Akers' field goal at the end of the first quarter made it 14–10, and Hasselbeck connected with Nate Burleson for a 43-yard score as Seattle went ahead 21–10. Kevin Curtis got open for a 24-yard touchdown reception to bring the Eagles within four points. With a minute left in the half, Philadelphia had first-and-goal from the one-yard line, but four straight plays failed to reach the end zone. A Bobby Engram fumble early in the second half gave Philadelphia the ball at the Seattle 40-yard line, and Brian Westbrook, who had been stopped three times at the one-yard line earlier, rushed to the left for a 29-yard touchdown and Philadelphia's only lead. Maurice Morris broke through on the left side for a 45-yard touchdown run and the Seahawks retook the lead 28–24 midway through the third quarter. The Eagles' Westbrook returned a punt 64 yards to the Seahawk 14-yard line, and Feeley tossed another interception to Tatupu. Feeley threw for one touchdown and four interceptions, giving him eight in two and a half games. Westbrook had 139 all-purpose yards and a score and Curtis caught six passes for 111 yards and a score of his own.

=== Week 14: vs. New York Giants ===
Quarter	1	2	3	4	Total
Giants	0	6	10	0	16
Eagles	7	0	3	3	13

at Lincoln Financial Field, Philadelphia

- Game weather: 36 °F (2 °C), Cloudy
- Game attendance: 68,594
- TV announcers (Fox): Kenny Albert (play-by-play), Daryl Johnston (color commentator) and Tony Siragusa (sideline reporter)

The Eagles lost 16–13 to the New York Giants. The Eagles, with Donovan McNabb back under center, scored on their opening drive with Brian Westbrook finding the end zone on an 18-yard pass from McNabb. The Giants scored an FG after having first-and-goal from the one-yard line. Another New York field goal just before halftime left the score 7–6. A fumble recovery gave Philadelphia the ball at the Giant eight-yard line, and David Akers kicked a short field goal. Later in the third quarter, Westbrook fumbled and Sam Madison recovered for New York. Eli Manning connected with Plaxico Burress for a 20-yard touchdown two plays later giving the Giants a 13–10 lead. A 41-yard pass to Burress set up another Lawrence Tynes field goal making it 16–10. Akers kicked a 39-yarder after a nearly eight-minute drive by the Eagles in the fourth quarter. On the Eagles' next drive, they crossed into Giant territory, but turned the ball over on downs. After a three-and-out, New York punter Jeff Feagles kicked the ball to the Eagles' 11-yard line with :51 to play and no timeouts. McNabb led the Eagles down the field, giving Akers a chance from 57 yards out. Akers hit the right upright and the FG was missed with 1 second remaining. Westbrook rushed for 116 and had a receiving touchdown, while Trent Cole had two sacks. Burress had 136 yards and one score. The home loss leaves the Eagles at 5–8.

=== Week 15: at Dallas Cowboys ===
Quarter	1	2	3	4	Total
Eagles	0	7	0	3	10
Cowboys	0	3	3	0	6

at Texas Stadium, Irving, Texas

- Game weather: 49 °F (9 °C), Clear
- Game attendance: 63,777
- TV announcers (Fox): Joe Buck (play-by-play) and Troy Aikman (color commentator)

The Eagles snapped a three-game skid and dealt the 12–1 Dallas Cowboys an upset loss with a big effort from the defense.

The defenses dominated the first quarter at Texas Stadium. Dallas got the first score in the second quarter on a field goal after Quintin Mikell fumbled away a Tony Romo pass he had just intercepted. But, Romo was picked off again on Dallas' next possession, this time by Lito Sheppard. Donovan McNabb and Brian Westbrook marched the Eagles to the one-yard line, where McNabb tossed a touchdown pass to Reggie Brown for a 7–3 Philadelphia lead with seconds left in the half.

On Dallas' second possession of the third quarter, Romo moved deep into Eagles' territory with two long passes to Patrick Crayton, but the Cowboys could only muster a field goal. A 13-play drive early in the fourth quarter led to short David Akers field goal and a 10–6 lead for the Eagles. Philadelphia had held second half leads over superior opponents for three straight weeks, but lost each game. This time, the defense shut down the Cowboys' efforts to score.

Brian Dawkins recorded Philadelphia's third interception midway through the final quarter. With the Eagles possessing the ball at the Cowboy 25-yard line, just over two minutes left, and Dallas out of timeouts, Westbrook broke through the defense and had a clear path to the end zone. Westbrook went down at the 1-yard line and allowed the Eagles to run out the clock instead of scoring the touchdown and kicking the ball off. McNabb passed for 208 yards and rushed for 53 more, while Westbrook had 81 rushing yards and 63 receiving yards. The defense used three sacks and three interceptions to help contain the Dallas offense. The victory kept the Eagles' mathematical hopes alive of gaining the final wild card spot, but they were eliminated Monday night when the Minnesota Vikings defeated the Chicago Bears.

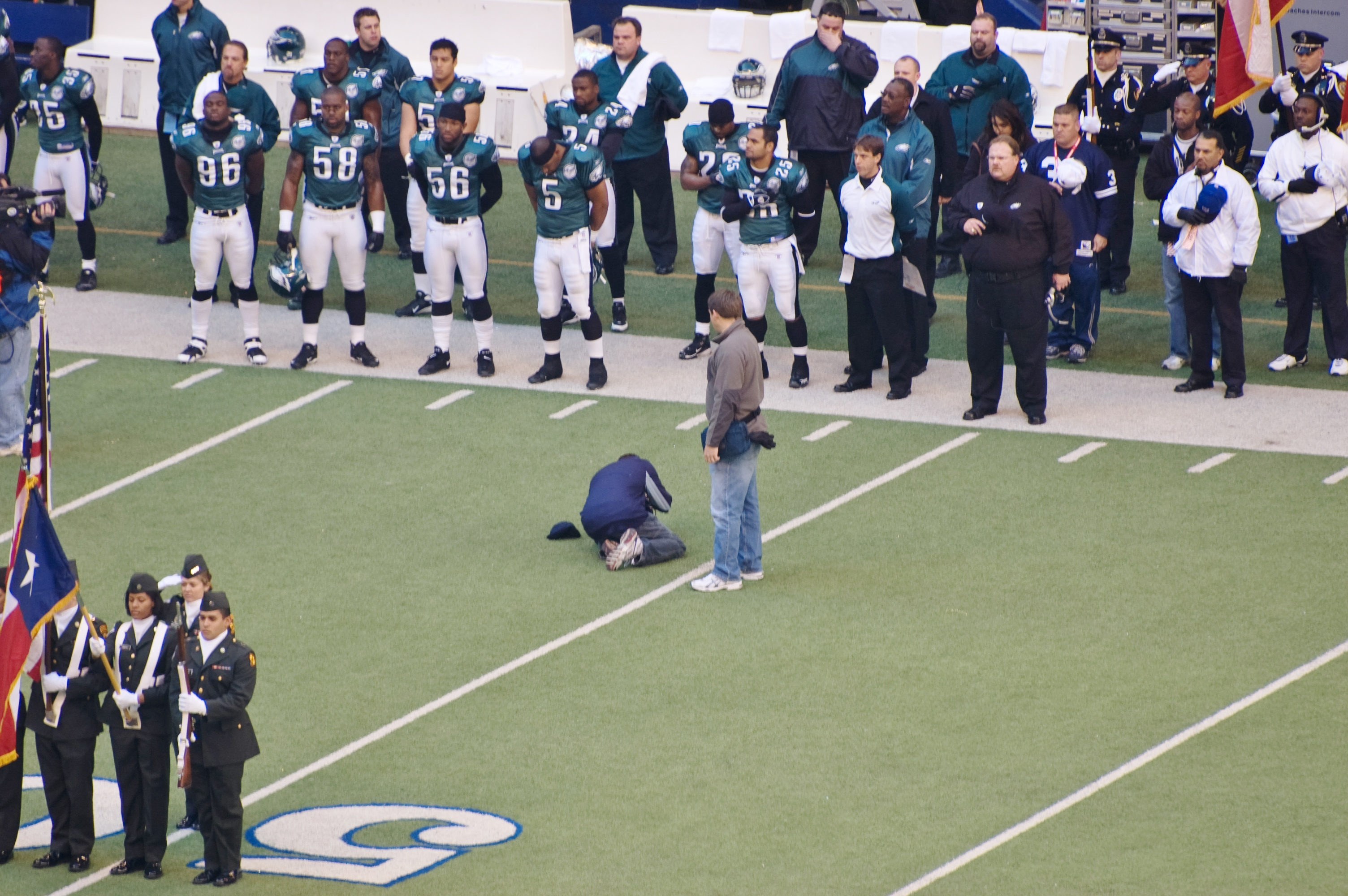
Pregame flag raising ceremony

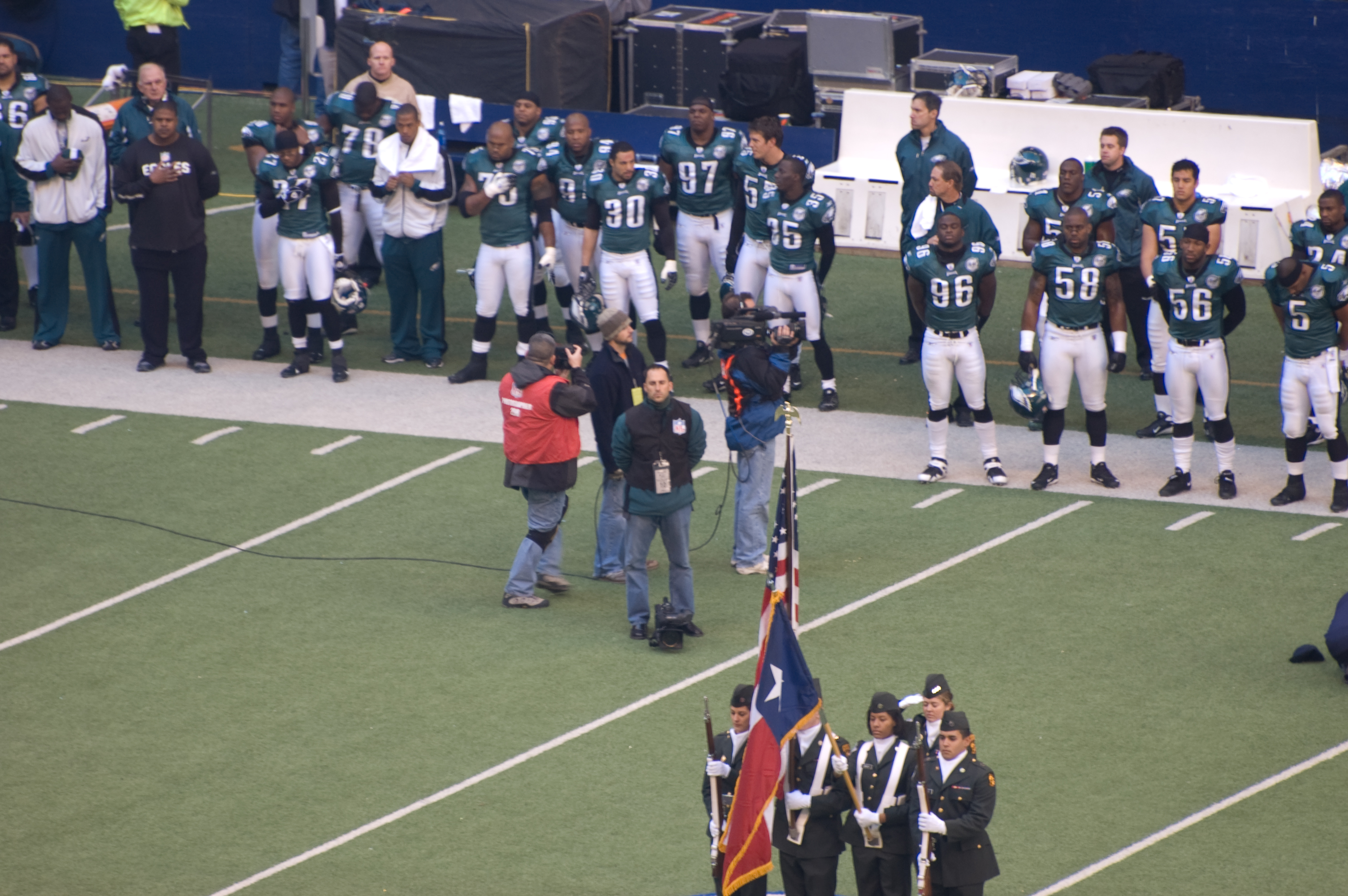
Pregame ceremony cont'd

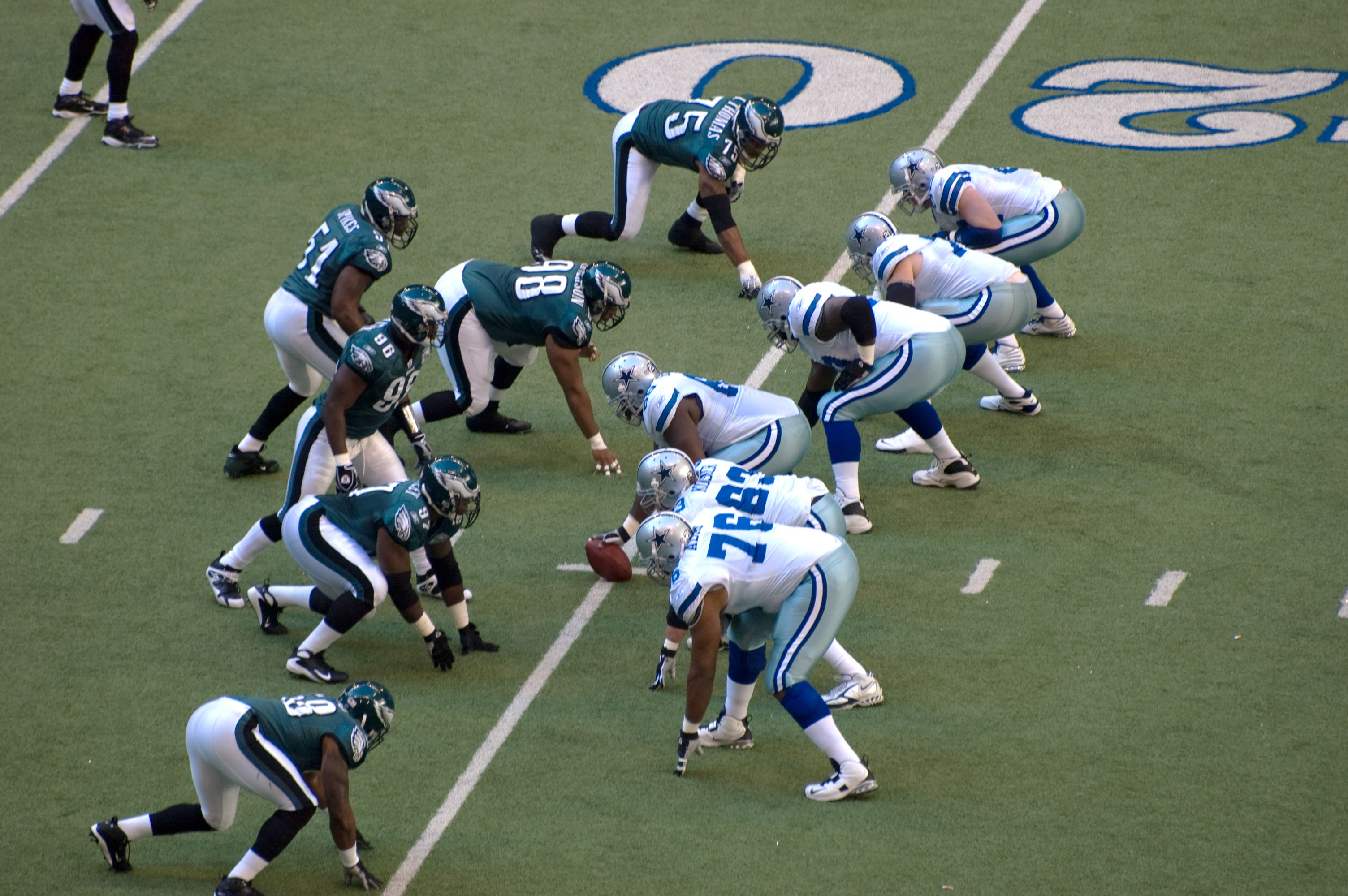
Game action with the Cowboys on offense

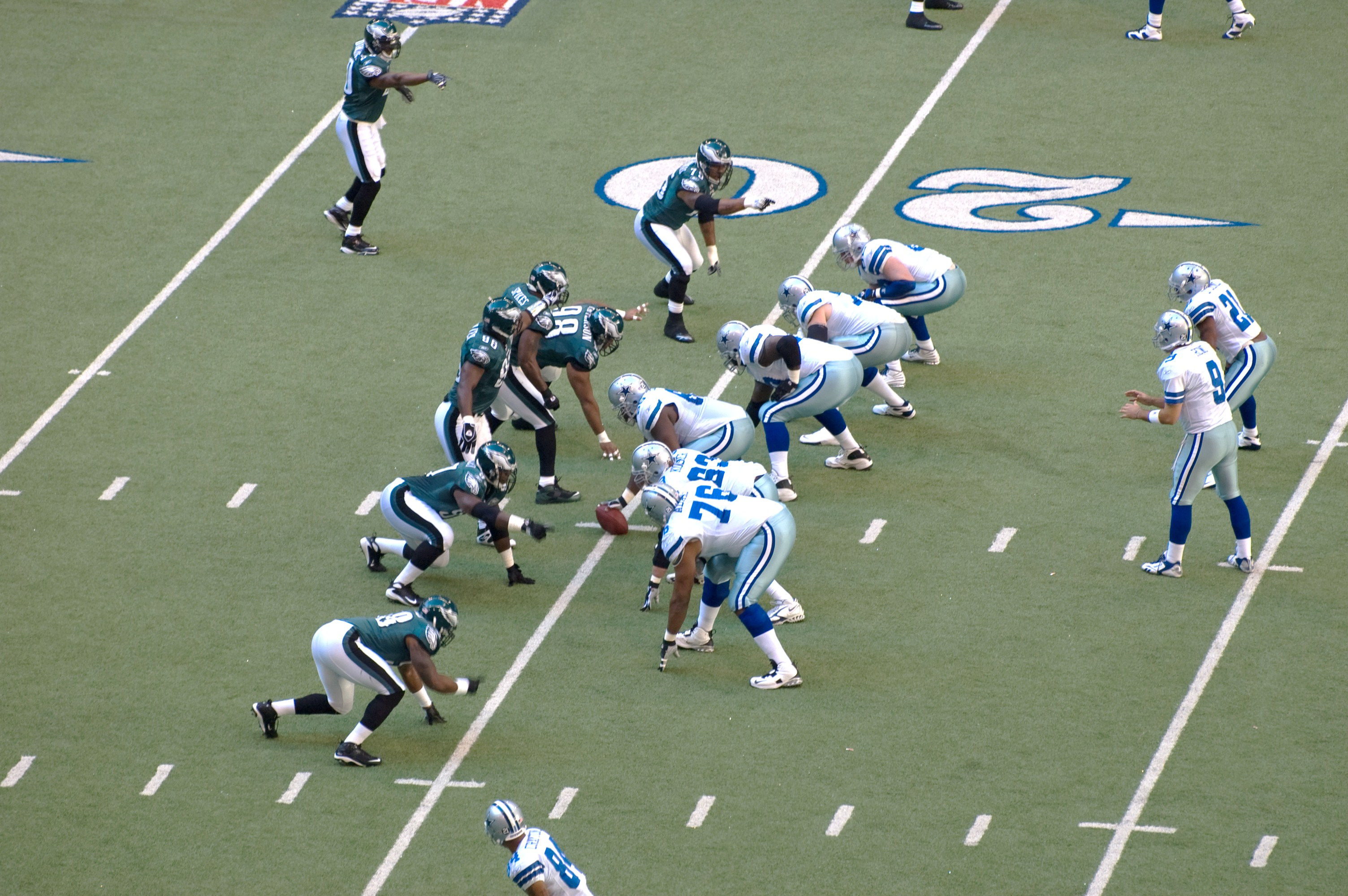
Tony Romo in the shotgun

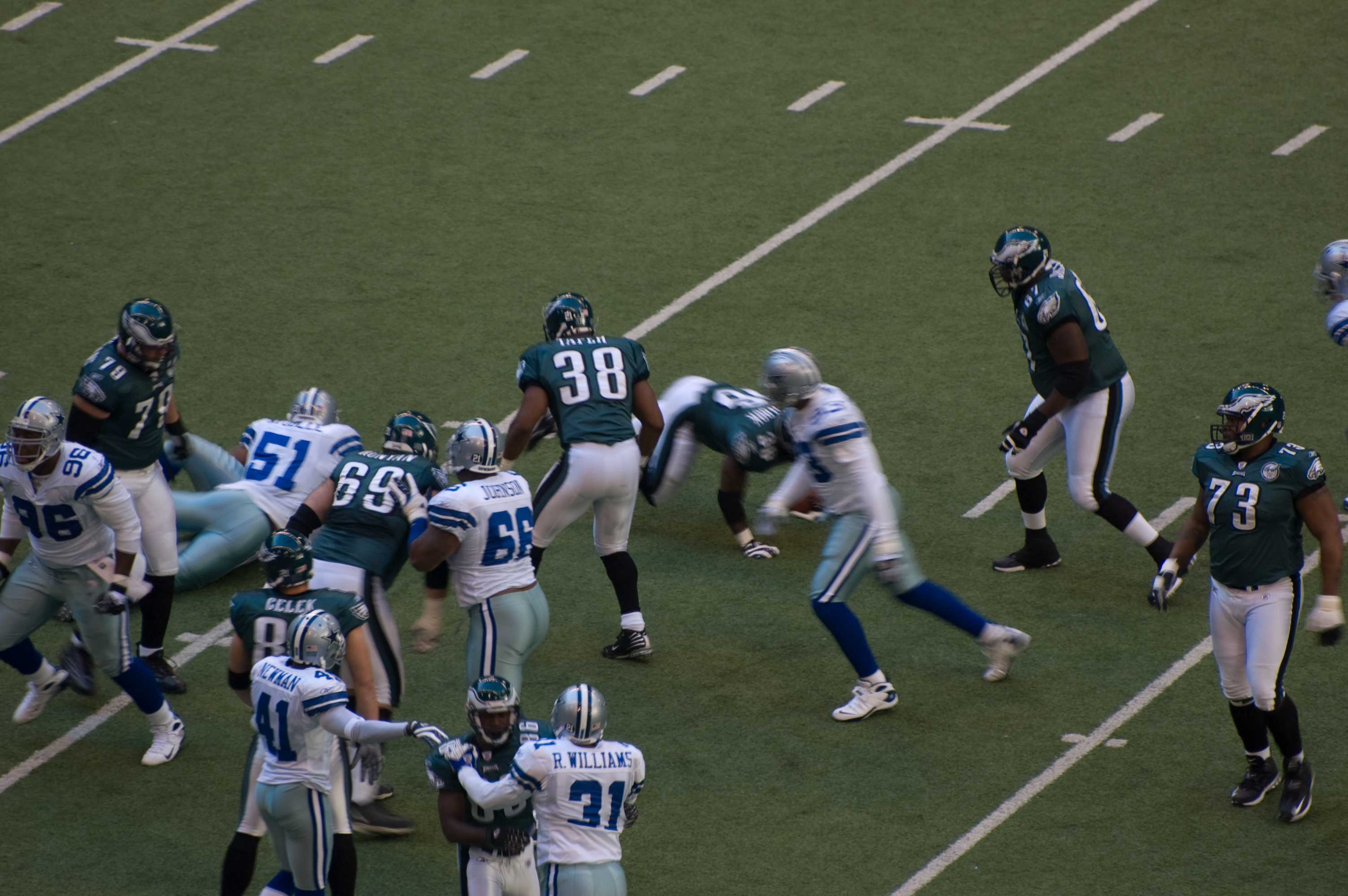
A Philadelphia offensive play

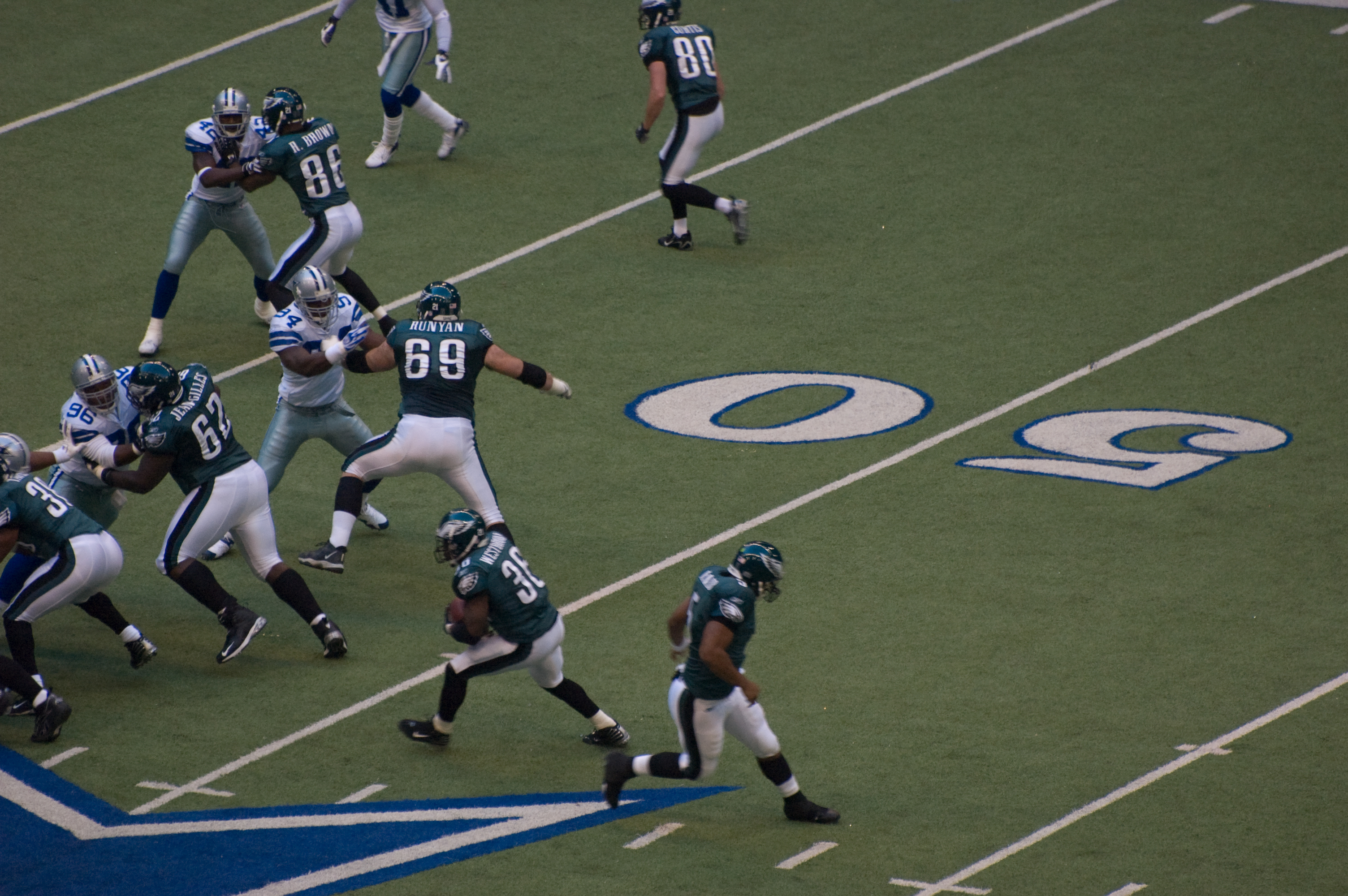
Donovan McNabb hands off to Brian Westbrook

=== Week 16: at New Orleans Saints ===
Quarter	1	2	3	4	Total
Eagles	21	3	7	7	38
Saints	14	3	0	6	23

at Louisiana Superdome, New Orleans

- Game attendance: 70,011
- TV announcers (Fox): Sam Rosen (play-by-play) and Tim Ryan (color commentator)

Now functioning as a spoiler, the Eagles traveled to face the New Orleans Saints at the Superdome – site of two losses in 2006, including one in the NFC Divisional Playoffs. The first quarter would be a shootout, with the teams combined for 5 touchdowns and over 300 yards of offense. On the third play from scrimmage, Donovan McNabb scrambled for a 40-yard gain, but fumbled, only to have the ball recovered in the end zone for a touchdown by receiver Kevin Curtis. A 52-yard bomb to wideout Devery Henderson keyed a four-play drive ending in a New Orleans touchdown by running back Aaron Stecker. McNabb's second fumble was recovered by New Orleans in Philadelphia territory, setting up another short touchdown for Stecker. The Eagles offense again moved the ball and Correll Buckhalter scored on a 20-yard scamper and the game was tied 14–14. On Philadelphia's next drive, McNabb found the open Reggie Brown for a 31-yard touchdown pass and a Philadelphia lead. In the second quarter, David Akers and Martin Gramatica traded field goals as the offenses settled down. The Saints had 2nd-and-goal from the 1-yard line on their opening drive of the second half, but the Eagles' defense stepped up with another big goal line stand and the seven-point lead was preserved. McNabb then led the Eagles on a 98-yard, seven-minute drive that ended in a 9-yard touchdown pass to Greg Lewis. The Saints answered with two field goals to get within eight at 31–23, but a McNabb to Curtis touchdown pass late in the fourth quarter wrapped things up for Philadelphia. McNabb looked mobile and was effective, throwing for three scores and 263 yards. Brian Westbrook had 100 rushing yards, while Curtis had 78 receiving yards, a touchdown reception, and a fumble recovery for a touchdown. The second straight win raised the Eagles' record to 7–8 and gave them a chance to finish .500 with a win over the Buffalo Bills.

=== Week 17: vs. Buffalo Bills ===
Quarter	1	2	3	4	Total
Bills	0	3	6	0	9
Eagles	7	3	7	0	17

at Lincoln Financial Field, Philadelphia

- Game weather: 42 °F (6 °C), Cloudy
- Game attendance: 68,594
- TV announcers (CBS): Kevin Harlan (play-by-play) and Rich Gannon (color commentator)

In their final game of the season, the Eagles posted a 17–9 victory over the Buffalo Bills in a contest of 7–8 teams trying to finish the year at .500. On Philadelphia's second possession, Donovan McNabb used a series of short passes to move the Eagles to a 1st-and-goal situation. On 3rd-and-goal, McNabb hit rookie tight end Brent Celek for a touchdown. McNabb took the Eagles inside the Buffalo red zone again on the next drive, but he was intercepted and Buffalo's offense countered with a long drive ending in a Rian Lindell field goal in the second quarter. Behind McNabb's arm, the Eagles conducted a two-minute drill and came away with a 38-yard David Akers field goal to make the halftime score 10–3. After Buffalo kicked another field goal in the third quarter, McNabb took the Eagles into Bills territory and completed a pass to Reggie Brown, who fumbled before he got to the end zone. Kevin Curtis was there to recover the fumble for a touchdown – for the second week in a row. Philadelphia went on top 17–6, but a 56-yard run by Marshawn Lynch helped the Bills to another field goal, putting them within eight with more than a quarter to play. A botched shotgun by center Jamaal Jackson was recovered by the Bills at the Eagle 28-yard line, but on 3rd and 1 and 4th and 1, the Eagles' defense stuffed Marshawn Lynch, ending the Bills' scoring threat. That would turn out to be Buffalo's last opportunity, as the Eagles offense and defense ground out the clock over the final quarter. McNabb threw for 345 yards and a touchdown. Brian Westbrook had 99-all purpose yards and Reggie Brown had 83 receiving yards. The win at home allowed the Eagles to finish at 8–8, and finish in last place in the competitive NFC East for the 2007 NFL season.
