= Mike McGlynn =

American football player (born 1985)

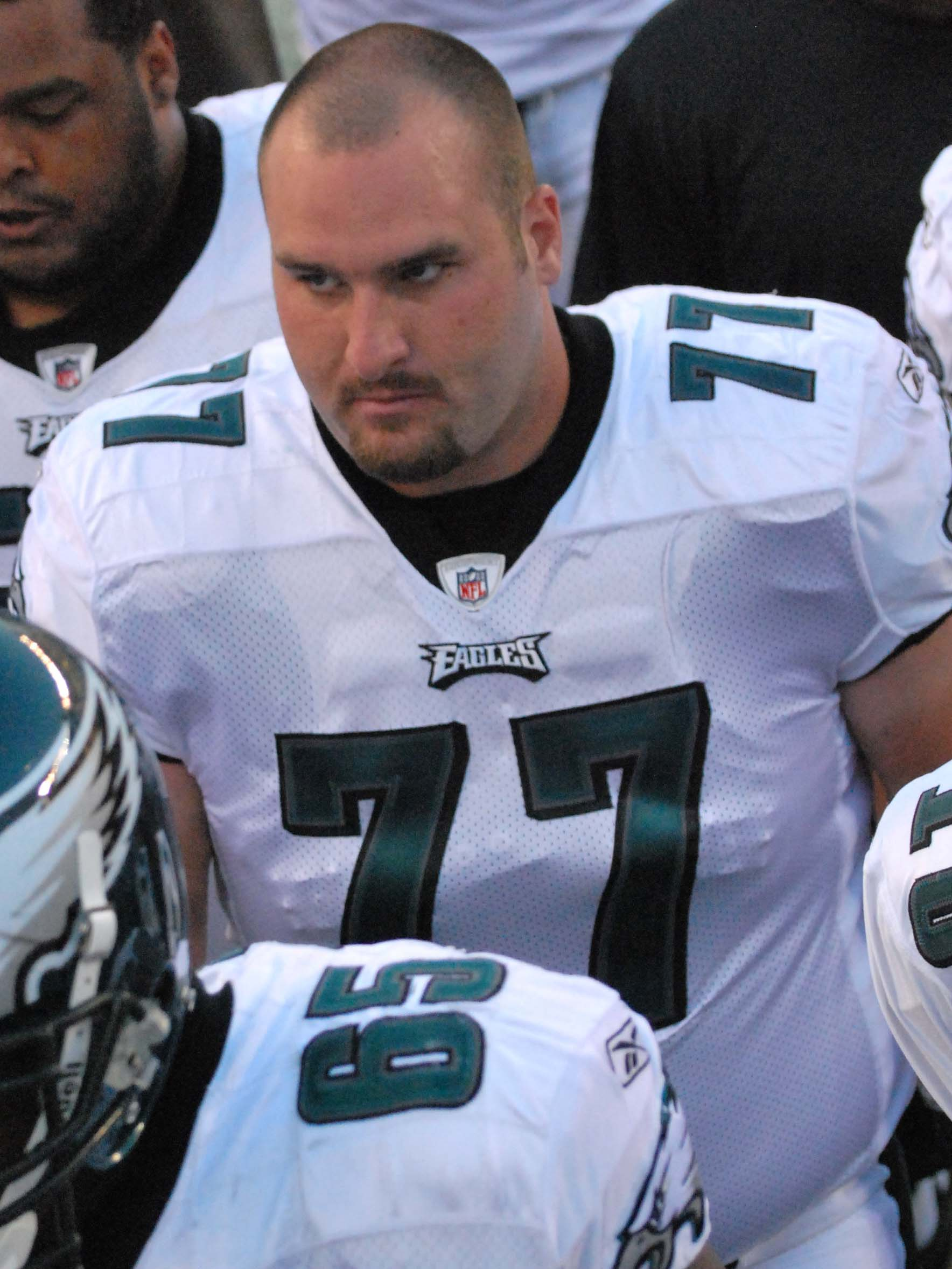
- McGlynn with the Philadelphia Eagles in 2008

No. 77, 66, 75
- Position: Guard

Personal information
- Born: March 8, 1985 (age 41); Austintown, Ohio, U.S.
- Listed height: 6 ft 5 in (1.96 m)
- Listed weight: 309 lb (140 kg)

Career information
- High school: Austintown-Fitch
- College: Pittsburgh
- NFL draft: 2008: 4th round, 109th overall pick

Career history
- Philadelphia Eagles (2008–2010); Cincinnati Bengals (2011); Indianapolis Colts (2012–2013); Washington Redskins (2014)*; Kansas City Chiefs (2014); New Orleans Saints (2015)
- * Offseason or practice squad member only

Career NFL statistics
- Games played: 83
- Games started: 61
- Stats at Pro Football Reference

Michael Ryan McGlynn (born March 8, 1985) is an American former professional football player who was a guard in the National Football League (NFL). He was selected by the Philadelphia Eagles in the fourth round of the 2008 NFL draft. He played college football for the Pittsburgh Panthers.

McGlynn has also played for the Cincinnati Bengals, Indianapolis Colts, Kansas City Chiefs, and New Orleans Saints.

== Early life ==
McGlynn played high school football at Austintown-Fitch High School in Austintown, Ohio.

== College career ==
McGlynn started from 2004 to 2007 at right offensive tackle for the Pittsburgh Panthers.

== Professional career ==
=== Philadelphia Eagles ===
McGlynn was selected by the Philadelphia Eagles in the fourth round (109th overall) of the 2008 NFL draft. He signed a four-year contract with the team on June 4, 2008.

During the 2008 season, McGlynn was the backup left guard to Todd Herremans, and later Nick Cole. He was placed on injured reserve on January 7, 2009, due to a torn hamstring suffered in a Wild Card Playoff game against the Minnesota Vikings.

McGlynn was inactive for every game of the 2009 season. After Jamaal Jackson suffered a torn anterior cruciate ligament in week 16 against the Denver Broncos, McGlynn was the backup center behind Nick Cole for the rest of the season.

McGlynn became the starting center for the Eagles after Jackson suffered a torn triceps tendon before the start of the 2010 NFL season. He caught the first pass of his NFL career off a deflection on September 12, 2010. It came from Kevin Kolb and went for one yard.

McGlynn was released on September 3, 2011, during final roster cuts.

=== Cincinnati Bengals ===
On September 4, McGlynn was claimed off waivers by the Cincinnati Bengals. He played in seven games in 2011, starting four.

=== Indianapolis Colts ===
McGlynn was signed by the Indianapolis Colts on March 15, 2012.

=== Washington Redskins ===
McGlynn was signed by the Washington Redskins on March 28, 2014. The Redskins released McGlynn on August 26, 2014.

=== Kansas City Chiefs ===
McGlynn signed with the Kansas City Chiefs on August 27, 2014. He started 13 games for the Chiefs in 2014, and was Pro Football Focus's worst ranked guard on the year, one of the main reasons Kansas City had one of the worst offensive lines in football that season.

=== New Orleans Saints ===
McGlynn signed with New Orleans Saints on May 20, 2015. On September 12, 2015, McGlynn was released. He was re-signed on September 14.
