= Juqua Parker =

American football player (born 1978)

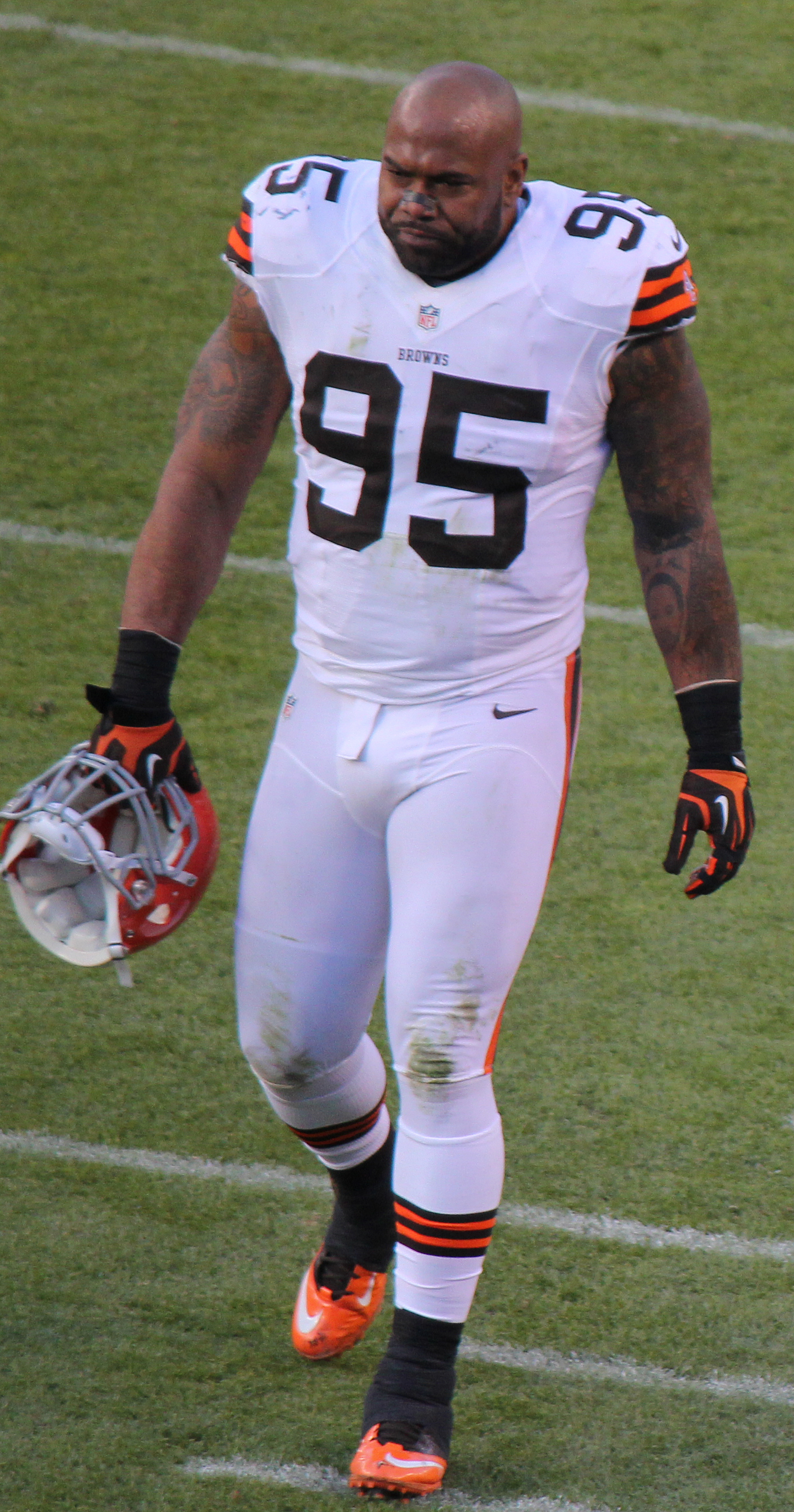
- Parker in 2012

No. 94, 75, 95
- Position: Defensive end

Personal information
- Born: May 15, 1978 (age 48); Houston, Texas, U.S.
- Listed height: 6 ft 2 in (1.88 m)
- Listed weight: 250 lb (113 kg)

Career information
- High school: Aldine (Houston)
- College: Oklahoma State
- NFL draft: 2001: undrafted

Career history
- Tennessee Titans (2001−2004); Philadelphia Eagles (2005−2011); Cleveland Browns (2012)

Career NFL statistics
- Total Tackles: 266
- Sacks: 42.5
- Forced fumbles: 11
- Fumble recoveries: 8
- Interceptions: 1
- Defensive Touchdowns: 3
- Stats at Pro Football Reference

Juqua Demail Parker (/dʒəˈkweɪ/ jə-KWAY; né Thomas; born May 15, 1978) is an American former professional football player who was a defensive end in the National Football League (NFL). He was signed by the Tennessee Titans as an undrafted free agent in 2001. He played college football for the Oklahoma State Cowboys and high school football at Aldine High School in Houston, Texas.

Parker has also played for the Philadelphia Eagles and Cleveland Browns.

== College career ==
Parker originally attended Northeastern Oklahoma A&M College where he posted 29 sacks in two seasons and was named Southwestern Junior College Conference Player of the Year. He then transferred to Oklahoma State, earning third-team All-Big 12 Conference honors and playing in the East-West Shrine Game his senior year after posting 57 tackles, five PBUs, and a team-leading 21 TFLs & 9.5 sacks.

== Professional career ==
=== Tennessee Titans ===
Parker signed with the Tennessee Titans as a rookie free agent in 2001 and spent four years as a backup.

=== Philadelphia Eagles ===
Parker was signed by the Philadelphia Eagles in 2005 to serve a similar role, and he recorded six sacks in 2006 following an injury to starter Jevon Kearse. In 2007, Parker signed a long-term contract to remain with the team. Midway through the 2007 season he was elevated to the starting lineup to replace an ineffective Kearse and was the team's starting left defensive end. He made a career-high eight sacks in 2008. Parker lost his starting job to 2010 first-round draft pick Brandon Graham midway through the 2010 preseason, however, in the first three games of the season, Parker, in his limited playing time, recorded four sacks. In 2011, in week 1 against the St. Louis Rams, Parker had a fumble off of Rams quarterback Sam Bradford and returned for a touchdown. In week 15 against the New York Jets, Parker had another fumble returned for a touchdown after Eagles free safety Kurt Coleman stripped the ball from Jets wide receiver Santonio Holmes.

=== Cleveland Browns ===
Parker signed with the Cleveland Browns on March 15, 2012.

== NFL career statistics ==
Legend
	Led the league
**Bold**	Career high

=== Regular season ===
Year	Team	Games		Tackles					Interceptions					Fumbles			
Year	Team	GP	GS	Cmb	Solo	Ast	Sck	TFL	Int	Yds	TD	Lng	PD	FF	FR	Yds	TD
2001	TEN	7	0	5	4	1	0.0	1	0	0	0	0	0	0	0	0	0
2002	TEN	9	0	13	11	2	1.0	5	0	0	0	0	0	0	0	0	0
2003	TEN	15	0	17	13	4	4.0	5	0	0	0	0	0	1	0	0	0
2004	TEN	10	0	7	6	1	0.0	0	0	0	0	0	0	1	1	0	0
2005	PHI	**16**	1	24	19	5	0.0	2	0	0	0	0	2	0	1	16	0
2006	PHI	**16**	1	26	19	7	6.0	5	0	0	0	0	4	1	0	0	0
2007	PHI	**16**	7	39	29	10	5.0	5	0	0	0	0	2	**2**	**2**	0	0
2008	PHI	**16**	**16**	**45**	**33**	**12**	5.0	6	**1**	**55**	**1**	**55**	**7**	1	0	0	0
2009	PHI	**16**	11	34	30	4	**8.0**	**10**	0	0	0	0	4	**2**	0	0	0
2010	PHI	13	10	22	19	3	6.0	8	0	0	0	0	2	1	1	0	0
2011	PHI	12	0	10	9	1	1.5	2	0	0	0	0	5	0	**2**	**103**	**2**
2012	CLE	**16**	0	24	18	6	6.0	9	0	0	0	0	0	**2**	1	0	0
		162	46	266	210	56	42.5	58	1	55	1	55	26	11	8	119	2

=== Playoffs ===
Year	Team	Games		Tackles					Interceptions					Fumbles			
Year	Team	GP	GS	Cmb	Solo	Ast	Sck	TFL	Int	Yds	TD	Lng	PD	FF	FR	Yds	TD
2003	TEN	2	0	1	1	0	0.0	0	0	0	0	0	0	0	0	0	0
2006	PHI	2	0	5	4	1	**1.5**	**1**	0	0	0	0	0	0	0	0	0
2008	PHI	**3**	**3**	**6**	4	**2**	0.0	0	0	0	0	0	0	0	**1**	0	0
2009	PHI	1	1	2	2	0	0.0	**1**	0	0	0	0	0	0	0	0	0
2010	PHI	1	1	**6**	**5**	1	0.0	**1**	0	0	0	0	0	0	**1**	0	0
		9	5	20	16	4	1.5	3	0	0	0	0	0	0	2	0	0

== Personal life ==
=== Name change ===
On March 12, 2008, it was revealed that Juqua's last name had legally been changed from Thomas to Parker at the request of his father, who died in 2005.

=== Arrest ===
On August 5, 2009, Parker was taken into custody during a traffic stop around 12:30 a.m. on N. Mountain Drive at Route 378 in Lower Saucon Township, Pennsylvania, which is near the Eagles' training camp at Lehigh University in Bethlehem, Pennsylvania. Lower Saucon Township police said Parker was a passenger in a vehicle, driven by Eagles' teammate Todd Herremans, which was stopped for a traffic violation, and he had a small amount of marijuana in his possession. Parker, of Medford, New Jersey, was arraigned in the Central Booking Center and released from Northampton County Prison under $1,000 bail.

The charges were dropped after the district attorney ruled that the arresting officer had no right to search the car.
