= Hank Fraley =

American football player and coach (born 1977)

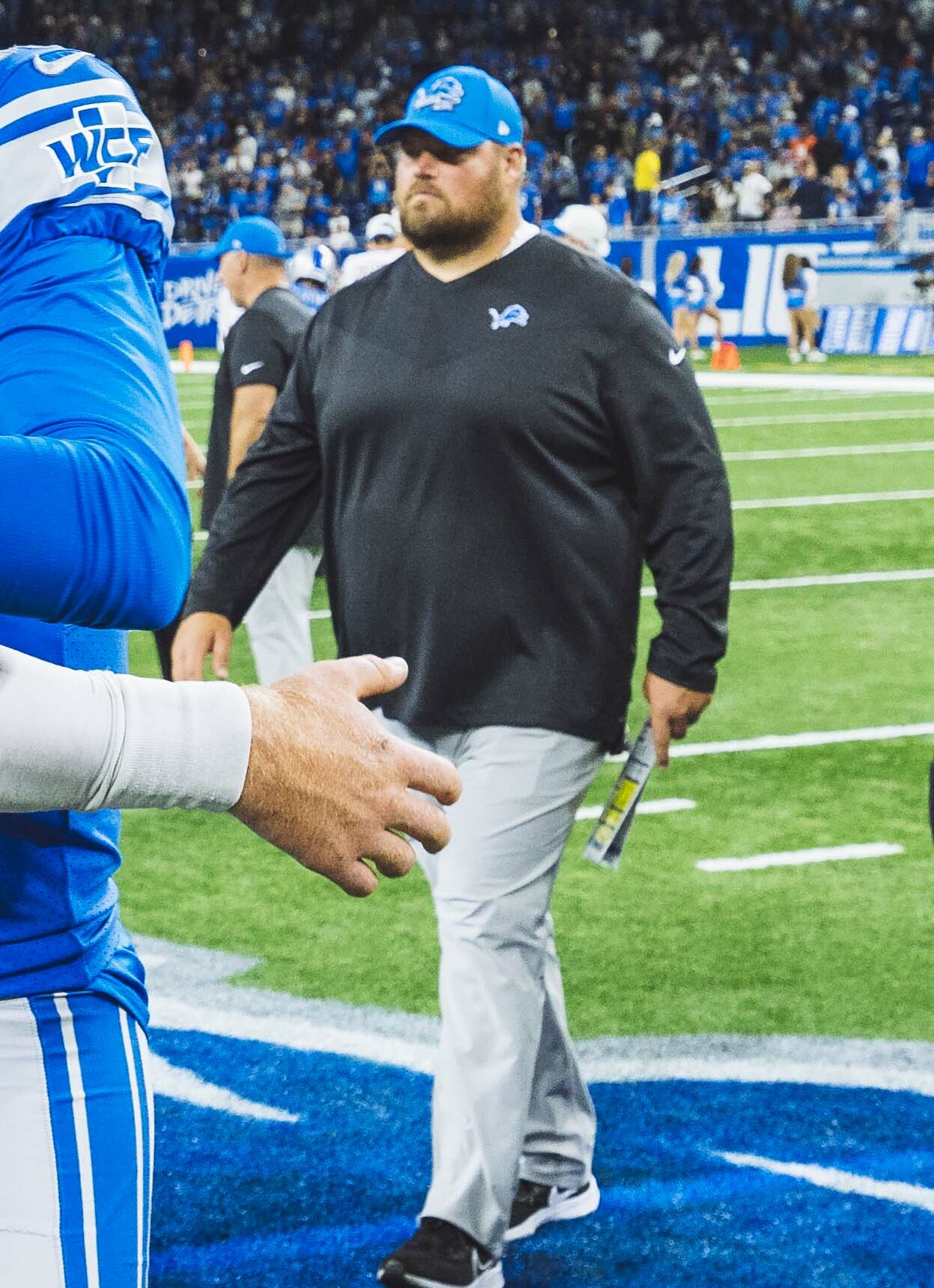
- Fraley with the Lions in 2022

Detroit Lions
- Title: Offensive line coach/run game coordinator

Personal information
- Born: September 21, 1977 (age 49); Gaithersburg, Maryland, U.S.
- Listed height: 6 ft 3 in (1.91 m)
- Listed weight: 310 lb (141 kg)

Career information
- Position: Center (No. 63, 66, 65)
- High school: Gaithersburg
- College: Robert Morris (1996–1999)
- NFL draft: 2000: undrafted

Career history

Playing
- Pittsburgh Steelers (2000)*; Philadelphia Eagles (2000–2005); Cleveland Browns (2006–2009); St. Louis Rams (2010)
- * Offseason or practice squad member only

Coaching
- San Diego (2012) Offensive line coach; San Jose State (2013) Offensive line coach; Minnesota Vikings (2014–2016) Assistant offensive line coach; UCLA (2017) Offensive line coach; Detroit Lions (2018–present); Assistant offensive line coach (2018-2019); Offensive line coach (2020-2024); Offensive line coach/run game coordinator (2025-present)

Career NFL statistics
- Games played: 142
- Games started: 123
- Stats at Pro Football Reference

Henry Franklin Fraley Jr. (born September 21, 1977) is an American football coach and former center who is the offensive line coach and run game coordinator for the Detroit Lions of the National Football League (NFL). He previously served as an assistant offensive line coach for the Lions and Minnesota Vikings. Originally from Gaithersburg, Maryland, Fraley played college football at Robert Morris University and was signed as an undrafted free agent in 2000 by the Pittsburgh Steelers. Waived before the start of the 2000 season, Fraley was claimed off waivers by the Philadelphia Eagles, for whom he started at center for five seasons. He lost his starting job to Jamaal Jackson before the 2006 season and was subsequently traded to the Cleveland Browns. He played for the Browns for four seasons and the St. Louis Rams for one season.

== Early life ==
Fraley attended Gaithersburg High School and as a senior in 1995, he helped them to the Maryland state championship game.

== Playing career ==
=== College ===
Fraley's career began as a non-scholarship player at Division I-AA Robert Morris University near Pittsburgh. He is listed as the second athlete to ever have his number, 75, retired from Robert Morris University. Fraley holds a degree in Organizational Leadership.

=== National Football League ===
==== Pittsburgh Steelers ====
Fraley was signed as an undrafted free agent by the Pittsburgh Steelers in 2000.

==== Philadelphia Eagles ====
Fraley was claimed off waivers in 2000 by the Philadelphia Eagles after being released by the Steelers. He was inactive for the entire 2000 season. In his first ever NFL game (vs St. Louis Rams on September 9, 2001), Fraley was fined for an illegal downfield block. He started in 15 games in 2001.

Fraley started in all 16 regular season games along with two postseason games during the 2002 season. He was part of an offensive line that helped the Eagles offense to 25.9 points per game, the fourth highest in the NFL.

Fraley started in all 16 regular season games in 2003 and 2004. In 2004, he was an important part of the offensive line that helped the Eagles to 4,208 passing yards, a team record and 386 points, the third most in team history.

He started the first eight games of the 2005 season, but suffered a shoulder injury at the Washington Redskins on November 6 which ruled him out for the rest of the season.

==== Cleveland Browns ====
On September 2, 2006, Fraley was traded to the Cleveland Browns in exchange for a draft pick in the 2008 NFL draft after losing his starting job to Jamaal Jackson. He made his Browns debut versus the New Orleans Saints on September 10 and started in all 16 games.

It was said by teammate wide receiver Joe Jurevicius that Fraley should have been considered the offensive MVP in the 2006 season, due to his line calling and blue-collar work ethic.

Prior to the start of free agency in 2007, the Browns re-signed Fraley to a four-year contract for an undisclosed amount. He made his 100th NFL career start versus the Buffalo Bills on December 16.

He was released by the Browns on March 3, 2010.

==== St. Louis Rams ====
On March 14, 2010, Fraley signed with the St. Louis Rams. He was released on September 4, 2011, after just one season with the Rams.

== Coaching career ==
=== University of San Diego ===
On April 7, 2012, Fraley was hired by the University of San Diego as the football team's offensive line coach.

=== San Jose State University ===
On January 31, 2013, San Jose State University hired Fraley as offensive line coach for the Spartans football team under Ron Caragher.

=== Minnesota Vikings ===
On February 10, 2014, Fraley was hired by the Minnesota Vikings as an assistant offensive line coach.

=== UCLA ===
On January 21, 2017, the UCLA Bruins hired Fraley as their offensive line coach.

=== Detroit Lions ===
On February 16, 2018, Fraley was hired by the Detroit Lions as an assistant offensive line coach.

On January 7, 2020, Fraley was promoted to offensive line coach.

== Personal life ==
Hank grew up in Gaithersburg Maryland attending Gaithersburg High School. Prior to starting his NFL career, Fraley planned on teaching history and coaching football. He is married to Danielle (May 26, 2006), and they live in Canton, Michigan with their five children. They have one yellow lab named Wingman, a Leonberger named Uschi, a pug named Daisy, and a Chocolate Lab named Bently.
