= Max Jean-Gilles =

American football player (born 1983)

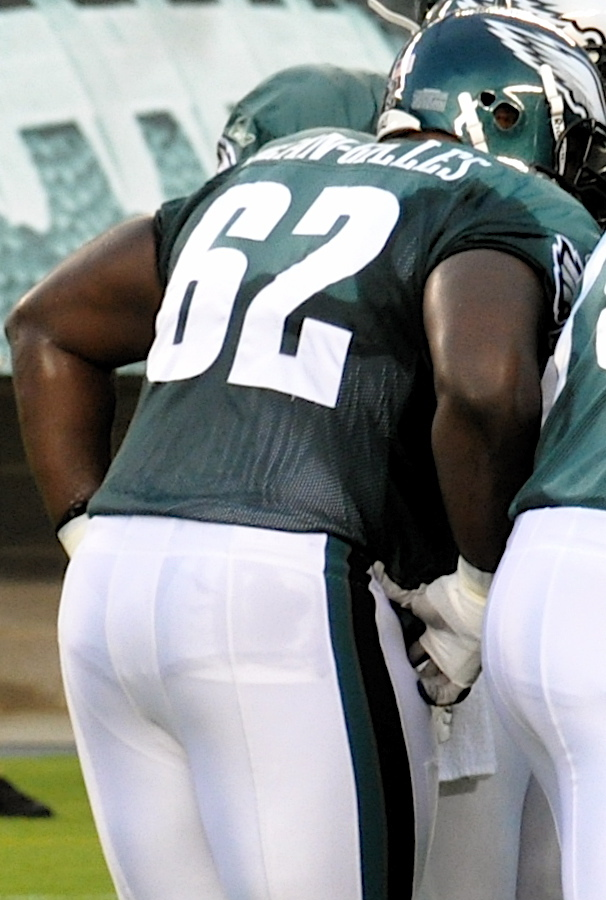
- Jean-Gilles with the Philadelphia Eagles in 2009

No. 62
- Position: Guard

Personal information
- Born: November 19, 1983 (age 42); Miami, Florida, U.S.
- Listed height: 6 ft 4 in (1.93 m)
- Listed weight: 358 lb (162 kg)

Career information
- High school: North Miami Beach (North Miami Beach, Florida)
- College: Georgia
- NFL draft: 2006: 4th round, 99th overall pick

Career history
- Philadelphia Eagles (2006–2010); Cincinnati Bengals (2011)*; Carolina Panthers (2011)*; Lincoln Haymakers (2014)*; Portland Thunder (2014–2015)
- * Offseason or practice squad member only

Awards and highlights
- Consensus All-American (2005); Second-team All-American (2004); 2× First-team All-SEC (2004, 2005); Second-team All-SEC (2003)

Career NFL statistics
- Games played: 42
- Games started: 26
- Stats at Pro Football Reference

Career AFL statistics
- Total tackles: 2
- Stats at ArenaFan.com

Max Jean-Gilles (born November 19, 1983) is an American former professional football player who was a guard in the National Football League (NFL). He played college football for the Georgia Bulldogs, earning consensus All-American honors in 2005. He was selected by the Philadelphia Eagles in the fourth round of the 2006 NFL draft.

== Early life ==
Jean-Gilles attended North Miami Beach High School in North Miami Beach, Florida and was a letterman in high school football. In football, he was a two-time first-team all-state selection and a two-time first-team all-county selection.

== College career ==
Jean-Gilles attended the University of Georgia, where he played for coach Mark Richt's Georgia Bulldogs football team from 2002 to 2005. Following his senior season in 2005, he was a first-team All-Southeastern Conference (SEC) selection and was recognized as a consensus first-team All-American. He was a key starter of the Bulldogs team that defeated the LSU Tigers by a score of 34–14 to win the 2005 SEC Championship Game.

== Professional career ==
Pre-draft measurables
Height	Weight	Arm length	Hand span	40-yard dash	10-yard split	20-yard split	20-yard shuttle	Three-cone drill	Vertical jump	Broad jump	Bench press
6 ft 3 3/4 in (1.92 m)	355 lb (161 kg)	34 1/2 in (0.88 m)	9 1/2 in (0.24 m)	5.48 s	1.88 s	3.16 s	5.08 s	8.56 s	24.5 in (0.62 m)	7 ft 11 in (2.41 m)	31 reps
All values from NFL Combine/Pro Day

=== Philadelphia Eagles ===
Jean-Gilles was chosen in the fourth round of the 2006 NFL draft with the 99th overall pick by the Philadelphia Eagles. Many people did expect him to go higher because of his athleticism and playing ability, but his inability to control his weight might have played into that decision. He and offensive tackle Winston Justice, who was selected in the second round also by the Eagles, were supposed to have helped with the rebuilding process of the offensive line. On July 10, 2006, Jean-Gilles signed a four-year contract with the Eagles.

On September 23, 2007, Jean-Gilles made his regular season debut for the Eagles, subbing in for an injured Shawn Andrews.

Jean-Gilles' 2008 season was cut short on Thanksgiving night against the Arizona Cardinals when he fractured his ankle and was placed on injured reserve.

During the 2009 season, after a knee injury to starting center Jamaal Jackson in Week 16 against the Denver Broncos, starting right guard Nick Cole shifted over to center, while Jean-Gilles came in at right guard for the rest of the game. With Jackson out for the year with a torn anterior cruciate ligament (ACL), Jean-Gilles would continue to start at right guard for the rest of the year.

He was re-signed to a one-year contract on April 15, 2010. Due to the Eagles not making the roster deadline during final cuts because of a trade, Jean-Gilles had to be released in order to meet the roster requirement on September 4. He was re-signed on September 5.

=== Cincinnati Bengals ===
On August 2, 2011, Jean-Gilles signed a one-year contract with the Cincinnati Bengals, but was released on September 3.

=== Carolina Panthers ===
Jean-Gilles signed with the Carolina Panthers on September 4, 2011, but was released on September 11.

=== Lincoln Haymakers ===
Jean-Gilles signed with the Lincoln Haymakers of the Champions Professional Indoor Football League on August 27, 2013.

=== Portland Thunder ===
Jean-Gilles was assigned to the Portland Thunder of the Arena Football League on October 9, 2013. On August 7, 2015, the Thunder voided his assignment.

== Personal life ==
Jean-Gilles' parents immigrated to the United States from Haiti in the early 1980s. He has a son, Marcus. Jean-Gilles underwent lap-band surgery in May 2010 in order to lose weight. It was reported that he weighed about 400 pounds (180 kg) during the offseason. He had hoped to get down to about 335 pounds (152 kg) by the start of the 2010 season. Jean-Gilles is the first active NFL player to undergo lap-band surgery.
