= James Urban =

American football player and coach (born 1973)

Penn State Nittany Lions
- Title: Senior offensive Analyst

Personal information
- Born: December 1, 1973 (age 52); Mechanicsburg, Pennsylvania

Career information
- College: Washington and Lee

Career history
- Clarion (1997–1998) Graduate assistant; Pennsylvania (1999) Director of football administration; Pennsylvania (2000–2003) Director of football operations; Philadelphia Eagles (2004–2006) Assistant to head coach; Philadelphia Eagles (2007–2008) Offensive assistant & quality control coach; Philadelphia Eagles (2009–2010) Quarterbacks coach; Cincinnati Bengals (2011–2017) Wide receivers coach; Baltimore Ravens (2018–2022) Quarterbacks coach; Baltimore Ravens (2023) Senior football analyst/game planning; Penn State (2024) Offensive analyst/analytics coordinator; Penn State (2025-present) Senior offensive analyst

James Urban (born December 1, 1973) is an American football coach who was the quarterbacks coach for the Baltimore Ravens of the National Football League (NFL). He previously served as an assistant coach for the Cincinnati Bengals and Philadelphia Eagles.

== Playing career ==
Urban played college football at Washington and Lee. He played wide receiver and kick returner for the Generals.

== Coaching career ==
=== College ===
From 1997–1998, Urban was a graduate assistant at Clarion University of Pennsylvania. He was the director of football administration at the University of Pennsylvania in 1999, and was the director of football operations from 2000–2003.

=== Professional ===
==== Philadelphia Eagles ====
Urban became a coaching intern for the Philadelphia Eagles during training camp in 2003. The assistant to head coach Andy Reid tore a patellar tendon during camp, and Urban took over his duties while he recovered. He was promoted to that position full-time in 2004. He was promoted to offensive assistant/quality control coach on February 20, 2007. He was promoted to quarterbacks coach in 2009 after Pat Shurmur left to be the offensive coordinator of the St. Louis Rams. When the Eagles signed Michael Vick during the preseason in 2009, Urban and offensive quality control coach Doug Pederson helped acclimate Vick to the offensive scheme. Urban was promoted to assistant offensive coordinator on February 8, 2011.

==== Cincinnati Bengals ====
Shortly after his promotion to assistant offensive coordinator with the Eagles, Urban took the Cincinnati Bengals' wide receivers coach position on February 21, 2011.

==== Baltimore Ravens ====
On January 5, 2018, Urban was hired by the Baltimore Ravens to be their new quarterbacks coach. During his tenure he has worked with quarterback Lamar Jackson on improving Jackson's delivery of a football, footwork and familiarity with the Ravens new offense.

Following the 2022 season, Urban vacated the role of quarterbacks coach and assumed the title of senior football analyst/game planning.
