= Nick Cole =

American football player (born 1984)

No. 59
- Position: Guard / Center

Personal information
- Born: July 28, 1984 (age 42); Lawton, Oklahoma, U.S.
- Listed height: 6 ft 0 in (1.83 m)
- Listed weight: 350 lb (159 kg)

Career information
- College: New Mexico State
- NFL draft: 2006: undrafted

Career history
- Philadelphia Eagles (2006–2010); Virginia Destroyers (2012)

Awards and highlights
- Second-team All-Sun Belt (2004)

Career NFL statistics
- Games played: 77
- Games started: 29
- Stats at Pro Football Reference

Nicholas Darnell Cole (born July 28, 1984) is an American former professional football player who was a guard and center in the National Football League (NFL). He played college football for the New Mexico State Aggies and was signed by the Philadelphia Eagles as an undrafted free agent in 2006.

== College career ==
Cole played college football for the New Mexico State Aggies.

== Professional career ==
=== Philadelphia Eagles ===
After going undrafted in the 2006 NFL draft, Cole signed with the Philadelphia Eagles as a free agent. He was named the third-string center behind Jamaal Jackson and Hank Fraley. He was later promoted to second string when Fraley was traded to the Cleveland Browns. He was also inserted as a fullback on short yardage and goal line situations. Besides being listed as a center, Cole is used as the primary backup at both guard positions. He was the lead blocker on many plays that went for touchdowns during the 2006 season. Cole started in place of Max Jean-Gilles when he was placed on injured reserve in 2008.

During the 2009 offseason, he signed his one-year restricted free agent tender to remain with the Eagles. Cole has started in all 14 games for the Eagles in 2009, with six starts coming at left guard due to a foot injury to Todd Herremans, and eight starts coming at right guard. After a knee injury knocked starting center Jamaal Jackson out of the week 16 game against the Denver Broncos, Cole shifted over to center where he played the rest of the game. Jackson's injury was later revealed to be a torn anterior cruciate ligament and Cole stayed at center for the remainder of the year.

On April 7, 2010, Cole signed his one-year restricted free agent tender to remain with the Eagles.
