= Jamaal Jackson =

American football player (born 1980)

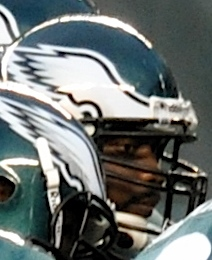
- Jackson in 2009

No. 67
- Position: Center

Personal information
- Born: May 8, 1980 (age 46); Miami, Florida, U.S.
- Listed height: 6 ft 4 in (1.93 m)
- Listed weight: 325 lb (147 kg)

Career information
- High school: Miami
- College: Delaware State
- NFL draft: 2003: undrafted

Career history
- Philadelphia Eagles (2003–2011)

Awards and highlights
- Sports Illustrated All-Pro honors (2006)

Career NFL statistics
- Games played: 88
- Games started: 72
- Stats at Pro Football Reference

Jamaal J. Jackson (born May 8, 1980) is an American former professional football player who was a center for the Philadelphia Eagles of the National Football League (NFL). After playing college football for Delaware State, he was signed by the Eagles as an undrafted free agent in 2003. He was the Eagles' starting center from 2005 to 2010.

== College career ==
After graduating from Miami High School of Miami, Florida, in 1998, Jackson played college football at Delaware State University.

== Professional career ==
After going undrafted in the 2003 NFL draft, Jackson was signed by the Philadelphia Eagles as a free agent. He spent the 2003 season on the team's practice squad and the 2004 season on the team's injured reserve list after suffering a torn triceps.

In the 2005 season he earned the starting job at center after Hank Fraley went down with an injury. He started all eight remaining games that season. He signed a seven-year extension with the Eagles on July 20, 2006. Jackson and Fraley appeared on the cover of the August 14, 2006 issue of Sports Illustrated, as they were in a battle for the starting center job—a rare feat for an offensive lineman. Jackson eventually beat out Fraley for the job when Fraley was traded to the Cleveland Browns.

Jackson started in every game for the Eagles from 2006–2008 after winning the starting job from Fraley.

After starting in the first 15 games in 2009, Jackson suffered a knee injury during a week 16 game against the Denver Broncos, which prevented him from playing in most of the game. Nick Cole replaced him at center. The knee injury turned out to be a torn anterior cruciate ligament (ACL), which kept Jackson from playing the rest of the year. He was placed on injured reserve on December 29. Jackson was placed on the Active/Physically Unable to Perform list at the beginning of training camp on July 26, 2010. He was activated on August 15.

Jackson was injured in the Eagles' season opener on September 12, 2010, against the Green Bay Packers and left the game. It was later revealed that he suffered a torn triceps, and would be out the remainder of the 2010 season. He was placed on injured reserve on September 13.

Jackson competed with rookie Jason Kelce during training camp in 2011 for the starting center job, but lost out as the Eagles changed offensive line schemes. He appeared in all 16 games in 2011 as a backup.

Jackson was released following the 2011 season on March 14, 2012. Jackson attended rookie mini-camp with the New York Giants in May 2012, but left the team after one day.

== Personal life ==
Jackson is married to Daira who is the owner of 7Zen HairArtistry in South Jersey where they reside. His daughters are Donaira, Ava, Amya, Jayaana and Daelania. His sons are Harry & Rah. His dog's name is Lucas.
