= Brodrick Bunkley =

American football player (born 1983)

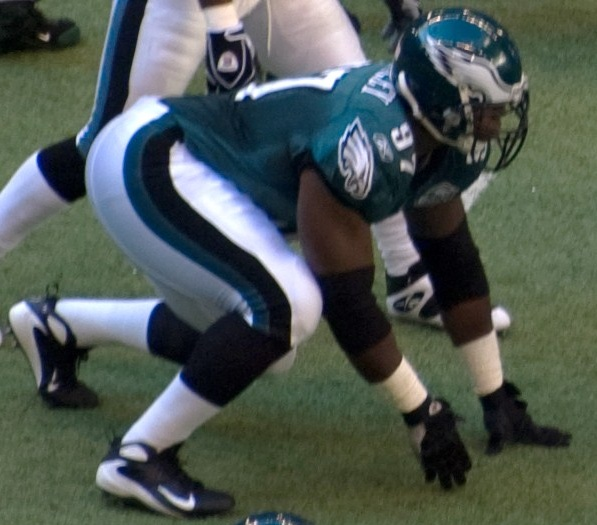
- Bunkley playing for the Philadelphia Eagles in 2007

No. 78, 97, 77
- Position: Nose tackle

Personal information
- Born: November 23, 1983 (age 42); Tampa, Florida, U.S.
- Listed height: 6 ft 3 in (1.91 m)
- Listed weight: 306 lb (139 kg)

Career information
- High school: George D. Chamberlain {Tampa)
- College: Florida State (2002–2005)
- NFL draft: 2006: 1st round, 14th overall pick

Career history
- Philadelphia Eagles (2006–2010); Denver Broncos (2011); New Orleans Saints (2012–2014)

Awards and highlights
- First-team All-American (2005); Second-team All-ACC (2005)

Career NFL statistics
- Total tackles: 240
- Sacks: 8.5
- Fumble recoveries: 3
- Stats at Pro Football Reference

Brodrick Bunkley (born November 23, 1983) is an American former professional football player who was a nose tackle in the National Football League (NFL). He was selected by the Philadelphia Eagles in the first round of the 2006 NFL draft. He played college football for the Florida State Seminoles. Bunkley also played for the Denver Broncos and New Orleans Saints.

== Early life ==
A native of Tampa, Florida, Bunkley attended George D. Chamberlain High School. In his senior year, Bunkley contributed 18 1/2 quarterback sacks, while the Chiefs, featuring seniors Brian Clark and Oliver Hoyte, as well as juniors Greg Lee and Joe Clermond, advanced to the Class 5A state finals, where they were upset 21–17 by the Naples Golden Eagles.

Regarded as a four-star recruit by Rivals.com, Bunkley was ranked as the No. 22 defensive tackle nationwide, in a class that was highlighted by Haloti Ngata, Rodrique Wright, and Gabe Watson. After official visits to Michigan State, Florida State, Florida, and Miami (FL), Bunkley chose the Seminoles.

== College career ==
In his true freshman season at Florida State, Bunkley appeared in eight games and totaled 13 tackles, one tackle for loss and three quarterback hurries. In the next-to-last game of the regular season against Florida, Bunkley injured his left knee on an apparent "chop block" by Gators guard Mo Mitchell, which caused him to miss the remainder of the season including the 2003 Sugar Bowl.

As a sophomore, Bunkley played in all 13 games, serving as a back-up to nose guard Jeff Womble. When Womble missed both the Virginia and Wake Forest due to injury, Bunkley stepped in as starter. For the season, Bunkley ranked third among defensive lineman with 38 tackles (19 solo, 19 assisted), including eight for a loss, and also had five QB hurries, two pass break-ups, one and a half sacks and a fumble recovery. Seminoles coaches named him Co-Defensive Newcomer of the Year, along with A. J. Nicholson.

After Womble's graduation, Bunkley took over as starting nose guard in 2004. However, he missed the second half of the season with a severe right high ankle sprain. Having only played in seven games, he finished the year with 12 tackles (three for loss), one sack and one quarterback hurry. He underwent surgery on his ankle after the season and was then ruled academically ineligible in the spring of 2005. He attended summer school, missing a portion of fall camp awaiting his grades.

With his eligibility re-instated, Bunkley started all 13 games at nose guard for the Seminoles. He ranked second nationally in tackles for loss by any defender with 25 (behind only Dan Bazuin's 26.5), thereby establishing a new single-season school record, surpassing Darnell Dockett's 23.5 from the 2001 season. Bunkley also lead the Seminoles with nine sacks, was second on the team in quarterback hurries with 15, and tied for third with 39 solo tackles. He was named a FWAA team first-team All-American and a CNNSI.com first-team All-American.

== Professional career ==
=== 2006 NFL draft ===
Projected a first-round pick, Bunkley was praised for his "tremendous first-step quickness" and "nasty attitude". At the NFL Scouting Combine, Bunkley had an impressive 44 repetitions on the 225-pound bench press.

On April 29, 2006, Bunkley was drafted by the Philadelphia Eagles in the first round (14th overall) of the 2006 NFL draft. He was one of four Florida State Seminoles defensive players taken in the first round of the draft, along with Ernie Sims, Kamerion Wimbley, and Antonio Cromartie. Bunkley was the highest selected defensive lineman selected by the Eagles since Corey Simon in 2000.

Pre-draft measurables
Height	Weight	Arm length	Hand span	40-yard dash	10-yard split	20-yard split	20-yard shuttle	Three-cone drill	Vertical jump	Broad jump	Bench press	Wonderlic
6 ft 2 3/4 in (1.90 m)	306 lb (139 kg)	33 1/8 in (0.84 m)	9 7/8 in (0.25 m)	4.95 s	1.69 s	2.90 s	4.16 s	7.33 s	32.5 in (0.83 m)	9 ft 5 in (2.87 m)	44 reps	15
All values from NFL Combine, except for 20-ss and 3-cone (which is from Florida State Pro Day)

=== Philadelphia Eagles ===
Bunkley held out until August 4, 2006, when he agreed to a six-year contract with the Eagles.

He was the Eagles' second-string defensive tackle during the 2006 season and played sparingly.

On November 19, 2006, Bunkley was suspended by the Eagles for one game as a result of him missing the team flight to Indianapolis. Bunkley claimed he missed the team flight because he was picking up some fried chicken for the defensive line, as part of a rookie tradition.

In the 2007 season, Bunkley became a starting defensive tackle for the Eagles alongside Mike Patterson. He recorded 30 tackles and three sacks. After becoming the starter in 2007, Bunkley started in every game in 2008 and 2009. In week 5 of the 2010 season, Bunkley suffered an elbow injury, but managed to play in 14 games.

=== Denver Broncos ===
Bunkley was traded to the Cleveland Browns in exchange for a fifth-round pick in the 2012 NFL draft on July 30, 2011, but the trade was voided after Bunkley did not report. He was instead traded to the Denver Broncos in exchange for a conditional pick in the 2013 NFL draft on August 1. He played in all 16 regular season games for the Broncos, as well as their two playoff games.

=== New Orleans Saints ===
On March 21, 2012, Bunkley agreed to terms on a 5-year, $25 million contract with the New Orleans Saints.

On November 25, 2012, Bunkley was ejected from a game against the San Francisco 49ers when he kicked the 49ers' Alex Boone in the head, after Boone attempted to punch him in the groin. Bunkley was fined $20,000 for his illegal kick. Bunkley started 15 games for the Saints in 2012 and 10 games in 2013.

In 2014 Bunkley started the first 11 games of the season, but after suffering a quadriceps injury in the Saints' game against Baltimore, he was placed on the injured reserve list on November 27, 2014. The Saints released Bunkley on July 28, 2015, following a failed physical.

=== NFL statistics ===
Year	Team	GP	COMB	TOTAL	AST	SACK	FF	FR	FR YDS	INT	IR YDS	AVG IR	LNG IR	TD	PD
2006	PHI	15	9	6	3	0.0	0	0	0	0	0	0	0	0	0
2007	PHI	15	31	24	7	3.0	0	1	0	0	0	0	0	0	0
2008	PHI	16	47	34	13	2.0	0	1	0	0	0	0	0	0	2
2009	PHI	16	37	30	7	1.0	0	1	0	0	0	0	0	0	4
2010	PHI	14	20	17	3	0.0	0	0	0	0	0	0	0	0	1
2011	DEN	16	43	33	10	0.0	0	0	0	0	0	0	0	0	0
2012	NO	15	23	10	13	2.5	0	0	0	0	0	0	0	0	2
2013	NO	12	13	8	5	0.0	0	0	0	0	0	0	0	0	0
Career		130	240	170	70	8.5	0	3	0	0	0	0	0	0	9
