= 2006 Philadelphia Eagles season =

74th season in franchise history

- Owner: Jeffrey Lurie
- Head coach: Andy Reid
- Offensive coordinator: Marty Mornhinweg
- Defensive coordinator: Jim Johnson
- Home stadium: Lincoln Financial Field

Results
- Record: 10–6
- Division place: 1st NFC East
- Playoffs: Won Wild Card Playoffs (vs. Giants) 23–20; Lost Divisional Playoffs (at Saints) 24–27
- Pro Bowlers: OG Shawn Andrews; CB Lito Sheppard; FS Brian Dawkins

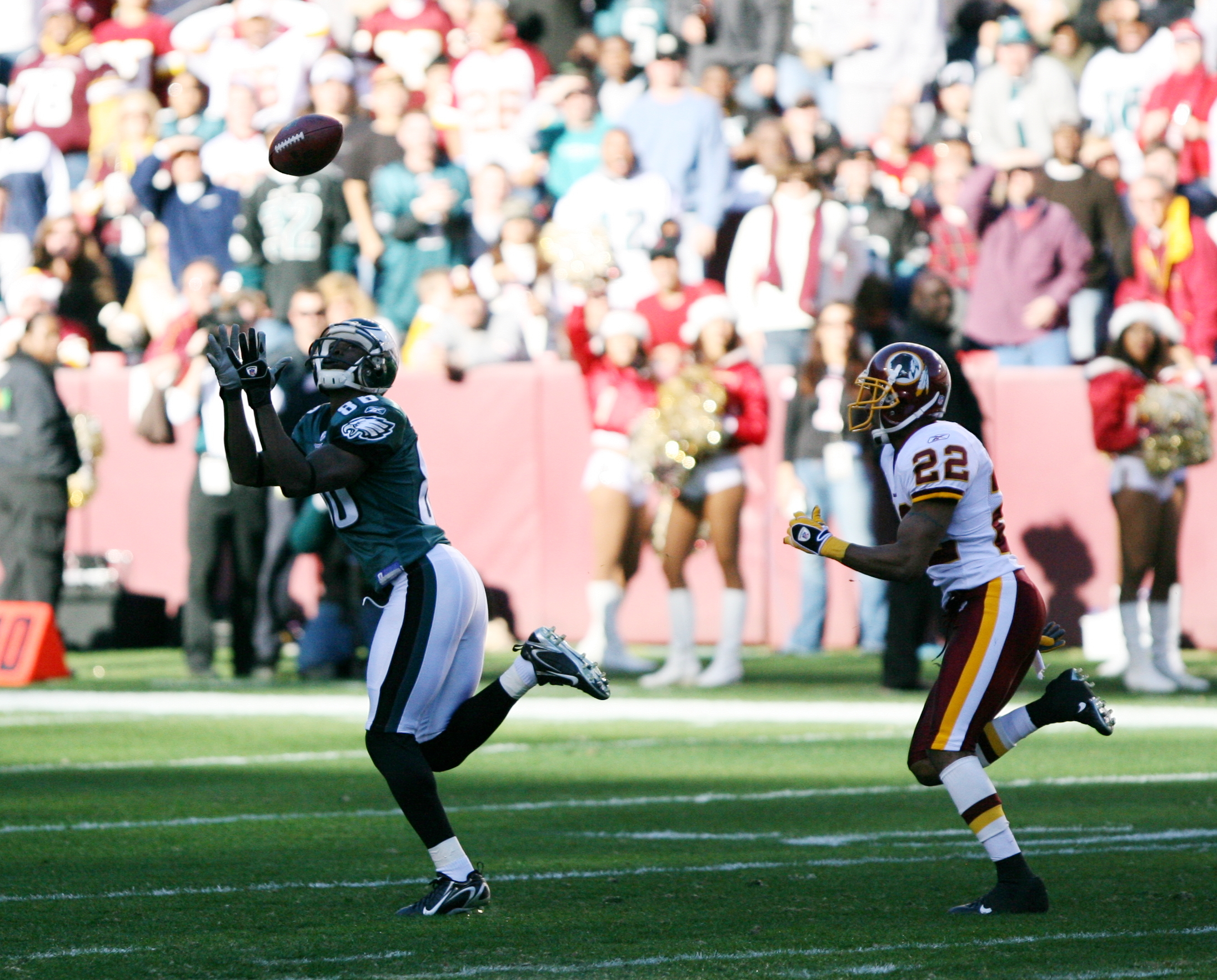
Philadelphia's Reggie Brown goes for a catch at Washington in their 2006 week-14 matchup

The 2006 Philadelphia Eagles season was the franchise's 74th season in the National Football League (NFL), and the eighth under head coach Andy Reid. the Eagles improved on their 6–10 record from 2005 and finishing 10–6, reclaiming the NFC East, and winning a playoff game at home. The season ended in a Divisional Round playoff loss to the New Orleans Saints, but was seen as a success in the face of the adversity of losing starting quarterback Donovan McNabb to injury in Week 11.

The Eagles won four of their first five games, but they underwent a mid-season downturn that left them 5–6 and without McNabb. Backup quarterback Jeff Garcia stepped in and running back Brian Westbrook stepped up as the season turned around for Philadelphia. The team came back from the dead in late November to win their last five regular season games, surprisingly winning the NFC East division title after a three-game December road sweep of all of its division rivals. In the playoffs, the Eagles beat the New York Giants 23–20 in the Wild Card round before losing to the Saints in the Divisional round.

McNabb started the season with MVP-caliber numbers before his November injury, while Garcia was efficient, running the "West Coast offense" perfectly and completing eleven touchdown passes with only two interceptions. Westbrook became the focal point of the team's offense after the loss of McNabb, and responded by rushing for 1,217 yards and racking up 699 receiving yards. Trade acquisition Donté Stallworth combined with second-year wideout Reggie Brown to catch 15 touchdown passes and amass 1,541 receiving yards. Meanwhile, the offensive line was a quiet strength of the team, featuring emerging star Shawn Andrews and a group that started all 16 games together. The offense managed to morph from a quick-strike team under McNabb to a methodical balanced attack under Garcia while finishing No. 2 in yards in the league.

The defense was much improved from the previous season. The early season pass rush was savage, and the team appeared to be on the way to a sacks record, but a season-ending injury to Jevon Kearse and attrition weakened the defensive line. During the team's mid-season slump, the run defense was porous, but an elevation in play, spearheaded by defensive leader and All-Pro Brian Dawkins, helped the team turnaround. Trent Cole had eight of the team's 40 sacks and Lito Sheppard and his six interceptions made the Pro Bowl. The defense snagged 19 picks, returning four of them for touchdowns.

== Offseason ==
In the 2006 NFL draft, the Eagles used their first pick on Florida State defensive tackle Brodrick Bunkley. Then they used their next pick (acquired from the Tennessee Titans) on Southern California offensive tackle Winston Justice. The rest of their picks included California Polytechnic State defensive end Chris Gocong, Georgia guard Max Jean-Gilles, Michigan wide receiver Jason Avant, Colorado wide receiver Jeremy Bloom, Tennessee linebacker Omar Gaither, and Southern California defensive tackle LaJuan Ramsey.

When the team met for training camp in the summer, they looked to erase the bad taste left by the disastrous 2005 season. Quarterback Donovan McNabb, returning from his sports hernia injury of the previous season, declared that he believed the team to be capable of reaching the Super Bowl. However, most of the national sports media picked the Eagles to finish last in a highly competitive NFC East.

Correll Buckhalter returned after two years on injured reserve and the team added depth to the offensive and defensive lines. At the end of training camp, the Eagles cut two long-standing players from the team. They let maligned wide receiver Todd Pinkston go, due to his lingering Achilles tendon injury from the previous season. The team also released backup quarterback Koy Detmer, with former Pro Bowler Jeff Garcia and former Eagle A. J. Feeley becoming the team's new backups.

There was criticism based around the Eagles' failure to adequately replace departed wide receiver Terrell Owens. However, with about a week left until the regular season began, the Eagles made a trade to get Donté Stallworth from the New Orleans Saints for linebacker Mark Simoneau and a conditional fourth-round draft pick in 2007.

== Staff ==
2006 Philadelphia Eagles staff
Front office: Chairman/chief executive officer – Jeffrey Lurie; President – Joe Banner; General manager – Tom Heckert; Vice president of player personnel – Jason Licht; Vice president of football administration – Howie Roseman; Director of pro personnel – Scott Cohen; Director of college scouting – Ryan Grigson; Head coaches: Head coach – Andy Reid; Assistant head coach/offensive coordinator – Marty Mornhinweg; Assistant to the head coach – James Urban; Offensive coaches: Quarterbacks – Pat Shurmur; Running backs – Ted Williams; Wide receivers – David Culley; Tight ends – Tom Melvin; Offensive line – Juan Castillo; Offensive assistant/quality control – Bill Shuey; Statistical analysis coordinator – Mike Frazier	Defensive coaches: Defensive coordinator – Jim Johnson; Defensive line – Pete Jenkins; Linebackers – Steve Spagnuolo; Secondary – Trent Walters; Safeties – Sean McDermott; Defensive assistant/quality control – Mike Reed; Special teams coaches: Special teams coordinator – John Harbaugh; Special teams quality control – Rory Segrest; Kicking coach – Randy Brown; Strength and conditioning: Head athletic trainer – Rick Burkholder; Strength and conditioning – Mike Wolf; Assistant strength and conditioning – Bob Rogucki

== Philadelphia Eagles Draft ==
2006 Philadelphia Eagles draft
Round	Pick	Player	Position	College	Notes
1	14	Brodrick Bunkley	DT	Florida State	
2	39	Winston Justice	OT	USC	From Tennessee
3	71	Chris Gocong	LB	Cal Poly	From NY Jets
4	99	Max Jean-Gilles	G	Georgia	From New Orleans
4	109	Jason Avant	WR	Michigan	From Green Bay via St. Louis
5	147	Jeremy Bloom	WR	Colorado	
5	168	Omar Gaither	LB	Tennessee	Compensatory Pick
6	204	LaJuan Ramsey	DT	USC	Compensatory Pick
Made roster † Pro Football Hall of Fame * Made at least one Pro Bowl during career

== Roster ==
2006 Philadelphia Eagles roster
Quarterbacks (QB): 14 A. J. Feeley; 7 Jeff Garcia; Running backs (RB): 28 Correll Buckhalter; 34 Reno Mahe KR/PR; 23 Ryan Moats; 35 Bruce Perry; 38 Thomas Tapeh FB; 36 Brian Westbrook; Wide receivers (WR): 81 Jason Avant; 84 Hank Baskett; 86 Reggie Brown; 83 Greg Lewis; 18 Donté Stallworth; Tight ends (TE): 89 Matt Schobel; 82 L. J. Smith	Offensive linemen (OL): 73 Shawn Andrews G; 59 Nick Cole C; 79 Todd Herremans G; 67 Jamaal Jackson C; 62 Max Jean-Gilles G; 74 Winston Justice T; 68 Pat McCoy T; 69 Jon Runyan T; 72 Tra Thomas T; 71 Scott Young G; Defensive linemen (DL): 78 Brodrick Bunkley DT; 58 Trent Cole DE; 90 Darren Howard DE; 95 Jerome McDougle DE; 98 Mike Patterson DT; 77 LaJuan Ramsey DT; 91 Sam Rayburn DT; 75 Juqua Thomas DE; 97 Darwin Walker DT	Linebackers (LB): 56 Shawn Barber OLB; 50 Tank Daniels OLB; 96 Omar Gaither OLB; 55 Dhani Jones OLB; 51 Matt McCoy OLB; 53 Dedrick Roper MLB; 54 Jeremiah Trotter MLB; Defensive backs (DB): 24 Sheldon Brown CB; 37 Sean Considine SS; 20 Brian Dawkins FS; 22 Joselio Hanson CB; 29 Roderick Hood CB; 21 Will James CB; 32 Michael Lewis SS; 27 Quintin Mikell SS; 26 Lito Sheppard CB; Special teams (ST): 2 David Akers K; 46 Jon Dorenbos LS; 10 Dirk Johnson P	Practice squad: 25 Dustin Fox CB; 19 Michael Gasperson WR; 63 Jasper Harvey C; 4 Omar Jacobs QB; 52 Greg Richmond LB; 13 Bill Sampy WR; 49 Zach Tuiasosopo FB; 85 Lee Vickers TE; Reserve: 88 Mike Bartrum LS (IR); 11 Jeremy Bloom WR (IR); 42 Jason Davis FB (IR); 57 Chris Gocong LB (IR); 93 Jevon Kearse DE (IR); 5 Donovan McNabb QB (IR); 64 Stefan Rodgers T (IR); Rookies in italics 53 active, 7 reserve, 8 practice squad

== Preseason ==
Week	Date	Opponent	Result	Record	Venue	Recap
HOF	August 6	vs. Oakland Raiders	L 10–16	0–1	Fawcett Stadium (Canton)	Recap
1	August 10	Cleveland Browns	W 20–7	1–1	Lincoln Financial Field	Recap
2	August 17	at Baltimore Ravens	L 10–20	1–2	M&T Bank Stadium	Recap
3	August 25	Pittsburgh Steelers	W 16–7	2–2	Lincoln Financial Field	Recap
4	September 1	at New York Jets	L 17–20	2–3	Giants Stadium	Recap

== Regular season ==
=== Schedule ===
Week	Date	Opponent	Result	Record	Venue	Recap
1	September 10	at Houston Texans	**W** 24–10	1–0	Reliant Stadium	Recap
2	September 17	**New York Giants**	**L** 24–30 (OT)	1–1	Lincoln Financial Field	Recap
3	September 24	at San Francisco 49ers	**W** 38–24	2–1	Monster Park	Recap
4	October 2	Green Bay Packers	**W** 31–9	3–1	Lincoln Financial Field	Recap
5	October 8	**Dallas Cowboys**	**W** 38–24	4–1	Lincoln Financial Field	Recap
6	October 15	at New Orleans Saints	**L** 24–27	4–2	Louisiana Superdome	Recap
7	October 22	at Tampa Bay Buccaneers	**L** 21–23	4–3	Raymond James Stadium	Recap
8	October 29	Jacksonville Jaguars	**L** 6–13	4–4	Lincoln Financial Field	Recap
9	Bye					
10	November 12	**Washington Redskins**	**W** 27–3	5–4	Lincoln Financial Field	Recap
11	November 19	Tennessee Titans	**L** 13–31	5–5	Lincoln Financial Field	Recap
12	November 26	at Indianapolis Colts	**L** 21–45	5–6	RCA Dome	Recap
13	December 4	Carolina Panthers	**W** 27–24	6–6	Lincoln Financial Field	Recap
14	December 10	at **Washington Redskins**	**W** 21–19	7–6	FedExField	Recap
15	December 17	at **New York Giants**	**W** 36–22	8–6	Giants Stadium	Recap
16	December 25	at **Dallas Cowboys**	**W** 23–7	9–6	Texas Stadium	Recap
17	December 31	Atlanta Falcons	**W** 24–17	10–6	Lincoln Financial Field	Recap

Note: Intra-division opponents are in bold text.

=== Game summaries ===
==== Week 1: at Houston Texans ====
	1	2	3	4	Total
**Eagles**	0	14	7	3	**24**
Texans	7	3	0	0	**10**

at Reliant Stadium, Houston, Texas

The Eagles opened the regular season on the road against the Houston Texans on September 10. The Eagles trailed early, as Texans QB David Carr completed a 25-yard TD pass to WR Eric Moulds. The Eagles would respond in the second quarter as QB Donovan McNabb completed a 42-yard TD pass to WR Donte' Stallworth. Even though Texans kicker Kris Brown would make a 34-yard field goal, the Eagles would take the lead for good as McNabb completed a 5-yard pass to WR Reggie Brown. In the second half, Philadelphia would wrap up the win with a 31-yard TD pass to RB Brian Westbrook in the third quarter and Kicker David Akers making a 42-yard field goal in the fourth quarter.

==== Week 2: vs. New York Giants ====
	1	2	3	4	OT	Total
**Giants**	7	0	0	17	6	**30**
Eagles	7	10	7	0	0	**24**

at Lincoln Financial Field, Philadelphia |weather= 81 °F (27 °C) (Sunny) The Eagles Week 2 home opener began similar to the game against the Houston Texans, the Giants marched downfield on their first drive with a touchdown pass from Eli Manning to Amani Toomer. Similar to the Houston game, the Eagles would proceed to destroy the Giants offense with 8 sacks and amass over 400 yards on the Giants defense going a 24-point scoring run. However, in the 4th quarter, the Eagles completely collapsed on offense with a Brian Westbrook fumble, dropped passes and the inability to convert key 3rd downs to run out the clock. The defense failed to capitalize on a Plaxico Burress fumble in the redzone which turned into a touchdown for the Giants. The Eagles also began giving Eli Manning time to connect with his receivers downfield. Towards the end of regulation, Eagles defensive end Trent Cole was flagged for a personal foul which allowed Giants kicker Jay Feely to tie the game with a field goal.

The game proceeded to overtime with the Eagles offensive woes continuing and the defense allowing the Giants to score a miraculous touchdown on 3rd a long from Manning to Burress. To add to the loss, the Eagles lost Jevon Kearse for the remainder of the season with a knee injury.

==== Week 3: at San Francisco 49ers ====
	1	2	3	4	Total
**Eagles**	14	10	7	7	**38**
49ers	0	3	7	14	**24**

at Candlestick Park, San Francisco, California

Hoping to take out their frustration from the previous week's performance, where they gave up a 17-point lead in the fourth quarter and lost to the Giants, the Eagles flew to the West Coast to take on the San Francisco 49ers. The Eagles started off well with RB Brian Westbrook catching a 4-yard TD pass from QB Donovan McNabb, along with TE L.J. Smith catching a 1-yard TD pass. In the second quarter, the 49ers would get on the board with kicker Joe Nedney kicking a 48-yard field goal, but the Eagles made sure to stay as far away as possible, with Brian Westbrook making a spectacular 71-yard TD run, along with kicker David Akers booting a 21-yard field goal. In the third quarter, Philadelphia took advantage of a Niners miscue, as DT Mike Patterson returned a fumble 98 yards for a touchdown. San Francisco would get a touchdown, ona a 1-yard run by rookie RB Noah Robinson. In the fourth quarter, Noah Robinson would get another 1-yard TD run, but the Eagles managed to put the game away with Brian Westbrook getting an 8-yard TD run. The 49ers would get one more TD, as QB Alex Smith completed a 15-yard pass to TE Eric Johnson, but fortunately, the Eagles would avenge last week's collapse with a win to give them the lead in the NFC East at 2–1.

==== Week 4: vs. Green Bay Packers ====
	1	2	3	4	Total
Packers	3	6	0	0	**9**
**Eagles**	0	7	17	7	**31**

at Lincoln Financial Field, Philadelphia |weather= 60 °F (16 °C) (Clear) Following their dominating road win over the 49ers, the Eagles returned home for a Monday Night match-up with the Green Bay Packers. Early in the game, the Eagles offense struggled with two goal-line fumbles being recovered by the Packers. In the first quarter, Packers kicker Dave Rayner nailed a 23-yard field goal for the only score of the period. In the second quarter, Philadelphia would score on QB Donovan McNabb's 6-yard TD run. However, Green Bay managed to get two more field goals, as Rayner got a 54-yarder and a 46-yarder to end the half. In the second half, it was all Eagles, as in the third quarter, kicker David Akers got a 40-yard field goal, while McNabb and WR Greg Lewis connected on two touchdown passes of 45 and 30 yards. In the fourth quarter, the Philly offense wrapped things up as McNabb got a 15-yard TD run, while the defense ended the game on a goal-line stand. With their victory, the Eagles managed to get their first home win of the season as the team improved to 3–1.

==== Week 5: vs. Dallas Cowboys ====
Team	1	2	3	4	Total
Cowboys	7	14	0	3	24
• Eagles	10	7	7	14	38

- Date: October 8
- Location: Lincoln Financial Field
- Game attendance: 69,268
- Game weather: Sunny; 72 °F (22 °C)
- Television network: FOX

Scoring summary
Q1	11:37	PHI	Westbrook 5 yard run (Akers kick)	PHI 7–0
Q1	9:59	PHI	Akers 27 yard field goal	PHI 10–0
Q1	4:11	DAL	Barber 2 yard run (Vanderjagt kick)	PHI 10–7
Q2	10:30	DAL	Ware 69 yard fumble return (Vanderjagt kick)	DAL 14–10
Q2	9:13	PHI	McNabb 1 yard run (Akers kick)	PHI 17–14
Q2	3:23	DAL	Bledsoe 7 yard run (Vanderjagt kick)	DAL 21–17
Q3	7:28	PHI	Baskett 87 yard pass from McNabb (Akers kick)	PHI 24–21
Q4	11:14	DAL	Vanderjagt 39 yard field goal	Tie 24–24
Q4	8:23	PHI	Brown 40 yard pass from McNabb (Akers kick)	PHI 31–24
Q4	0:16	PHI	Sheppard 102 yard interception return (Akers kick)	PHI 38–24

In a game that was hyped by wide receiver Terrell Owens' return to Philadelphia as a Cowboy (FOX promoted it as being the game of the year), the Eagles went up against their long-time rival at home, as another chapter was written in the famed Dallas Cowboys–Philadelphia Eagles rivalry. In the first quarter, the Eagles drew first blood as running back Brian Westbrook got a 5-yard TD run (which was set up on a fumbled punt attempt), while kicker David Akers kicked a 27-yard field goal after a quarterback Drew Bledsoe fumble. The Cowboys would score in the period, as running back Marion Barber got a 2-yard TD run. In the second quarter, Cowboys OLB Greg Ellis sacked QB Donovan McNabb, causing him to fumble, which was picked up by OLB DeMarcus Ware who returned it 69 yards for a touchdown. McNabb would make up for his fumble by getting a 1-yard touchdown on a QB sneak after a long completion to L.J. Smith. However, the Eagles trailed at halftime, as Bledsoe ran 7 yards for a score. In the third quarter, Philadelphia would get back on top, as McNabb threw an 87-yard bomb to rookie wide receiver Hank Baskett. In the fourth quarter, the Cowboys evened the score with a Mike Vanderjagt 39-yard field goal. The Eagles responded with a 40-yard McNabb to Reggie Brown flea-flicker touchdown. With Dallas threatening to tie the score late in the game, cornerback Lito Sheppard, who already had an interception, returned a Bledsoe pass 102 yards for a touchdown. With their 38–24 victory, Philadelphia managed to take the lead in the NFC East. McNabb finished with 354 yards, two passing TDs and one rushing TD, while Owens was a nonfactor with only 3 catches for 45 yards and several drops. Stats The win ended the Eagles seven-game losing streak to their division rivals.

==== Week 6: at New Orleans Saints ====
	1	2	3	4	Total
Eagles	0	3	14	7	**24**
**Saints**	10	7	0	10	**27**

at the Louisiana Superdome, New Orleans, Louisiana

The Eagles lost a tight one to the resurgent New Orleans Saints in a loud and excited Louisiana Superdome.

The Eagles, possibly suffering a letdown after their dramatic win over Dallas the previous week, came out sluggish and fell behind 10–0. They were about to get the ball with 1:56 left in the 2nd quarter, but Ryan Moats and Dexter Wynn muffed the punt return, turning it over to the Saints, who proceeded to score on a very short field to send the game into halftime with a commanding 17–3 lead.

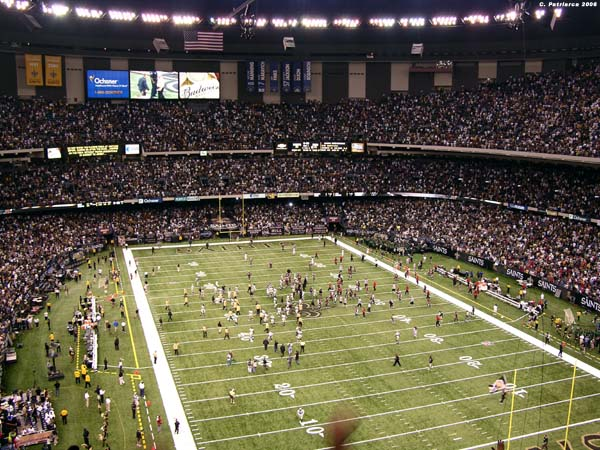
The Louisiana Superdome during the game on October 15, 2006

The second half was a different story, however. The Eagles scored almost immediately on a 60-yard catch and run by Reggie Brown. A 4-yard Donovan McNabb pass to tight end L.J. Smith evened up the game at 17. A Darwin Walker interception set up a 15-yard counter by Brown on the first play of the 4th quarter, giving the Eagles their first lead. It looked as though the Eagles would survive their sluggish start and the many drops by receivers. Unfortunately, the Eagles late-game struggles would return as the Saints scored on a blown coverage by struggling strong safety Michael Lewis, who was burned by Joe Horn. With 8:36 left, the Saints got the ball back and quarterback Drew Brees methodically drove the Saints down the field. without any remaining timeouts, the Eagles watched helplessly as New Orleans ran down the clock before John Carney kicked a game-winning 27-yard chip shot. The Eagles lost the game 27–24 and fell to 4–2, but remained in first place in the NFC East. McNabb finished with 247 yards and two touchdowns.

==== Week 7: at Tampa Bay Buccaneers ====
	1	2	3	4	Total
Eagles	0	0	7	14	**21**
**Buccaneers**	0	7	10	6	**23**

at Raymond James Stadium, Tampa, Florida

For the second straight week, a last-second field goal did in the Eagles. They started off poorly again, being held scoreless in the first half. Donovan McNabb tossed three interceptions in the first three quarters, with two of them being returned for touchdowns by Tampa Bay cornerback Ronde Barber. Trailing 17–0, McNabb found fullback Thomas Tapeh in the end zone. A short touchdown pass to Reggie Brown brought the Eagles to within three. The Bucs added a field goal, making it 20–14. With :33 left in the game, Brian Westbrook took a short pass and rumbled to a 52-yard touchdown. The point after gave the Eagles the lead, and it seemed as though they had pulled out a dramatic victory. However, a last-ditch 62-yard field goal attempt by Matt Bryant somehow made it through the uprights, robbing Philadelphia of the win. Westbrook had over 100 yards in both rushing and receiving in the defeat. Because of this loss, and a win by the New York Giants one night later against the Dallas Cowboys, the Eagles slid into second place in the NFC East.

==== Week 8: vs. Jacksonville Jaguars ====
	1	2	3	4	Total
**Jaguars**	7	0	3	3	**13**
Eagles	0	0	3	3	**6**

at Lincoln Financial Field, Philadelphia |weather= 54 °F (12 °C) (Sunny) Facing a battered Jacksonville Jaguar team missing starting quarterback Byron Leftwich, the Eagles turned in their worst performance of the season to this point. Philadelphia's high-powered offense was held scoreless in the first half (they failed to record a first down until the middle of the second quarter). Running backs Fred Taylor and Maurice Jones-Drew combined with quarterback David Garrard to rush for 216 yards and a touchdown. The Eagles managed two David Akers field goals in the second half, but their attempts at a rally fell short. The Eagles had considered the game a borderline must-win, but instead headed into their bye week at 4–4 (2-2 at home & 0-2 against the AFC South). This was the Eagles last loss to Jacksonville until 2026.

==== Week 10: vs. Washington Redskins ====
	1	2	3	4	Total
Redskins	0	3	0	0	**3**
**Eagles**	10	7	10	0	**27**

at Lincoln Financial Field, Philadelphia |weather= 61 °F (16 °C) (Rain) The Eagles got their season back on track with a 27–3 rout of the division-rival Washington Redskins. After a David Akers field goal on the opening possession, Donovan McNabb found Donté Stallworth for an 84-yard bomb. Philadelphia's explosive offense struck again when running back Correll Buckhalter recovered a dropped pass in the air from teammate Reggie Brown and raced for a touchdown. The sensational play gave the Eagles a 17–0 early lead, a rare luxury for them. Washington got a Nick Novak field goal before the half ended, but they could not reach the end zone on the Eagles defense. In the third quarter, Akers added a short field goal, making it 20–3. Later in the quarter, the Redskins were driving for a score, but quarterback Mark Brunell threw an interception to cornerback Sheldon Brown who returned it 70 yards to the house, putting Philadelphia up 27–3 and closing the door on Washington. Stallworth returned in a big way with 139 yards on six catches, and Brian Westbrook rushed for 122 yards on a season-high 22 carries.

==== Week 11: vs. Tennessee Titans ====
	1	2	3	4	Total
**Titans**	7	3	14	7	**31**
Eagles	3	3	0	7	**13**

at Lincoln Financial Field, Philadelphia |weather= 47 °F (8 °C) (Cloudy) A matchup that pitted the Eagles' No. 1 offense against the league's worst defense turned into a disaster for the Eagles, as they lost to the heavy underdog Titans . The Tennessee Titans scored on the opening drive with a 14-yard reception by tight end Ben Troupe. An apparent Brian Westbrook touchdown reception was reversed by a coach's challenge and Donovan McNabb tossed an interception the next play. The Eagles got on the board at the end of the quarter with a 42-yard field goal by David Akers, making it 7–3. Early in the second quarter, McNabb was pushed out of bounds at the end of a scramble, and had to be carted off of the field with a knee injury. Backup quarterback Jeff Garcia came into the game and helped drive the Eagles to another field goal, closing the gap to 7–6. Vince Young led the Titans to a scoring drive of their own before the end of the half, making it 10–6. In the third quarter, the Eagles saw their season slip away from them. Travis Henry broke a 70-yard touchdown run, then Pacman Jones returned a Dirk Johnson punt 90 yards. The Titans led 24–6 and Garcia, who had 48 pass attempts in less than three quarters, could only register a short touchdown pass to L.J. Smith. A botched shotgun snap led to a humiliating, late defensive touchdown for Tennessee. Westbrook rushed for 102 yards in the 31–13 loss. McNabb's knee injury was revealed after the game to be a torn ACL, knocking him out for the season. At the time, it was thought that the loss of the game and McNabb would virtually crush Philadelphia's playoff hopes.

==== Week 12: at Indianapolis Colts ====
	1	2	3	4	Total
Eagles	0	7	7	7	**21**
**Colts**	7	17	7	14	**45**

at the RCA Dome, Indianapolis, Indiana

The McNabb-less Eagles travelled to Indiana to take on the 9–1 Eventual Super Bowl Champion Indianapolis Colts. Any chances of victory would be reliant upon a strong defensive showing, but the Colts stormed ahead behind three rushing touchdowns by rookie Joseph Addai in the first two quarters. Philadelphia's new starting quarterback, Jeff Garcia, found L.J. Smith for a 1-yard touchdown to make it 21–7 in the second quarter. Adam Vinatieri booted a 44-yard kick before the end of the half for Indianapolis. Peyton Manning tossed an 11-yard touchdown pass to Reggie Wayne making it 31–7 Colts in the third quarter. The Eagles showed signs of life with touchdowns by Reggie Brown and Brian Westbrook to climb within ten with about ten minutes to play. However, Addai scored his fourth touchdown of the game and a Garcia fumble led to a defensive touchdown for the Colts, making it 45–21 – a score representative of how overmatched the Eagles appeared all night. The Colts rushed for 237 yards on the Eagles' beleaguered defense. Westbrook had his third consecutive 100-yard game – the first Eagle to do that since Wilbert Montgomery 25 years ago. The loss dropped the Eagles to under .500 for the first time all year.

==== Week 13: vs. Carolina Panthers ====
	1	2	3	4	Total
Panthers	7	7	7	3	**24**
**Eagles**	0	7	7	13	**27**

at Lincoln Financial Field, Philadelphia |weather= 32 °F (0 °C) (Clear) Behind a gutsy performance by quarterback Jeff Garcia and their defense, the Eagles prevailed on Monday Night Football against the Carolina Panthers. The Panthers struck first with a Jake Delhomme touchdown pass to Steve Smith (Carolina Panthers). The Eagles responded with an eight-yard touchdown reception by Brian Westbrook in the second quarter. Carolina retook the lead when Keyshawn Johnson reeled in a short touchdown pass just before the half. Garcia and Delhomme continued to trade blows in the second half, as Garcia found Donté Stallworth for a thirty-yard game-tying reception. Minutes later, DeAngelo Williams took a screen pass 35 yards to the end zone, making it 21–14 Carolina. The teams traded field goals, putting the score at 24–17. On Philadelphia's next possession, Garcia found Westbrook for a 29-yard gain, then hit Reggie Brown for a forty-yard game-tying touchdown on the next play. A Brian Dawkins interception and return set up David Akers' 25-yard go-ahead field goal. With less than a minute left, Carolina drove into Eagles' territory, but Lito Sheppard made a clutch interception of Delhomme in the end zone, preserving the 27–24 win. Garcia passed for 312 yards and three touchdowns. The win put the Eagles at 6–6, and kept them in the NFC playoff hunt.

==== Week 14: at Washington Redskins ====
	1	2	3	4	Total
**Eagles**	7	14	0	0	**21**
Redskins	3	3	10	3	**19**

at FedExField, Landover, Maryland

Beginning a three-game NFC East road trip, the Eagles hung on to sweep the Washington Redskins 21–19. Washington was able to run the ball all day and Ladell Betts, who finished with 171 rushing yards, led the Redskins to a 3–0 lead after their first drive with kicker Shaun Suisham getting the field goal. The Eagles responded with three straight touchdowns. An interception by rookie linebacker Omar Gaither set up a Jeff Garcia to L.J. Smith touchdown. With Washington in the Eagles' red zone, safety Michael Lewis reeled in a tipped pass and returned it for a touchdown. Finally, Donte' Stallworth recorded a touchdown reception after a drive which featured a 60-yard catch and run by Reggie Brown. Field goals by Suisham just before and just after halftime allowed the Redskins to linger. A 34-yard touchdown pass from Jason Campbell to Antwaan Randle El made it a 21–16 game as the fourth quarter began. The Eagles offense sputtered throughout the second half, and the Redskins drove it to the Eagles 3-yard line. However, a clutch sack by safety Brian Dawkins forced Washington to settle for a field goal. Then the Philadelphia offense made sure the Redskins didn't get the ball back by driving down the field and running out the clock. The resurgent Garcia had a pair of touchdown passes and the 7–6 Eagles remained very much alive in the playoff chase.

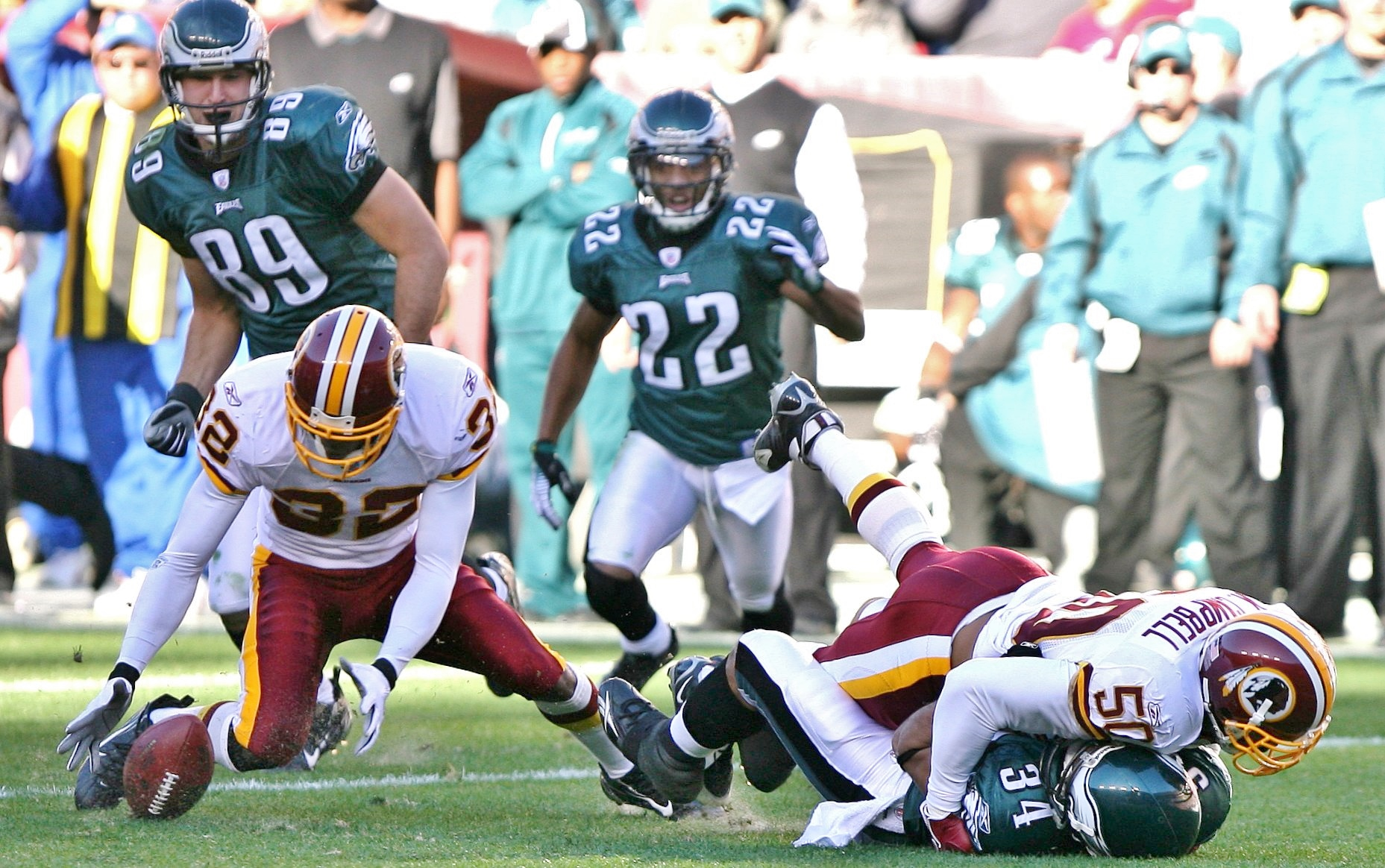
Philadelphia fumbles against Washington in week 14

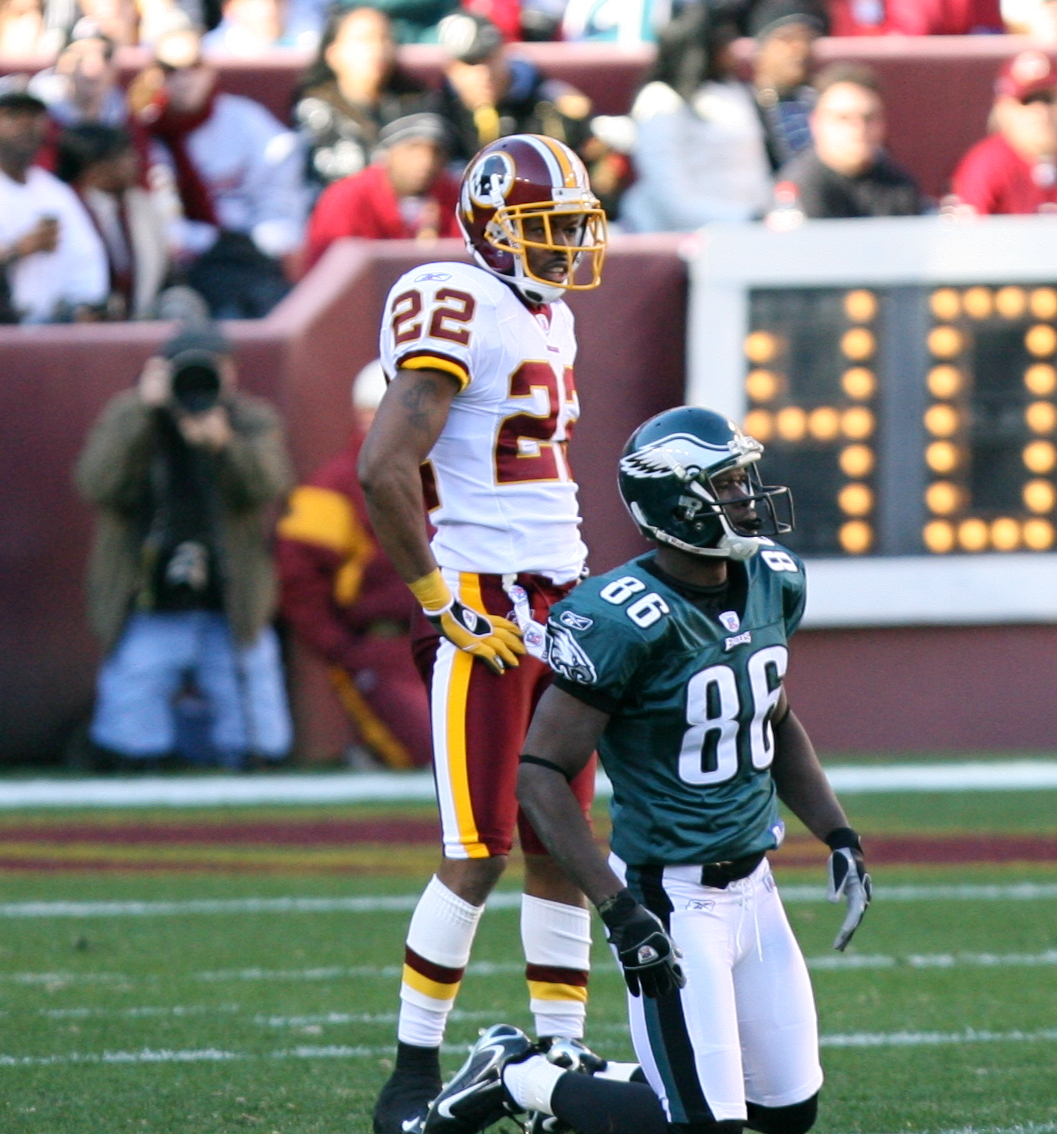
Reggie Brown down after a passing play

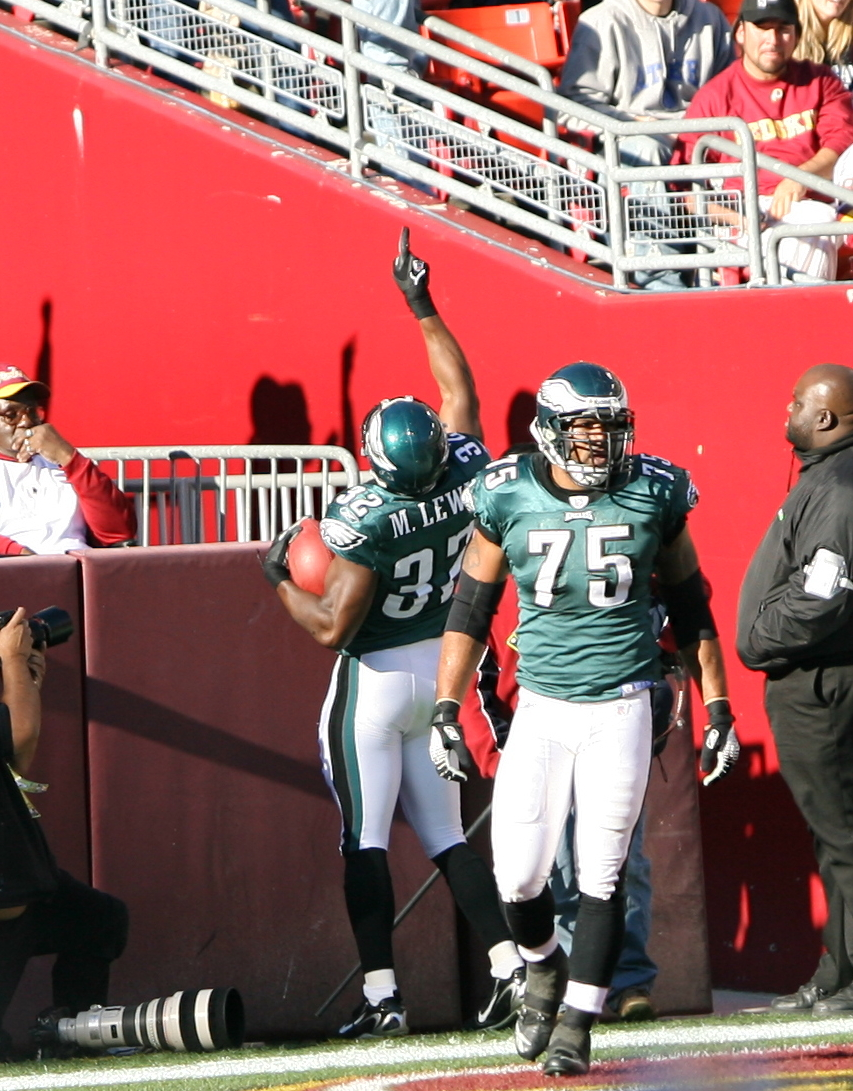
Jaqua Parker and Michael Lewis celebrate a touchdown

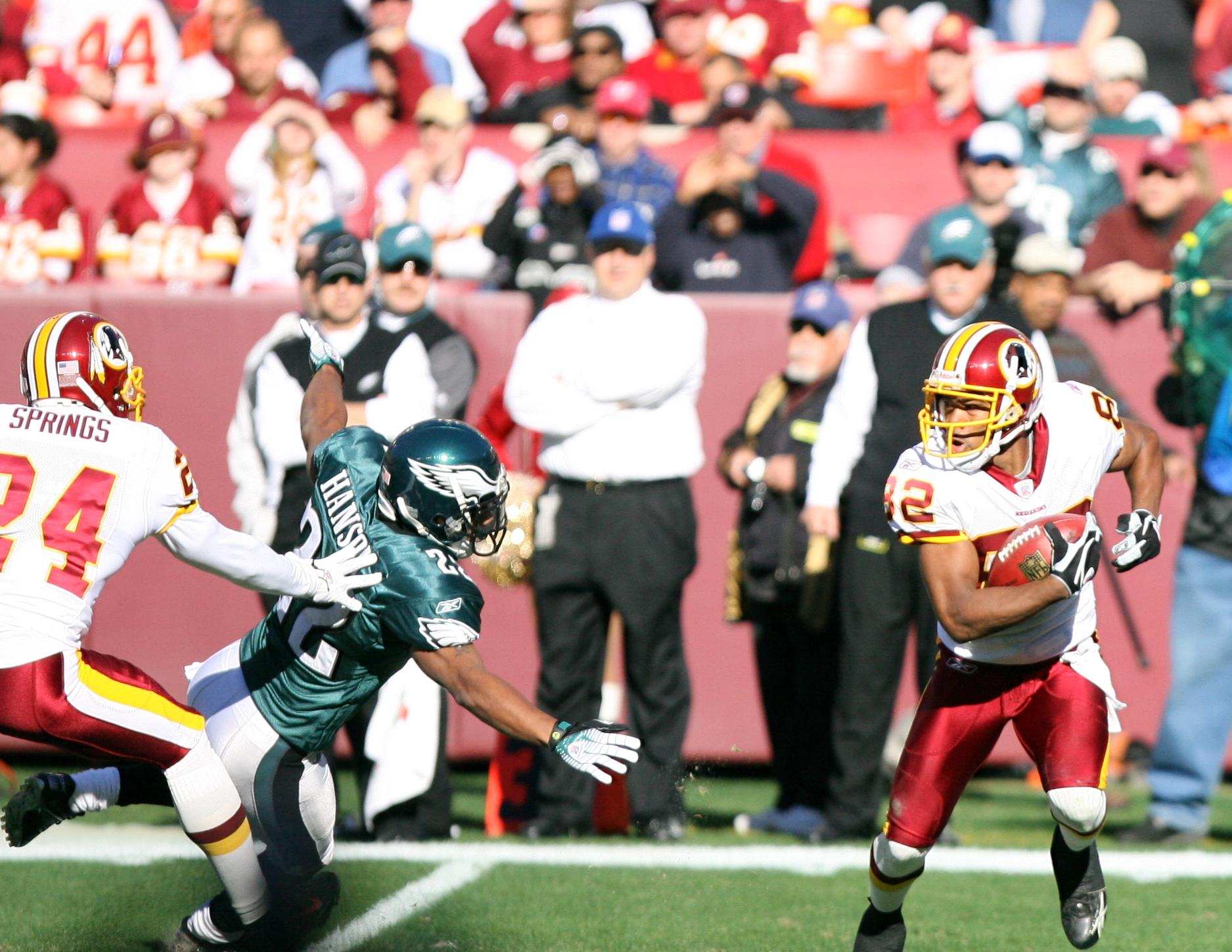
The Redskins on offense

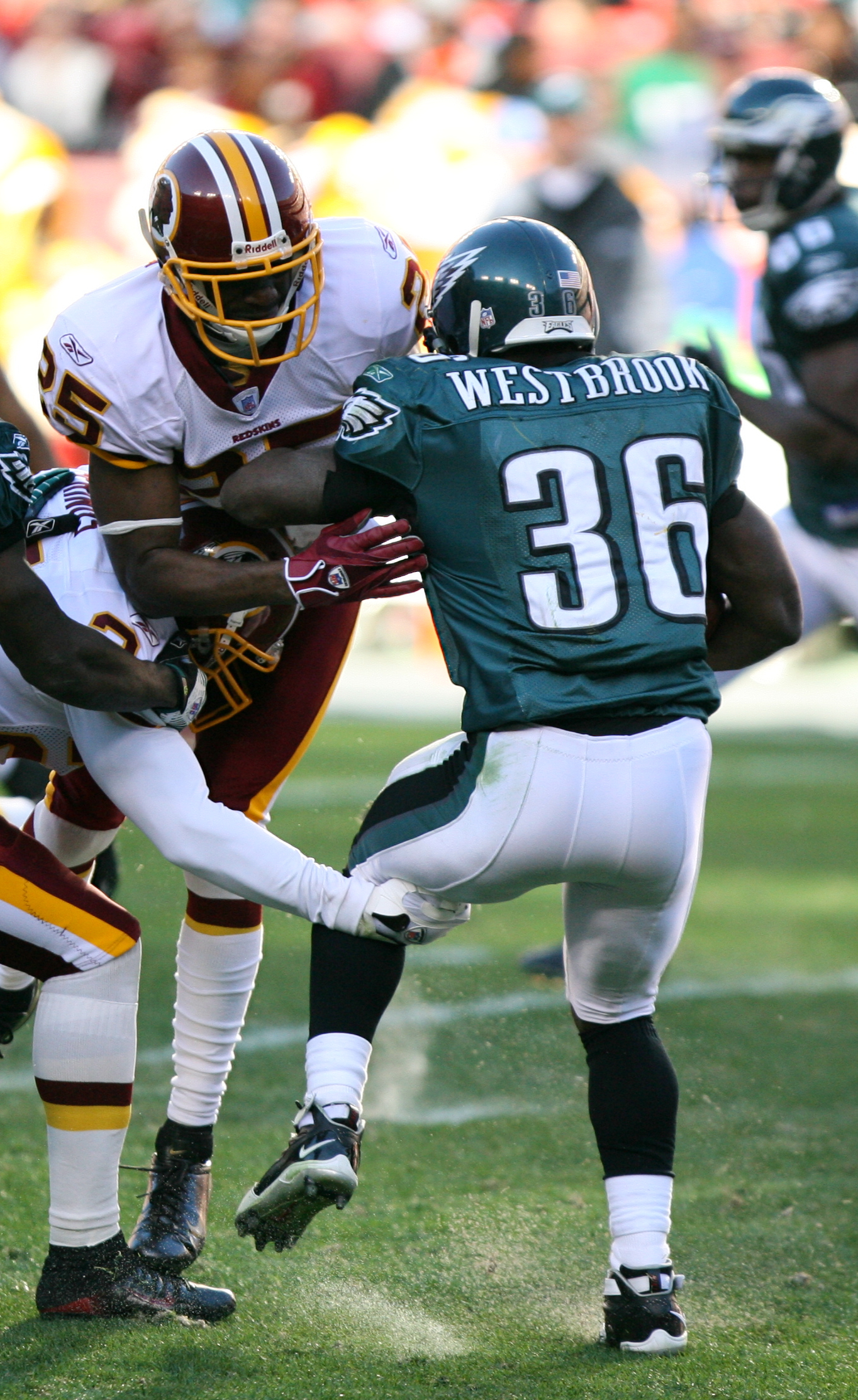
Washington tackles Brian Westbrook

==== Week 15: at New York Giants ====
	1	2	3	4	Total
**Eagles**	7	7	0	22	**36**
Giants	7	3	3	9	**22**

at Giants Stadium, East Rutherford, New Jersey

The Eagles met the New York Giants in a critical Week 15 matchup and were able to emerge from the Meadowlands with a 36–22 victory. Taking advantage of field position placing them at the Eagles' 21 yard-line, New York's Tiki Barber scored an 11-yard rushing touchdown. After allowing their customary opening score, the Eagles tied the game with a 12-play drive capped by a Correll Buckhalter touchdown. The Eagles took a 14–7 lead in the second quarter when Brian Westbrook dove over the pile for a touchdown on fourth and goal from the Giants' 1-yard line. The Giants then quickly drove down the field to snag a 47-yard Jay Feely field goal right before the end of the first half. After a David Akers field goal miss in the third quarter, Eli Manning connected with Plaxico Burress for 52 yards, leading to another field goal. A Will Demps sack of Jeff Garcia created a turnover, leading to another New York field goal, giving them a 16–14 lead. Maligned Eagles' kick returner Reno Mahe's 64-yard kickoff return set up a 28-yard rushing touchdown by Westbrook, putting Philadelphia back on top 21–16. After having a questionable taunting penalty called against him, Garcia threw his first interception of the year, leading to a one-yard run by New York goal-line specialist Brandon Jacobs. The Eagles stuffed Tiki Barber on the two-point attempt, holding the Giants' lead to 22–21. Garcia led the Eagles down the field and passed to Reggie Brown for a 19-yard score with under 3 minutes left in regulation. Garcia then found tight end L.J. Smith for the two-point conversion, making it 29–22 Eagles. On the Giants' first play of their next possession, Eli Manning was hit as he threw by cornerback Sheldon Brown, allowing defensive end Trent Cole to gather the interception and return it for a game-clinching touchdown. Westbrook, who hit the 1,000 yard mark in the first quarter, rushed for 97 yards and two touchdowns, while safety Brian Dawkins led the defense with twelve tackles, two forced fumbles, and an interception. The hard-fought 36–22 win avenged the Eagles' Week 2 loss to the Giants, moved them up to 8–6 and, more importantly, putting them in a strong position to claim an NFC playoff berth.

==== Week 16: at Dallas Cowboys ====
	1	2	3	4	Total
**Eagles**	7	6	3	7	**23**
Cowboys	0	7	0	0	**7**

at Texas Stadium, Dallas, Texas

The amazing December turnaround of the Philadelphia Eagles continued with another road win over a division rival. Philadelphia's surprising 23–7 Christmas Day victory over the Dallas Cowboys was broadcast on national television and clinched a playoff spot. Jeff Garcia, who outshined fellow backup-turned starting quarterback Tony Romo, led the Eagles to scores on four of their first five possessions. Capping off their first drive, which took 7:12 off the clock, Garcia hit tight end Matt Schobel for a 25-yard touchdown. Cowboys' return man Miles Austin fumbled the ensuing kickoff to Quintin Mikell. However, Dallas cornerback Anthony Henry intercepted Garcia and the Cowboys drove to the Eagles' 1-yard line. From there, the Philadelphia defense stuffed Dallas goal-line back Marion Barber III on three straight plays. The ball turned over on downs and Garcia promptly found Donté Stallworth for a 39-yard gain. The drive finished with a David Akers field goal and the Eagles led 10–0. Romo and the Cowboys responded with a 14-yard touchdown pass to Terrell Owens, who only caught two passes for 23 yards on the game. With only :29 seconds left in the half, Garcia got the Eagles into field goal range, and David Akers connected on a 45-yarder to make it 13–7 as time expired. On the opening drive of the third quarter, Garcia beat a Dallas blitz and completed a 65-yard catch and run to L.J. Smith. Philadelphia finished the drive with another field goal and it was 16–7. Early in the fourth quarter, Brian Dawkins made an over the shoulder interception in front of Owens in the end zone. On a 6:57 drive that included ten running plays and broke the Cowboys' backs, Correll Buckhalter pounded it in from one yard out, increasing the lead to 23–7. Romo would throw another interception, this one to Lito Sheppard, and the Eagles' domination of the Dallas offense continued for the rest of the game. The Eagles ran the ball a whopping 42 times for 204 yards (with Brian Westbrook accounting for 122 of those yards), while Garcia and the passing game gained 238 yards. The defense recorded three sacks in addition to the two interceptions and held Dallas to a meager 201 total yards on their own turf. Philadelphia clinched a playoff berth, and now suddenly controlled the NFC East and could win the division with a win over the Atlanta Falcons or a Dallas loss. With another victory, the Eagles moved up to 9–6.

==== Week 17: vs. Atlanta Falcons ====
	1	2	3	4	Total
Falcons	7	3	0	7	**17**
**Eagles**	10	7	0	7	**24**

at Lincoln Financial Field, Philadelphia When it was announced that the Detroit Lions had hung on to beat the Dallas Cowboys a few minutes into the Eagles' regular season finale with the Atlanta Falcons, the game instantly became meaningless as the NFC East crown became clinched, and were locked in as the NFC's #3 seed. After the defense forced an Atlanta three-and-out, Jeff Garcia marched the Eagles to a 41-yard David Akers field goal. From there, Andy Reid began pulling Philadelphia starters from the game, leaving the contest in the hands of the Eagles' backup players. Michael Vick, playing in his last game before going to jail on dogfighting charges (and afterward becoming a Philadelphia Eagle himself), completed a short touchdown pass to Warrick Dunn, giving Atlanta the lead. Eagles quarterback A. J. Feeley responded with a drive capped with a 14-yard scoring pass to Matt Schobel. The Falcons tied the game at 10–10 with a field goal, but Feeley fired a touchdown to rookie receiver Jason Avant at the end of the half. Juqua Thomas sacked Vick in the third quarter and knocked him out of the game, but Atlanta backup Matt Schaub retied the game with a touchdown pass to Alge Crumpler. Feeley answered on the Eagles' first play of their next possession with an 89-yard touchdown pass to Hank Baskett, who ran a perfect route and escaped the Atlanta secondary on his way to the long score. Schaub got the Falcons in Eagles' territory twice late in the game, but the Philadelphia reserve defense, playing for pride, held them out of the end zone, preserving the 24–17 win. Feeley came off the bench to pass for 322 yards and three touchdowns, while Baskett had a breakout game with 177 receiving yards and a score. The win allowed the Eagles to finish their improbable turnaround by winning out, giving them a 10–6 record on the season, in addition to their division crown.

== Standings ==
=== Division ===
NFC East
	W	L	T	PCT	DIV	CONF	PF	PA	STK
^{(3)} Philadelphia Eagles	10	6	0	.625	5–1	9–3	398	328	W5
^{(5)} Dallas Cowboys	9	7	0	.563	2–4	6–6	425	350	L2
^{(6)} New York Giants	8	8	0	.500	4–2	7–5	355	362	W1
Washington Redskins	5	11	0	.313	1–5	3–9	307	376	L2

=== Conference ===
NFC
#	Team	Division	W	L	T	PCT	DIV	CONF	SOS	SOV	STK
Division leaders
1	Chicago Bears	North	13	3	0	.813	5–1	11–1	.430	.404	L1
2 (Note: New Orleans claimed the No. 2 seed over Philadelphia based on head-to-head victory.)	New Orleans Saints	South	10	6	0	.625	4–2	9–3	.461	.425	L1
3	Philadelphia Eagles	East	10	6	0	.625	5–1	9–3	.477	.450	W5
4	Seattle Seahawks	West	9	7	0	.563	3–3	7–5	.453	.382	W1
Wild cards
5	Dallas Cowboys	East	9	7	0	.563	2–4	6–6	.457	.438	L2
6 (Note: NY Giants finished ahead of Green Bay based on strength of victory, claiming the 6th and final playoff spot.) (Note: NY Giants and Green Bay finish ahead of Carolina and St. Louis based on conference records.)	New York Giants	East	8	8	0	.500	4–2	7–5	.520	.422	W1
Did not qualify for the postseason
7	Green Bay Packers	North	8	8	0	.500	5–1	7–5	.500	.383	W4
8 (Note: Carolina finished ahead of St. Louis based on head-to-head victory.)	Carolina Panthers	South	8	8	0	.500	5–1	6–6	.473	.469	W2
9	St. Louis Rams	West	8	8	0	.500	2–4	6–6	.465	.352	W3
10 (Note: San Francisco finished ahead of Atlanta based on strength of victory.)	San Francisco 49ers	West	7	9	0	.438	3–3	5–7	.500	.411	W1
11	Atlanta Falcons	South	7	9	0	.438	3–3	5–7	.457	.375	L3
12	Minnesota Vikings	North	6	10	0	.375	2–4	6–6	.488	.344	L3
13 (Note: Arizona finished ahead of Washington based on conference record.)	Arizona Cardinals	West	5	11	0	.313	4–2	5–7	.500	.425	L1
14	Washington Redskins	East	5	11	0	.313	1–5	3–9	.512	.513	L2
15	Tampa Bay Buccaneers	South	4	12	0	.250	0–6	2–10	.535	.422	L1
16	Detroit Lions	North	3	13	0	.188	0–6	2–10	.523	.479	W1
Tiebreakers (Note: When breaking ties for three or more teams under the NFL's rules, they are first broken within divisions, then comparing only the highest-ranked remaining team from each division.)

== Postseason ==
=== Schedule ===
Round	Date	Opponent (seed)	Result	Record	Venue	Recap
Wild Card	January 7, 2007	New York Giants (6)	W 23–20	1–0	Lincoln Financial Field	Recap
Divisional	January 13, 2007	at New Orleans Saints (2)	L 24–27	1–1	Louisiana Superdome	Recap

=== Game summaries ===
==== NFC Wild Card Playoffs: vs. (6) New York Giants ====
NFC Wild Card Playoffs: (6) New York Giants at (3) Philadelphia Eagles – Game summary

Quarter	1	2	3	4	Total
Giants	7	3	0	10	20
Eagles	0	17	3	3	23

at Lincoln Financial Field, Philadelphia, Pennsylvania

- Date: January 7
- Game time: 4:30 p.m. EST
- Game weather: 52 °F (11 °C), mostly cloudy
- Game attendance: 69,064
- Referee: Pete Morelli
- TV announcers (Fox): Joe Buck (play-by-play), Troy Aikman (color commentator), Pam Oliver, and Chris Myers (sideline reporters)

Game information

1st Quarter

- NYG – Plaxico Burress 17-yard pass from Eli Manning (Jay Feely kick), 11:44. Giants 7–0. Drive: 7 plays, 67 yards, 3:16.

2nd Quarter

- PHI – Brian Westbrook 49-yard run (David Akers kick), 14:11. Tied 7–7. Drive: 7 plays, 84 yards, 2:47.
- PHI – David Akers 19-yard field goal, 9:34. Eagles 10–7. Drive: 7 plays, 36 yards, 2:59.
- NYG – Jay Feely 20-yard field goal, 4:45. Tied 10–10. Drive: 11 plays, 78 yards, 4:49.
- PHI – Donté Stallworth 28-yard pass from Jeff Garcia (David Akers kick), 1:01. Eagles 17–10. Drive: 10 plays, 80 yards, 3:44.

3rd Quarter

- PHI – David Akers 48-yard field goal, 2:37. Eagles 20–10. Drive: 10 plays, 45 yards, 4:35.

4th Quarter

- NYG – Jay Feely 24-yard field goal, 14:49. Eagles 20–13. Drive: 7 plays, 65 yards, 2:47.
- NYG – Plaxico Burress 11-yard pass from Eli Manning (Jay Feely kick), 5:04. Tied 20–20. Drive: 13 plays, 80 yards, 7:09.
- PHI – David Akers 38-yard field goal, 0:00. Eagles 23–20. Drive: 10 plays, 46 yards, 4:57.

Top passers

- NYG – Eli Manning – 16/27, 161 yards, 2 TD, INT
- PHI – Jeff Garcia – 17/31, 153 yards, TD

Top rushers

- NYG – Tiki Barber – 26 rushes, 137 yards
- PHI – Brian Westbrook – 20 rushes, 141 yards, TD

Top receivers

- NYG – Plaxico Burress – 5 receptions, 89 yards, 2 TD
- PHI – Reggie Brown – 7 receptions, 73 yards

The red-hot Eagles hosted the 8–8 New York Giants in the Wild Card Round of the playoffs. The teams played twice during the season, splitting two games that were mostly dominated by the Eagles.

The Giants attacked the outside with Tiki Barber on the opening drive, and Eli Manning laced a touchdown pass to Plaxico Burress to give New York a 7–0 lead. The Eagles offense could not get going the rest of the quarter, while the Philadelphia defense held the Giants from scoring again despite good field position for New York. With things looking bleak, Brian Westbrook read his blocks and took a handoff 49 yards for a touchdown. After cornerback Sheldon Brown intercepted Manning, the Eagles took the ball to the Giants' 1-yard line, but settled for a field goal to take a 10–7 lead.

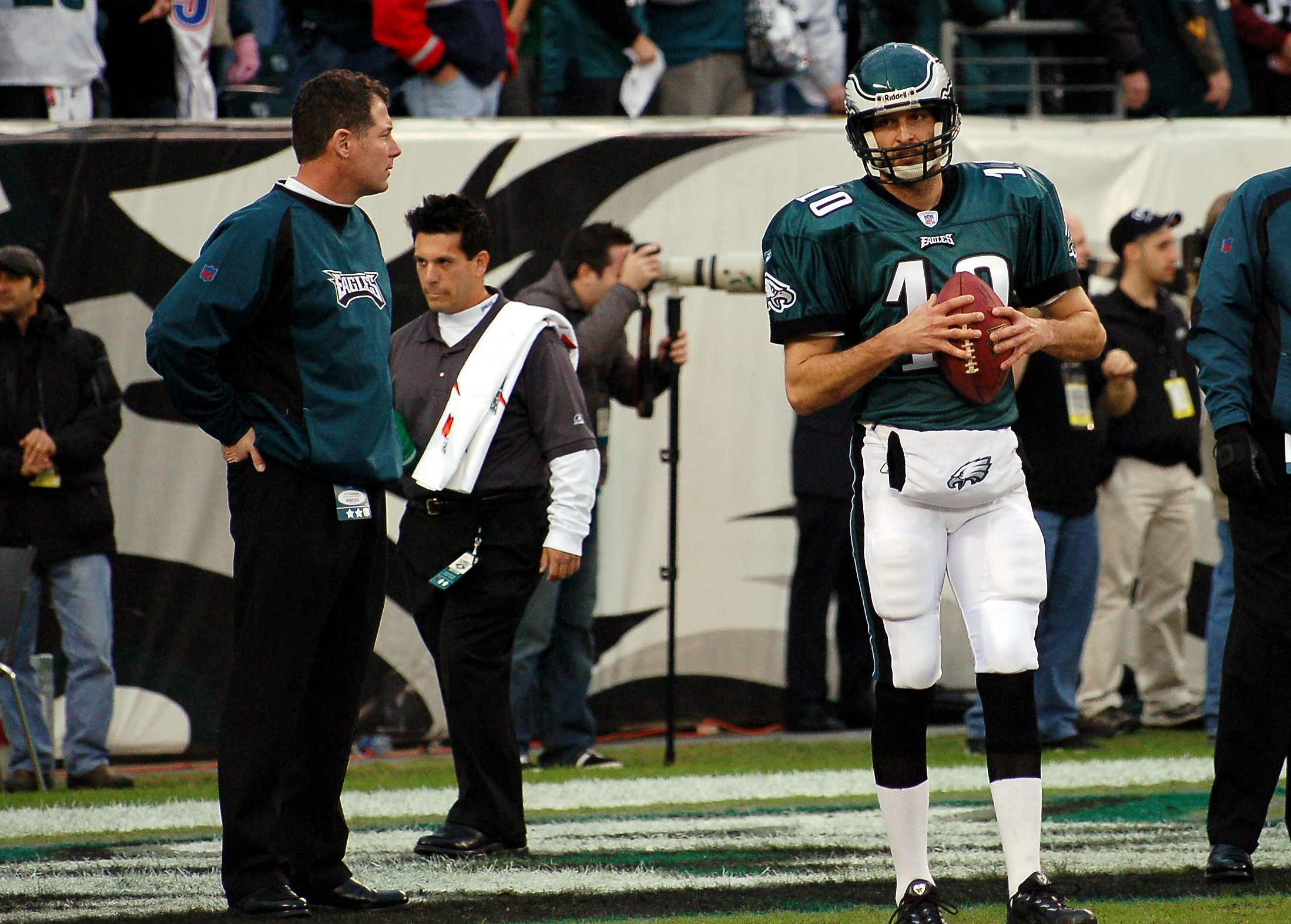
Quarterbacks coach Pat Shurmur and backup QB Koy Detmer before the game

A 41-yard Barber run set up a Jay Feely field goal to tie the game. Jeff Garcia responded by marching the Eagles on a ten-play drive that ended in a touchdown pass to Donte' Stallworth to take a 17–10 lead before halftime. In the third quarter, Westbrook, returning a punt, raced to the left side and scored a touchdown, but an illegal block call brought the play back. The Eagles instead put together another ten-play drive, this one ending in a season-long 48-yard field goal by David Akers.

Behind 20–10, an Eli Manning pass to Plaxico Burress drew a 47-yard pass interference penalty. New York got inside the Eagles' 5-yard line, but the defense held and the Giants settled for a field goal early in the fourth quarter. The Eagles continued to squander the lead, as the Giants put together an 80-yard, seven-minute drive on their next possession. The drive ended in an 11-yard touchdown to Burress, which tied the game at 20–20 with five minutes remaining. Westbrook and the Eagles then conducted a masterful "four-minute offense", getting into field goal range and burning the clock. As time expired, Akers booted a 38-yard game-winner. Westbrook had 141 rushing yards and a touchdown, while Barber had 137 yards for New York in his final game. Reggie Brown had seven catches for 73 yards, including several important catches for first downs. The negative for the Eagles was the loss of Pro Bowl cornerback Lito Sheppard to a dislocated elbow. It would be Andy Reid's last home playoff win as the Eagles head coach (and last home playoff win overall until 2018) and the team's final home playoff victory until 2017.

==== NFC Divisional Playoffs: at (2) New Orleans Saints ====
NFC Divisional Playoffs: (3) Philadelphia Eagles at (2) New Orleans Saints – Game summary

Quarter	1	2	3	4	Total
Eagles	0	14	7	3	24
Saints	3	10	14	0	27

at Louisiana Superdome, New Orleans, Louisiana

- Date: January 13
- Game time: 8:00 p.m. EST/7:00 p.m. CST
- Game weather: Played indoors, domed stadium
- Game attendance: 70,001
- Referee: Mike Carey
- TV announcers (Fox): Dick Stockton (play-by-play), Daryl Johnston (color commentator), and Tony Siragusa (sideline reporter)

Game information

1st Quarter

- NO – John Carney 33-yard field goal, 9:24. Saints 3–0. Drive: 5 plays, 35 yards, 2:05.

2nd Quarter

- NO – John Carney 23-yard field goal, 14:46. Saints 6–0. Drive: 6 plays, 59 yards, 1:33.
- PHI – Donté Stallworth 75-yard pass from Jeff Garcia (David Akers kick), 13:38. Eagles 7–6. Drive: 3 plays, 76 yards, 1:08.
- NO – Reggie Bush 4-yard run (John Carney kick), 5:19. Saints 13–7. Drive: 14 plays, 78 yards, 8:19.
- PHI – Brian Westbrook 1-yard run (David Akers kick), 0:50. Eagles 14–13. Drive: 11 plays, 80 yards, 4:29.

3rd Quarter

- PHI – Brian Westbrook 62-yard run (David Akers kick), 13:25. Eagles 21–13. Drive: 3 plays, 80 yards, 1:35.
- NO – Deuce McAllister 5-yard run (John Carney kick), 9:36. Eagles 21–20. Drive: 7 plays, 63 yards, 3:49.
- NO – Deuce McAllister 11-yard pass from Drew Brees (John Carney kick), 1:05. Saints 27–21. Drive: 9 plays, 84 yards, 6:21.

4th Quarter

- PHI – David Akers 24-yard field goal, 11:08. Saints 27–24. Drive: 9 plays, 64 yards, 4:50.

Top passers

- PHI – Jeff Garcia – 15/30, 240 yards, TD
- NO – Drew Brees – 20/32, 243 yards, TD

Top rushers

- PHI – Brian Westbrook – 26 rushes, 116 yards, 2 TD
- NO – Deuce McAllister – 21 rushes, 143 yards, TD

Top receivers

- PHI – Donte' Stallworth – 3 receptions, 100 yards, TD
- NO – Billy Miller – 4 receptions, 64 yards

Riding a six-game winning streak, the Eagles traveled to the Louisiana Superdome to face the NFC South champion New Orleans Saints. New Orleans had bested a Philadelphia team still led by Donovan McNabb 27–24 in Week 6. The Saints were rested and had what appeared to be the sympathy of the nation, but the Eagles brought greater playoff experience.

Cornerback Sheldon Brown set the tone early with a devastating hit on Saints' rookie star Reggie Bush on the first series. After trading punts on their opening drives, the No. 1 and No. 2 offenses in the league began to make some noise. A 28-yard run by Bush helped New Orleans take a 3–0 lead. In the second quarter, the Saints reached the Eagles' 5-yard line and added another field goal. The Eagles offense then awoke when Jeff Garcia heaved a 75-yard bomb to Donté Stallworth, the longest Philadelphia playoff touchdown play ever, giving the Eagles the lead. However, a 14-play Saints' drive ended in Bush racing around the right end for a 4-yard touchdown, and a 13–7 New Orleans lead. Garcia responded with big completions to Reggie Brown and Hank Baskett that got the Eagles in position for Brian Westbrook to dive over the pile from a yard out. A "Hail Mary pass" by Saints quarterback Drew Brees narrowly missed and the teams went to the locker room with Philadelphia leading 14–13.

On the Eagles' third play of their opening drive of the third quarter, Westbrook broke through and outran the New Orleans secondary, scoring a 62-yard touchdown, the longest playoff rushing touchdown in team history. The score was now 21–13 Philadelphia and visions of a fifth trip in six years to the NFC Championship Game became more real, but this was to be the Eagles' high-water mark. New Orleans running back Deuce McAllister scored short touchdowns (one rushing, one receiving) on the Saints' next two possessions, putting New Orleans back on top 27–21. The Eagles drove to the Saints 4-yard line on their next series, but could not get into the end zone, settling instead for a short David Akers field goal that left them behind 27–24 early in the fourth quarter. After punts by both teams, New Orleans got the ball back and began a drive that looked like it would run out the clock. However, Reggie Bush fumbled a pitch from Brees to end the five-minute drive, giving Philadelphia another shot with 3:18 remaining in the game. After the two-minute warning, Andy Reid decided to go for it on 4th and 10 with the Eagles on their own 44-yard line. The result was a completion to Baskett that would have been good for a first down, but right guard Scott Young (replacing the injured All-Pro Shawn Andrews), was flagged for a false start penalty. Despite only 1:56 remaining in the game, Reid elected to punt the ball back to New Orleans on the resulting 4th and 15. The Saints ran the ball for a first down and killed the clock, ending the Eagles' playoff run.

Westbrook ran for 116 yards and two scores, while McAllister had 163 all-purpose yards and two scores of his own for the Saints. Garcia threw for 240 yards, Stallworth had 100 yards receiving and a touchdown against his old team, and Reggie Brown added 76 receiving yards. The defense sacked Brees three times, but it was not enough to slow down the New Orleans offense.
