= Trent Cole =

American football player (born 1982)

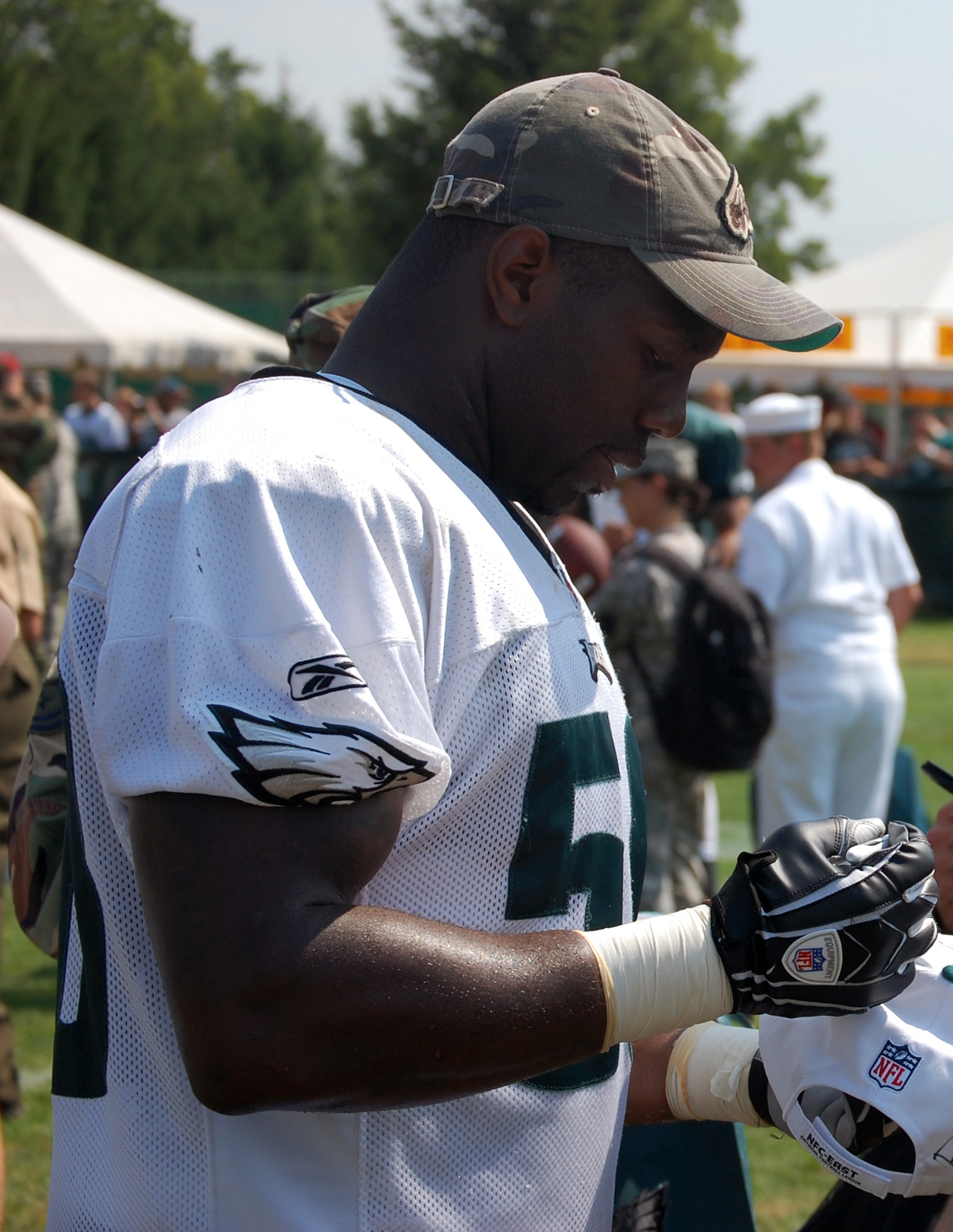
- Cole with the Philadelphia Eagles in 2008

No. 58
- Positions: Defensive end, linebacker

Personal information
- Born: October 5, 1982 (age 44); Xenia, Ohio, U.S.
- Listed height: 6 ft 3 in (1.91 m)
- Listed weight: 270 lb (122 kg)

Career information
- High school: Xenia
- College: Cincinnati (2001–2004)
- NFL draft: 2005: 5th round, 146th overall pick

Career history
- Philadelphia Eagles (2005–2014); Indianapolis Colts (2015–2016)

Awards and highlights
- Second-team All-Pro (2009); 2× Pro Bowl (2007, 2009); PFWA NFL All-Rookie Team (2005); Philadelphia Eagles Hall of Fame; 2× First-team All-C-USA (2003, 2004)

Career NFL statistics
- Total tackles: 617
- Sacks: 90.5
- Forced fumbles: 21
- Fumble recoveries: 3
- Pass deflections: 20
- Interceptions: 1
- Defensive touchdowns: 1
- Stats at Pro Football Reference

Trent James Cole Jr. (born October 5, 1982) is an American former professional football player who was a defensive end and linebacker for 12 seasons in the National Football League (NFL), primarily with the Philadelphia Eagles. Cole played college football for the Cincinnati Bearcats and was selected by the Eagles in the fifth round of the 2005 NFL draft, where he played with them from 2005 until 2014 and was a two-time Pro Bowler. He ended his career after two seasons with the Indianapolis Colts.

== Early life ==
Cole was born in Xenia, Ohio. He starred at Xenia High School, earning league and area Defensive Player of the Year honors after posting 121 tackles and 8 sacks as a senior. He also rushed for 1,241 yards and 10 touchdowns on his way to earning all-state honors, and played in the Ohio North-South all-star game. He lettered in basketball, track and baseball as well as football.

== College career ==
While attending the University of Cincinnati, Cole played for the Cincinnati Bearcats football team. He initially played nose tackle for the Bearcats. He was a two-time first-team All-Conference USA selection. Cole finished his career with 238 tackles, 19 sacks, 48 tackles for a loss, four forced fumbles, and two recovered fumbles. He started every game at weakside defensive end in 2004, totaling 68 tackles, 8.5 sacks, and 22 tackles for a loss (4th in nation). Also registered a safety and two blocked kicks. In 2002, he started nine games at defensive tackle before moving to defensive end and posted 86 tackles, five sacks, and 12 tackles for a loss, en route to Conference USA defensive newcomer of the year honors.

== Professional career ==
Pre-draft measurables
Height	Weight	40-yard dash	20-yard shuttle	Three-cone drill	Vertical jump	Broad jump	Bench press	Wonderlic
6 ft 2 1/4 in (1.89 m)	236 lb (107 kg)	4.70 s	4.22 s	6.98 s	38 in (0.97 m)	10 ft 4 in (3.15 m)	15 reps	14
All values from Cincinnati Pro Day, except Wonderlic which is from NFL Combine.

=== Philadelphia Eagles ===
==== 2005 ====
Cole was selected in the fifth round of the 2005 NFL draft by the Philadelphia Eagles with the draft pick acquired from the Washington Redskins for wide receiver James Thrash. He signed a 4-year contract before his rookie season.

Cole worked hard during training camp and his general athletic ability impressed many fans and people within the organization. He used this to forge a promising year, taking over the starting job at right defensive end in week 10. Cole tallied 5 sacks on the year, which was impressive considering he only started 3 games in the year. He added 26 tackles during his time as a starter to bring his total for the year to 38.

==== 2006 ====
With 5 sacks in his first 4 games, he was thought to start at the right end position, but with the signing of Darren Howard, Cole would only play on pass downs during the 2006 season. But this changed in week 2, two weeks after star left end Jevon Kearse went out with a fractured tibia, the Eagles announced that Cole would start for Kearse. Since then, Cole has had 1.5 sacks, 26 tackles, 18 of them solo tackles, helping the Philadelphia Eagles carry themselves to 5 straight wins and an NFC East title. Cole was First-team All-Rookie team honors by NFL.com, Pro Football Weekly after the season.

Cole signed a five-year contract extension on November 6, 2006, worth $26–28 million with a $12 million guarantee, which could keep him with the Eagles until 2013.

On December 17, 2006, against the New York Giants, Cole recorded the first interception and touchdown of his career. This interception gave the Eagles a 14-point lead with under 3 minutes left. The touchdown by Cole sealed the Eagles win 36–22. He ended the season with a career-high 8 sacks. Also led the defensive line with a career-high 84 tackles and his interception.

==== 2007 ====
Cole recorded 12.5 sacks in the 2007 season which broke his personal single-season record. He was the first defensive end since Clyde Simmons in 1986 to make the Pro Bowl as an Eagles draft pick. Cole is already 15th in team history in sacks. As impressive are his tackling numbers, his 70 tackles also put him first among all defensive ends in the NFC. On January 24, 2008, it was announced that he would be replacing Patrick Kerney in the 2008 Pro Bowl.

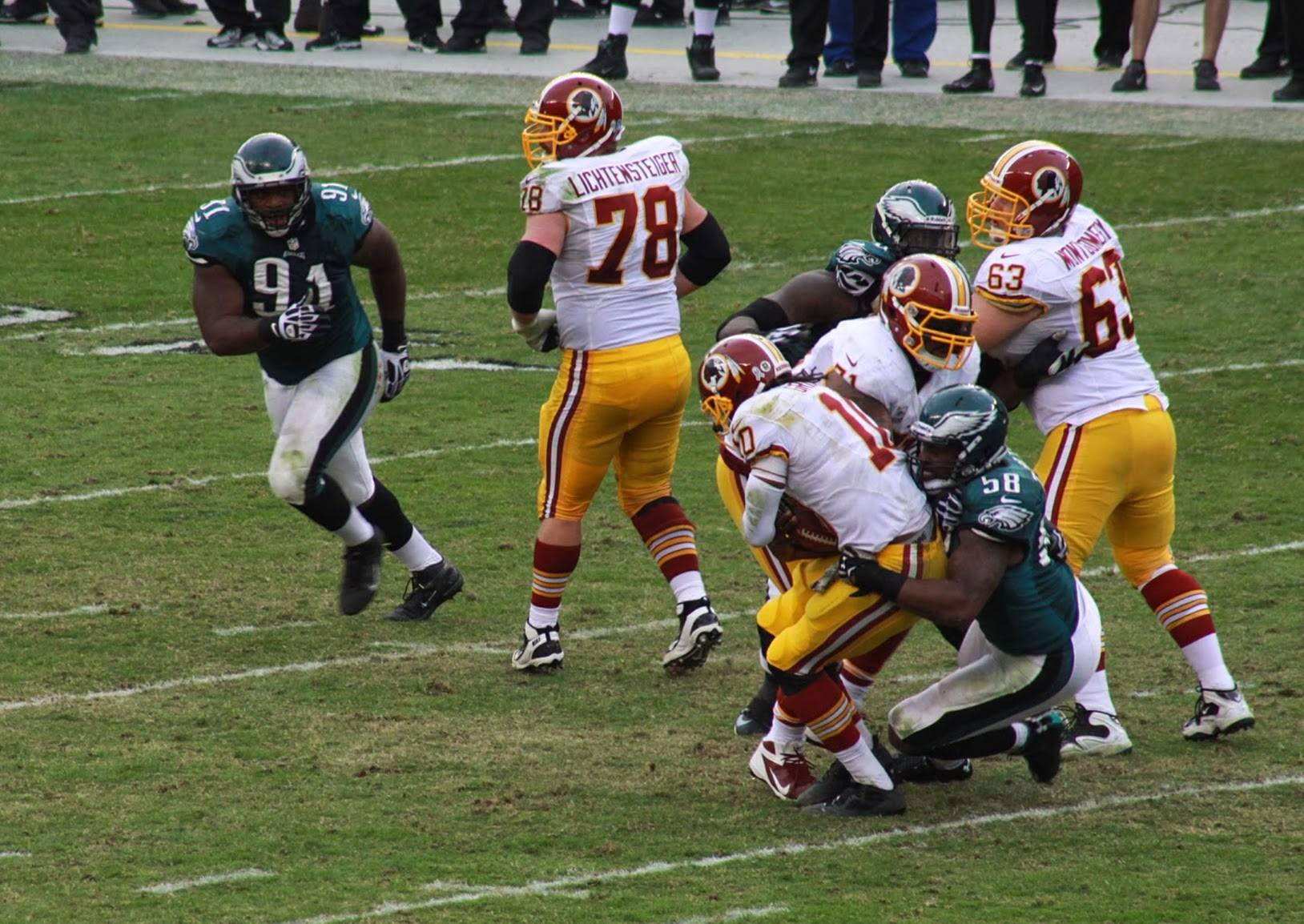
Cole sacks Redskins quarterback Robert Griffin III during the Eagles' 24–16 victory on November 17, 2013.

==== 2008−2012 ====
In 2008 Cole led the team in hurries (22), and TFLs (9), was 2nd in sacks (9.0), and 3rd with 3 FFs while making 98 tackles (59 solo). He was named to the USA Today 2008 All-Joe Team for the 3rd consecutive season, which honors the NFL players whose work does not necessarily garner headlines, but is integral to the success of their football team.

In week 15 of the 2009 NFL season, Cole was disqualified with 8 seconds remaining in a game against the New York Giants for throwing punches at Giants' offensive lineman Shaun O'Hara. Both Cole and O'Hara were fined $15,000 by the NFL. Cole was selected to the 2010 Pro Bowl as a reserve. He was ranked 73rd by his fellow players on the NFL Top 100 Players of 2011.

In week 1 of the 2011 NFL season, against the St. Louis Rams, Cole had 3 tackles and 1 sack. Over the season, Cole had 44 tackles, 1 force fumble and 11 sacks.

Cole signed a four-year contract extension with the Eagles worth up to $55.25 million on March 14, 2012, extending his contract through the 2017 season. Cole's season was below par for him, as he only recorded 3 sacks and 40 combined tackles, an all-time low in each category.

==== 2013−2014 ====
Under new coach Chip Kelly, who used a base 3-4 formation instead of Reid's 4-3 defense, Cole transitioned from right defensive end to right outside linebacker. Cole's performance improved and he became one of the team's most dominant defenders. Cole led the team in sacks (8.0) and forced fumbles (3), while also recording 56 combined tackles, 3 pass deflections, and his first career safety. He added 5 tackles, 1 pass deflection, and 1 sack in a 26-24 postseason loss against the New Orleans Saints. This season was followed by another productive year, with 52 tackles and 6.5 sacks in 15 games, although the Eagles missed the playoffs that year.

Cole was released by the Eagles on March 4, 2015. He left Philadelphia with the second most sacks in team history, with 85.5 to Reggie White's 124.

=== Indianapolis Colts ===
==== 2015 ====
On March 10, 2015, Cole signed a 2-year, $16 million contract with the Indianapolis Colts.

Cole played and started all 14 games he played in; however, he was criticized for a lack of production, most notably a career low 32 tackles and an inability to get to the quarterback. Cole began to increase his production towards the end of the season, gaining 3 sacks and a forced fumble in his final 5 games.

==== 2016 ====
Cole restructured his deal on March 8, 2016. On September 27, 2016, he was placed on injured reserve with a back injury. He was activated to the active roster off injured reserve on December 1, 2016.

=== Retirement ===
On December 22, 2017, Cole announced that he would retire as an Eagle, and was made an honorary captain for the team's game against the Oakland Raiders on Christmas Day.

== NFL career statistics ==
Legend
**Bold**	Career high

=== Regular season ===
Year	Team	Games		Tackles						Interceptions					Fumbles	
Year	Team	GP	GS	Cmb	Solo	Ast	Sck	Sfty	PD	Int	Yds	Avg	Lng	TD	FF	FR
2005	PHI	15	7	46	38	8	5.0	0	2	0	0	0	0	0	1	0
2006	PHI	16	14	62	43	19	8.0	0	**3**	**1**	**19**	**19.0**	**19T**	**1**	1	**1**
2007	PHI	16	16	70	49	**21**	**12.5**	0	2	0	0	0	0	0	**4**	**1**
2008	PHI	16	16	**77**	**59**	18	9.0	0	2	0	0	0	0	0	2	0
2009	PHI	16	16	57	48	9	**12.5**	0	0	0	0	0	0	0	2	0
2010	PHI	15	15	65	50	15	10.0	0	2	0	0	0	0	0	1	0
2011	PHI	14	14	44	41	3	11.0	0	1	0	0	0	0	0	1	0
2012	PHI	16	16	40	24	16	3.0	0	1	0	0	0	0	0	1	**1**
2013	PHI	16	16	56	44	12	8.0	**1**	**3**	0	0	0	0	0	3	0
2014	PHI	15	15	52	40	12	6.5	0	0	0	0	0	0	0	3	0
2015	IND	14	14	32	20	12	3.0	0	**3**	0	0	0	0	0	2	0
2016	IND	7	4	16	11	5	2.0	0	1	0	0	0	0	0	0	0
Career		176	157	617	456	150	90.5	1	20	1	19	19.0	19	1	21	3

=== Postseason ===
Year	Team	Games		Tackles				
Year	Team	GP	GS	Cmb	Solo	Ast	Sck	PD
2006	PHI	2	2	12	9	3	0.5	0
2008	PHI	3	3	**23**	**15**	**8**	**1.0**	**1**
2009	PHI	1	1	4	3	1	0	0
2010	PHI	1	1	3	2	1	0	0
2013	PHI	1	1	5	5	0	**1.0**	**1**
Total		8	8	47	34	13	2.5	2

== Personal life ==
Due to his off season hobby of hunting game, Cole has been nicknamed "The Hunter." He is the cousin of basketball player Norris Cole.
