= Donté Stallworth =

American football player (born 1980)

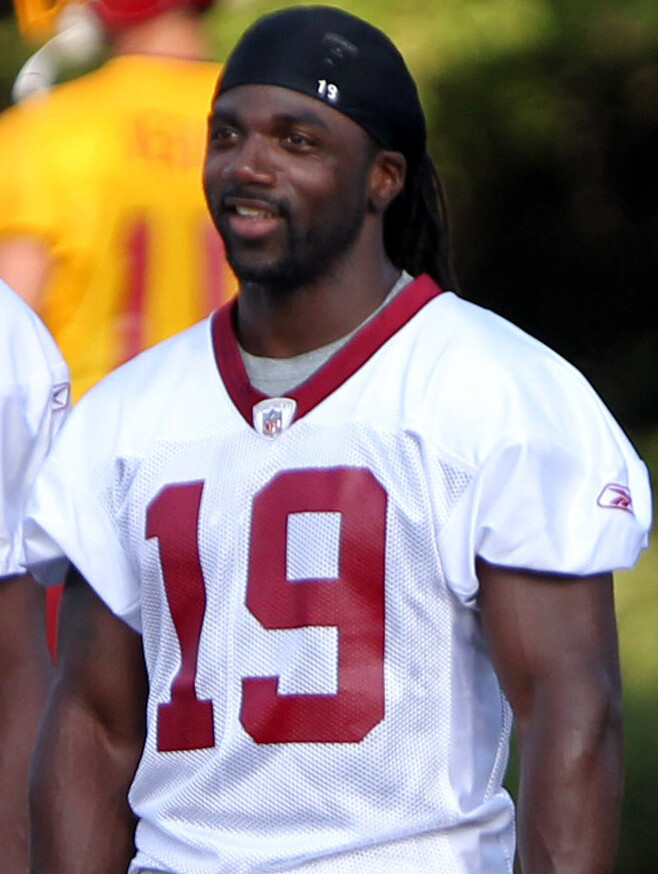
- Stallworth with the Washington Redskins in 2011

No. 83, 18, 19
- Position: Wide receiver

Personal information
- Born: November 10, 1980 (age 46); Sacramento, California, U.S.
- Listed height: 6 ft 0 in (1.83 m)
- Listed weight: 220 lb (100 kg)

Career information
- High school: Grant Union (Sacramento)
- College: Tennessee (1998–2001)
- NFL draft: 2002: 1st round, 13th overall pick

Career history
- New Orleans Saints (2002–2005); Philadelphia Eagles (2006); New England Patriots (2007); Cleveland Browns (2008–2009); Baltimore Ravens (2010); Washington Redskins (2011); New England Patriots (2012); Washington Redskins (2013)*
- * Offseason or practice squad member only

Awards and highlights
- PFWA All-Rookie Team (2002); Second-team All-SEC (2001)

Career NFL statistics
- Receptions: 321
- Receiving yards: 4,837
- Receiving touchdowns: 35
- Stats at Pro Football Reference

Donté Lamar Stallworth (born November 10, 1980) is an American former professional football player who was a wide receiver for ten seasons in the National Football League (NFL). He played college football for the Tennessee Volunteers and was selected by the New Orleans Saints in the first round of the 2002 NFL draft.

Stallworth also played for the Philadelphia Eagles, New England Patriots, Cleveland Browns, Baltimore Ravens, and Washington Redskins.

== Early life ==
Stallworth was born in Sacramento, California. He attended Grant Union High School in Sacramento, California where he was a star in football and track and field, PR of 10.49 seconds in the 100 meters and 7.16 meters in long jump. He was a high school teammate of former Minnesota Vikings running back Onterrio Smith and Tampa Bay Buccaneers wide receiver Paris Warren.

== College career ==
Stallworth played college football at the University of Tennessee for the Volunteers, where his nickname was "Hands," as his teammates watched his ability to come up with difficult catches on a regular basis. In consecutive weeks in the 2001 season, Stallworth had games with three receiving touchdowns in each, one against Memphis and one against Kentucky. In the following game against Vanderbilt, he had a 55-yard punt return for a touchdown. In the 2001 season, he had 41 receptions for 821 yards and ten touchdowns.

== Professional career ==
Pre-draft measurables
Height	Weight
6 ft 0 1/8 in (1.83 m)	197 lb (89 kg)
Values from NFL Combine

=== New Orleans Saints ===
Stallworth was selected by the New Orleans Saints in the first round (13th overall) of the 2002 NFL draft. He made his NFL debut versus the Tampa Bay Buccaneers on September 8 and had four receptions for 63 yards and a touchdown. He caught a touchdown in his first four career games, becoming the first player to do so in 20 seasons. He caught eight touchdown passes in 2002, his rookie year, but saw less action the next season. As a full-time starter in 2004, he had 767 receiving yards and five touchdowns. In 2005, he recorded a career-high 70 receptions for 945 yards with seven touchdowns.

=== Philadelphia Eagles ===
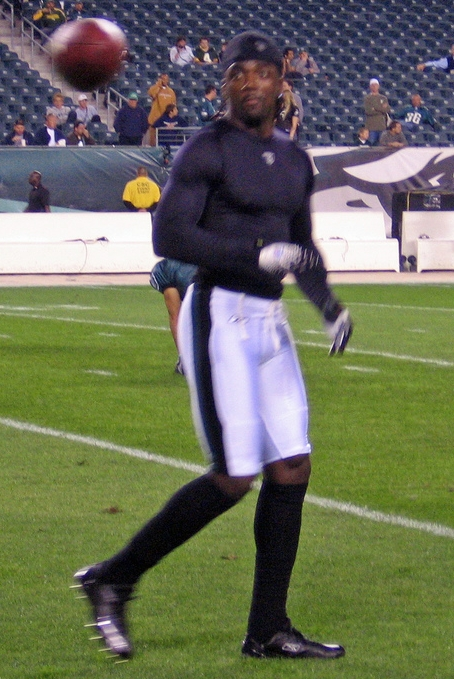
Stallworth during his season with the Eagles.

On August 28, 2006, Stallworth was traded to the Philadelphia Eagles for linebacker Mark Simoneau and a conditional fourth round pick in the 2007 NFL draft. In Stallworth's first game with the Eagles, less than two weeks after the trade, he caught six passes for 141 yards and a touchdown. Due to a nagging hamstring injury, he missed three games early in the regular season, but finished the year with 725 yards and five touchdowns. He caught a touchdown in each of the Eagles' postseason games that season.

In March 2007, The Philadelphia Inquirer reported that Stallworth was in the league substance abuse program.

=== New England Patriots (first stint) ===
On March 11, 2007, Stallworth agreed to terms with the New England Patriots on a reported six-year deal worth $30 million with $3.5 million guaranteed. The contract was incentive laden, meaning that the Patriots could release him if he underperformed for a small fraction of the full contract. Stallworth was a member of the famous 2007 Patriots, who went 16–0 in the regular season before losing in Super Bowl XLII to the New York Giants. He had three receptions for 34 yards in the Super Bowl. He finished the 2007 season with 46 receptions for 697 yards and three touchdowns. On February 22, 2008, the Patriots declined the option on his contract and he became a free agent.

=== Cleveland Browns ===
On March 1, 2008, Stallworth signed a seven-year, $35 million deal with the Cleveland Browns. However, he had just 17 catches for 170 yards and one touchdown for the Browns in 2008 and then missed the entire 2009 season after being suspended by the NFL following his conviction on manslaughter charges. On February 8, 2010, after being reinstated by the NFL, the Browns terminated Stallworth's contract.

=== Baltimore Ravens ===
On February 16, 2010, Stallworth signed a one-year, $900,000 deal with the Baltimore Ravens.

On August 28, 2010, Stallworth broke his foot in a preseason game against the New York Giants. Head Coach John Harbaugh stated that this injury was not season-ending and Stallworth would be back after the Ravens' bye week. Stallworth made his return to the field in November.

On December 23, 2010, Stallworth was voted by his teammates and awarded the Ed Block Courage Award for 2010.

=== Washington Redskins (first stint) ===
Stallworth signed a one-year deal with the Washington Redskins on July 29, 2011. On November 8, 2011, Stallworth was released and put on waivers. On November 15, 2011, he re-signed with the Redskins after wide receiver, Leonard Hankerson, and defensive end, Kedric Golston, were put on injured reserve. After his return to the team, Stallworth would catch a touchdown pass in the endzone in Week 11 against the Dallas Cowboys allowing the Redskins to go into overtime. At the end of 2011 season, Stallworth recorded 22 receptions, 309 receiving yards, and two touchdowns.

=== New England Patriots (second stint) ===
On March 19, 2012, Stallworth signed with the New England Patriots. On August 27, 2012, Stallworth was released by Patriots. On December 3, 2012, Stallworth re-signed with the Patriots because of a broken right foot suffered by wide receiver Julian Edelman and lack of depth at the wide receiver position. On December 11, it was reported that Stallworth was placed on injured reserve with an ankle injury after only playing in one game during his brief return and making a 63-yard reception for a touchdown.

=== Washington Redskins (second stint) ===
Stallworth re-signed with the Redskins on June 12, 2013. On August 26, 2013, Stallworth was waived by the Redskins.

== NFL career statistics ==
Year	Team	GP	Receiving							Fumbles	
Year	Team	GP	Rec	Tgt	Yds	Avg	Lng	TD	FD	Fum	Lost
2002	NO	13	42	69	594	14.1	57	8	26	0	0
2003	NO	11	25	55	485	19.4	76	3	19	1	1
2004	NO	16	58	106	767	13.2	45	5	35	0	0
2005	NO	16	70	129	945	13.5	43	7	50	0	0
2006	PHI	12	38	70	725	19.1	84	5	30	0	0
2007	NE	16	46	75	697	15.2	69	3	27	0	0
2008	CLE	11	17	45	170	10.0	19	1	8	0	0
2010	BAL	8	2	5	82	41.0	67	0	2	0	0
2011	WAS	11	22	38	309	14.0	51	2	15	0	0
2012	NE	1	1	2	63	63.0	63	1	1	0	0
Career		115	321	594	4,837	15.1	84	35	213	1	1

== Journalism ==
In September 2014, Stallworth was hired by The Huffington Post for a six-month fellowship covering national security politics full-time, based in the company's Washington, D.C., office. Although the fellowship lasted six months, Stallworth expressed hope that he would be hired permanently. In 2016 Stallworth was hired by Daveed Gartenstein-Ross at Valens Global as a Strategy Consultant. Stallworth's work at Valens focuses on securing and hardening public venues against terror attacks.

== Personal life ==
=== DUI manslaughter charges ===
On the morning of March 14, 2009, Stallworth struck and killed a pedestrian while driving his car at the eastern end of the MacArthur Causeway in Miami Beach, Florida.

Around 7:15 a.m., Stallworth was headed toward the beach, driving a black 2005 Bentley Continental GT about 50 mph in a 40 mph zone, according to a Miami Beach Police report. Mario Reyes, 59, was on the busy causeway, trying to catch a bus home after finishing his shift. Stallworth claims that he flashed his car's headlights to warn Reyes. Stallworth struck Reyes with his car, killing him.

In a police investigation, Stallworth admitted to drinking the night before the accident. News sources reported that his blood alcohol content was 0.12, over the legal limit of 0.08.

On April 1, 2009, Stallworth was charged with DUI manslaughter; he surrendered to police on April 2, 2009, and was released on $200,000 bail. Under a plea deal, he received a sentence of 30 days in the county jail, plus 1,000 hours of community service, two years of community control, and eight years' probation. His Florida state driver's license was permanently suspended. On July 10, 2009, Stallworth was released from county jail after serving 24 days of a 30-day sentence.

The Associated Press reported on June 16, 2009, that Stallworth and the Reyes family reached a financial agreement, avoiding a civil lawsuit. The amount of the settlement was not disclosed.

On August 13, 2009, NFL commissioner Roger Goodell said Stallworth would be suspended for the 2009 season without pay. Stallworth was reinstated after Super Bowl XLIV.

A Yahoo! Sports story reported that Stallworth's lawyers claimed he could have fought all charges, but that Stallworth chose to be convicted of a felony.

=== Hot Air Balloon injury ===
Stallworth was hospitalized with serious burns on March 16, 2013, after the hot air balloon carrying him and two other people crashed into power lines above South Florida.
