= Jevon Kearse =

American football player (born 1976)

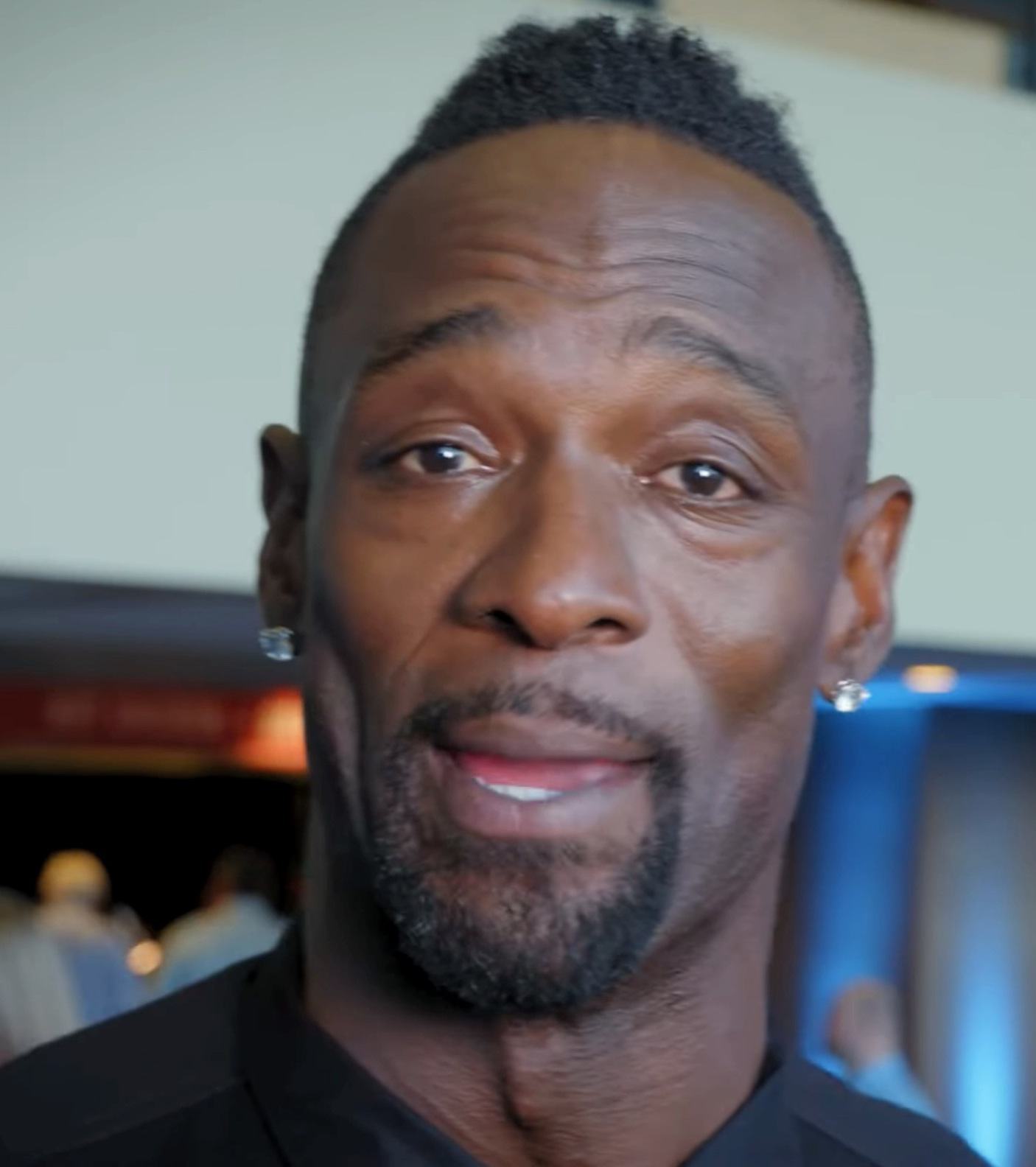
- Kearse in 2022

No. 90, 93
- Position: Defensive end

Personal information
- Born: September 3, 1976 (age 50); Fort Myers, Florida, U.S.
- Listed height: 6 ft 5 in (1.96 m)
- Listed weight: 265 lb (120 kg)

Career information
- High school: North Fort Myers (North Fort Myers, Florida)
- College: Florida (1995–1998)
- NFL draft: 1999: 1st round, 16th overall pick

Career history
- Tennessee Titans (1999–2003); Philadelphia Eagles (2004–2007); Tennessee Titans (2008–2009)

Awards and highlights
- NFL Defensive Rookie of the Year (1999); First-team All-Pro (1999); 3× Pro Bowl (1999–2001); NFL forced fumbles co-leader (1999); PFWA All-Rookie Team (1999); National champion (1996); First-team All-American (1998); SEC Defensive Player of the Year (1998); 2× First-team All-SEC (1997, 1998); Florida–Georgia Hall of Fame; NFL record: Most sacks in a season by a rookie: 14.5 (1999)

Career NFL statistics
- Total tackles: 313
- Sacks: 74
- Forced fumbles: 26
- Fumble recoveries: 4
- Interceptions: 1
- Defensive touchdowns: 1
- Stats at Pro Football Reference

Jevon Kearse (born September 3, 1976), is an American former professional football defensive end who played in the National Football League (NFL) for 11 seasons, primarily with the Tennessee Titans. Nicknamed "The Freak", he spent seven nonconsecutive seasons with the Titans and four with the Philadelphia Eagles in between. He played college football for the Florida Gators, winning the 1997 Sugar Bowl and earning All-American honors and SEC Defensive Player of the Year in 1998. Kearse was selected by the Titans in the first round of the 1999 NFL draft.

In his first season, Kearse set the NFL record for rookie sacks, earning him NFL Defensive Rookie of the Year. Kearse was also a member of the team that made the franchise's Super Bowl debut in Super Bowl XXXIV and received three consecutive Pro Bowl selections. Following his first five years in Tennessee, he played the Eagles from 2004 to 2007 and appeared in Super Bowl XXXIX. He rejoined the Titans for his final two seasons.

== Early life ==
Jevon Kearse was born on September 3, 1976, in Fort Myers, Florida. He went to North Fort Myers High School, where he played football for the Red Knights. Even as a high-schooler, Kearse stood over 6 feet tall, was incredibly agile, and managed to pack on muscle while keeping his speed and quickness. Under head coach Wade Hummel, he started drawing serious attention from college recruiters. Kearse played both strong safety and tight end. In his very first season on the varsity team, he returned four kicks for touchdowns.

== College career ==
Starting college at 6 feet, 4 inches tall, and 215 pounds, Kearse was projected as either a linebacker or defensive back. He accepted an athletic scholarship to attend the University of Florida in Gainesville, Florida, where he played for coach Steve Spurrier's Florida Gators football team from 1995 to 1998. He began his college career at safety before shifting to outside linebacker in 1996. Later in his college career, he would occasionally line up at defensive end during obvious passing situations to intensify the Gators' pass rush.

The Gators coaches red-shirted Kearse for the 1995 season, and he watched the Gators' run for the 1995 national championship game from the sidelines. The Gators lost to the Nebraska Cornhuskers 62–24 in the national championship game, marking Florida's only loss of the season. He was nicknamed "the Freak" by Southeastern Conference (SEC) opponents during the Gators' 1996 season when it became apparent his devastating combination of size and speed made him a challenge for opposing offenses. In his debut game against Southwest Louisiana, he accounted for six solo tackles and a sack. The Florida Gators would go on to win the national title, defeating Florida State Seminoles 52–20 in the 1997 Sugar Bowl. For his on-field accomplishments, Kearse was named to the All-SEC Freshman team. In a tragic counterpoint, his younger brother Jermaine was killed in a drive-by-shooting following the season.

Kearse made the All-SEC team in 1997 for the first time by registering a team high 6.5 sacks during the regular season as well as 38 tackles and two forced fumbles. In his 1998 campaign, he once again led the team with 7.5 sacks and also improved his tackles tally to 54. He was named All-SEC again and earned the AP SEC Defensive Player of the Year that season, as well as making the list of several different All-American teams, and was a finalist for the Butkus Award, Lombardi Award, and Chuck Bednarik college defensive player of the year award.

He opted to forgo his final season of eligibility, stating, "I think I've accomplished the four goals I wanted to when I attended the University of Florida: To become a better person, to win a national championship, to get an education and finally to have a chance to play in the NFL."

During his college career, Kearse made 34.5 tackles for a loss, finishing eleventh on the Gators' all-time list. He also compiled 145 total tackles, 16.5 quarterback sacks, six forced fumbles, one interception, one recovered fumble, and 19 pass deflections. In an article series written for The Gainesville Sun in 2006, the Sun sportswriters ranked him as #16 among the top 100 greatest Gators from the first 100 years of Florida football.

== Professional career ==
=== Pre-draft ===
Pre-draft measurables
Height	Weight	Arm length	Hand span	40-yard dash	10-yard split	20-yard split	20-yard shuttle	Vertical jump	Broad jump
6 ft 4 7/8 in (1.95 m)	262 lb (119 kg)	34 1/4 in (0.87 m)	11 5/8 in (0.30 m)	4.43 s	1.61 s	2.67 s	4.24 s	37.0 in (0.94 m)	10 ft 2 in (3.10 m)
All values from NFL Combine, except dash from Pro Day

Kearse, at 262 pounds, ran a 4.58 second 40-yard dash, 4.24 second 20-yard shuttle, and had a vertical jump of 37 inches at the 1999 NFL Combine. Kearse lowered his 40-yard time to 4.43 at the University of Florida Pro Day in the spring of 1999.

=== Tennessee Titans: 1999–2003 ===
Kearse was drafted by the Tennessee Titans as the 16th pick of the first round. On July 28, 1999, he signed a five-year, $6.1 million contract; however, according to NFLPA records he earned incentives that increased Kearse's compensation in his first five years to nearly $9 million. He was the first player drafted by the Tennessee Titans; who had previously been the Houston Oilers.

In Kearse's debut game with the Titans, he helped them achieve a 36–35 win over the Cincinnati Bengals. Steve McNair had been injured, and with backup quarterback Neil O'Donnell in his place, Kearse helped lead the Titans to win the next four out of five games. In the first month of his NFL career, he was named NFL Defensive Rookie of the Month.

For all but one month of the season, he was named NFL Defensive Rookie of the Month, and ended up becoming NFL Defensive Rookie of the Year with the help of his rookie record-breaking performance with 14.5 sacks (which led the AFC) that year and forced eight fumbles, which also led the NFL. He also recorded 57 tackles and he batted away nine passes while also making seven of his tackles for losses. He accounted for two sacks (quarterback Rob Johnson) and two forced fumbles in the AFC wild card game vs. the Buffalo Bills. He was also credited with a safety in that game known as the "Music City Miracle." Kearse was also second in the balloting for the AP Defensive Player of the Year, losing out to Warren Sapp. He was a consensus All-Pro and was the first rookie defensive end in AFC history and the first rookie DE in the NFL since Detroit's Al "Bubba" Baker in 1978 to be named a Pro Bowl starter. That year, the Titans made it to Super Bowl XXXIV in which he started; however, they lost to the Kurt Warner-led St. Louis Rams.

The next season, Kearse accounted for fewer sacks (11.5) but stated that he was playing better than his rookie season. The Titans lost their Divisional playoff games to the Baltimore Ravens who ended up winning the Super Bowl that season. Kearse also lost the NFL Defensive Player of the Year award to Ray Lewis of the Baltimore Ravens. In addition, he totaled 53 tackles (six for losses), forced four fumbles, had six pass deflections, and was again voted to the Pro Bowl.

In 2001, Kearse moved from left defensive end to right defensive end as the Titans traded for Kevin Carter. Kearse responded well and recorded 10 sacks, forced three fumbles, batted two passes while recording 36 tackles. Kearse was voted to his third consecutive Pro Bowl with the Titans in 2001. In 2002, Kearse fractured the fifth metatarsal in his left foot on the second play from scrimmage against the Eagles in the season opener and was inactive for the next 12 games. Due to the injury Kearse recorded only two sacks, playing in only four games (starting one), as the Titans returned to the AFC championship game but lost to Oakland.

In 2003, Kearse recorded 9.5 sacks through the first nine games but was shut out the final seven games (he missed two due to a sprained ankle injury). He also played a key role on the 2003 Titans who made the playoffs and won their first-round game against Baltimore before losing a hard-fought divisional match against the eventual world champion New England Patriots.

=== Philadelphia Eagles: 2004–2007 ===
After his 2003 campaign, Kearse was unable to reach an agreement with the Titans after his contract expired, and thus became an unrestricted free agent. The Philadelphia Eagles signed Kearse to a record-breaking deal for a defensive lineman at the time; in all, the eight-year contract would pay Kearse $65 million, with a $16 million signing bonus.

Kearse played well with the Eagles in 2004, but his tackle and sack totals were not as high as he had previously achieved in his career with the Titans. He was, however, still a defensive force, and figured into the game plans of opposing offenses. During 2004, Philadelphia finished the season with a 13–3 record and earned home-field advantage throughout the playoffs. After eliminating the Minnesota Vikings and the Atlanta Falcons, the Eagles lost Super Bowl XXXIX 24–21 to the New England Patriots.

In 2005, Kearse had a solid year similar to the year before, yet his team fell to a 6–10 record. During the season, starters like Donovan McNabb, Brian Westbrook, Hank Fraley, Tra Thomas, Lito Sheppard, and others were out with injuries, and star wide receiver Terrell Owens was suspended from the team nine games into the season. He recorded 7.5 sacks for the second season in a row (also leading the Eagles in sacks for the second straight season), but in 2005 he batted down 8 passes and forced 3 fumbles.

2006 would be a short season for Kearse who recorded 3.5 sacks in the first two games of the season before a severe knee injury. It was feared that he tore several ligaments in his knee, as well as dislocating his kneecap, tearing his knee capsule, straining his quadriceps tendon, and injuring his hamstring, during an overtime game against the New York Giants in week 2 of the NFL season. When he went into surgery, however, doctors were surprised to see that almost everything in his knee was intact, except for a tear to the lateral meniscus cartilage and a fracture to his tibia. The injury was downgraded from possibly career-ending to just a 12-week recovery.

However, Kearse did not appear to have regained his burst on the line and, in light of substandard production, he lost his starting job to longtime teammate Juqua Thomas in Week 11 of the 2007 NFL season. Due to this lack of production, along with the expensive contract Kearse carried, many predicted that he would be cut by the start of the 2008 season. This speculation turned out to be well-founded; he was released by the team on February 28, 2008, voiding the final three years of his contract. In his four years with Philadelphia, Kearse earned nearly $29.2 million of his record-setting 2004 contract.

=== Tennessee Titans: 2008–2009 ===
On March 6, 2008, Kearse returned to the Titans by signing with the team as a free agent. Kearse signed a two-year, $6 million deal, with a $1.3 million signing bonus. He earned a total of $3 million in the first year. Kearse started all 16 games in 2008, finishing with 3.5 sacks. During the 2009 season, Jeff Fisher decided to bench Kearse for William Hayes.

== NFL career statistics ==
Year	Team	Games	Combined tackles	Tackles	Assisted tackles	Sacks	Forced fumbles	Fumble recoveries
1999	TEN	16	57	48	9	14.5	6	1
2000	TEN	16	52	36	16	11.5	4	0
2001	TEN	16	36	25	11	10.0	3	0
2002	TEN	4	4	3	1	2.0	0	0
2003	TEN	14	41	28	13	9.5	4	0
2004	PHI	14	31	26	5	7.5	2	1
2005	PHI	15	38	35	3	7.5	3	0
2006	PHI	2	4	3	1	3.5	1	0
2007	PHI	14	12	8	4	3.5	0	1
2008	TEN	16	34	27	7	3.5	3	0
2009	TEN	6	4	1	3	1.0	0	1
Career		133	313	240	73	74.0	26	4

== Personal life ==
Kearse has been a resident of Moorestown, New Jersey.

His nephew, Jayron Kearse, played football in the NFL.

== See also ==
- 1998 College Football All-America Team
- Florida Gators football, 1990–99
- History of the Tennessee Titans
- List of Florida Gators football All-Americans
- List of Florida Gators in the NFL draft
- List of Philadelphia Eagles players
