= LaJuan Ramsey =

American football player (born 1984)

No. 77, 99
- Position: Defensive tackle

Personal information
- Born: March 19, 1984 (age 42); Anniston, Alabama, U.S.
- Listed height: 6 ft 3 in (1.91 m)
- Listed weight: 300 lb (136 kg)

Career information
- High school: Dominguez (Compton, California)
- College: USC
- NFL draft: 2006: 6th round, 204th overall pick

Career history
- Philadelphia Eagles (2006–2007); San Francisco 49ers (2008)*; Indianapolis Colts (2008); Tennessee Titans (2009)*; St. Louis Rams (2009); Hartford Colonials (2010)*
- * Offseason or practice squad member only

Career NFL statistics
- Total tackles: 28
- Sacks: 1
- Forced fumbles: 1
- Interceptions: 1
- Stats at Pro Football Reference

LaJuan Ramsey (born March 19, 1984) is an American former professional football player who was a defensive tackle in the National Football League (NFL). He was selected by the Philadelphia Eagles in the sixth round of the 2006 NFL draft. He played college football for the USC Trojans. Ramsey was also a member of the San Francisco 49ers, Indianapolis Colts, Tennessee Titans, St. Louis Rams and Hartford Colonials.

== College career ==
He played college football at the University of Southern California. A four-year contributor at both defensive tackle and end for a USC football squad that compiled a 48–4 record and captured two NCAA Championships. He earned All-Pac-10 honorable mention as a senior, replacing current Eagle Mike Patterson (his former roommate). He started 11 games in 2005, posting 40 tackles, including 6.5 TFLs.

== Professional career ==
Pre-draft measureables
Ht	Wt	40-yard dash	10-yd split	20-yd split	20 ss	3-cone	Vert	Broad	BP	Wonderlic
6-2½ *	291 lb *	4.92 *	1.71 *	x	4.81 *	7.78 *	32 in. *	8'11" *	32	x

(* represents USC Pro Day)

=== Philadelphia Eagles ===
Ramsey was a sixth round draft pick (204th overall) of the Philadelphia Eagles in the 2006 NFL draft and saw action in six games as a reserve defensive tackle. He had one interception in his rookie season, which was against Green Bay in which he snared a tipped pass from Brett Favre.

Ramsey appeared in nine games for the Eagles the following season in 2007, recording nine tackles. In 2007 he set career high by appearing in nine contests and recorded nine tackles and one quarterback hurry. He was waived on June 13, 2008.

=== Indianapolis Colts ===
Ramsey was signed by the Indianapolis Colts on September 11, 2008. He appeared in four games for the Colts, recording six tackles, before his release on October 14.

=== St. Louis Rams ===
Ramsey was claimed off waivers by the St. Louis Rams on September 6, 2009. He played 15 games for the Rams with five starts. He totaled 16 tackles, one sack and one forced fumble. He was waived on March 4, 2010.

== Cooking career ==
After his playing career ended, Ramsey took up cooking at Morel's French Steakhouse & Bistro at The Grove in Los Angeles. He then participated in an episode of Chef Wanted with Anne Burrell, and was the winner of the episode after a strong dinner service. His reward for winning was being offered the job as the new executive chef at Christy Bono's restaurant, Christy's on Broadway. He ultimately declined the position.
