= Lito Sheppard =

American football player and coach (born 1981)

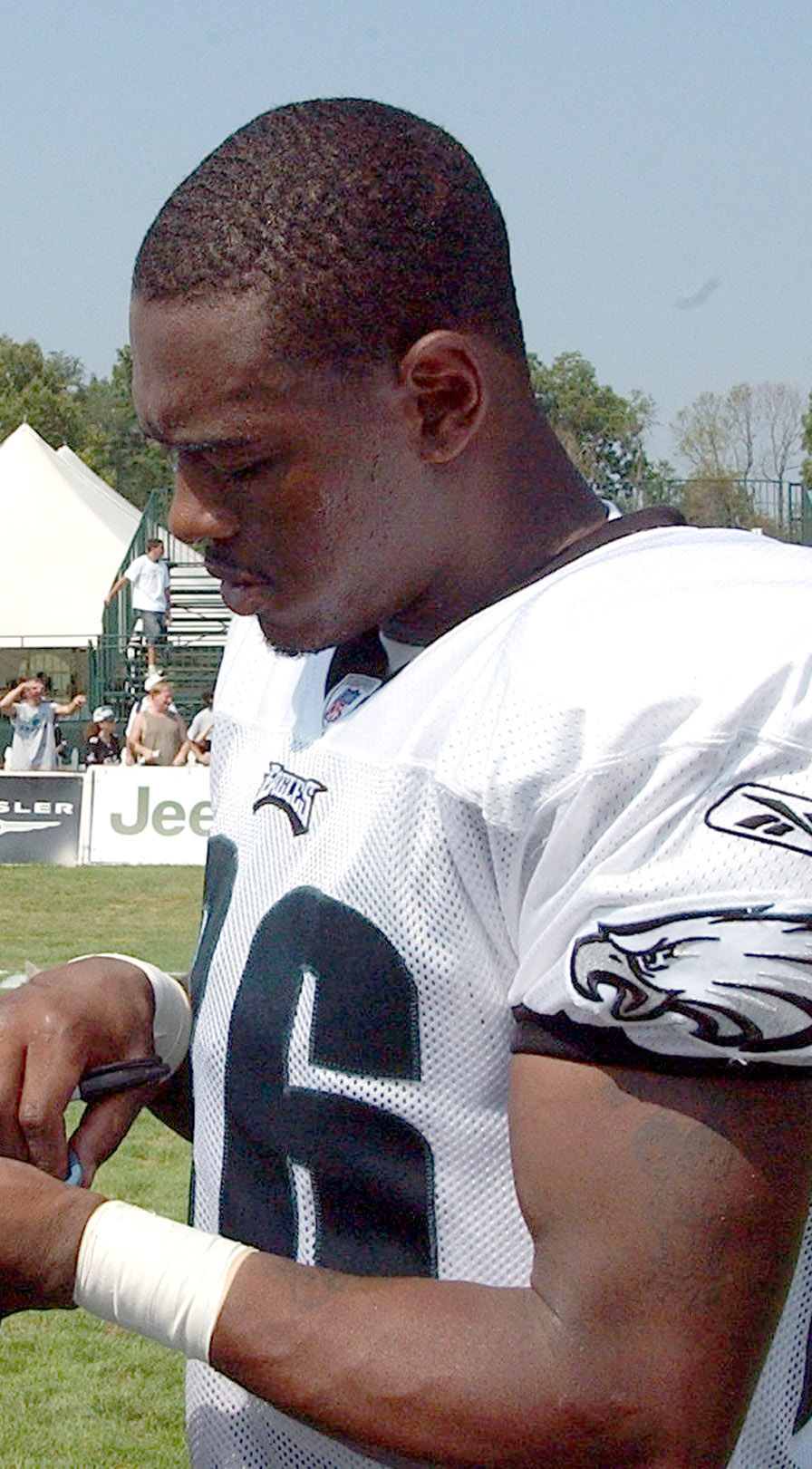
- Sheppard with the Philadelphia Eagles in 2005

No. 26, 29, 21
- Position: Cornerback

Personal information
- Born: April 8, 1981 (age 45); Jacksonville, Florida, U.S.
- Listed height: 5 ft 10 in (1.78 m)
- Listed weight: 194 lb (88 kg)

Career information
- High school: Raines (Jacksonville)
- College: Florida (1999–2001)
- NFL draft: 2002: 1st round, 26th overall pick

Career history

Playing
- Philadelphia Eagles (2002–2008); New York Jets (2009); Minnesota Vikings (2010); Oakland Raiders (2011)

Coaching
- Orlando Apollos (2019) Safeties coach

Awards and highlights
- First-team All-Pro (2004); 2× Pro Bowl (2004, 2006); First-team All-American (2000); Second-team All-American (2001); 2× First-team All-SEC (2000, 2001)

Career NFL statistics
- Total tackles: 345
- Sacks: 3.0
- Forced fumbles: 3
- Pass deflections: 85
- Interceptions: 19
- Defensive touchdowns: 3
- Stats at Pro Football Reference

Lito Decorian Sheppard (born April 8, 1981) is an American football coach and former player. During his playing career as cornerback, he played in the National Football League (NFL) for ten seasons. He was selected by the Philadelphia Eagles in the first round of the 2002 NFL draft after playing college football for the Florida Gators. He played for the Eagles for seven seasons, and was selected to the Pro Bowl twice. He also played for the NFL's New York Jets, Minnesota Vikings, and Oakland Raiders. As a coach, he was the safeties coach for the Orlando Apollos of the Alliance of American Football (AAF) in 2019.

== Early life ==
Sheppard was born in Jacksonville, Florida in 1981. He attended William M. Raines High School in Jacksonville, where he was an all-state selection and USA Today All-American at defensive back for the Raines Vikings high school football team. Sheppard had eighteen interceptions in twenty-nine games as a junior and senior, and led the Vikings to an undefeated season and a state championship in 1998. In 2007, eight years after he graduated from high school, the Florida High School Athletic Association (FHSAA) recognized Sheppard as one of the "100 Greatest Players of the First 100 Years" of Florida high school football.

== College career ==
Sheppard accepted an athletic scholarship to attend the University of Florida in Gainesville, Florida, where he played for coach Steve Spurrier's Gators teams from 1999 to 2001. He was a first-team All-American as a sophomore in 2000, and a first-team All-Southeastern Conference (SEC) selection in 2000 and 2001. In his three-season college career, he started twenty-two games, recorded eight interceptions, had eighty-seven tackles, and returned twenty-seven kickoffs for 472 yards (an average of 22.5 yards per return). Sheppard declared himself eligible for the NFL draft after his junior year.

In one of a series of articles published by The Gainesville Sun in 2006, he was ranked as No. 44 among the 100 greatest Gators from the first 100 years of Florida football.

== Professional career ==
Pre-draft measurables
Height	Weight	Vertical jump	Broad jump	Bench press
5 ft 10 in (1.78 m)	194 lb (88 kg)	37.5 in (0.95 m)	10 ft 0 in (3.05 m)	11 reps
All values from NFL Combine

=== Philadelphia Eagles ===
In the 2002 NFL draft, Sheppard was selected in the first round (twenty-sixth pick overall) by the Philadelphia Eagles.

In 2004 Sheppard had five interceptions, including two returned for touchdowns. He was named Defensive Player of the Month for the month of November after returning two interceptions for touchdowns. Sheppard was selected to his first Pro Bowl in 2004, and he was also named first-team All-Pro for his first and only year.

2005 was the first of three injury-filled seasons for Sheppard. He missed six games and finished with three interceptions.

On October 8, 2006, Sheppard became the first player in NFL history to have two interception returns for touchdowns of more than 100 yards. Both returns came against the Dallas Cowboys (2004 and 2006). The most recent return sealed a 38–24 win over the Cowboys and secured 1st place in the division for the Eagles.

In the Eagles Wild Card playoff game on January 7 against the New York Giants, Sheppard dislocated his elbow. He missed the next playoff game against the Saints, which the Eagles lost 27–24.

In a 2007 game against the Green Bay Packers Sheppard suffered an injury. Sheppard went through another injury-filled season and finished with two interceptions.

In the 2008 offseason, the Philadelphia Eagles signed former New England Patriots cornerback Asante Samuel, which fueled speculation that Sheppard was available via trade. Sheppard changed agents to Drew Rosenhaus soon afterwards.

During the 2008 season, Sheppard saw much reduced action due to good performances by starting corners Asante Samuel and Sheldon Brown.

=== New York Jets ===
Sheppard was traded to the New York Jets on February 28, 2009, for a fifth round pick in the 2009 NFL draft and a conditional pick in the 2010 NFL Draft. The Jets restructured Sheppards' contract, adding one year and "new" money to the contract in 2010. He was released on March 4, 2010.

=== Minnesota Vikings ===
Sheppard signed a one-year, $2 million contract with the Minnesota Vikings on April 21, 2010. He became a free agent following the 2010 season.

=== Oakland Raiders ===
Sheppard was signed by the Oakland Raiders on August 26, 2011, released during the final cuts on September 3, and then re-signed by the team on October 31. During the remainder of the 2011 season, he played in nine games and started seven of them. He became a free agent after the season.

== NFL statistics ==
=== Regular season ===
Year	Team	GP	Tackles				Fumbles		Interceptions					
Year	Team	GP	Comb	Solo	Ast	Sack	FF	FR	Int	Yds	Avg	Lng	TD	PD
2002	PHI	12	13	10	3	0.0	0	0	0	0	0.0	0	0	0
2003	PHI	16	51	44	7	0.0	1	0	1	34	34.0	34	0	18
2004	PHI	15	56	52	4	1.0	0	0	5	172	34.4	101	2	14
2005	PHI	10	31	27	4	1.0	1	0	3	72	24.0	34	0	9
2006	PHI	13	30	25	5	0.0	0	1	6	157	26.2	102	1	19
2007	PHI	11	51	47	4	0.0	0	0	2	25	12.5	16	0	5
2008	PHI	16	21	18	3	0.0	1	0	1	0	0.0	0	0	4
2009	NYJ	11	31	25	6	0.0	0	0	1	0	0.0	0	0	8
2010	MIN	13	18	15	3	0.0	0	0	0	0	0.0	0	0	4
2011	OAK	9	43	40	3	1.0	0	0	0	0	0.0	0	0	4
Career		126	345	303	42	3.0	3	1	19	460	24.2	102	3	85

=== Postseason ===
Year	Team	GP	Tackles				Fumbles		Interceptions					
Year	Team	GP	Comb	Solo	Ast	Sack	FF	FR	Int	Yds	Avg	Lng	TD	PD
2003	PHI	2	1	1	0	0.0	0	0	0	0	0.0	0	0	0
2004	PHI	3	11	9	2	0.0	0	0	0	0	0.0	0	0	5
2006	PHI	1	4	3	1	0.0	1	0	0	0	0.0	0	0	0
2008	PHI	3	2	2	0	0.0	0	0	0	0	0.0	0	0	0
2009	NYJ	3	9	8	1	0.0	0	0	0	0	0.0	0	0	1
Career		12	27	23	4	0.0	1	0	0	0	0.0	0	0	6

== Coaching career ==
In 2017, Sheppard became the defense coach for the James Weldon Johnson Trojans and won many games with them.

== See also ==
- 2000 College Football All-America Team
- Florida Gators football, 1990–99
- List of Florida Gators football All-Americans
- List of Florida Gators in the NFL draft
- List of Philadelphia Eagles first-round draft picks
