= Mike Patterson (American football) =

American football player (born 1983)

No. 93, 98
- Position: Defensive tackle

Personal information
- Born: September 1, 1983 (age 43); Sacramento, California, U.S.
- Listed height: 6 ft 1 in (1.85 m)
- Listed weight: 300 lb (136 kg)

Career information
- High school: Los Alamitos (Los Alamitos, California)
- College: USC (2001–2004)
- NFL draft: 2005: 1st round, 31st overall pick

Career history
- Philadelphia Eagles (2005−2012); New York Giants (2013−2014)

Awards and highlights
- PFWA All-Rookie Team (2005); First-team All-American (2004); 2× First-team All-Pac-10 (2003, 2004); Second-team All-Pac-10 (2002)

Career NFL statistics
- Total tackles: 388
- Sacks: 16.5
- Forced fumbles: 4
- Fumble recoveries: 8
- Interceptions: 1
- Defensive touchdowns: 1
- Stats at Pro Football Reference

Michael Antonio Patterson (born September 1, 1983) is an American former professional football player who was a defensive tackle in the National Football League (NFL). He was selected by the Philadelphia Eagles in the first round of the 2005 NFL draft. He played college football for the USC Trojans.

== Early life ==
Patterson is originally from Sacramento, California, but while visiting some family in Los Alamitos, California, in between 8th and 9th grades, he decided to stay down there so that he could play football at Los Alamitos High School. He had decided this only after attending a summer football camp with his cousin Jorrel and enjoying the game very much.

Patterson became a very good player even though he had never played at all prior to the summer camp. As a junior in high school, Patterson was named to the Long Beach Press-Telegram Dream Team second-team and All-Sunset League first-team honors. In his senior year, he earned Prep Star All-American, SuperPrep All-Far West, Prep Star All-Western Region, Long Beach Press-Telegram Best of the West second-team, Los Angeles Times All-Orange County, Orange County Register All-Orange County first-team, Long Beach Press-Telegram Dream Team first-team and All-Sunset League honors.

== College career ==
USC defensive line coach Ed Orgeron recruited Patterson based on raw talent, and fought to sell the recruit on first-year head coach Pete Carroll, who eventually relented.

For the USC Trojans, Patterson was a first-team All-American. Patterson played four years and helped win two National Championships with USC. He started for three years and played mainly as a nose tackle, but also a defensive tackle. During his senior year, Patterson was the subject of double coverage by many other teams.

He was nicknamed "Baby Sapp" by Orgeron after former NFL defensive tackle Warren Sapp, who Orgeron had coached at the University of Miami. Patterson considered Sapp his idol for succeeding at a similar body type, and planned to emulate him.

Patterson was a sociology major at USC.

== Professional career ==
Pre-draft measurables
Height	Weight	Arm length	Hand span	40-yard dash	20-yard shuttle	Three-cone drill	Vertical jump	Broad jump	Bench press
5 ft 11 5/8 in (1.82 m)	292 lb (132 kg)	33 1/4 in (0.84 m)	10 1/4 in (0.26 m)	4.93 s	4.49 s	7.62 s	32.5 in (0.83 m)	9 ft 0 in (2.74 m)	26 reps
All values from NFL Combine/Pro Day

=== Philadelphia Eagles ===
Patterson was selected by the Philadelphia Eagles in the first round with the 31st overall pick in the 2005 NFL draft out of the University of Southern California.

He started the 2005 season as second string, but started his first-ever NFL game on September 25, 2005, when starter Darwin Walker was injured. When Walker returned to the lineup four games later, Patterson went back to second string. On December 11, 2005, Patterson was moved permanently to the starting left defensive tackle position and remained there. In 2005, Patterson was regarded as one of the best rookie defensive linemen in the NFL. He recorded the most tackles (38) in the season out of all the Eagles' defensive line and he had more sacks (3.5) than any other Eagles' defensive tackle or rookie defensive tackle in the NFL.

Patterson will go down in Eagles lore for having the longest fumble recovery in team history. On the afternoon of September 24, 2006, Patterson picked up a fumble on the Eagles' own 2-yard line and ran 98 yards for a touchdown against the San Francisco 49ers.

On November 2, 2006, Patterson signed a 7-year contract extension through the 2016 season. It was worth up to $37 million with incentives, $9 million of which was guaranteed. He was only 24 games into his rookie contract when rewarded with the extension. Patterson would remark that he was encouraged by the performance of coach Andy Reid and the goodwill he had built among others in the organization.

During training camp before the 2011 season he collapsed and suffered a seizure. Patterson was diagnosed with cerebral arteriovenous malformation. He still started in the first 15 games of the season, missing the final game due to influenza. He underwent brain surgery on January 26, 2012, but he was not medically cleared to participate in training camp in 2012. He was placed on the active/non-football illness list on July 22, 2012. Patterson was released on February 25, 2013.

=== New York Giants ===
Patterson signed with the New York Giants on April 3, 2013. On Monday, March 31, 2014, the New York Giants re-signed Patterson.

=== NFL statistics ===
Year	Team	GP	COMB	TOTAL	AST	SACK	FF	FR	FR YDS	INT	IR YDS	AVG IR	LNG	TD	PD
2005	PHI	16	44	38	6	3.5	1	0	0	0	0	0	0	0	0
2006	PHI	16	52	38	14	1.5	0	3	98	1	0	0	0	0	2
2007	PHI	16	67	50	17	4.0	1	1	0	0	0	0	0	0	1
2008	PHI	16	42	28	14	0.5	1	1	0	1	21	21	21	0	1
2009	PHI	16	55	42	13	1.5	0	0	0	0	0	0	0	0	0
2010	PHI	15	37	30	7	2.0	0	1	0	0	0	0	0	0	0
2011	PHI	15	35	26	9	2.5	1	2	0	0	0	0	0	0	0
2012	PHI	5	6	3	3	1.0	0	0	0	0	0	0	0	0	0
2013	NYG	16	23	18	5	0.0	0	0	0	0	0	0	0	0	0
2014	NYG	16	27	15	12	0.0	0	0	0	0	0	0	0	0	0
Career		147	388	288	100	16.5	4	8	0	1	21	21	21	0	4

== Personal life ==
At USC, Patterson met his eventual fiancée, Bianca, who was a resident adviser for his student housing. One of his college roommates, Jonathan Abrams, is now a journalist for The New York Times.
