= 2010 Philadelphia Eagles season =

78th season in franchise history

- Owner: Jeffrey Lurie
- General manager: Howie Roseman
- Head coach: Andy Reid
- Offensive coordinator: Marty Mornhinweg
- Defensive coordinator: Sean McDermott
- Home stadium: Lincoln Financial Field

Results
- Record: 10–6
- Division place: 1st NFC East
- Playoffs: Lost Wild Card Playoffs (vs. Packers) 16–21
- All-Pros: K David Akers (2nd team); SS Quintin Mikell (2nd team); OT Jason Peters (2nd team)
- Pro Bowlers: QB Michael Vick; WR DeSean Jackson; OT Jason Peters; CB Asante Samuel; K David Akers

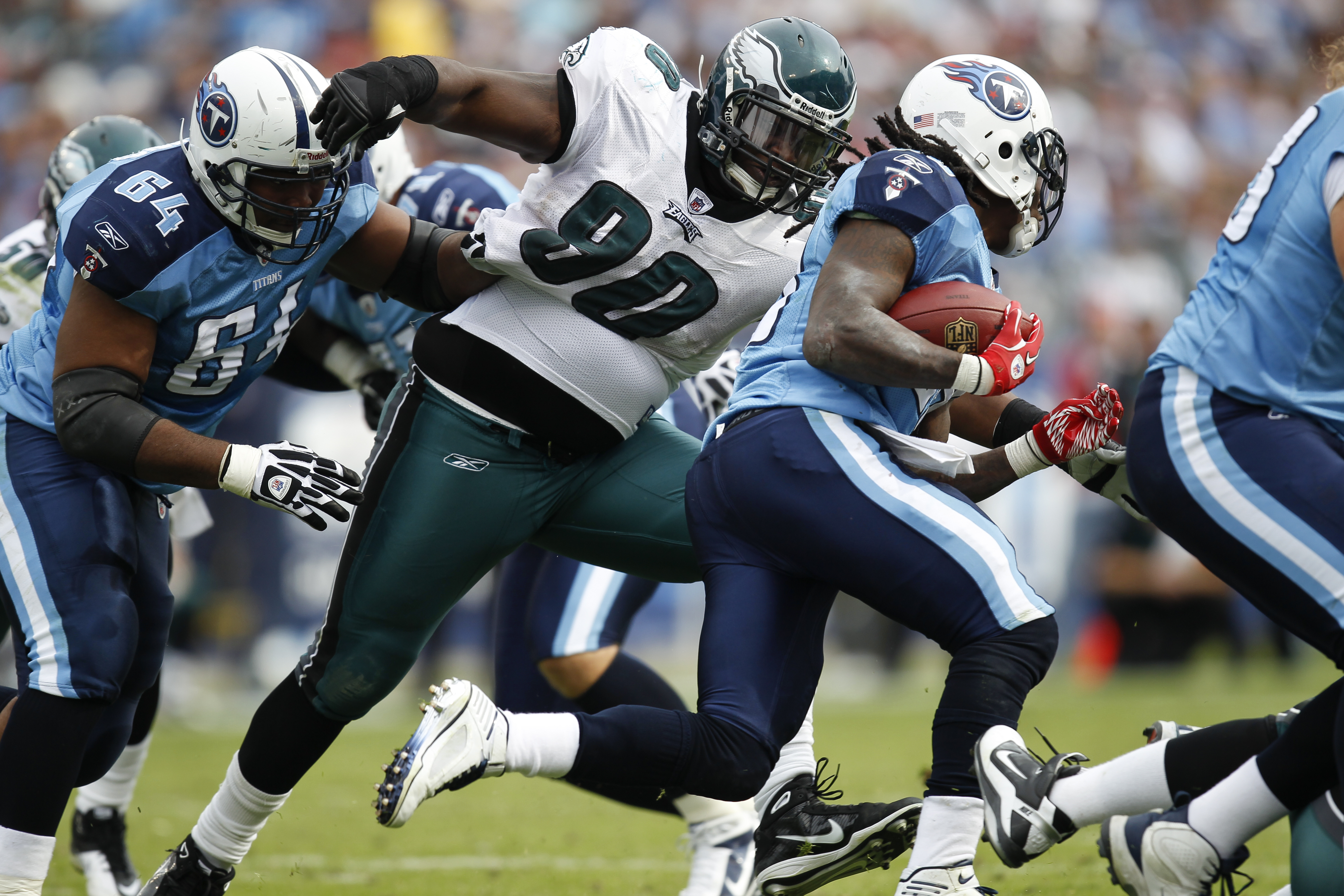
Eagles' defensive tackle Antonio Dixon against the Tennessee Titans, October 24, 2010

The 2010 season was the Philadelphia Eagles' 78th in the National Football League (NFL) and their 12th under head coach Andy Reid. The Eagles failed to improve on their 11–5 record from 2009, finishing with a 10–6 record. However, they were able to win their division due to a head-to-head sweep tiebreaker over the New York Giants, who also finished 10–6. In the wild-card round of the playoffs, the Eagles lost to the eventual Super Bowl champion Green Bay Packers by a score of 21–16.

The Eagles played all home games at Lincoln Financial Field in Philadelphia. The off-season saw a significant roster overhaul as Donovan McNabb and Brian Westbrook, two of the franchise's key players over the last decade, departed. McNabb was traded to Philadelphia's NFC East rival, the Washington Redskins, while Westbrook was cut from the roster and later signed with the San Francisco 49ers. Kevin Kolb was intended to be the Eagles' new franchise quarterback, however he was injured during the Week 1 game and replaced by Michael Vick, who started in 11 of 16 games (Kolb started in Weeks 4–6 when he was injured, as well as Week 17 with Vick and the starters resting for the playoffs.) With Vick at quarterback, they set franchise records, including a memorable comeback win against the New York Giants and a season-high 59 points in Washington.

Despite the losses of McNabb and Westbrook, Football Outsiders calculated that the 2010 Eagles had the third-best rushing attack of any single-season team from 1993 to 2010.

This season marked the first season since 1995 that the Eagles wore Kelly green uniforms. They would not be worn again until 2023.

== Offseason ==
=== Personnel changes ===
On January 11, 2010, general manager Tom Heckert was hired by the Cleveland Browns in the same position. On January 14, the Eagles fired special teams coordinator Ted Daisher in order to hire former Buffalo Bills special teams coordinator Bobby April, who opted out of his contract with the Bills, to a three-year contract. The team also fired strength and conditioning coach Mike Wolf and assistant strength and conditioning coach Jay Merlino. On January 20, the Browns hired Director of Pro Personnel Jon Sandusky as their Director of Player Personnel. They also hired college/pro scout John Spytek as a personnel executive. On January 25, special assistant to the defense Brian Stewart left to take the defensive coordinator job with the University of Houston. On January 27, the Eagles promoted Barry Rubin from strength and conditioning assistant coach to head strength and conditioning coach. They also hired Ken Croner as their assistant strength and conditioning coach. On January 29, vice president of player personnel Howie Roseman was promoted to general manager to replace Heckert. On February 3, the Eagles hired former Buffalo Bills head coach Dick Jauron as a senior assistant and defensive backs coach. They also promoted director of college scouting Ryan Grigson to director of player personnel and assistant director of pro personnel Louis Riddick to director of pro personnel. Anthony Patch was named assistant director of college scouting, Andy Speyer was named southwest regional scout, and Brett Veach was named pro and college scout. The Eagles also promoted defensive quality control coach Mike Caldwell to assistant linebackers coach, and promoted defensive coaching intern Mike Zordich to defensive quality control coach. On February 4, the Eagles hired former Browns general manager Phil Savage as a player personnel consultant for the 2010 NFL draft. On April 1, the team extended President Joe Banner's contract through 2013 and promoted Senior Vice President and chief financial officer Don Smolenski to chief operating officer. On May 27, the Eagles hired Daniel Jeremiah, who was a scout for the Browns and Baltimore Ravens, as a scout for the West Coast region.

=== Roster changes ===
==== Free agents ====
Pos	Player	Tag	2010 Team	Signed
WR	Jason Avant	RFA	Eagles	March 8
DE	Jason Babin	UFA	Titans	March 19
OL	Nick Cole	RFA	Eagles	April 7
LB	Omar Gaither	RFA	Eagles	March 31
LB	Chris Gocong	RFA	Browns	March 30
CB	Ellis Hobbs	RFA	Eagles	March 30
OL	Max Jean-Gilles	RFA	Eagles	April 15
FS	Sean Jones	UFA	Buccaneers	March 16
LB	Akeem Jordan	RFA	Eagles	March 22
P	Sav Rocca	RFA	Eagles	April 22
TE	Alex Smith	UFA	Browns	May 3
LB	Jeremiah Trotter	UFA		
FB	Leonard Weaver	RFA	Eagles	March 5
LB	Tracy White	UFA	Eagles	July 31

Player re-signed by Eagles

==== Releases ====
Pos	Player	Released	2010 Team	Signed
OL	Shawn Andrews	March 17	Giants	August 20
WR	Kevin Curtis	March 18	Dolphins	December 13
DE	Darren Howard	March 18		
TE	Martin Rucker	August 9	Cowboys	August 19
RB	Brian Westbrook	March 5	49ers	August 16
LB	Will Witherspoon	March 5	Titans	March 9

==== Signings ====
Pos	Player	Tag	2009 Team	Signed	Cut
WR	Hank Baskett	UFA	Colts	March 12	September 21
RB	Mike Bell	RFA	Saints	March 23	Traded
P	Durant Brooks	UFA	Packers	February 2	May 25
DE	Pannel Egboh	Waivers	Texans	August 31	September 3
WR	Chad Hall	UFA	None	March 11	September 4
S	Antoine Harris	UFA	Falcons	July 29	–
OG	Greg Isdaner	UFA	Eagles	May 4	August 28
FS	Marlin Jackson	UFA	Colts	March 10	–
TE	Nate Lawrie	UFA	Redwoods	August 9	September 3
RB	Martell Mallett	UFA	BC Lions	January 19	July 31 (Recalled Aug. 1 Waived September 3)
P	Ken Parrish	UFA	Jets	April 28	August 15
S	Anthony Scirrotto	UFA	Giants	August 16	September 3
C	A. Q. Shipley	UFA	Steelers	January 11	September 4
WR	Kelley Washington	UFA	Ravens	July 31	September 4
FB	Dwayne Wright	UFA	Giants	January 29	August 1

==== Trades ====
On March 8, wide receiver Reggie Brown was traded to the Tampa Bay Buccaneers in exchange for a 6th round draft pick in the 2011 NFL draft. On March 16, defensive end Chris Clemons and a 2010 fourth-round draft pick were traded to the Seattle Seahawks in exchange for defensive end Darryl Tapp. On April 2, cornerback Sheldon Brown and linebacker Chris Gocong were traded to the Cleveland Browns in exchange for 2010 fourth- and fifth-round draft picks and linebacker Alex Hall. Hall was later waived on July 28. On April 4, the Eagles traded quarterback Donovan McNabb to the Washington Redskins for a second-round pick in 2010 and a conditional third- or fourth-round pick in 2011. On April 19, the Eagles were involved in a three-team trade with the Denver Broncos and Detroit Lions; the Lions sent linebacker Ernie Sims to the Eagles, the Eagles sent a 2010 fifth-round draft pick to the Broncos, and the Broncos sent tight end Tony Scheffler and a 2010 seventh-round draft pick to the Lions. On July 30, the Eagles traded linebacker Joe Mays to the Broncos in exchange for running back J. J. Arrington. On August 30, the Eagles traded sixth-round draft pick fullback Charles Scott to the Arizona Cardinals in exchange for sixth-round draft pick cornerback Jorrick Calvin. On September 4, linebacker Tracy White was traded to the New England Patriots for a conditional 2012 pick, while offensive lineman Stacy Andrews was traded to the Seattle Seahawks for a 2011 seventh-round pick. On October 13, running back Mike Bell was traded to the Cleveland Browns in exchange for running back Jerome Harrison.

==== 2010 draft class ====
Draft		Player	Pos	College	Height	Weight	Signed	Cut	Traded	Notes
Rnd	Sel	Player	Pos	College	Height	Weight	Signed	Cut	Traded	Notes
1	13	Brandon Graham	DE	Michigan	6'1"	268	July 29	–	–	(Note: The team traded its first-round selection (24th overall, later traded to the Patriots and Cowboys; used to select Dez Bryant) and two third-round selections (70th overall, later traded to the Ravens; used to select Ed Dickson; and 87th overall; used to select Eric Decker) to the Broncos for its first-round selection (13th overall).)
2	37	Nate Allen	S	South Florida	6'0"	207	July 27	–	–	(Note: The team traded quarterback Donovan McNabb to the Redskins for its second-round selection (37th overall) and a conditional draft pick in 2011.) (Note: The team traded its second-round selection (55th overall; used to select Sean Lee) to the Cowboys for its second- (59th overall, later traded to the Browns for its third-round selection (71st overall, later traded to the Packers for its third-round selection (86th overall) and fourth-round selection (105th overall); used to select Morgan Burnett), and two fifth-round selections (134th and 146th overall, later traded to the Chargers for its fifth-round selection (159th overall) and a fifth-round selection in the 2011 NFL Draft; used to select Cam Thomas); used to select Montario Hardesty) and fourth-round selections (125th overall).)
3	86	Daniel Te'o-Nesheim	DE	Washington	6'3"	263	June 16	–	–	(Note: The team traded its third-round selection in the 2009 NFL draft (91st overall, used to select Deon Butler) to the Seahawks for its third-round selection (70th overall, see draft note 1) and fifth- (137th overall, traded to Detroit and later traded to Baltimore; used to select Jason Phillips) and seventh-round (213th overall, used to select Paul Fanaika) selections in the 2009 NFL Draft.) (Note: See draft note 2)
4	105	Trevard Lindley	CB	Kentucky	6'0"	175	June 4	–	–	(Note: The team traded cornerback Sheldon Brown and linebacker Chris Gocong to the Browns for its fourth- (105th overall) and fifth-round selections (137th overall, see draft note 10) in the 2010 NFL draft and linebacker Alex Hall.) (Note: The team traded cornerback Lito Sheppard to the Jets for its fourth-round selection (127th overall, later traded to the Seahawks; used to select E. J. Wilson) and its fifth-round selection (153rd overall, used to select Cornelius Ingram) in the 2009 NFL draft. Due to Sheppard's release by the Jets on March 4, the Eagles traded a fifth-round selection (155th overall, later traded to the Steelers and Cardinals; used to select John Skelton) to the Jets as well.) (Note: The team traded defensive end Chris Clemons and a fourth-round selection (see draft note 7) to the Seahawks for defensive end Darryl Tapp.)
4	121	Keenan Clayton	OLB	Oklahoma	6'1"	229	June 10	–	–	
4	122	Mike Kafka	QB	Northwestern	6'3"	225	June 15	–	–	
4	125	Clay Harbor	TE	Missouri State	6'2"	252	June 15	–	–	
5	134	Ricky Sapp	DE	Clemson	6'4"	252	June 8	–	–	(Note: See draft note 3) (Note: The team traded its fifth-round selection in the 2009 NFL draft (164th overall, used to select Thomas Morstead) to the Saints for its fifth-round selection (137th overall, later traded to the Broncos in a three-team trade in which the Eagles acquired linebacker Ernie Sims from the Lions) and its seventh-round (222nd overall, traded to Indianapolis for its sixth-round selection (200th overall); used to select Pat McAfee) selection in the 2009 NFL Draft.) (Note: The team traded its fifth-round selection (163rd overall, later traded to the Redskins and Dolphins; used to select Reshad Jones) and wide receiver Brandon Gibson to the Rams for linebacker Will Witherspoon.) (Note: See draft note 4)
5	159	Riley Cooper	WR	Florida	6'3"	222	July 13	–	–	
6	200	Charles Scott	RB	LSU	5'11"	238	June 2	–	August 30	(Note: See draft note 10) (Note: The team traded its sixth-round selection (192nd overall; used to select Danny Batten) and first- (28th overall, used to select Eric Wood) and fourth-round (121st overall, used to select Shawn Nelson) in the 2009 NFL draft to the Bills for offensive tackle Jason Peters.)
7	220	Jamar Chaney	LB	Mississippi State	6'0"	242	June 4	–	–	(Note: The team traded its seventh-round selection (231st overall, later traded to the Redskins; used to select Selvish Capers) and wide receiver Greg Lewis to New England for its fifth-round selection (159th overall, used to select Fenuki Tupou) in the 2009 NFL draft.) (Note: The team traded its sixth-round selection in 2011 to the Lions for its seventh-round selection (220th overall).)
7	243	Jeff Owens	DT	Georgia	6'1"	304	June 4	September 4	–	(Note: Compensatory draft pick)
7	244	Kurt Coleman	S	Ohio State	5'10"	192	June 3	–	–	(Note: Compensatory draft pick)

==== Undrafted free agents ====
Pos	Player	College	Signed	Cut
WR	Blue Cooper	Chattanooga	April 26	July 29
OG	Zipp Duncan	Kentucky	April 26	August 28
QB	Joey Elliott	Purdue	April 26	June 10
RB	Keithon Flemming	West Texas A&M	April 27	June 10
S	Ryan Hamilton	Vanderbilt	May 27	August 28
OT	Austin Howard	Northern Iowa	April 26	–
S	Brett Johnson	California	June 28	July 29
WR	Kevin Jurovich	San Jose State	April 26	July 29
LB	Simoni Lawrence	Minnesota	June 8	August 28
OT	Jeraill McCuller	North Carolina State	April 26	September 3
DE	Eric Moncur	Miami	April 27	August 2 (Re-signed Aug. 16 and cut again Sep. 4)
CB	Josh Morris	Weber State	April 26	May 27
CB	David Pender	Purdue	April 26	September 3
WR	Jared Perry	Missouri	July 29	July 31 (Re-signed Aug. 2 and waived Aug. 28)
DT	Boo Robinson	Wake Forest	May 18	September 3
CB	Devin Ross	Arizona	April 27	June 17
WR	Pat Simonds	Colgate	April 26	June 10
FB	Chris Zardas	Massachusetts	April 26	June 10

==== Contract extensions ====
Starting quarterback (at the time) Kevin Kolb signed a one-year contract extension worth $12.25 million on April 29, keeping him under contract with the Eagles through the 2011 season.

== Staff ==
Philadelphia Eagles 2010 staff
Front office: Chairman/CEO – Jeffrey Lurie; President – Joe Banner; general manager – Howie Roseman; Director of player personnel – Ryan Grigson; Director of pro personnel – Louis Riddick; Assistant director of college scouting – Anthony Patch; Player personnel consultant – Phil Savage; Head coaches: Head coach – Andy Reid; Assistant head coach/offensive coordinator – Marty Mornhinweg; Assistant to the head coach – Corey Matthaei; Offensive coaches: Quarterbacks – James Urban; Running backs – Ted Williams; Wide receivers – David Culley; Tight ends – Tom Melvin; Offensive line – Juan Castillo; Assistant offensive line – Eugene Chung; Offensive quality control – Doug Pederson; Statistical analysis coordinator – Mike Frazier; Coaching assistant – Matt Nagy; Coaching intern – Duce Staley	Defensive coaches: Defensive coordinator – Sean McDermott; Defensive line – Rory Segrest; Linebackers – Bill Shuey; Assistant linebackers – Mike Caldwell; Defensive backs/senior assistant – Dick Jauron; Defensive quality control – Mike Zordich; Special teams coaches: Special teams coordinator – Bobby April; Assistant special teams/offensive assistant – Jeff Nixon; Strength and conditioning: Head athletic trainer – Rick Burkholder; Head strength and conditioning – Barry Rubin; Assistant strength and conditioning – Ken Croner; Strength and conditioning – Mike Wolf

== Final roster ==
2010 Philadelphia Eagles roster
Quarterbacks (QB): 3 Mike Kafka; 4 Kevin Kolb; 7 Michael Vick; Running backs (RB): 34 Eldra Buckley; 33 Jerome Harrison; 25 LeSean McCoy; 32 Owen Schmitt; Wide receivers (WR): 81 Jason Avant; 14 Riley Cooper; 16 Chad Hall; 10 DeSean Jackson; 18 Jeremy Maclin; Tight ends (TE): 87 Brent Celek; 82 Clay Harbor	Offensive linemen (OL): 59 Nick Cole G/C; 65 King Dunlap T; 79 Todd Herremans G; 68 Austin Howard T; 62 Max Jean-Gilles G/C; 74 Winston Justice T; 77 Mike McGlynn C; 71 Jason Peters T; 76 Reggie Wells G; Defensive linemen (DL): 97 Brodrick Bunkley DT; 63 Jeremy Clark DT; 58 Trent Cole DE; 90 Antonio Dixon DT; 93 Trevor Laws DT; 73 Bobby McCray DE; 75 Juqua Parker DE; 98 Mike Patterson DT; 91 Darryl Tapp DE; 52 Daniel Te'o-Nesheim DE	Linebackers (LB): 55 Stewart Bradley MLB; 51 Jamar Chaney MLB; 57 Keenan Clayton OLB; 53 Moise Fokou OLB; 96 Omar Gaither MLB; 56 Akeem Jordan OLB; 50 Ernie Sims OLB; Defensive backs (DB): 45 Jamar Adams FS; 30 Colt Anderson SS; 42 Kurt Coleman FS; 21 Joselio Hanson CB; 24 Brandon Hughes CB; 47 Gerard Lawson CB; 35 Trevard Lindley CB; 27 Quintin Mikell SS; 23 Dimitri Patterson CB; 22 Asante Samuel CB; Special teams (ST): 2 David Akers K; 46 Jon Dorenbos LS; 6 Sav Rocca P	Practice squad: 26 Joique Bell RB; 83 Rod Harper WR; 88 Cornelius Ingram TE; 66 Dallas Reynolds G; 61 A. Q. Shipley C; 78 Fenuki Tupou T; 85 Jeremy Williams WR; Reserve: 95 Victor Abiamiri DE (PUP); 29 Nate Allen FS (IR); 38 Jorrick Calvin CB (IR); 54 Brandon Graham DE (IR); 41 Antoine Harris SS (IR); 31 Ellis Hobbs CB (IR); 67 Jamaal Jackson C (IR); 28 Marlin Jackson FS (IR); 64 Jeff Owens DT (IR); 94 Ricky Sapp DE (IR); 43 Leonard Weaver FB (IR); Rookies in italics 53 active, 11 reserve, 7 practice squad

== Opening training camp roster ==
Philadelphia Eagles 2010 opening training camp roster
Quarterbacks: 3 Mike Kafka ^{R}; 4 Kevin Kolb; 7 Michael Vick; Running backs: 26 Mike Bell; 34 Eldra Buckley; 25 LeSean McCoy; 33 Martell Mallett ^{UR}; 38 Charles Scott ^{R}; 43 Leonard Weaver FB; 32 Dwayne Wright FB; Wide receivers: 81 Jason Avant; 84 Hank Baskett; 11 Dobson Collins; 14 Riley Cooper ^{R}; 16 Chad Hall ^{UR}; 10 DeSean Jackson; 18 Jeremy Maclin; 19 Jordan Norwood; 85 Jared Perry ^{UR}; Tight ends: 87 Brent Celek; 82 Clay Harbor FB ^{R}; 88 Cornelius Ingram; 89 Martin Rucker	Offensive linemen: 76 Stacy Andrews G/T; 59 Nick Cole G/C; 63 Zipp Duncan G ^{UR}; 65 King Dunlap T; 68 Austin Howard T ^{UR}; 75 Greg Isdaner G; 62 Max Jean-Gilles G; 74 Winston Justice T; 73 Jeraill McCuller T ^{UR}; 77 Mike McGlynn G/C; 71 Jason Peters T; 66 Dallas Reynolds G/C; 61 A. Q. Shipley C; 78 Fenuki Tupou G/T; Defensive linemen: 97 Brodrick Bunkley DT; 58 Trent Cole DE; 90 Antonio Dixon DT; 54 Brandon Graham DE ^{R}; 93 Trevor Laws DT; 61 Eric Moncur DE ^{UR}; 64 Jeff Owens DT ^{R}; 75 Juqua Parker DE; 98 Mike Patterson DT; 66 Boo Robinson DT ^{UR}; 94 Ricky Sapp DE/OLB ^{R}; 91 Darryl Tapp DE/DT; 52 Daniel Te'o-Nesheim DE/DT ^{R}	Linebackers: 55 Stewart Bradley ILB; 49 Jamar Chaney ILB ^{R}; 59 Keenan Clayton ILB ^{R}; 53 Moise Fokou OLB; 96 Omar Gaither ILB/OLB; 56 Akeem Jordan OLB; 45 Simoni Lawrence OLB ^{UR}; 51 Joe Mays ILB; 50 Ernie Sims OLB; Defensive backs: 29 Nate Allen FS ^{R}; 42 Kurt Coleman SS ^{R}; 39 Quintin Demps SS; 48 Ryan Hamilton FS ^{UR}; 21 Joselio Hanson CB; 41 Antoine Harris S; 24 Macho Harris CB; 31 Ellis Hobbs CB; 35 Trevard Lindley CB ^{R}; 27 Quintin Mikell SS; 23 Dimitri Patterson CB; 37 David Pender CB ^{UR}; 30 Geoff Pope CB; 22 Asante Samuel CB; Special teams: 2 David Akers K; 46 Jon Dorenbos LS; 13 Ken Parrish P; 6 Sav Rocca P	Reserve lists: 95 Victor Abiamiri DE/DT (active/PUP); 79 Todd Herremans G/T (active/PUP); 67 Jamaal Jackson C (active/PUP); 28 Marlin Jackson FS/CB (IR); Notations: R: 2010 rookie; UR: 2010 undrafted rookie

== Roster cuts ==
In the first round of roster cuts, the Eagles waived guard Zipp Duncan, safety Ryan Hamilton, guard Greg Isdaner, linebacker Simoni Lawrence, and wide receiver Jared Perry in order to get down to 75 players on August 28.

In the second round of roster cuts, the Eagles waived cornerback Geoff Pope, defensive end Pannel Egboh, defensive tackle Boo Robinson, cornerback David Pender, wide receiver Dobson Collins, tight end Nate Lawrie, offensive tackle Jeraill McCuller, running back J. J. Arrington, safety Anthony Scirrotto and running back Martell Mallett on September 3. In addition, defensive end Victor Abiamiri was placed on the Physically Unable to Perform list. The Eagles also traded an undisclosed 2011 draft pick to the Arizona Cardinals in exchange for guard Reggie Wells.

On September 4, the Eagles traded for defensive end Antwan Barnes from the Baltimore Ravens, and gave the Ravens a 2011 seventh-round draft pick. More second round cuts were announced, including wide receiver Chad Hall, wide receiver Jordan Norwood, tight end Cornelius Ingram, center A.Q. Shipley, center Dallas Reynolds, offensive lineman Fenuki Tupou, defensive end Eric Moncur, defensive tackle Jeff Owens, safety Macho Harris, and safety Quintin Demps.

== Schedule ==
=== Preseason ===
Week	Date	Opponent	Result	Record	Venue	Recap
1	August 13	Jacksonville Jaguars	**W** 28–27	1–0	Lincoln Financial Field	Recap
2	August 20	at Cincinnati Bengals	**L** 9–22	1–1	Paul Brown Stadium	Recap
3	August 27	at Kansas City Chiefs	**W** 20–17	2–1	Arrowhead Stadium	Recap
4	September 2	New York Jets	**L** 17–21	2–2	Lincoln Financial Field	Recap

=== Regular season ===
Week	Date	Opponent	Result	Record	Venue	Recap
1	September 12	Green Bay Packers	**L** 20–27	0–1	Lincoln Financial Field	Recap
2	September 19	at Detroit Lions	**W** 35–32	1–1	Ford Field	Recap
3	September 26	at Jacksonville Jaguars	**W** 28–3	2–1	EverBank Field	Recap
4	October 3	**Washington Redskins**	**L** 12–17	2–2	Lincoln Financial Field	Recap
5	October 10	at San Francisco 49ers	**W** 27–24	3–2	Candlestick Park	Recap
6	October 17	Atlanta Falcons	**W** 31–17	4–2	Lincoln Financial Field	Recap
7	October 24	at Tennessee Titans	**L** 19–37	4–3	LP Field	Recap
8	Bye					
9	November 7	Indianapolis Colts	**W** 26–24	5–3	Lincoln Financial Field	Recap
10	November 15	at **Washington Redskins**	**W** 59–28	6–3	FedExField	Recap
11	November 21	**New York Giants**	**W** 27–17	7–3	Lincoln Financial Field	Recap
12	November 28	at Chicago Bears	**L** 26–31	7–4	Soldier Field	Recap
13	December 2	Houston Texans	**W** 34–24	8–4	Lincoln Financial Field	Recap
14	December 12	at **Dallas Cowboys**	**W** 30–27	9–4	Cowboys Stadium	Recap
15	December 19	at **New York Giants**	**W** 38–31	10–4	New Meadowlands Stadium	Recap
16	December 28	Minnesota Vikings	**L** 14–24	10–5	Lincoln Financial Field	Recap
17	January 2	**Dallas Cowboys**	**L** 13–14	10–6	Lincoln Financial Field	Recap

Note: Intra-division opponents are in bold text.

=== Postseason ===
Round	Date	Opponent (seed)	Result	Record	Venue	Recap
Wild Card	January 9, 2011	Green Bay Packers (6)	**L** 16–21	0–1	Lincoln Financial Field	Recap

== Standings ==
NFC East
	W	L	T	PCT	DIV	CONF	PF	PA	STK
^{(3)} Philadelphia Eagles	10	6	0	.625	4–2	7–5	439	377	L2
New York Giants	10	6	0	.625	3–3	8–4	394	347	W1
Dallas Cowboys	6	10	0	.375	3–3	4–8	394	436	W1
Washington Redskins	6	10	0	.375	2–4	4–8	302	377	L1

== Preseason results ==
Preseason Week 1 – vs Jacksonville Jaguars

Quarter	1	2	3	4	Total
Jaguars	0	17	10	0	27
Eagles	6	10	3	9	28

at Lincoln Financial Field, Philadelphia

- Date: August 13
- Game weather: 89 °F (32 °C), mostly cloudy
- Game attendance: 69,144
- Recap

Preseason Week 2 – at Cincinnati Bengals

Quarter	1	2	3	4	Total
Eagles	0	6	3	0	9
Bengals	0	7	0	15	22

at Paul Brown Stadium, Cincinnati

- Date: August 20
- Game weather: 83 °F (28 °C), fair
- Game attendance: 55,702
- Recap

== Regular-season results ==
=== Week 1: vs. Green Bay Packers ===
Week 1: Green Bay Packers at Philadelphia Eagles – Game summary

Quarter	1	2	3	4	Total
Packers	0	13	14	0	27
Eagles	3	0	7	10	20

at Lincoln Financial Field, Philadelphia

- Date: September 12
- Game time: 4:15 p.m. EDT
- Game weather: 69 °F (21 °C), (Cloudy)
- Game attendance: 69,144
- Referee: John Parry
- TV announcers (FOX): Joe Buck, Troy Aikman, and Pam Oliver
- Recap

Game information

First quarter

- PHI – David Akers 45-yard field goal, Eagles 3–0, Drive: 8 plays, 26 yards, 4:00.

Second quarter

- GB – Mason Crosby 49-yard field goal, Tied 3–3, Drive: 10 plays, 43 yards, 5:31.
- GB – Donald Driver 6-yard pass from Aaron Rodgers (Mason Crosby kick), Packers 10–3, Drive: 11 plays, 76 yards, 5:33.
- GB – Mason Crosby 56-yard field goal, Packers 13–3, Drive: 7 plays, 39 yards, 0:41.

Third quarter

- GB – John Kuhn 3-yard run (Mason Crosby kick), Packers 20–3, Drive: 10 plays, 62 yards, 4:53.
- PHI – LeSean McCoy 12-yard run (David Akers kick), Packers 20–10, Drive: 9 plays, 60 yards, 4:12.
- GB – Greg Jennings 32-yard pass from Aaron Rodgers (Mason Crosby kick), Packers 27–10, Drive: 4 plays, 51 yards, 2:28.

Fourth quarter

- PHI – Jeremy Maclin 17-yard pass from Michael Vick (David Akers kick), Packers 27–17, Drive: 9 plays, 79 yards, 3:39.
- PHI – David Akers 24-yard field goal, Packers 27–20, Drive: 9 plays, 45 yards, 3:31.

Top passers

- GB – Aaron Rodgers – 19/31, 188 yards, 2 touchdowns, 2 interceptions
- PHI – Michael Vick – 16/24, 175 yards, 1 touchdown

Top rushers

- GB – Brandon Jackson – 18 rushes, 63 yards
- PHI – Michael Vick – 11 rushes, 103 yards

Top receivers

- GB – Greg Jennings – 5 receptions, 82 yards, 1 touchdown
- PHI – LeSean McCoy – 5 receptions, 47 yards

Top tacklers

- GB – Clay Matthews – 7 tackles, 3.0 sack, 1 forced fumble
- PHI – Trent Cole – 6 tackles, 1.0 sack

The Eagles donned their throwback uniforms (in celebration of the franchise's 50th Anniversary of their 1960 championship team) and began their season at home for an NFC duel with the Green Bay Packers. In the first quarter, Philadelphia had the early lead with kicker David Akers making a 45-yard field goal, but failed to maintain it in the second quarter with Packers kicker Mason Crosby nailing a 49-yard field goal, followed by quarterback Aaron Rodgers throwing a 6-yard touchdown pass to wide receiver Donald Driver, followed by Crosby hitting a 56-yard field goal.

In the third quarter, the Green Bay fullback John Kuhn pushed up the middle for a 3-yard touchdown run, but the Eagles replied with running back LeSean McCoy running in a 12-yard TD run. However, the Packers extended their lead to seventeen points with Rodgers bombing a 32-yard touchdown pass to wide receiver Greg Jennings. The Eagles cut their deficit to seven points in the 4th quarter with quarterback Michael Vick tossing a 17-yard touchdown pass to wide receiver Jeremy Maclin, and with Akers nailing a 24-yard field goal, but could not come any closer as they were dealt their first home loss to the Packers since 1962.

With the loss, the Eagles began the season at 0–1. They also lost Leonard Weaver, who was considered to be the best fullback in the NFL in 2009 and had just been signed to a record-breaking contract, to a career ending injury.

=== Week 2: at Detroit Lions ===
Week 2: Philadelphia Eagles at Detroit Lions – Game summary

Quarter	1	2	3	4	Total
Eagles	7	14	7	7	35
Lions	7	10	0	15	32

at Ford Field, Detroit, Michigan

- Date: September 19
- Game time: 1:00 pm. EDT
- Game weather: None (dome stadium)
- Game attendance: 56,688
- Referee: Clete Blakeman
- TV announcers (FOX): Sam Rosen, Tim Ryan and Chris Myers
- Recap

Game information

First quarter

- PHI – DeSean Jackson 45-yard pass from Michael Vick (David Akers kick), Eagles 7–0, Drive: 4 plays, 76 yards, 2:29.
- DET – Jahvid Best 14-yard run (Jason Hanson kick), Tied 7–7, Drive: 6 plays, 76 yards, 3:00.

Second quarter

- DET – Jacob Janson 49-yard field goal, Lions 10–7, Drive: 7 plays, 12 yards, 1:54.
- DET – Jahvid Best 75-yard pass from Shaun Hill (Jason Hanson kick), Lions 17–7, Drive: 3 plays, 80 yards, 1:14.
- PHI – LeSean McCoy 14-yard run (David Akers kick), Lions 17–14, Drive: 11 plays, 74 yards, 4:23.
- PHI – Jeremy Maclin 9-yard pass from Michael Vick (David Akers kick), Eagles 21–17, Drive: 7 plays, 89 yards, 0:59.

Third quarter

- PHI – LeSean McCoy 4-yard run (David Akers kick), Eagles 28–17, Drive: 9 plays, 65 yards, 4:38.

Fourth quarter

- PHI – LeSean McCoy 46-yard run (David Akers kick), Eagles 35–17, Drive: 5 plays, 58 yards, 1:32.
- DET – Jahvid Best 2-yard run (Jason Hanson kick), Eagles 35–24, Drive: 7 plays, 85 yards, 2:04.
- DET – Calvin Johnson 19-yard pass from Shaun Hill (Shaun Hill – Calvin Johnson pass), Eagles 35–32, Drive: 6 plays, 56 yards, 1:11.

Top passers

- PHI – Michael Vick – 21/34, 284 yards, 2 touchdowns
- DET – Shaun Hill – 25/45, 335 yards, 2 touchdowns, 2 interceptions

Top rushers

- PHI – LeSean McCoy – 16 rushes, 120 yards, 3 touchdowns
- DET – Jahvid Best – 17 rushes, 78 yards, 2 touchdowns

Top receivers

- PHI – DeSean Jackson – 4 receptions, 135 yards, 1 touchdown
- DET – Jahvid Best – 9 receptions, 154 yards, 1 touchdown

Top tacklers

- PHI – Omar Gaither – 12 tackles
- DET – Ndamukong Suh – 6 tackles, 2 assists, 1 sack

Hoping to rebound from their loss to the Packers the Eagles flew to Ford Field for an NFC Duel with the Lions. The Lions looked good early in the first quarter, but with 11:15 remaining, Shaun Hill was intercepted by Nate Allen. Just four plays into the following drive, the Eagles took the early lead when QB Michael Vick bombed a 45-yard TD pass to deep threat WR DeSean Jackson. Detroit replied, driving 76 yards in 6 plays with RB Jahvid Best hauling a 14-yard touchdown run, taking 3:00 minutes off the clock. After three combined punts, the Eagles then fell behind in the 2nd quarter when kicker Jason Hanson nailed a 49-yard field goal. This was followed by QB Shaun Hill slinging a screen pass to RB Jahvid Best, who took it 75 yards for a touchdown, widening the lead to 17–7. The possession took only three plays and barely a minute off the clock. Then the Eagles replied with an 11-play, 75-yard drive that ended with RB LeSean McCoy taking in a 14-yard TD run. After a Lions punt, the Eagles marched 89 yards in less than a minute with QB Michael Vick throwing a 9-yard TD pass to WR Jeremy Maclin. The Eagles led 21–17 at halftime. On their second possession of the third quarter, the Eagles scored again, with RB LeSean McCoy hammering home a 4-yard TD run. Things got worse for the Lions, as Shaun Hill was intercepted on their next possession by Ellis Hobbs. They managed to force a punt, but wasted a 12-play, 48-yard drive that took 5:49 off the clock. On 4th-and-1 at the Eagles 29, Jahvid Best was stuffed for no gain and the Lions turned it over on downs. Worse yet, the drive took into the fourth quarter. The Eagles seemingly put the game away on their next drive when LeSean McCoy scampered off to the races on a 46-yard TD run on 3rd-and-16 with just 6:27 left, and the Eagles lead 35–17. However, the Lions roared back with RB Jahvid Best finishing off an 85-yard drive with a 2-yard TD run, making the score 35–24 with 4:15 remaining. After forcing a three-and-out, the Lions stormed 56 yards in just 6 plays, culminating with Hill completing a 19-yard TD pass to WR Calvin Johnson (With a successful 2-point conversion). The Lions recovered the onside kick with 1:50 left, but four straight incompletions ended any chance of a miracle comeback.

With the win, the Eagles improved to 1–1.

=== Week 3: at Jacksonville Jaguars ===
Week 3: Philadelphia Eagles at Jacksonville Jaguars – Game summary

Quarter	1	2	3	4	Total
Eagles	7	7	14	0	28
Jaguars	0	3	0	0	3

at EverBank Field, Jacksonville, Florida

- Date: September 26
- Game time: 4:05 p.m. EDT
- Game weather: 89 °F (32 °C) (Chance of rain)
- Game attendance: 63,256
- Referee: Jeff Triplette
- TV announcers (FOX): Ron Pitts, John Lynch & Nischelle Turner
- Game Recap

Game information

First quarter

- PHI – DeSean Jackson 61-yard pass from Michael Vick (David Akers kick), Eagles 7–0. Drive: 6 plays, 71 yards, 3:01.

Second quarter

- JAC – Josh Scobee 51-yard field goal, Eagles 7–3. Drive: 8 plays, 18 yards, 3:56.
- PHI – Jeremy Maclin 16-yard pass from Michael Vick (David Akers kick), Eagles 14–3. Drive: 7 plays, 53 yards, 1:33.

Third quarter

- PHI – Jeremy Maclin 45-yard pass from Michael Vick (David Akers kick), Eagles 21–3. Drive: 1 plays, 45 yards, 0:09.
- PHI – Michael Vick 1-yard run (David Akers kick), Eagles 28–3. Drive: 6 plays, 72 yards, 3:12.

Fourth quarter

- No scoring plays

Top passers

- JAC – David Garrard – 13/30, 105 yards, INT
- PHI – Michael Vick – 17/31, 291 yards, 3 TD

Top rushers

- JAC – Maurice Jones-Drew – 22 rushes, 88 yards
- PHI – LeSean McCoy – 11 rushes, 54 yards

Top receivers

- JAC – Mike Sims-Walker – 2 receptions, 34 yards
- PHI – DeSean Jackson – 5 receptions, 153 yards, 1 TD

Coming off their win over the Lions the Eagles flew to EverBank Field for an Interconference duel with the Jaguars. The Eagles took the lead in the first quarter when QB Michael Vick, who was named the eagles starter moving forward, made a 61-yard TD pass to WR DeSean Jackson. The lead was narrowed in the second quarter when kicker Josh Scobee made a 51-yard field goal. But the Eagles pulled away when Vick found WR Jeremy Maclin on a 16-yard touchdown pass and then a 45-yard touchdown pass in the third quarter. Then Vick scrambled 17 yards into the endzone for a touchdown.

With the win, The Eagles not only improved to 2–1, but also got their first-ever win over the Jaguars in four games.

=== Week 4: vs. Washington Redskins ===
Week 4: Washington Redskins at Philadelphia Eagles – Game summary

Quarter	1	2	3	4	Total
Redskins	14	3	0	0	17
Eagles	0	6	0	6	12

at Lincoln Financial Field, Philadelphia, Pennsylvania

- Date: October 3
- Game time: 4:15 pm. EDT
- Game weather: 61 °F (16 °C), (Cloudy)
- Game attendance: 69,144
- Referee: Alberto Riveron
- TV announcers (FOX): Joe Buck, Troy Aikman and Pam Oliver
- Recap

Game information

First quarter

- WAS – Ryan Torain 12-yard run (Graham Gano kick), Redskins 7–0, Drive: 3 plays, 39 yards, 1:09.
- WAS – Chris Cooley 31-yard pass from Donovan McNabb (Graham Gano kick), Redskins 14–0, Drive: 9 plays, 78 yards, 4:25.

Second quarter

- PHI – David Akers 49-yard field goal, Redskins 14–3, Drive: 10 plays, 43 yards, 4:52.
- WAS – Graham Gano 26-yard field goal, Redskins 17–3, Drive: 11 plays, 72 yards, 5:44.
- PHI – David Akers 23-yard field goal, Redskins 17–6, Drive: 16 plays, 69 yards, 8:52.

Third quarter

- No scoring plays

Fourth quarter

- PHI – Brent Celek 5-yard pass from Kevin Kolb (pass failed), Redskins 17–12, Drive: 9 plays, 65 yards, 3:31.

Top passers

- WAS – Donovan McNabb – 8/19, 125 yards, 1 touchdown, 1 interception
- PHI – Kevin Kolb – 22/35, 201 yards, 1 touchdown, 1 interception

Top rushers

- WAS – Ryan Torain – 18 rushes, 70 yards, 1 touchdown
- PHI – LeSean McCoy – 16 rushes, 64 yards

Top receivers

- WAS – Anthony Armstrong – 1 reception, 57 yards
- PHI – LeSean McCoy – 12 receptions, 110 yards

Top tacklers

- WAS – London Fletcher – 10 tackles, 2 assists
- PHI – Quintin Mikell – 7 tackles

Coming off their dominating road win over the Jaguars, the Eagles went home for their Week 4 NFC East duel with the Washington Redskins, as quarterback Donovan McNabb made his highly anticipated return to Philadelphia.

The Eagles trailed in the first quarter as Redskins running back Ryan Torain got a 12-yard touchdown run, followed by McNabb's 31-yard touchdown pass to tight end Chris Cooley. Philadelphia answered in the second quarter with kicker David Akers making a 49-yard field goal, but Washington came right back with kicker Graham Gano's 26-yard field goal. Afterwards, the Eagles closed out the half with Akers' 23-yard field goal. After a scoreless third quarter, Philadelphia tried to rally in the fourth quarter as quarterback Kevin Kolb hooked up with tight end Brent Celek. However, the Redskins' defense prevented any further progress.

With the loss, the Eagles fell to 2–2.

=== Week 5: at San Francisco 49ers ===
Week 5: Philadelphia Eagles at San Francisco 49ers – Game summary

Quarter	1	2	3	4	Total
Eagles	7	10	0	10	27
49ers	7	3	0	14	24

at Candlestick Park, San Francisco, California

- Date: October 10
- Game time: 8:20 pm. EDT/5:20 p.m. PDT
- Game weather: 71 °F (22 °C), clear skies, sunny
- Game attendance: 69,732
- Referee: Walt Anderson
- TV announcers (NBC): Al Michaels, Cris Collinsworth, and Andrea Kremer
- Recap

Game information

First quarter

- SF – Michael Crabtree 7-yard pass from Alex Smith (Joe Nedney kick), 49ers 7–0, Drive: 11 plays, 51 yards, 7:07.
- PHI – Brent Celek 8-yard pass from Kevin Kolb (David Akers kick), Tied 7–7, Drive: 10 plays, 75 yards, 5:30.

Second quarter

- PHI – David Akers 33-yard field goal, Eagles 10–7, Drive: 7 plays, 31 yards, 3:31.
- PHI – LeSean McCoy 29-yard run, (David Akers kick), Eagles 17–7, Drive: 3 plays, 53 yards, 1:10.
- SF – Joe Nedney 50-yard field goal, Eagles 17–10, Drive: 7 plays, 48 yards, 1:10.

Third quarter

- No scoring plays

Fourth quarter

- PHI – Quintin Mikell 52-yard fumble return (David Akers kick), Eagles 24–10.
- SF – Vernon Davis 7-yard pass from Alex Smith (Joe Nedney kick), Eagles 24–17, Drive: 6 plays, 69 yards, 3:35.
- PHI – David Akers 45-yard field goal, Eagles 27–17, Drive: 6 plays, 37 yards, 3:00.
- SF – Frank Gore 1-yard pass from Alex Smith (Joe Nedney kick), Eagles 27–24, Drive: 7 plays, 36 yards, 2:33.

Top passers

- PHI – Kevin Kolb – 21/31, 253 yards, 1 touchdown
- SF – Alex Smith – 25/39, 309 yards, 3 touchdowns, 2 interceptions

Top rushers

- PHI – LeSean McCoy – 18 rushes, 92 yards, 1 touchdown
- SF – Frank Gore – 18 rushes, 52 yards

Top receivers

- PHI – Jeremy Maclin – 6 receptions, 95 yards
- SF – Michael Crabtree – 9 receptions, 105 yards, 1 touchdown

Top tacklers

- PHI – Quintin Mikell – 8 tackles
- SF – Takeo Spikes – 8 tackles

Hoping to rebound from their divisional home loss to the Redskins, the Eagles flew to Candlestick Park for a Week 5 Sunday night duel with the San Francisco 49ers. Kevin Kolb was back under center for the eagles in this game. Philadelphia trailed early in the first quarter as 49ers quarterback Alex Smith completed a 7-yard touchdown pass to wide receiver Michael Crabtree, yet the Eagles responded with quarterback Kevin Kolb finding tight end Brent Celek on an 8-yard touchdown pass. Philadelphia would take the lead in the second quarter as kicker David Akers booted a 33-yard field goal, followed a 39-yard touchdown run from running back LeSean McCoy. Afterwards, San Francisco would close out the half with a 50-yard field goal from kicker Joe Nedney. After a scoreless third quarter, the Eagles added onto their lead in the fourth quarter as safety Quintin Mikell returned a fumble 52 yards for a touchdown. The 49ers began to rally as Smith connected a 7-yard touchdown pass to tight end Vernon Davis, yet Akers came right back as he gave Philadelphia a 45-yard field goal. San Francisco tried to rally as Smith completed a 1-yard touchdown pass to running back Frank Gore, yet Philadelphia's defense held on to preserve the victory.

With the win, the Eagles improved to 3–2.

=== Week 6: vs. Atlanta Falcons ===
Week 6: Atlanta Falcons at Philadelphia Eagles – Game summary

Quarter	1	2	3	4	Total
Falcons	0	7	3	7	17
Eagles	14	7	7	3	31

at Lincoln Financial Field, Philadelphia, Pennsylvania

- Date: October 17
- Game time: 1:00 pm. EDT
- Game weather: 70 °F (21 °C), (Sunny)
- Game attendance: 69,144
- Referee: Walt Coleman
- TV announcers (Fox): Kenny Albert, Daryl Johnston and Tony Siragusa
- Recap

Game information

First quarter

- PHI – DeSean Jackson 31-yard run (David Akers kick), Eagles 7–0, Drive: 2 plays, 53 yards, 0:50.
- PHI – DeSean Jackson 34-yard pass from Kevin Kolb (David Akers kick), Eagles 14–0, Drive: 6 plays, 69 yards, 2:28.

Second quarter

- PHI – Jeremy Maclin 8-yard pass from Kevin Kolb (David Akers kick), Eagles 21–0, Drive: 7 plays, 34 yards, 2:59.
- ATL – Tony Gonzalez 1-yard pass from Matt Ryan (Matt Bryant kick), Eagles 21–7, Drive: 4 plays, 31 yards, 0:38.

Third quarter

- ATL – Matt Bryant 26-yard field goal, Eagles 21–10, Drive: 14 plays, 65 yards, 6:26.
- PHI – Jeremy Maclin 83-yard pass from Kevin Kolb (David Akers kick), Eagles 28–10, Drive: 2 plays, 80 yards, 0:48.

Fourth quarter

- ATL – Tony Gonzalez 13-yard pass from Matt Ryan (Matt Bryant kick), Eagles 28–17, Drive: 7 plays, 73 yards, 1:41.
- PHI – David Akers 30-yard field goal, Eagles 31–17, Drive: 7 plays, 32 yards, 2:39.

Top passers

- ATL – Matt Ryan – 23/42, 250 yards, 2 touchdowns, 1 interception
- PHI – Kevin Kolb – 23/29, 326 yards, 3 touchdowns, 1 interception

Top rushers

- ATL – Michael Turner – 15 rushes, 45 yards
- PHI – LeSean McCoy – 21 rushes, 64 yards

Top receivers

- ATL – Michael Jenkins – 5 receptions, 99 yards
- PHI – Jeremy Maclin – 7 receptions, 159 yards, 2 touchdowns

Top tacklers

- ATL – Curtis Lofton – 11 tackles, 3 assists
- PHI – Stewart Bradley – 5 tackles, 2 sacks, 1 forced fumble

The Eagles' sixth game was an NFC duel against the Falcons at home. In the first quarter the Eagles struck first as WR DeSean Jackson got an early touchdown on a 31-yard run. Later in the quarter QB Kevin Kolb connected to him on a 34-yard TD pass. The Eagles continued to dominate when Kolb found WR Jeremy Maclin on an 8-yard TD pass. The Falcons replied with QB Matt Ryan making a 1-yard TD pass to TE Tony Gonzalez. This was followed in the third quarter by kicker Matt Bryant hitting a 26-yard field goal. However, the Eagles continued to score when Kolb found Maclin again on an 83-yard TD pass. The Falcons replied with Ryan making a 13-yard TD pass to Gonzalez. The Eagles pulled away with kicker David Akers making a 30-yard field goal.

With the win, the Eagles improved to 4–2.

=== Week 7: at Tennessee Titans ===
Week 7: Philadelphia Eagles at Tennessee Titans – Game summary

Quarter	1	2	3	4	Total
Eagles	0	13	3	3	19
Titans	0	7	3	27	37

at LP Field, Nashville, Tennessee

- Date: October 24
- Game time: 1:00 pm. EDT/12:00 p.m. CDT
- Game weather: 78 °F (26 °C) (Cloudy)
- Game attendance: 69,143
- Referee: Ed Hochuli
- TV announcers (Fox): Kenny Albert, Daryl Johnston and Tony Siragusa
- Recap

Game information

First quarter

Second quarter

- PHI – David Akers 25-yard field goal, Eagles 3–0, Drive: 14 plays, 45 yards, 7:26.
- TEN – Kenny Britt 26-yard pass from Kerry Collins (Rob Bironas kick), Titans 7–3, Drive: 5 plays, 45 yards, 1:28.
- PHI – Riley Cooper 5-yard pass from Kevin Kolb (David Akers kick), Eagles 10–7, Drive: 10 plays, 80 yards, 4:33.
- PHI – David Akers 46-yard field goal, Eagles 13–7, Drive: 7 plays, 29 yards, 1:06.

Third quarter

- PHI – David Akers 46-yard field goal, Eagles 16–7, Drive: 9 plays, 47 yards, 3:46.
- TEN – Rob Bironas 41-yard field goal, Eagles 16–10, Drive: 9 plays, 74 yards, 4:33.

Fourth quarter

- PHI – David Akers 28-yard field goal, Eagles 19–10, Drive: 7 plays, 35 yards, 2:52.
- TEN – Kenny Britt 80-yard pass from Kerry Collins (Rob Bironas kick), Eagles 19–17, Drive: 1 plays, 80 yards, 0:13.
- TEN – Rob Bironas 38-yard field goal, Titans 20–19, Drive: 6 plays, 46 yards, 2:40.
- TEN – Kenny Britt 16-yard pass from Kerry Collins (Rob Bironas kick), Titans 27–19, Drive: 6 plays, 53 yards, 2:27.
- TEN – Rob Bironas 33-yard field goal, Titans 30–19, Drive: 7 plays, 18 yards, 3:15.
- TEN – Cortland Finnegan 41-yard interception return (Rob Bironas kick), Titans 37–19.

Top passers

- PHI – Kevin Kolb – 26/48, 231 yards, 1 touchdown, 2 interceptions
- TEN – Kerry Collins – 17/31, 276 yards, 3 touchdowns, 2 interceptions

Top rushers

- PHI – LeSean McCoy – 16 rushes, 48 yards
- TEN – Chris Johnson – 24 rushes, 66 yards

Top receivers

- PHI – Jason Avant – 6 receptions, 60 yards
- TEN – Kenny Britt – 7 receptions, 225 yards, 3 touchdowns

Top tacklers

- PHI – Nate Allen – 6 tackles, 2 assists
- TEN – Stephen Tulloch – 10 tackles, 2 assists

Hoping to increase their winning streak the Eagles flew to LP Field for an Interconference duel with the Titans. In the second quarter the Eagles took the lead with kicker David Akers making a 25-yard field goal. But they trailed when QB Kerry Collins completed a 26-yard TD pass to WR Kenny Britt. The Eagles replied with QB Kevin Kolb making a 5-yard TD pass to WR Riley Cooper, followed by kicker David Akers hitting a 46-yard field goal. In the third quarter the Eagles increased their lead with Akers making a 46-yard field goal. The Titans answered with kicker Rob Bironas nailing a 41-yard field goal, but the Eagles continued to score in the 4th with Akers hitting a 28-yard field goal. Eventually, they fell behind with Collins completing an 80-yard TD pass to Britt, followed by Bironas hitting a 38-yard field goal. Collins found Britt for the third time in the game on a 16-yard TD pass, and then Bironas made a 33-yard field goal. The Eagles had more problems when Kolb's pass was intercepted by CB Cortland Finnegan and returned 41 yards for a touchdown.

With the loss, the Eagles went into their bye week at 4–3. Andy Reid announced that Michael Vick would regain the starting quarterback position after the bye week, effectively ending any quarterback controversy

=== Week 9: vs. Indianapolis Colts ===
Week 9: Indianapolis Colts at Philadelphia Eagles – Game summary

Quarter	1	2	3	4	Total
Colts	0	17	0	7	24
Eagles	10	6	3	7	26

at Lincoln Financial Field; Philadelphia

- Date: November 7
- Game time: 4:15 pm EST
- Game weather: 46 °F (8 °C) (Sunny)
- Game attendance: 69,144
- Referee: Carl Cheffers
- TV announcers (CBS): Jim Nantz and Phil Simms
- Recap

Game information

First quarter

- PHI – (13:18) DeSean Jackson 9-yard reception from Michael Vick (David Akers kick). Drive: 3 plays, 72 yards, 1:46. (Eagles 7–0)
- PHI – (11:26) David Akers 22-yard field goal. Drive: 4 plays, 4 yards, 1:30. (Eagles 10–0)
- PHI – (2:15) David Akers 21-yard field goal. Drive: 9 plays, 96 yards, 3:30. (Eagles 13–0)

Second quarter

- IND – (12:05) Jacob Tamme 3-yard reception from Peyton Manning (Adam Vinatieri kick). Drive: 11 plays, 76 yards, 5:13. (Eagles 13–7)
- PHI – (6:29) David Akers 31-yard field goal. Drive: 10 plays, 55 yards, 5:33. (Eagles 16–7)
- IND – (2:01) Javarris James 6-yard run (Adam Vinatieri kick) Drive: 9 plays, 80 yards, 4:27. (Eagles 16–14)
- IND – (0:07) Adam Vinatieri 37-yard field goal Drive: 7 plays, 31 yards, 1:01. (Colts 17–16)

Third quarter

- PHI – (7:33) David Akers 44-yard field goal Drive: 8 plays, 27 yards, 3:32. (Eagles 19–17)

Fourth quarter

- PHI – (13:47) Michael Vick 1-yard run from (David Akers kick) Drive: 10 plays, 80 yards, 5:21. (Eagles 26–17)
- IND – (1:50) Javarris James 1-yard run (Adam Vinatieri kick) Drive: 16 plays, 85 yards, 4:07. (Eagles 26–24)

Top passers

- IND – Peyton Manning – 31/51, 294 yards, 1 TD, 2 INT
- PHI – Michael Vick – 17/29, 218 yards, 1 TD, 0 INT

Top rushers

- IND – Donald Brown – 15 carries, 50 yards, 0 TD
- PHI – LeSean McCoy – 16 carries, 95 yards, 0 TD

Top receivers

- IND – Jacob Tamme – 11 receptions, 108 yards, 1 TD
- PHI – DeSean Jackson – 7 receptions, 109 yards, 1 TD

Top tacklers

- IND – Aaron Francisco (8)
- PHI – Stewart Bradley (8)

The Eagles' eighth game was an Interconference duel with the Colts at home. In the first quarter the Eagles Took the lead as QB Michael Vick completed a 9-yard TD pass to WR DeSean Jackson. This was followed by kicker David Akers' 22- and 21-yard field goals. The Colts replied with QB Peyton Manning completing a 3-yard TD pass to TE Jacob Tamme. The Eagles extended their lead after Akers nailed a 31-yard field goal. They eventually trailed by 1 point after RB Javarris James got a 6-yard TD run, followed by kicker Adam Vinatieri making a 37-yard field goal. The Eagles got the lead back in the 3rd quarter after Akers got a 44-yard field goal, followed by Vick scrambling a yard to the endzone for a touchdown. The Colts narrowed the lead when James got a 1-yard TD run, but in the final minute Manning lofted a deep pass that was intercepted by Asante Samuel.

With the close win, the Eagles improved to 5–3. It was also the first win over the Colts for the Eagles since the 1993 season.

=== Week 10: at Washington Redskins ===
Week 10: Philadelphia Eagles at Washington Redskins – Game summary

Quarter	1	2	3	4	Total
Eagles	28	17	14	0	59
Redskins	0	14	7	7	28

at FedExField, Landover, Maryland

- Date: November 15
- Game time: 8:30 pm. EST
- Game weather: 52 °F (11 °C), cloudy/rain
- Game attendance: 84,912
- Referee: Clete Blakeman
- TV announcers (ESPN): Mike Tirico, Ron Jaworski, Jon Gruden, Michele Tafoya and Suzy Kolber
- Recap

Game information

First quarter

- PHI – DeSean Jackson 88-yard pass from Michael Vick (David Akers kick), Eagles 7–0, Drive: 1 plays, 88 yards, 0:18.
- PHI – Michael Vick 7-yard run (David Akers kick), Eagles 14–0, Drive: 5 plays, 63 yards, 2:34.
- PHI – LeSean McCoy 11-yard pass from Michael Vick (David Akers kick), Eagles 21–0, Drive: 6 plays, 37 yards, 3:50.
- PHI – Jerome Harrison 50-yard run (David Akers kick), Eagles 28–0, Drive: 3 plays, 77 yards, 1:34.

Second quarter

- PHI – Jeremy Maclin 48-yard pass from Michael Vick (David Akers kick), Eagles 35–0, Drive: 3 plays, 58 yards, 0:57.
- WAS – Darrel Young 3-yard pass from Donovan McNabb (Graham Gano kick), Eagles 35–7, Drive: 2 plays, 74 yards, 0:36.
- WAS – Keiland Williams6-yard pass from Donovan McNabb (Graham Gano kick), Eagles 35–14, Drive: 3 plays, 81 yards, 1:24.
- PHI – Michael Vick 6-yard run (David Akers kick), Eagles 42–14, Drive: 5 plays, 28 yards, 1:34.
- PHI – David Akers 48-yard field goal, Eagles 45–14, Drive: 5 plays, 33 yards, 2:15.

Third quarter

- WAS – Keiland Williams 4-yard run (Graham Gano kick), Eagles 45–21, Drive: 8 plays, 56 yards, 3:33.
- PHI – Jason Avant 3-yard pass from Michael Vick (David Akers kick), Eagles 52–21, Drive: 11 plays, 71 yards, 5:12.
- PHI – Dimitri Patterson 40-yard interception return (David Akers kick), Eagles 59–21.

Fourth quarter

- WAS – Keiland Williams 32-yard run (Graham Gano kick), Eagles 59–28, Drive: 7 plays, 84 yards, 2:48.

Top passers

- PHI – Michael Vick – 20/28, 333 yards, 4 touchdowns
- WAS – Donovan McNabb – 17/31, 295 yards, 2 touchdowns, 3 interceptions

Top rushers

- PHI – Jerome Harrison – 11 rushes, 109 yards, 1 touchdown
- WAS – Keiland Williams – 16 rushes, 89 yards, 2 touchdowns

Top receivers

- PHI – DeSean Jackson – 2 receptions, 98 yards, 1 touchdown
- WAS – Anthony Armstrong – 3 receptions, 83 yards

Top tacklers

- PHI – Stewart Bradley – 3 tackles, 5 assists
- WAS – London Fletcher – 9 tackles, 4 assists

Coming off their home win over the Colts, the Eagles flew to FedExField for a Week 10 NFC East rematch with the Washington Redskins on Monday night. Philadelphia wasted no time kicking off the first quarter as on the very first play of the game, quarterback Michael Vick found wide receiver DeSean Jackson on an 88-yard touchdown pass. Afterwards, the Eagles added onto their lead with Vick's 7-yard touchdown run, followed by Vick finding running back LeSean McCoy on an 11-yard touchdown pass, along with running back Jerome Harrison's 50-yard touchdown run. Philadelphia continued its dominating night in the second quarter as Vick hooked up with wide receiver Jeremy Maclin on a 48-yard touchdown pass. The Redskins would answer with former Eagles quarterback Donovan McNabb completing a 3-yard touchdown pass to fullback Darrel Young, followed by a 3-yard touchdown pass to running back Keiland Williams. Philadelphia responded with Vick's 6-yard touchdown run, followed by kicker David Akers booting a 48-yard field goal.

Washington began the third quarter with Williams getting a 4-yard touchdown run. Afterwards, the Eagles went back to work as Vick hooked up with wide receiver Jason Avant on a 3-yard touchdown pass, followed by cornerback Dimitri Patterson returning an interception 40 yards for a touchdown. The Redskins tried to rally in the fourth quarter as Williams got a 32-yard touchdown run, but Philadelphia's defense (combined with their 31-point lead) held on to preserve the victory.

With the win, the Eagles improve to 6–3.

The Philadelphia Eagles scored 59 points and 8 touchdowns, including 4 passing TDs and 3 rushing TDs. They racked up 592 yards of total offense, including 260 rushing yards and 332 passing yards. They were 4/4 in Red Zone Efficiency and 4/4 in Goal-to-Go Efficiency, were 8/13 in Third-Down Conversions and had 28 first downs. Michael Vick (20/28, 333 yards, 4 TDs, 8 carries, 80 yards, 2 TDs) became the first player in NFL history to have 300+ yards passing, 50+ yards rushing, 4+ passing touchdowns, and 2+ rushing touchdowns in the same game. This game became known as Monday Night Massacre.

=== Week 11: vs. New York Giants ===
Week 11: New York Giants at Philadelphia Eagles – Game summary

Quarter	1	2	3	4	Total
Giants	0	3	7	7	17
Eagles	7	6	3	11	27

at Lincoln Financial Field, Philadelphia

- Date: November 21
- Game time: 8:20 pm. EST
- Game weather: 43 °F (6 °C) (Partly Cloudy)
- Game attendance: 69,144
- Referee: Ron Winter
- TV announcers (NBC): Al Michaels, Cris Collinsworth and Andrea Kremer
- Game Book Recap

Game information

First quarter

- PHI – Michael Vick 4-yard run (David Akers kick), Eagles 7–0, Drive: 13 plays, 68 yards, 7:09.

Second quarter

- NYG – Lawrence Tynes 24-yard field goal, Eagles 7–3, Drive: 14 plays, 74 yards, 8:06.
- PHI – David Akers 38-yard field goal, Eagles 10–3, Drive: 4 plays, 3 yards, 1:18.
- PHI – David Akers 24-yard field goal, Eagles 13–3, Drive: 4 plays, 7 yards, 1:33.

Third quarter

- PHI – David Akers 28-yard field goal, Eagles 16–3, Drive: 14 plays, 82 yards, 8:22.
- NYG – Travis Beckum 2-yard pass from Eli Manning (Lawrence Tynes kick), Eagles 16–10, Drive: 9 plays, 68 yards, 6:11.

Fourth quarter

- NYG – Derek Hagan 5-yard pass from Eli Manning (Lawrence Tynes kick), Giants 17–16, Drive: 2 plays, 27 yards, 0:40.
- PHI – LeSean McCoy 50-yard run (Michael Vick – Jason Avant pass), Eagles 24–17, Drive: 7 plays, 90 yards, 3:27.
- PHI – David Akers 30-yard field goal, Eagles 27–17, Drive: 6 plays, 48 yards, 2:29.

Top passers

- NYG – Eli Manning – 20/33, 147 yards, 2 touchdowns, 3 interceptions
- PHI – Michael Vick – 24/38, 258 yards

Top rushers

- NYG – Ahmad Bradshaw – 12 rushes, 29 yards
- PHI – LeSean McCoy – 14 rushes, 111 yards, 1 touchdown

Top receivers

- NYG – Hakeem Nicks – 6 receptions, 65 yards
- PHI – Jeremy Maclin – 9 receptions, 120 yards

Top tacklers

- NYG – Terrell Thomas – 9 tackles, 1 assist
- PHI – Dimitri Patterson – 6 tackles, 1 assist

Coming off their impressive win over the Redskins, the Eagles went home for a Week 11 NFC East duel with the New York Giants on Sunday night. Philadelphia delivered the game's opening strike with a 4-yard touchdown run from quarterback Michael Vick. The Giants answered in the second quarter with kicker Lawrence Tynes getting a 24-yard field goal, yet the Eagles replied with a 38-yard and a 24-yard field goal from kicker David Akers.

Philadelphia added onto their lead in the third quarter with Akers' 28-yard field goal, yet New York replied with quarterback Eli Manning completed a 2-yard touchdown pass to tight end Travis Beckum. The Giants took the lead in the fourth quarter as Manning completed a 5-yard touchdown pass to wide receiver Derek Hagan, yet the Eagles struck back with a 50-yard touchdown run from running back LeSean McCoy (with Vick completing a 2-point conversion pass to wide receiver Jason Avant). Afterwards, Philadelphia pulled away with Akers' 50-yard field goal.

With the win, the Eagles improved to 7–3.

=== Week 12: at Chicago Bears ===
Week 12: Philadelphia Eagles at Chicago Bears – Game summary

Quarter	1	2	3	4	Total
Eagles	3	10	0	13	26
Bears	14	7	10	0	31

at Soldier Field, Chicago

- Date: November 28
- Game time: 4:15 pm. EST/3:15 pm. CST
- Game weather: 45 °F (7 °C), partly cloudy
- Game attendance: 62,147
- Referee: Scott Green
- TV announcers (Fox): Kenny Albert, Daryl Johnston and Tony Siragusa
- Recap

Game information

First quarter

- PHI – David Akers 45-yard field goal, Eagles 3–0, Drive: 6 plays, 23 yards, 2:24.
- CHI – Earl Bennett 10-yard pass from Jay Cutler (Robbie Gould kick), Bears 7–3, Drive: 4 plays, 79 yards, 1:55.
- CHI – Johnny Knox 20-yard pass from Jay Cutler (Robbie Gould kick), Bears 14–3, Drive: 4 plays, 59 yards, 2:13.

Second quarter

- PHI – Jeremy Maclin 8-yard pass from Michael Vick (David Akers kick), Bears 14–10, Drive: 10 plays, 65 yards, 4:07.
- PHI – David Akers 36-yard field goal, Bears 14–13, Drive: 8 plays, 41 yards, 3:25.
- CHI – Earl Bennett 6-yard pass from Jay Cutler (Robbie Gould kick), Bears 21–13, Drive: 6 plays, 63 yards, 1:12.

Third quarter

- CHI – Greg Olsen 9-yard pass from Jay Cutler (Robbie Gould kick), Bears 28–13, Drive: 3 plays, 54 yards, 1:31.
- CHI – Robbie Gould 23-yard field goal, Bears 31–13, Drive: 17 plays, 83 yards, 10:05.

Fourth quarter

- PHI – David Akers 22-yard field goal, Bears 31–16, Drive: 11 plays, 65 yards, 4:35.
- PHI – David Akers 36-yard field goal, Bears 31–19, Drive: 8 plays, 58 yards, 3:32.
- PHI – Brent Celek 30-yard pass from Michael Vick (David Akers kick), Bears 31–26, Drive: 9 plays, 86 yards, 2:30.

Top passers

- PHI – Michael Vick – 29/44, 333 yards, 2 touchdowns, 1 interception
- CHI – Jay Cutler – 14/21, 247 yards, 4 touchdowns

Top rushers

- PHI – LeSean McCoy – 10 rushes, 53 yards
- CHI – Matt Forte – 14 rushes, 117 yards

Top receivers

- PHI – Jason Avant – 8 receptions, 83 yards
- CHI – Devin Hester – 3 receptions, 86 yards

Top tacklers

- PHI – Stewart Bradley, Ernie Sims – 5 tackles
- CHI – Brian Urlacher – 9 tackles, 1 assist

Coming off their win over the Giants the Eagles flew to Soldier Field for an NFC duel with the Bears. The Eagles had the early advantage with kicker David Akers nailing a 45-yard field goal. It soon disappeared after QB Jay Cutler completed a 10 and a 20-yard TD pass to wide receivers Earl Bennett and Johnny Knox respectively. The Eagles tried to cut the lead with QB Michael Vick getting an 8-yard TD pass to WR Jeremy Maclin, followed by Akers hitting a 36-yard field goal. But they fell further behind as Cutler got a 6 and a 9-yard TD pass to Bennett and Greg Olsen. This was followed by kicker Robbie Gould making a 23-yard field goal. The Eagles tried to narrow the lead as Akers got a 22 and a 36-yard field goal, followed by Vick throwing a 30-yard TD pass to TE Brent Celek, but the Bears' defense prevented any more scoring chances.

With the loss, the Eagles fell to 7–4.

=== Week 13: vs. Houston Texans ===
Week 13: Houston Texans at Philadelphia Eagles – Game summary

Quarter	1	2	3	4	Total
Texans	3	7	14	0	24
Eagles	7	13	0	14	34

at Lincoln Financial Field, Philadelphia

- Date: December 2
- Game time: 8:20 pm. EST
- Game weather: 35 °F (2 °C) (Clear)
- Game attendance: 69,144
- Referee: Walt Anderson
- TV announcers (NFLN): Bob Papa, Matt Millen and Joe Theismann
- Recap

Game information

First quarter

- PHI – LeSean McCoy 1-yard pass from Michael Vick (David Akers kick), Eagles 7–0, Drive: 11 plays, 88 yards, 7:04.
- HOU – Neil Rackers 48-yard field goal, Eagles 7–3, Drive: 7 plays, 39 yards, 3:01.

Second quarter

- PHI – LeSean McCoy 4-yard run (David Akers kick), Eagles 14–3, Drive: 11 plays, 72 yards, 5:25.
- PHI – David Akers 36-yard field goal, Eagles 17–3, Drive: 7 plays, 51 yards, 3:16.
- HOU – Jacoby Jones 8-yard pass from Matt Schaub (Neil Rackers kick), Eagles 17–10, Drive: 8 plays, 80 yards, 3:57.
- PHI – David Akers 22-yard field goal, Eagles 20–10, Drive: 7 plays, 14 yards, 0:59.

Third quarter

- HOU – Arian Foster 13-yard pass from Matt Schaub (Neil Rackers kick), Eagles 20–17, Drive: 11 plays, 79 yards, 6:11.
- HOU – Arian Foster 3-yard run (Neil Rackers kick), Texans 24–20, Drive: 13 plays, 86 yards, 6:23.

Fourth quarter

- PHI – Michael Vick 2-yard run (David Akers kick), Eagles 27–24, Drive: 6 plays, 60 yards, 2:46.
- PHI – Owen Schmitt 5-yard pass from Michael Vick (David Akers kick), Eagles 34–24, Drive: 8 plays, 72 yards, 5:52.

Top passers

- HOU – Matt Schaub – 22/36, 337 yards, 2 touchdowns, 1 interception
- PHI – Michael Vick – 22/33, 302 yards, 2 touchdowns, 1 interception

Top rushers

- HOU – Arian Foster – 22 rushes, 83 yards, 1 touchdown
- PHI – Michael Vick – 10 rushes, 48 yards

Top receivers

- HOU – Andre Johnson – 6 receptions, 149 yards
- PHI – LeSean McCoy – 8 receptions, 86 yards, 1 touchdown

Top tacklers

- HOU – Jason Allen – 9 tackles, 1 interception
- PHI – Quintin Mikell – 7 tackles

Hoping to rebound from their road loss to the Bears, the Eagles went home for a Week 13 interconference duel with the Houston Texans on Thursday night. Philadelphia delivered the opening strike in the first quarter as quarterback Michael Vick found running back LeSean McCoy on a 1-yard touchdown pass. The Texans replied with kicker Neil Rackers getting a 48-yard field goal, yet the Eagles answered in the second quarter with a 4-yard touchdown run from McCoy, followed by a 36-yard field goal from kicker David Akers. Houston struck back with quarterback Matt Schaub completing an 8-yard touchdown pass to wide receiver Jacoby Jones. Philadelphia would close out the half with a 22-yard field goal from Akers.

The Texans took the third quarter with running back Arian Foster catching a 13-yard touchdown pass from Schaub and running for a 3-yard touchdown run. The Eagles regained the lead with Vick's 2-yard touchdown run and his 5-yard touchdown pass to fullback Owen Schmitt. Afterwards, Philadelphia's defense prevented any comeback attempt from Houston.

With the win, the Eagles improved to 8–4.

=== Week 14: at Dallas Cowboys ===
Week 14: Philadelphia Eagles at Dallas Cowboys – Game summary

Quarter	1	2	3	4	Total
Eagles	7	7	3	13	30
Cowboys	7	3	10	7	27

at Cowboys Stadium, Arlington, Texas

- Date: December 12
- Game time: 8:20 pm. EST/7:20 pm. CST
- Game weather: None (Dome Closed)
- Game attendance: 85,673
- Referee: Terry McAulay
- TV announcers (NBC): Al Michaels, Cris Collinsworth and Andrea Kremer
- Recap

Game information

First quarter

- PHI – Michael Vick 1-yard run (David Akers kick), Eagles 7–0, Drive: 6 plays, 73 yards, 3:13.
- DAL – Jason Witten 1-yard pass from Jon Kitna (David Buehler kick), Tied 7–7, Drive: 10 plays, 77 yards, 6:14.

Second quarter

- PHI – Todd Herremans 2-yard pass from Michael Vick (David Akers kick), Eagles 14–7, Drive: 6 plays, 51 yards, 3:00.
- DAL – David Buehler 50-yard field goal, Eagles 14–10, Drive: 7 plays, 36 yards, 1:34.

Third quarter

- DAL – David Buehler 43-yard field goal, Eagles 14–13, Drive: 10 plays, 42 yards, 4:42.
- DAL – Felix Jones 3-yard run (David Buehler kick), Cowboys 20–14, Drive: 3 plays, 37 yards, 1:34.
- PHI – David Akers 39-yard field goal, Cowboys 20–17, Drive: 5 plays, 56 yards, 2:38.

Fourth quarter

- PHI – David Akers 50-yard field goal, Tied 20–20, Drive: 10 plays, 28 yards, 4:18.
- PHI – DeSean Jackson 91-yard pass from Michael Vick, Eagles 27–20, Drive: 1 plays, 91 yards, 0:19.
- PHI – David Akers 28-yard field goal, Eagles 30–20, Drive: 5 plays, 22 yards, 2:54.
- DAL – Jason Witten 22-yard pass from Jon Kitna (David Buehler kick), Eagles 30–27, Drive: 9 plays, 80 yards, 3:55.

Top passers

- PHI – Michael Vick – 16/26, 270 yards, 2 touchdowns, 2 interceptions
- DAL – Jon Kitna – 24/35, 242 yards, 2 touchdowns, 2 interceptions

Top rushers

- PHI – LeSean McCoy – 16 rushes, 149 yards
- DAL – Felix Jones – 13 rushes, 41 yards, 1 touchdown

Top receivers

- PHI – DeSean Jackson – 4 receptions, 210 yards, 1 touchdown
- DAL – Jason Witten – 7 receptions, 69 yards, 2 touchdowns

Top tacklers

- PHI – Jamar Chaney – 5 tackles, 2 assists
- DAL – Terence Newman – 7 tackles

Coming off their win over the Texans, the Eagles flew to Cowboys Stadium for a Week 14 NFC East duel with the Dallas Cowboys on Sunday night. Philadelphia delivered the game's opening strike with a 1-yard touchdown run from quarterback Michael Vick, but the Cowboys answered with quarterback Jon Kitna completing a 1-yard touchdown pass to tight end Jason Witten. The Eagles regained the lead in the second quarter with Vick locating offensive guard Todd Herremans on a 1-yard touchdown pass. Afterwards, Dallas closed out the half with kicker David Buehler making a 50-yard field goal.

The Cowboys took the lead in the third quarter as Buehler got a 43-yard field goal, followed by running back Felix Jones getting a 3-yard touchdown run. Philadelphia struck back with a 39-yard field goal from kicker David Akers. The Eagles tied the game with a 50-yard field goal from Akers, followed by Vick connecting with wide receiver DeSean Jackson on a 91-yard touchdown pass and Akers' 28-yard field goal. Dallas tried to rally as Kitna completed a 22-yard touchdown pass to Witten, yet the Eagles held on for the victory.

With the win, Philadelphia improved to 9–4.

=== Week 15: at New York Giants ===
Week 15: Philadelphia Eagles at New York Giants – Game summary

Quarter	1	2	3	4	Total
Eagles	0	3	7	28	38
Giants	7	17	0	7	31

at New Meadowlands Stadium, East Rutherford, New Jersey

- Date: December 19
- Game time: 1:00 pm. EST
- Game weather: 33 °F (1 °C) (Partly Cloudy)
- Game attendance: 81,223
- Referee: John Parry
- TV announcers (Fox): Joe Buck, Troy Aikman and Pam Oliver
- Game Book, NFL Network Gameday highlights Recap

Game information

First quarter

- NYG – Mario Manningham 35-yard pass from Eli Manning (Lawrence Tynes kick), Giants 7–0, Drive: 9 plays, 71 yards, 4:17.

Second quarter

- PHI – David Akers 34-yard field goal, Giants 7–3, Drive: 5 plays, 29 yards, 2:12.
- NYG – Mario Manningham 33-yard pass from Eli Manning (Lawrence Tynes kick), Giants 14–3, Drive: 8 plays, 73 yards, 4:45.
- NYG – Lawrence Tynes 25-yard field goal, Giants 17–3, Drive: 12 plays, 55 yards, 3:23.
- NYG – Hakeem Nicks 8-yard pass from Eli Manning (Lawrence Tynes kick), Giants 24–3, Drive: 1 plays, 8 yards, 0:04.

Third quarter

- PHI – Jeremy Maclin 8-yard pass from Michael Vick (David Akers kick), Giants 24–10, Drive: 3 plays, 25 yards, 1:04.

Fourth quarter

- NYG – Kevin Boss 8-yard pass from Eli Manning (Lawrence Tynes kick), Giants 31–10, Drive: 7 plays, 47 yards, 4:17.
- PHI – Brent Celek 65-yard pass from Michael Vick (David Akers kick), Giants 31–17, Drive: 2 plays, 75 yards, 0:49.
- PHI – Michael Vick 4-yard run (David Akers kick), Giants 31–24, Drive: 5 plays, 57 yards, 2:00.
- PHI – Jeremy Maclin 13-yard pass from Michael Vick (David Akers kick), Giants 31–31, Drive: 8 plays, 88 yards, 1:45.
- PHI – DeSean Jackson 65-yard punt return (David Akers kick), Giants 38–31.

Top passers

- PHI – Michael Vick – 21/35, 242 yards, 3 touchdowns, 1 interception
- NYG – Eli Manning – 23/39, 289 yards, 4 touchdowns, 1 interception

Top rushers

- PHI – Michael Vick – 10 rushes, 130 yards, 1 touchdown
- NYG – Ahmad Bradshaw – 19 rushes, 66 yards

Top receivers

- PHI – Brent Celek – 2 receptions, 72 yards, 1 touchdown
- NYG – Mario Manningham – 8 receptions, 113 yards, 2 touchdowns

Top tacklers

- PHI – Jamar Chaney – 12 tackles, 4 assists, 1 forced fumble
- NYG – Justin Tuck – 6 tackles, 1 assist, 1.5 sack

Coming off their win over the Cowboys, the Eagles flew to New Meadowlands Stadium for an NFC East rivalry rematch against the New York Giants. In the first quarter the Eagles trailed early as Giants quarterback Eli Manning completed a 35-yard touchdown pass to wide receiver Mario Manningham. The Eagles responded in the second quarter with kicker David Akers getting a 34-yard field goal, but fell further behind after Manning found Manningham on a 33-yard touchdown pass, followed by kicker Lawrence Tynes nailing a 25-yard field goal, then with Manning getting an eight-yard touchdown pass to wide receiver Hakeem Nicks. The Eagles cut the lead with quarterback Michael Vick tossing an eight-yard touchdown pass to wide receiver Jeremy Maclin, but fell further behind with Manning finding tight end Kevin Boss on an eight-yard touchdown pass. However, the Eagles managed to break the lead and tie the game with Vick bombing a 65-yard TD pass to tight end Brent Celek, followed by his four-yard scramble for a touchdown and then his 13-yard touchdown pass to Maclin to tie the game at 31. After the game was tied the Eagles scored to take the lead with DeSean Jackson returning a punt 65 yards for a touchdown as time expired, becoming the first player in NFL history to do so. Fox commentator Joe Buck called the final play with:

And DeSean Jackson, who has averaged, 14th-best in the NFL, 8.7 yards per return, has not returned one for a touchdown this year, waits. And it's a line drive kick. Jackson bobbles, it, and now he has to try and recover. DeSean Jackson GETS A BLOCK! ARE YOU KIDDING?! DeSean Jackson... still not in and now in for the touchdown, no flags! UNBELIEVABLE! NO TIME LEFT! EAGLES WIN!

Eagles broadcasters Merrill Reese and Mike Quick called the play on WYSP-FM in Philadelphia this way:

Fourteen seconds to go. 31–31. Matt Dodge to punt, gets a high snap, gets it away, it's a knuckler. Jackson takes it at the 35, fumbles it, picks it up, looks for running room. He's at the 40, he's at the 45, midfield (Mike Quick: OH!), he's at the 40 (OH!). He's going to go! DeSean Jackson (OH!)! I don't care if he jumps, dives, he's running around and he's in the end zone, and there's no time, and the Eagles win! The Eagles win! (Quick:) This is Miracle at the Meadowlands Number 2!

With the win, the Eagles improved to 10–4.

=== Week 16: vs. Minnesota Vikings ===
Week 16: Minnesota Vikings at Philadelphia Eagles – Game summary

Quarter	1	2	3	4	Total
Vikings	0	7	10	7	24
Eagles	7	0	0	7	14

at Lincoln Financial Field, Philadelphia, Pennsylvania

- Date: December 26 (rescheduled to December 28)
- Game time: 8:20 pm. EST (rescheduled to 8:00 pm. EST)
- Game weather: 32 °F (0 °C) (Clear)
- Game attendance: 69,144
- Referee: Mike Carey
- TV announcers (NBC): Al Michaels, Cris Collinsworth, & Andrea Kremer
- Recap

Game information

First quarter

- PHI – Clay Harbor 3-yard pass from Michael Vick (David Akers kick), Eagles 7–0, Drive: 7 plays, 50 yards, 3:34.

Second quarter

- MIN – Antoine Winfield 45-yard fumble return (Ryan Longwell kick), Tied 7–7.

Third quarter

- MIN – Ryan Longwell 30-yard field goal, Vikings 10–7, Drive: 7 plays, 62 yards, 2:36.
- MIN – Joe Webb 9-yard run (Ryan Longwell kick), Vikings 17–7, Drive: 7 plays, 75 yards, 3:41.

Fourth quarter

- PHI – Michael Vick 10-yard run (David Akers kick), Vikings 17–14, Drive: 12 plays, 53 yards, 4:57.
- MIN – Adrian Peterson 1-yard run (Ryan Longwell kick), Vikings 24–14, Drive: 8 plays, 60 yards, 3:34.

Top passers

- MIN – Joe Webb – 17/26, 195 yards
- PHI – Michael Vick – 25/43, 263 yards, 1 touchdown, 1 interception

Top rushers

- MIN – Adrian Peterson – 22 rushes, 118 yards, 1 touchdown
- PHI – Michael Vick – 8 rushes, 63 yards, 1 touchdown

Top receivers

- MIN – Percy Harvin – 7 receptions, 100 yards
- PHI – Brent Celek – 10 receptions, 97 yards

Top tacklers

- MIN – Antoine Winfield – 8 tackles, 1 assist, 2.0 sacks, 1 forced fumble
- PHI – Quintin Mikell – 9 tackles

Coming off their miracle win over the Giants, the Eagles went home for a Week 16 intraconference duel with the Minnesota Vikings. The game was originally scheduled for 1 pm on Sunday, but was bumped to a Sunday Night Football telecast due to the NFL's Flex Scheduling policy. The NFL wants to ensure that every Sunday night game after Week 11 has playoff implications. In this case, the Eagles had a chance to clinch their first NFC East title since 2006, and the sixth in Reid's 12 years as coach, with a win. However, the game was pushed back to Tuesday due to heavy snow in Philadelphia (see below).

Philadelphia delivered the game's opening punch in the first quarter as quarterback Michael Vick found rookie tight end Clay Harbor on a 3-yard touchdown pass. The Vikings responded in the second quarter with cornerback Antoine Winfield returning a fumble 45 yards for a touchdown.

Minnesota took the lead in the third quarter with kicker Ryan Longwell getting a 30-yard field goal, followed by quarterback Joe Webb getting a 9-yard touchdown run. The Eagles answered in the fourth quarter with Vick's 10-yard touchdown run, but the Vikings pulled away after the Vikings scored a touchdown on a 1-yard run by running back Adrian Peterson.

With the loss, Philadelphia fell to 10–5, and were locked into the #3 playoff seed in the NFC.

==== Postponement ====
The December 2010 North American blizzard postponed the game until Tuesday, December 28, 2010, at 8:00 p.m. out of concern for public safety. The game aired on NBC. The NFL postponed the game shortly after noon, even before there was any snow accumulation in Philadelphia, after Philadelphia Mayor Michael Nutter declared a snow emergency for the city.

Eagles and NFL officials said that the postponement decision was made mainly out of concern for the safety of fans, vendors, suppliers and stadium workers. The game was scheduled to end just before midnight Philadelphia time, during the worst of the storm. Eagles COO Don Smolenski said the possibility of having over 72,000 people (over 69,000 fans plus 3,000 workers) stranded in the brunt of the storm made league and team officials conclude "it just wasn't safe" to play the game on Sunday night. League and team officials were also concerned that emergency vehicles wouldn't be able to make it through safely. Indeed, SEPTA and New Jersey Transit, which are utilized by many Eagles fans coming to and leaving games, were forced to alter or cancel routes due to the storm.

The postponement decision was very unpopular in Philadelphia. Pennsylvania Governor Ed Rendell, the former mayor of Philadelphia and an avid Eagles fan, said that football was a game that was meant to be played in bad weather. DeSean Jackson tweeted, "It's only snow!!!! Let us play... It must be a lot of fun... I'm ready let's get it on!!" The next day, Rendell told WPEN-FM that the postponement was proof that the United States had become "a nation of wusses." The front page of the Philadelphia Daily News had pictures of Nutter, Eagles owner Jeff Lurie, Eagles president Joe Banner and NFL commissioner Roger Goodell in beanie caps, suggesting they were "wimps" for postponing the game. However, Nutter maintained that the city could have had Lincoln Financial Field ready in time for kickoff, and the postponement decision was made by the league and the Eagles.

This was the 20th NFL game to be played on a Tuesday, but the first since 1946. The last Eagles game on a Tuesday was September 26, 1944, when they defeated the Boston Yanks in the season opener. It was also the Yanks first regular season franchise game.

The Giants' loss to the Packers earlier on Sunday gave the Eagles the NFC East title. The Eagles' chances of contending for a first-round bye were ended with the loss to the Vikings coupled with the Bears' win over the Jets.

=== Week 17: vs. Dallas Cowboys ===
Week 17: Dallas Cowboys at Philadelphia Eagles – Game summary

Quarter	1	2	3	4	Total
Cowboys	0	7	0	7	14
Eagles	0	7	0	6	13

at Lincoln Financial Field, Philadelphia, Pennsylvania

- Date: January 2
- Game time: 4:15 pm. EST
- Game weather: 45 °F (7 °C) (Light Rain)
- Referee: Tony Corrente
- TV announcers (FOX): Kenny Albert, Daryl Johnston, and Tony Siragusa

Game information

First quarter

- Neither team scored during the 1st Quarter

Second quarter

- PHI- Kevin Kolb to Chad Hall for 4 yards (David Akers kick) Drive: 7 Plays, 39 Yards; 2:38
- DAL- DeMarcus Ware 17-yard fumble return (David Buehler kick)

Third quarter

- Neither team scored during the Third Quarter

Fourth quarter

- PHI- David Akers 43-yard Field Goal Drive: 6 Plays, 34 Yards; 2:46
- PHI- David Akers 22-yard Field Goal Drive: 5 Plays, 54 Yards; 2:44
- DAL- Jason Witten 4-yard pass from Stephen McGee Drive: 9 Plays, 54 Yards; 1:59

Top passers

- DAL – Stephen McGee- 11/27, 127 yards, 1 touchdown
- PHI – Kevin Kolb- 18/36, 162 yards, 1 touchdown, 3 interceptions

Top rushers

- DAL – Felix Jones- 11 Rushes, 81 Yards
- PHI – Jerome Harrison- 21 Rushes, 99 Yards

Top receivers

- DAL – Jason Witten- 4 Receptions, 46 Yards, 1 Touchdown
- PHI – Chad Hall- 6 Receptions, 84 Yards, 1 Touchdown

Top tacklers

- DAL – Keith Brooking- 7 Tackles
- PHI – Omar Gaither- 10 Tackles

With their playoff position locked and basically all starters resting, the Eagles' sixteenth game was an NFC East rivalry rematch against the Cowboys. In the 2nd quarter the Eagles took the lead as QB Kevin Kolb threw a 4-yard TD pass to WR Chad Hall, but after that the offense had problems after Kolb dropped the ball which was recovered 17 yards for a touchdown by OLB DeMarcus Ware. They took a slight lead with kicker David Akers hitting a 43 and a 22-yard field goal, but failed to maintain this lead when QB Stephen McGee threw a 4-yard TD pass to TE Jason Witten.

With the loss, the Eagles finish on a 10–6 record.

== Postseason results ==
=== NFC Wild Card Playoffs: vs. (6) Green Bay Packers ===
NFC Wild Card Playoffs: (6) Green Bay Packers at (3) Philadelphia Eagles – Game summary

Quarter	1	2	3	4	Total
Packers	7	7	7	0	21
Eagles	0	3	7	6	16

at Lincoln Financial Field, Philadelphia

- Date: January 9
- Game time: 4:30 p.m. EST
- Game weather: 30 °F (−1 °C), Sunny
- Game attendance: 69,144
- Referee: Pete Morelli
- TV announcers (FOX): Joe Buck, Troy Aikman, Pam Oliver and Chris Myers
- Recap, Gamebook

Game information

First quarter

- GB – Tom Crabtree 4-yard pass from Aaron Rodgers (Mason Crosby kick), Packers 7–0, Drive: 10 plays, 68 yards, 5:38.

Second quarter

- GB – James Jones 9-yard pass from Aaron Rodgers (Mason Crosby kick), Packers 14–0, Drive: 12 plays, 57 yards, 7:00.
- PHI – David Akers 29-yard field goal, Packers 14–3, Drive: 8 plays, 63 yards, 4:10.

Third quarter

- PHI – Jason Avant 24-yard pass from Michael Vick (David Akers kick), Packers 14–10, Drive: 2 plays, 24 yards, 0:06.
- GB – Brandon Jackson 16-yard pass from Aaron Rodgers (Mason Crosby kick), Packers 21–10, Drive: 11 plays, 80 yards, 6:17.

Fourth quarter

- PHI – Michael Vick 1-yard run (Vick pass failed), Packers 21–16, Drive: 13 plays, 75 yards, 4:48.

Top passers

- GB – Aaron Rodgers – 18/27, 180 yards, 3 touchdowns
- PHI – Michael Vick – 20/36, 292 yards, 1 touchdown, 1 interception

Top rushers

- GB – James Starks – 23 rushes, 123 yards
- PHI – LeSean McCoy – 12 rushes, 46 yards

Top receivers

- GB – Donald Driver – 5 receptions, 56 yards, 1 touchdown
- PHI – LeSean McCoy – 7 receptions, 93 yards

Top tacklers

- GB – Charles Woodson – 5 tackles
- PHI – Jamar Chaney – 10 tackles, 1 forced fumble

Entering the postseason as the NFC's #3 seed, the Eagles began their playoff run at home in the NFC Wild Card playoffs against the #6 Green Bay Packers, hoping to avenge their Week 1 loss. The Eagles had a terrific early scoring attempt. After a three-and-out, the Eagles drove into field goal range, but All-Pro kicker David Akers missed wide-right on a 41-yard field goal attempt. The Packers instead snatched the early first quarter lead as Packers quarterback Aaron Rodgers completed a 4-yard touchdown pass to tight end Tom Crabtree for the early lead. Green Bay added onto their lead in the second quarter as Rodgers completed a 9-yard touchdown pass to wide receiver James Jones. All the Eagles could muster in the first half was a 29-yard field goal from kicker David Akers.

In the third quarter, after an Aaron Rodgers fumble, quarterback Michael Vick found wide receiver Jason Avant on a 24-yard touchdown pass. The Packers countered right back with an 11-play, 80-yard drive which ended Rodgers chunking a 16-yard touchdown pass to running back Brandon Jackson, taking 6:17 of the clock. At 21–10, the defenses took over for much of the remainder of the game. The Eagles drove into scoring range early in the 4th quarter, but Akers missed another field goal, this time a chip shot from 34 yards, keeping it at 21–10. With 8:56 remaining, the Eagles took over at their own 25. 12 plays and 74 yards later, they faced a fourth-and-goal at the 1. Vick took the snap and rushed forward, barely breaking the plane for a 1-yard touchdown run (with a failed two-point conversion) in the fourth quarter. On the two-point conversion, Vick completed the pass to Celek for the score, but his back heel went out of bounds and back in before he caught the pass, making him an ineligible receiver. The five-yard penalty moved them back to the 7-yard line. Vick's next attempt was incomplete, keeping the score 21–16. The Eagles forced a punt and got the ball back at their own 34 with 1:45 remaining. Vick hit DeSean Jackson for 28 yards to the Packers 38. After back-to-back incompletions, Vick hit Riley Cooper for 11 yards on 3rd and 10, moving the ball to the Packers 27 with less than a minute remaining. However, Green Bay's defense stopped the Eagles' final drive of the game as Tramon Williams intercepted a Vick pass intended for Riley Cooper again, in the end zone, with 44 seconds to go to preserve the win for the Packers. The Eagles outgained the Packers and won the turnover battle 2–1. However, the Packers had longer time of possession. Also, All-Pro kicker David Akers, who was 32/38 on kicks in the regular season, missed two easy field goals. With the loss, Philadelphia was eliminated with an overall record of 10–7.

== 2011 Pro Bowl ==
On December 28, the 2011 Pro Bowl rosters were announced by the NFL. Quarterback Michael Vick, offensive tackle Jason Peters, cornerback Asante Samuel and kicker David Akers were named as starters, while wide receiver DeSean Jackson was named as a reserve.

== See also ==
- 2010 NFL season
