= Omar Gaither =

American football player (born 1984)

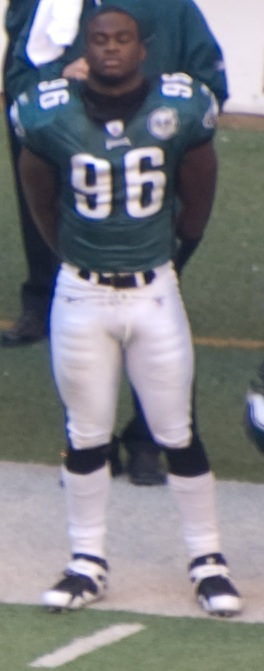
- Gaither with the Philadelphia Eagles in 2007

No. 96, 59, 53, 55, 47
- Position: Linebacker

Personal information
- Born: March 18, 1984 (age 42); Charlotte, North Carolina, U.S.
- Listed height: 6 ft 2 in (1.88 m)
- Listed weight: 235 lb (107 kg)

Career information
- High school: Myers Park (Charlotte)
- College: Tennessee (2002–2005)
- NFL draft: 2006: 5th round, 168th overall pick

Career history
- Philadelphia Eagles (2006–2010); Carolina Panthers (2011); Houston Texans (2012)*; Oakland Raiders (2012); Atlanta Falcons (2013)
- * Offseason or practice squad member only

Awards and highlights
- 2× Second-team All-SEC (2004, 2005)

Career NFL statistics
- Total tackles: 344
- Sacks: 6
- Forced fumbles: 2
- Fumble recoveries: 3
- Interceptions: 2
- Stats at Pro Football Reference

Omar Thabiti Gaither (born March 18, 1984) is an American former professional football player who was a linebacker in the National Football League (NFL). He played college football for the Tennessee Volunteers and was selected by the Philadelphia Eagles in the fifth round of the 2006 NFL draft. He was also a member of the Carolina Panthers, Houston Texans, Oakland Raiders, and Atlanta Falcons.

== Early life ==
Gaither played high school football at Myers Park High School.

== College career ==
Gaither played college football at the University of Tennessee from 2002 until 2005. He was a two-year starter at Tennessee, Gaither recorded 210 tackles with 6 sacks and 23 tackles for a loss. As a senior, finished with 78 tackles, 4 sacks, 7.5 tackles for a loss, and 4 forced fumbles en route to his second straight Second-team All-SEC. Had a career-high 92 tackles, including 12.5 tackles for a loss as a junior when he took over the strongside (or "Sam") linebacker duties.

== Professional career ==
Pre-draft measurables
Height	Weight	Arm length	Hand span	40-yard dash	10-yard split	20-yard split	20-yard shuttle	Three-cone drill	Vertical jump	Broad jump	Bench press
6 ft 1 in (1.85 m)	234 lb (106 kg)	31 3/8 in (0.80 m)	9 1/2 in (0.24 m)	4.73 s	1.66 s	2.79 s	4.28 s	6.97 s	37.0 in (0.94 m)	9 ft 8 in (2.95 m)	23 reps
All values from NFL Combine/Pro Day

=== Philadelphia Eagles ===
Gaither was selected 168th overall in the fifth round of the 2006 NFL draft by the Philadelphia Eagles. Gaither received significant playing time later in the 2006 season due to the struggles and injury of starter Matt McCoy. Gaither got his first NFL start at weakside linebacker on December 4, 2006, on a Monday Night Football win against the Carolina Panthers. He became the starter at weakside linebacker for the final 7 games (post and regular season) and finished with 58 tackles, 1 sack, and 1 interception. Ranked second on the team in special teams tackles (30) and 4th in special teams production points (185).

Gaither was named the starter at middle linebacker in 2007 after the release of Jeremiah Trotter, and started all 16 games at middle linebacker and tallied team highs in tackles (70) and quarterback hurries (14). He also ranked second on the team with 14 KDs, intercepting one pass, defending seven passes, and forcing one fumble.

Prior to the start of 2008, Gaither was moved back to his true position of weakside linebacker to make move room for Stewart Bradley. Though not an indictment of Gaither's performance, Bradley took over the MLB spot largely in part to his phenomenal first start against the New Orleans Saints in week 16 of 2007 (a game in which Gaither played Weakside ("Will") Linebacker). Gaither was benched prior to the week 12 game at the Baltimore Ravens in favor of Akeem Jordan.

After starting middle linebacker Bradley suffered a torn ACL which caused him to be placed on injured reserve in 2009, Gaither beat out second-year linebacker Joe Mays for the starting position. Four weeks into the season, however, the Eagles re-signed Trotter to replace Gaither on first- and second-down plays. Gaither suffered a Lisfranc sprain during a game against the Oakland Raiders and was placed on injured reserve on October 28, 2009.

Gaither was re-signed to a one-year contract on March 31, 2010.

=== Carolina Panthers ===
Gaither was signed by the Carolina Panthers on July 31, 2011, played in all four pre-season games and ten regular season games (started four), and was released on March 13, 2012.

=== Houston Texans ===
The Houston Texans signed Gaither on August 9, 2012, but released him during final cuts.

=== Oakland Raiders ===
The Raiders signed Gaither on November 14, 2012, to replace the injured Travis Goethel.

Gaither re-signed with the Raiders on July 29, 2013, but released him during final cuts.

=== Atlanta Falcons ===
The Atlanta Falcons signed Gaither, along with fellow Eagles teammate Jamar Chaney, on September 17, 2013, to replace the injured Sean Weatherspoon.

== NFL career statistics ==
Legend
**Bold**	Career high

=== Regular season ===
Year	Team	Games		Tackles					Interceptions					Fumbles			
Year	Team	GP	GS	Cmb	Solo	Ast	Sck	TFL	Int	Yds	TD	Lng	PD	FF	FR	Yds	TD
2006	PHI	**16**	5	64	51	13	1.0	1	**1**	16	0	16	3	0	0	0	0
2007	PHI	**16**	**16**	**102**	**70**	**32**	0.0	4	**1**	**49**	0	**49**	**9**	**1**	0	0	0
2008	PHI	**16**	10	59	51	8	**2.5**	**10**	0	0	0	0	6	**1**	**2**	**6**	0
2009	PHI	5	3	30	24	6	1.5	4	0	0	0	0	1	0	1	0	0
2010	PHI	14	2	36	32	4	0.0	2	0	0	0	0	0	0	0	0	0
2011	CAR	10	4	31	24	7	1.0	1	0	0	0	0	1	0	0	0	0
2012	OAK	7	4	14	9	5	0.0	2	0	0	0	0	0	0	0	0	0
2013	ATL	8	1	8	3	5	0.0	0	0	0	0	0	0	0	0	0	0
Career		92	45	344	264	80	6.0	24	2	65	0	49	20	2	3	6	0

=== Playoffs ===
Year	Team	Games		Tackles					Interceptions					Fumbles			
Year	Team	GP	GS	Cmb	Solo	Ast	Sck	TFL	Int	Yds	TD	Lng	PD	FF	FR	Yds	TD
2006	PHI	2	**2**	**13**	**11**	**2**	0.0	**1**	0	0	0	0	**1**	0	0	0	0
2008	PHI	**3**	0	4	3	1	0.0	0	0	0	0	0	0	0	0	0	0
2010	PHI	1	0	1	1	0	0.0	0	0	0	0	0	0	0	**1**	0	0
Career		6	2	18	15	3	0.0	1	0	0	0	0	1	0	1	0	0
