= Darryl Tapp =

American football player and coach (born 1984)

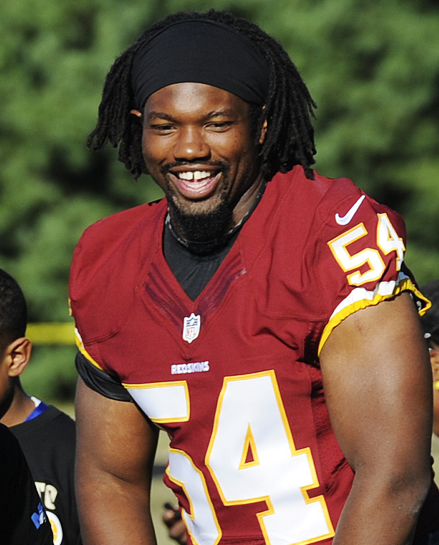
- Tapp with the Washington Redskins in 2013

Washington Commanders
- Title: Assistant defensive line coach

Personal information
- Born: September 13, 1984 (age 42); Portsmouth, Virginia, U.S.
- Listed height: 6 ft 1 in (1.85 m)
- Listed weight: 270 lb (122 kg)

Career information
- Position: Defensive end (No. 55, 91, 54, 52, 56)
- High school: Deep Creek (Chesapeake, Virginia)
- College: Virginia Tech (2002–2005)
- NFL draft: 2006: 2nd round, 63rd overall pick

Career history

Playing
- Seattle Seahawks (2006–2009); Philadelphia Eagles (2010–2012); Washington Redskins (2013); Detroit Lions (2014–2015); New Orleans Saints (2016–2017); Tampa Bay Buccaneers (2017)

Coaching
- Central Michigan Chippewas (2018) Defensive quality control coach; Vanderbilt Commodores (2019) Special teams quality control coach; Virginia Tech Hokies (2020) Co-defensive line coach; San Francisco 49ers (2021–2023) Assistant defensive line coach; Washington Commanders (2024–present); Defensive line coach (2024–2025); Assistant defensive line coach (2026–present)

Awards and highlights
- Virginia Tech Sports Hall of Fame (2018); Dudley Award (2005); First-team All-American (2005); 2× first-team All-ACC (2004, 2005)

Career NFL statistics
- Tackles: 332
- Sacks: 29
- Forced fumbles: 12
- Fumble recoveries: 10
- Interceptions: 2
- Touchdowns: 1
- Stats at Pro Football Reference

Darryl Anthony Tapp (born September 13, 1984) is an American professional football coach and former defensive end who is the assistant defensive line coach for the Washington Commanders of the National Football League (NFL). He played college football for the Virginia Tech Hokies and was selected by the Seattle Seahawks in the second round of the 2006 NFL draft. Tapp also played for the Philadelphia Eagles, Washington Redskins, Detroit Lions, New Orleans Saints, and Tampa Bay Buccaneers before entering coaching in 2018.

== Early life ==
Tapp attended Deep Creek High School in Chesapeake, Virginia where he lettered in football, basketball, and track and field. His senior year, Tapp set a school record with 15 sacks and made 89 tackles and was named Second-team All-State. In all, he recorded 22 career sacks while helping Deep Creek to a 34–4 record during his three varsity seasons. He was one of just three juniors to start on offense and defense for Deep Creek in 2000 when he played in all 14 games and posted eight quarterback sacks and earned First-team All-District.

== College career ==
Tapp played as a freshman in 2002 at Virginia Tech, mostly on special teams. Against Virginia, he returned a punt blocked by Justin Hamilton for a touchdown and for Tapp's first collegiate score. On the season, he recorded nine solo tackles and 12 assists, three quarterback hurries and a pass broken up. Tapp set a position record for defensive ends with a 660-pound back squat during the spring. He also had a 415-pound bench press and a 340-pound push jerk, a 530-pound back squat, a 32 1/2 in (830 mm) vertical jump and a 4.71 s time in the forty-yard dash. In 2003, he compiled 58 total tackles—nine tackles for loss, including three sacks and 17 quarterback hurries and a forced fumble. In 2004, Tapp won the starting job, taking over for Nathaniel Adibi as the boundary defensive end and started all 13 games, registered 60 tackles were 16.5 tackles for loss and 8.5 sacks and had 23 quarterback hurries, two fumble recoveries, a forced fumble, a pass break up, an interception and a blocked kick as was named First-team All-Atlantic Coast Conference. During his senior year in 2005, he started all thirteen games make 48 tackles (14.5 for losses) and 10 sacks and as first-team All-ACC again. He was inducted into the Virginia Tech Sports Hall of Fame in 2018.

== Professional career ==
Pre-draft measurables
Height	Weight	Arm length	Hand span	40-yard dash	10-yard split	20-yard split	20-yard shuttle	Three-cone drill	Vertical jump	Broad jump	Bench press
6 ft 1 5/8 in (1.87 m)	252 lb (114 kg)	33 1/4 in (0.84 m)	10 1/4 in (0.26 m)	4.80 s	1.67 s	2.82 s	4.48 s	7.31 s	33 in (0.84 m)	9 ft 1 in (2.77 m)	27 reps
All values from NFL Combine/Pro Day

=== Seattle Seahawks ===
Tapp was selected by the Seattle Seahawks in the second round (63rd overall) of the 2006 NFL draft. As a rookie, Tapp was a special teamer and part of the Seahawks' defensive end rotation. He recorded 33 tackles, three sacks, one forced fumble, one interception, and one defensive touchdown. In 2007, he saw a lot more playing time, as the Seahawks' former starting left end Grant Wistrom was cut from the team, and the right end Bryce Fisher was traded to the Titans. As a result, he started all 16 games for the Seahawks with new arrival Patrick Kerney as the other defensive end. In 2007, Tapp made 49 tackles, seven sacks, and one interception.

On October 21, 2007, Tapp had four sacks and forced a fumble against the St. Louis Rams, a personal best. Two weeks after, Tapp had an interception against Cleveland Browns' quarterback Derek Anderson.

On December 25, 2009, Green Bay Packers' quarterback Aaron Rodgers accused Tapp of biting him on his left arm in their matchup in the 2008 season.

=== Philadelphia Eagles ===
On March 16, 2010, the Seahawks traded Tapp to the Philadelphia Eagles in exchange for Chris Clemons and a fourth-round draft pick in 2010. Tapp was signed by the Eagles to a three-year contract after passing his physical on March 18. On September 26, 2010, Tapp recorded his first sack as an Eagle, bringing down Jacksonville Jaguars' quarterback David Garrard. On January 9, 2011, Tapp recorded his first-career postseason sack, bringing down Green Bay Packers' quarterback Aaron Rodgers.

=== Washington Redskins ===
On March 28, 2013, Tapp signed a one-year deal with the Washington Redskins. On September 29, 2013, Tapp recorded his first sack as a member of the Redskins, tackling Oakland Raiders' quarterback Matt Flynn.

=== Detroit Lions ===
On March 13, 2014, Tapp signed a one-year contract with the Detroit Lions. Tapp was released on August 30, 2014, from the Lions. On March 2, 2015, the Lions re-signed Tapp to a one-year contract. In 2015, Tapp earned the Detroit Lions-Detroit Sports Broadcasters Association-Pro Football Writers Association (Detroit Chapter) Media-Friendly Good Guy Award.

=== New Orleans Saints ===
On July 6, 2016, Tapp was signed to the New Orleans Saints. On September 3, 2016, he was released by the Saints but re-signed on September 5, 2016. He re-signed with the Saints on March 23, 2017. He was released on September 5, 2017, re-signed later that month before being released again.

=== Tampa Bay Buccaneers ===
On October 25, 2017, Tapp signed with the Tampa Bay Buccaneers. He was released by the Buccaneers on November 28, 2017.

== NFL career statistics ==
Legend
**Bold**	Career high

=== Regular season ===
Year	Team	Games		Tackles					Interceptions					Fumbles			
Year	Team	GP	GS	Cmb	Solo	Ast	Sck	TFL	Int	Yds	TD	Lng	PD	FF	FR	Yds	TD
2006	SEA	16	0	36	25	**11**	3	6	**1**	**25**	**1**	**25**	1	1	0	0	0
2007	SEA	16	16	49	41	8	**7**	7	**1**	-4	0	-4	**8**	3	2	**9**	0
2008	SEA	16	11	**55**	**46**	9	5.5	7	0	0	0	0	0	**4**	1	0	0
2009	SEA	16	5	49	40	9	2.5	**9**	0	0	0	0	3	0	1	0	0
2010	PHI	14	1	27	26	1	3	8	0	0	0	0	4	0	**3**	0	0
2011	PHI	12	2	27	19	8	2.5	7	0	0	0	0	2	1	0	0	0
2012	PHI	13	0	17	13	4	0.5	1	0	0	0	0	0	0	1	4	0
2013	WAS	11	0	10	7	3	1.0	2	0	0	0	0	0	0	0	0	0
2014	DET	16	0	17	12	5	0.5	0	0	0	0	0	2	1	1	0	0
2015	DET	16	1	26	19	7	2.0	5	0	0	0	0	0	2	0	0	0
2016	NO	16	2	17	12	5	0.5	0	0	0	0	0	0	0	1	0	0
2017	TAM	3	1	2	2	0	1	1	0	0	0	0	0	0	0	0	0
		165	39	332	262	70	29	53	2	21	1	25	20	12	10	13	0

=== Postseason ===
Year	Team	Games		Tackles					Interceptions					Fumbles			
Year	Team	GP	GS	Cmb	Solo	Ast	Sck	TFL	Int	Yds	TD	Lng	PD	FF	FR	Yds	TD
2006	SEA	2	0	4	4	0	0.0	**1**	0	0	0	0	0	0	0	0	0
2007	SEA	2	2	**8**	**6**	**2**	0.0	0	0	0	0	0	0	0	0	0	0
2010	PHI	1	0	1	1	0	**1.0**	0	0	0	0	0	0	**1**	0	0	0
2014	DET	1	0	2	2	0	**1.0**	0	0	0	0	0	0	**1**	0	0	0
		6	2	15	13	2	2.0	1	0	0	0	0	0	2	0	0	0

== Coaching career ==
On December 13, 2019, Tapp returned to Virginia Tech as a co-defensive line coach. He joined the San Francisco 49ers as an assistant defensive line coach on February 11, 2021. Tapp was hired as the defensive line coach of the Washington Commanders on February 15, 2024. Following the hiring of Daronte Jones as the team's defensive coordinator and Jones' choice to hire Eric Henderson as the new defensive line coach, Tapp was demoted to assistant defensive line coach in February 2026.

== Personal life ==
Tapp has been long-time friends with former NFL defensive back DeAngelo Hall since childhood, the two having gone to the same school from elementary school throughout college and being teammates.
