= Joe Mays (American football) =

American football player (born 1985)

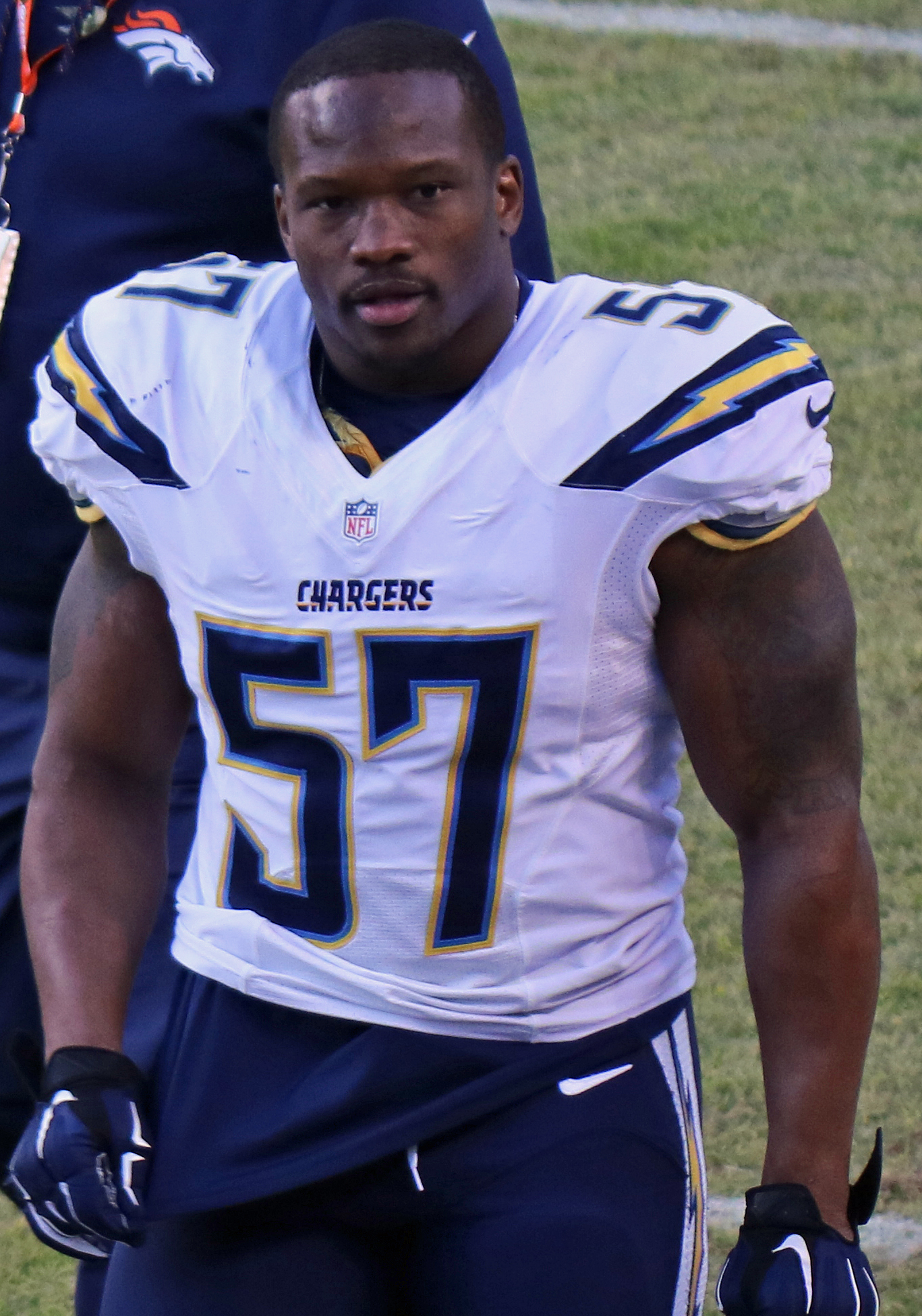
- Mays with the San Diego Chargers in 2015

No. 51, 53, 57
- Position: Linebacker

Personal information
- Born: July 6, 1985 (age 41); Chicago, Illinois, U.S.
- Listed height: 5 ft 11 in (1.80 m)
- Listed weight: 245 lb (111 kg)

Career information
- High school: Hyde Park (Chicago)
- College: North Dakota State
- NFL draft: 2008: 6th round, 200th overall pick

Career history
- Philadelphia Eagles (2008−2009); Denver Broncos (2010−2012); Houston Texans (2013); Kansas City Chiefs (2014); New York Jets (2015)*; San Diego Chargers (2015)
- * Offseason or practice squad member only

Awards and highlights
- Division I-AA All-American (2007); 3× First-team All-GWC (2005–2007); GWC Defensive P.O.Y. (2007)

Career NFL statistics
- Total tackles: 246
- Sacks: 1.5
- Forced fumbles: 1
- Fumble recoveries: 1
- Stats at Pro Football Reference

Joseph Lamont Mays (born July 6, 1985) is an American former professional football player who was a linebacker in the National Football League (NFL). He played college football for the North Dakota State Bison and was selected by the Philadelphia Eagles of the National Football League (NFL) in the sixth round of the 2008 NFL draft. Mays also played for the Denver Broncos, Houston Texans, Kansas City Chiefs and San Diego Chargers.

== Early life ==
Mays attended Hyde Park High School in Chicago, Illinois. He did not play football until his junior year of high school. He earned first-team all-conference honors in both his junior and senior years. He was named a first-team all-city selection as a senior in football after he made 115 tackles, 16 sacks, and two interceptions.

== College career ==
As a senior at North Dakota State, Mays led the team on defense with 90 tackles, nine tackles-for-loss and 2.5 sacks. He earned All-American honors and was named the Great West Conference Defensive Player of the Year.

Mays was a three-time first-team All-Great West Conference selection in his career. He made 285 total tackles, a school-record 159 solo tackles, 29.5 tackles-for-loss, three interceptions, and eleven sacks in his 31 games started and 43 games played in his career.

== Professional career ==
=== Philadelphia Eagles ===
Mays was selected by the Philadelphia Eagles in the sixth round with the 200th overall pick of the 2008 NFL draft. He spent most of the 2008 season inactive, but played in the last two games of the season on special teams.

On August 2, 2009, the starting linebacker for the Eagles, Stewart Bradley, suffered a season-ending torn ACL during training camp. At subsequent Eagles practices, Mays was promoted to Bradley's position, middle linebacker, although Omar Gaither beat him out for the job.

=== Denver Broncos ===
Mays (51) looks on as teammates tackle Steven Jackson on November 28, 2010.

Mays was traded to the Denver Broncos in exchange for running back J. J. Arrington on July 30, 2010.

On September 25, 2012, Mays was suspended for one game and fined $50,000 by the NFL for his hit on the Houston Texans quarterback Matt Schaub that lacerated Schaub's earlobe. During the Week 8 game against the New Orleans Saints, Mays fractured his fibula and was placed on injured reserve.

On July 23, 2013, Mays was released by the Broncos.

=== Houston Texans ===
On July 29, 2013, Mays signed with the Houston Texans to a one-year contract.

=== Kansas City Chiefs ===
Mays signed with the Kansas City Chiefs on March 12, 2014. Due to an injury suffered in the Chiefs final preseason game, Mays was placed on injured reserve with a designated for return tag, and was activated on November 8, 2014. He was released by the team on March 5, 2015.

=== New York Jets ===
Mays was signed by the New York Jets on April 13, 2015.

=== San Diego Chargers ===
Mays signed a 1-year contract with the San Diego Chargers on October 20, 2015.

== NFL career statistics ==
Legend
**Bold**	Career high

=== Regular season ===
Year	Team	Games		Tackles					Interceptions					Fumbles			
Year	Team	GP	GS	Cmb	Solo	Ast	Sck	TFL	Int	Yds	TD	Lng	PD	FF	FR	Yds	TD
2008	PHI	2	0	0	0	0	0.0	0	0	0	0	0	0	0	0	0	0
2009	PHI	11	1	18	17	1	0.0	1	0	0	0	0	0	**1**	0	0	0
2010	DEN	12	5	40	35	5	0.0	3	0	0	0	0	1	0	0	0	0
2011	DEN	**16**	12	**75**	**64**	11	0.0	**8**	0	0	0	0	2	0	0	0	0
2012	DEN	6	4	20	7	13	0.5	0	0	0	0	0	0	0	0	0	0
2013	HOU	14	**13**	67	42	**25**	**1.0**	6	0	0	0	0	**3**	0	0	0	0
2014	KAN	8	3	20	16	4	0.0	1	0	0	0	0	0	0	**1**	0	0
2015	SDG	9	0	6	3	3	0.0	0	0	0	0	0	0	0	0	0	0
Total		78	38	246	184	62	1.5	19	0	0	0	0	6	1	1	0	0

=== Playoffs ===
Year	Team	Games		Tackles					Interceptions					Fumbles			
Year	Team	GP	GS	Cmb	Solo	Ast	Sck	TFL	Int	Yds	TD	Lng	PD	FF	FR	Yds	TD
2009	PHI	1	0	2	2	0	0.0	0	0	0	0	0	0	0	0	0	0
2011	DEN	**2**	**2**	**15**	**9**	**6**	0.0	0	0	0	0	0	**1**	0	0	0	0
Total		3	2	17	11	6	0.0	0	0	0	0	0	1	0	0	0	0

== Personal life ==
Mays earned a degree in physical education from North Dakota State. He and his wife, LaToyia, have one son, Jai, and one daughter, Joi.
