= Jamar Chaney =

American football player and coach (born 1986)

Baylor Bears
- Title: Inside linebackers coach

Personal information
- Born: October 11, 1986 (age 40); Fort Pierce, Florida, U.S.
- Listed height: 6 ft 0 in (1.83 m)
- Listed weight: 242 lb (110 kg)

Career information
- High school: St. Lucie West Centennial (Port St. Lucie, Florida)
- College: Mississippi State
- NFL draft: 2010: 7th round, 220th overall pick

Career history

Playing
- Philadelphia Eagles (2010–2012); Atlanta Falcons (2013); Denver Broncos (2014)*; Oakland Raiders (2014)
- * Offseason or practice squad member only

Coaching
- St. Lucie West Centennial HS (2016–2018) Head coach; Florida (2019) Assistant director of player personnel; Mississippi State (2020) Senior defensive analyst; Florida (2021–2022) Defensive analyst; Western Kentucky (2023) Outside linebackers coach; Baylor (2024–present) Inside linebackers coach

Awards and highlights
- Second-team All-SEC (2007)

Career NFL statistics
- Total tackles: 163
- Sacks: 1
- Forced fumbles: 1
- Interceptions: 3
- Stats at Pro Football Reference

Jamar Antwon Chaney (born October 11, 1986) is an American former professional football linebacker who is currently a part of the Baylor Bears coaching staff. He was selected by the Philadelphia Eagles in the seventh round of the 2010 NFL draft. He played college football at Mississippi State.

== Early life ==
Chaney attended St. Lucie West Centennial High School, in Port St. Lucie, Florida, where he starred as a linebacker and defensive end on defense and tight end on offense. His senior season was cut short to just six games by Hurricane Frances and Hurricane Jeanne, which both made direct hits near Port St. Lucie in September 2004. Chaney still managed to compile 65 tackles and 10 quarterback sacks and added eight pass receptions for 150 yards and three touchdowns at tight end. In his junior year, he tallied 120 tackles with six sacks, a school-record 22 tackles for loss and five caused fumbles. He set West Centennial's career record with 31 quarterback sacks.

Considered a three-star recruit by Rivals.com, Chaney was listed as the No. 29 outside linebacker prospect in the nation. He originally committed to the University of Georgia, but was denied admission because he had someone else take his SAT. He was released from his scholarship and chose Mississippi State over Florida, and among others.

== College career ==
As a true freshman at Mississippi State, Chaney played in all 11 games, earned three starting calls at weakside linebacker, and totalled 31 tackles on the season. By his sophomore year, he ranked at the top of the depth chart at WLB and played in all 12 games. He finished the 2006 season with 66 total tackles, including seven and one-half for loss (minus 27 yards), two and one-half of which were quarterback sacks (minus 17 yards).

For his junior campaign, Chaney was switched to the middle linebacker position, where he played all 13 games for the Bulldogs. He led the team with 89 total tackles, including three and one-half for loss (minus 5 yards). Chaney tied for 15th in the SEC in tackles per game (6.8) and earned Second-team All-SEC honors by the league's coaches. In Mississippi State's 2008 season opener Chaney registered a team-best 12 tackles, his third career double-digit tackle performance, but suffered a leg injury on the next-to-last snap of the game. X-rays later confirmed a broken fibula and torn ligaments in his ankle, and he later received a medical redshirt for the season to regain his final season of eligibility.

Rivals.com listed Chaney as the most underrated player in the Southeastern Conference in 2009.

Chaney was invited to participate in the 2010 Senior Bowl on January 30, 2010. In the game, he made eight tackles and recovered a fumble, and was named the Defensive Player of the Game for the South team.

== Professional career ==
=== Pre-draft ===
Chaney worked out in Miami, Florida, with trainer Pete Bommarito to improve his speed in the 40-yard dash; at the NFL Combine, he ran the distance in 4.54 seconds, the fastest among all linebackers. According to NFL draft analyst Chris Steuber, Chaney's experience playing outside earlier in his career could help him play on the strong side or as a 3-4 middle linebacker in the NFL.

Pre-draft measurables
Height	Weight	Arm length	Hand span	40-yard dash	20-yard shuttle	Three-cone drill	Vertical jump	Bench press
6 ft 0 3/4 in (1.85 m)	242 lb (110 kg)	33 1/2 in (0.85 m)	9 7/8 in (0.25 m)	4.54 s	4.29 s	6.90 s	39 in (0.99 m)	26 reps
All values from the NFL Combine

=== Philadelphia Eagles ===
Chaney was selected by the Philadelphia Eagles in the seventh round (220th overall) of the 2010 NFL draft. He was signed to a four-year contract on June 4, 2010. After starting middle linebacker Stewart Bradley suffered a dislocated elbow in the second quarter of a week 14 game against the Dallas Cowboys on December 12, Chaney filled in for him and led the team with seven tackles. Chaney made his first NFL start against the New York Giants, and he recorded 16 tackles, 12 of them being solo tackles. After his start, NFL analyst Brian Baldinger said Chaney was, "already one of the best middle linebackers in the league", and that he's "phenomenal in all phases of the game". On August 25, 2013, Chaney was released by the Eagles.

=== Atlanta Falcons ===
He was signed on the Atlanta Falcons' roster on September 17, 2013, along with former Eagles teammate Omar Gaither. He was then released on October 22, 2013.

=== Denver Broncos ===
Chaney, along with seven other players, were signed to future contracts with the Denver Broncos on January 22, 2014. The Broncos released Chaney on August 24, 2014.

=== Oakland Raiders ===
Chaney was signed by the Oakland Raiders on October 8, 2014, after Nick Roach was put on injured reserve.

== Coaching career ==
After retiring from the NFL, Chaney became the head coach of his alma mater, St. Lucie West Centennial High School, where he went 11-8-1 and coached the team to its first playoff appearance in seven years. Chaney left St. Lucie West in 2019 to become the Assistant Director of Player Personnel for High School Relations for the Florida Gators football team. Chaney left the University of Florida in July 2020 and accepted a senior defensive analyst position at his alma mater, Mississippi State University. Chaney returned to the University of Florida in December 2021 under head coach Billy Napier as a Defensive Analyst for Inside and Outside Linebackers.

On February 28, 2024, it was announced that Chaney had accepted a role as the inside linebackers coach at Baylor.
