= Zipp Duncan =

American gridiron football player (born 1987)

No. 72
- Position: Guard

Personal information
- Born: July 15, 1987 (age 39); Magnolia, Kentucky
- Listed height: 6 ft 5 in (1.96 m)
- Listed weight: 297 lb (135 kg)

Career information
- College: Kentucky
- NFL draft: 2010: undrafted

Career history
- Philadelphia Eagles (2010)*; Edmonton Eskimos (2011)*; Dallas Vigilantes (2011); Philadelphia Soul (2012)
- * Offseason or practice squad member only

Awards and highlights
- Second-team All-SEC (2009)
- Stats at ArenaFan.com

Zipp McCoy Duncan (born July 15, 1987) is an American former football guard. He was signed by the Philadelphia Eagles as an undrafted free agent in 2010. He played college football at Kentucky.

Duncan was also a member of the Edmonton Eskimos, Dallas Vigilantes and Philadelphia Soul.

== Early life ==
Duncan was born and raised in Magnolia, Kentucky. He is the son of Steve and Fonda Duncan. Duncan has three younger siblings Drey, Christian, and Christina Duncan. Zipp attended Elizabethtown High School in Elizabethtown, Kentucky and graduated in 2005, along with football teammates Brandon Deaderick and Chris Todd.

Duncan played under his father Steve Duncan who was an assistant coach. Duncans father also coached at Ft. Knox, Lone Oak high school and Murray High School.

== College career ==
Duncan played college football at the University of Kentucky. He played in 12 games as a tight end before switching over to the offensive line in 2007. As a senior in 2009, Duncan earned second-team All-SEC honors as a left tackle.

== Professional career ==
=== Philadelphia Eagles ===
Duncan was signed by the Philadelphia Eagles as an undrafted free agent following the 2010 NFL draft on April 26, 2010. He was waived on August 28.

== Present day ==
He is a football coach at Westerville South highschool in Westerville Ohio.
