= Pannel Egboh =

American football player (born 1986)

No. 79
- Position: Defensive end

Personal information
- Born: March 23, 1986 (age 40); Garland, Texas, U.S.
- Listed height: 6 ft 6 in (1.98 m)
- Listed weight: 287 lb (130 kg)

Career information
- College: Stanford
- NFL draft: 2009: undrafted

Career history
- San Francisco 49ers (2009)*; Houston Texans (2009–2010)*; Philadelphia Eagles (2010)*; Tennessee Titans (2011–2012); Jacksonville Jaguars (2013)*
- * Offseason or practice squad member only

Career NFL statistics
- Total tackles: 2
- Stats at Pro Football Reference

Pannel Egboh (born March 23, 1986) is an American former professional football player who was a defensive end in the National Football League (NFL). He was signed by the San Francisco 49ers as an undrafted free agent in 2009. He played college football for the Stanford Cardinal, under current University of Michigan head coach Jim Harbaugh. He currently attends McGovern Medical School.

== College career ==
Egboh played college football at Stanford University. He finished college with 141 tackles, 10 sacks, 3 pass deflections and 3 forced fumbles.

In his Freshman year, he finished the season with 15 tackles, a sack and 2 pass deflections. On September 10, 2005, he had 6 tackles along with a sack against Navy in which Stanford won 41-38.

In his Sophomore year, he finished the season with 45 tackles, 1.5 sacks and a pass deflection. On October 21, 2006, he recorded 3 tackles along with a sack against Arizona State.

In his Junior year, he finished the season with 49 tackles, 6 sacks and 3 forced fumbles. Also as a junior (2007), Egboh led all Cardinal defensive linemen for the second straight season with a career-high 49 tackles, which was the fifth highest total on the team. Finished with 13.5 tackles for losses of 75 yards, which ranked third on the team. Tied for second on the team with six sacks. Earned Pac-10 Defensive Player of the Week honors after recording a career-best 10 tackles, a career-high-tying 2.5 tackles for loss, 1.5 sacks and his first blocked kick on an extra point attempt in Stanford’s upset victory over #1-ranked USC. On November 24, 2007, he had 4 tackles, 2 sacks and a forced fumble against Notre Dame.

In his Senior year, he finished the season with 32 tackles, 1.5 sacks.

== Professional career ==
=== San Francisco 49ers ===
On April 26, 2009, he signed with the San Francisco 49ers as an undrafted free agent. He was released on September 5, 2009.

=== Houston Texans ===
On January 4, 2010, he signed with the Houston Texans to a reserve/future contract. He was released on August 29, 2010.

=== Philadelphia Eagles ===
On August 31, 2010, he was claimed off waivers by the Philadelphia Eagles. On September 3, 2010, he was released a couple of days later. On October 13, 2010, he was signed to the practice squad.

=== Tennessee Titans ===
On January 4, 2011, he signed with the Tennessee Titans to a reserve/future contract. On September 3, 2011, he was released. On September 5, 2011, he was signed to the practice squad. On January 2, 2012, he was signed to a reserve/future contract. On September 11, 2012, he was released along with Offensive tackle Troy Kropog after the team signed Deuce Lutui and reinstated Kenny Britt after serving his suspension. On September 26, 2012, he re-signed with the team after Keyunta Dawson was placed on Injured Reserve due to a Hamstring injury.

=== Jacksonville Jaguars ===
On April 18, 2013, Egboh signed with the Jacksonville Jaguars following a minicamp tryout. He was released on August 30, 2013.
