= Jared Perry =

American football player (born 1988)

No. 85
- Position: Wide receiver

Personal information
- Born: August 27, 1988 (age 38); La Marque, Texas, U.S.
- Listed height: 6 ft 1 in (1.85 m)
- Listed weight: 180 lb (82 kg)

Career information
- High school: La Marque
- College: Missouri
- NFL draft: 2010: undrafted

Career history
- San Francisco 49ers (2010)*; Philadelphia Eagles (2010)*; Chicago Rush (2012); Arizona Rattlers (2013–2014); Iowa Barnstormers (2014)*; Arizona Rattlers (2014); Iowa Barnstormers (2014)*; Arizona Rattlers (2014–2015); Portland Thunder/Steel (2015–2016)
- * Offseason or practice squad member only

Awards and highlights
- 2× ArenaBowl champion (2013, 2014); AFL Rookie of the Year (2012)

Career AFL statistics
- Receptions: 373
- Receiving yards: 5,039
- Receiving touchdowns: 95
- Rushing yards: 64
- Rushing touchdowns: 3
- Stats at ArenaFan.com

Jared Perry (born August 27, 1988) is an American former professional football wide receiver. He was signed by the San Francisco 49ers as an undrafted free agent in 2010. He played college football at Missouri.

Perry was also a member of the Philadelphia Eagles. He was the AFL Rookie of the Year in 2012. Perry joined the Arizona Rattlers in 2013, helping the Rattlers to their second straight ArenaBowl title.

On April 15, 2014, Perry was placed on reassignment by the Rattlers, and was claimed the next day by the Iowa Barnstormers. After refusing to report to the Barnstormers, Perry was traded back to Arizona for Louis Nzegwu. On May 6, 2014, Perry was traded to Iowa for Nzegwu. On May 12, 2014, Perry was traded back to the Rattlers for Future Considerations.

On April 10, 2015, Perry was placed on reassignment by the Rattlers. On April 11, 2015, he was claimed by the Portland Thunder.
