= Greg Isdaner =

American football player (born 1987)

No. 61, 77
- Position: Guard

Personal information
- Born: February 25, 1987 (age 39); Gladwyne, Pennsylvania, U.S.
- Listed height: 6 ft 4 in (1.93 m)
- Listed weight: 322 lb (146 kg)

Career information
- College: West Virginia
- NFL draft: 2009: undrafted

Career history
- Dallas Cowboys (2009)*; Philadelphia Eagles (2009–2010)*; Hartford Colonials (2010)
- * Offseason or practice squad member only

Greg Isdaner (born February 25, 1987) is an American former football guard. He was signed by the Dallas Cowboys as an undrafted free agent in 2009. He played college football at West Virginia.

Isdaner was also a member of the Philadelphia Eagles and Hartford Colonials.

== Professional career ==
=== Dallas Cowboys ===
Isdaner announced he would forgo his senior season and enter the 2009 NFL draft. Isdaner worked out at the 2009 NFL Combine, however he went undrafted in the NFL draft.

=== Philadelphia Eagles ===
Isdaner was signed to the Philadelphia Eagles' practice squad on November 25. He was released on December 8. He was re-signed to the practice squad on December 28. His practice squad contract expired at the conclusion of the 2009 season. He was re-signed to a three-year contract by the Eagles on May 4, 2010. He was waived on August 28.

=== Current life ===
Isdaner was signed by the Hartford Colonials on September 3, 2010. He was released on July 15, 2011. Isdaner currently coaches at Germantown Academy in PA.
