= Jeff Owens =

American football player (born 1986)

No. 64
- Position: Defensive tackle

Personal information
- Born: October 14, 1986 (age 40); Sunrise, Florida, U.S.
- Listed height: 6 ft 1 in (1.85 m)
- Listed weight: 304 lb (138 kg)

Career information
- High school: Plantation (Plantation, Florida)
- College: Georgia
- NFL draft: 2010: 7th round, 243rd overall pick

Career history
- Philadelphia Eagles (2010)

Awards and highlights
- First-team All-SEC (2005)

Career NFL statistics
- Games played: 1
- Stats at Pro Football Reference

Jeff Owens (born October 14, 1986) is an American former professional football player who was a defensive tackle in the National Football League (NFL). He was selected by the Philadelphia Eagles in the seventh round of the 2010 NFL draft. He played college football for the Georgia Bulldogs.

== Early life ==
Owens played high school football at Plantation High School in Plantation, Florida.

== Professional career ==
Pre-draft measurables
Height	Weight	Arm length	Hand span	40-yard dash	10-yard split	20-yard split	20-yard shuttle	Vertical jump	Broad jump	Bench press
6 ft 1 in (1.85 m)	304 lb (138 kg)	32 3/4 in (0.83 m)	8 7/8 in (0.23 m)	4.95 s	1.72 s	2.81 s	4.68 s	30.0 in (0.76 m)	9 ft 2 in (2.79 m)	44 reps

Owens was selected by the Philadelphia Eagles in the seventh round (243rd overall) of the 2010 NFL draft. He was signed to a four-year contract on June 4, 2010. He was waived on September 4, but re-signed to the team's practice squad on September 5. He was promoted to the active roster on December 21. He was placed on injured reserve on December 29 after suffering a left patellar tendon rupture in a week 16 game against the Minnesota Vikings. He was waived on July 28, 2011, after failing his physical.

=== Coaching career ===
As of the 2011 football season, Owens is coaching the defensive line at West Forsyth High School in Cumming, Georgia. The 2011 Wolverines advanced to the third round of the GHSA playoffs, their best year to date.

Following a brief stint at the NAIA Kentucky Christian University (2020–2022, Owens leads the defensive line at the Mid South Conference NAIA Campbellsville University (2023–present).

== Personal life ==
He is a member of Zeta Nu chapter of Phi Beta Sigma fraternity.
