= Stewart Bradley (American football) =

American football player (born 1983)

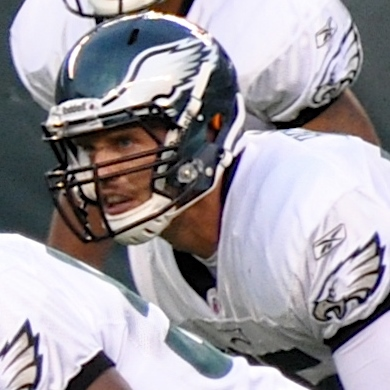
- Bradley with the Philadelphia Eagles in 2009

No. 55, 97, 52
- Position: Linebacker

Personal information
- Born: November 2, 1983 (age 43); Salt Lake City, Utah, U.S.
- Listed height: 6 ft 4 in (1.93 m)
- Listed weight: 258 lb (117 kg)

Career information
- High school: Highland (Salt Lake City)
- College: Nebraska
- NFL draft: 2007: 3rd round, 87th overall pick

Career history
- Philadelphia Eagles (2007–2010); Arizona Cardinals (2011–2012); Denver Broncos (2013)

Awards and highlights
- Sports Illustrated All-Pro team (2008)

Career NFL statistics
- Total tackles: 239
- Sacks: 3.0
- Forced fumbles: 1
- Fumble recoveries: 1
- Interceptions: 3
- Stats at Pro Football Reference

Stewart Harris Bradley (born November 2, 1983) is an American former professional football player who was a linebacker in the National Football League (NFL). He was selected by the Philadelphia Eagles in the third round of the 2007 NFL draft and also played for the Arizona Cardinals. He played college football for the Nebraska Cornhuskers.

== Early life ==
Bradley played just one season of football as a junior at Highland High School in Salt Lake City, Utah, due to injuries, starting at safety. He also starred in rugby and won 3 straight national championships with the Highland Club in Salt Lake City.

== College career ==
Bradley was a three-year starter at the University of Nebraska as a strong-side linebacker and in 43 games, registered 175 tackles, 25 TFLs, 4 sacks, 3 FFs, 4 FRs, and 1 INT, which he returned 43-yds for a touchdown. He enrolled at Nebraska in 2002, spending the season as a defensive end on the scout team. In 2003, he appeared in all thirteen games as a reserve left defensive end, moving to that position after playing at middle linebacker in preseason camp. He managed only six tackles (4 solos) with three stops for losses and four pressures as an edge rusher. He also earned Academic All-Big Twelve Conference honors. He made the move to strong-side linebacker in 2004 and finished 2nd on the team with 67 tackles after serving as a reserve defensive end the previous two seasons. He missed most of the 2005 campaign with torn ACL in left knee but finished with 26 tackles (11 solos), three sacks and five stops for losses and added seven quarterback pressures and returned an interception 43 yards for a touchdown. Bradley led the Cornhuskers in tackles with 76 (6 for losses) in 2006 and also added 1 sack, 3 FF, and 4 FR.

== Professional career ==
Pre-draft measurables
Height	Weight	Arm length	Hand span	40-yard dash	10-yard split	20-yard split	20-yard shuttle	Three-cone drill	Vertical jump	Broad jump	Bench press
6 ft 3 3/4 in (1.92 m)	256 lb (116 kg)	34 3/8 in (0.87 m)	10 in (0.25 m)	4.71 s	1.60 s	2.72 s	4.17 s	7.29 s	35.5 in (0.90 m)	9 ft 4 in (2.84 m)	28 reps
All values from NFL Combine/Nebraska's Pro Day

=== Philadelphia Eagles ===
Bradley was selected by the Philadelphia Eagles in the third round of the 2007 NFL draft.

On December 23, 2007 Bradley had his first sack, and first interception in an Eagles win over the New Orleans Saints in the Superdome. Bradley finished with six tackles, one sack and one interception. During the game, he also essentially single-handedly stopped the Saints from scoring from inside the five-yard line four plays in a row. Bradley became the first player in NFL history to start in his first NFL game and make his first interception and first sack at the same time.

In 2007, Bradley was a solid reserve linebacker and key special teams performer in his rookie campaign, finishing 2nd on the team in special teams tackles (17) and 3rd in special teams production points (257).

Sheldon Brown, a starting cornerback for the Browns said that Bradley reminded him of Brian Urlacher in terms of his body type and athletic ability.

On January 6, 2009, Bradley was named to the 2008 Sports Illustrated All-Pro team in only his first year as a starter.

Bradley tore his ACL during Eagles Flight Night, a night where fans can watch the players practice at Lincoln Financial Field, before the 2009 season on August 2, 2009. He was placed on injured reserve on September 1, and missed the entire season.

=== Arizona Cardinals ===
Bradley was signed by the Arizona Cardinals on July 29, 2011. In a move to gain salary cap relief, Bradley was cut on March 1, 2013.

=== Denver Broncos ===
Bradley was signed by the Denver Broncos on March 13, 2013. He was placed on injured reserve by the Broncos on August 31, 2013, ending his season.

== NFL career statistics ==
Legend
**Bold**	Career high

=== Regular season ===
Year	Team	Games		Tackles					Interceptions					Fumbles			
Year	Team	GP	GS	Cmb	Solo	Ast	Sck	TFL	Int	Yds	TD	Lng	PD	FF	FR	Yds	TD
2007	PHI	16	1	29	22	7	**1.0**	7	**1**	13	0	13	1	0	0	0	0
2008	PHI	16	16	**108**	**86**	**22**	**1.0**	**10**	**1**	**17**	0	**17**	**6**	**1**	**1**	0	0
2010	PHI	12	12	60	49	11	**1.0**	5	**1**	0	0	0	**6**	0	0	0	0
2011	ARI	16	1	31	21	10	0.0	1	0	0	0	0	2	0	0	0	0
2012	ARI	16	0	11	9	2	0.0	0	0	0	0	0	0	0	0	0	0
		76	30	239	187	52	3.0	23	3	30	0	17	15	1	1	0	0

=== Postseason ===
Year	Team	Games		Tackles					Interceptions					Fumbles			
Year	Team	GP	GS	Cmb	Solo	Ast	Sck	TFL	Int	Yds	TD	Lng	PD	FF	FR	Yds	TD
2008	PHI	3	3	26	19	7	0.0	0	0	0	0	0	1	0	0	0	0
		3	3	26	19	7	0.0	0	0	0	0	0	1	0	0	0	0

== Personal life ==
On February 6, 2009, New York Magazine reported that Bradley had accepted an internship at Elle, mirroring the recent hiring of Sean Avery at Vogue. Stewart is married to Hailey Hernandez from Sacramento, California.
