= 2005 Philadelphia Eagles season =

73rd season in franchise history

- Owner: Jeffrey Lurie
- General manager: Andy Reid
- Head coach: Andy Reid
- Home stadium: Lincoln Financial Field

Results
- Record: 6–10
- Division place: 4th NFC East
- Playoffs: Did not qualify
- Pro Bowlers: LB Jeremiah Trotter; S Brian Dawkins; LS Mike Bartrum

The 2005 season was the Philadelphia Eagles' 73rd season in the National Football League, and their seventh under head coach Andy Reid. After making the playoffs every season since 2000 and winning the past four NFC East crowns, the Eagles failed to improve on their 13–3 record from 2004 and fell to 6–10, missing the playoffs and finished with a losing record for the first time since 1999. The main cause of this was due to injuries and contract disputes with players like Terrell Owens and Brian Westbrook, and as a result it caused chaos upon the Eagles' chances in their post-Super Bowl season. In the 2004 season, Philadelphia had swept its division rivals, but they became the first team to reverse that feat in its next season, going 0–6 against the NFC East in 2005.

The Eagles would not have another losing season until 2012.

After the Super Bowl, the future looked bright for the team, but the onset of the Owens controversy in the summer began to cloud that outlook. The Eagles got out to a 3–1 record, but there were signs of trouble from the start. Contract disputes with Owens and Brian Westbrook created ugly distractions, and the team was criticized for not replacing departed defensive ends Derrick Burgess and Corey Simon. Around the middle of the season, the injuries began to take a devastating toll. Quarterback Donovan McNabb, running back Brian Westbrook, wide receiver Todd Pinkston, offensive tackle Tra Thomas, defensive end Jerome McDougle, center Hank Fraley, cornerback Lito Sheppard, and running back Correll Buckhalter were all at some point lost for the season. Moreover, kicker David Akers and punter Dirk Johnson also battled injuries and missed time during the year.

The Owens situation boiled to a head in early November, with the team essentially suspending the outspoken receiver for the rest of the season. The rash of injuries, meanwhile, revealed a disturbing lack of depth on the team, especially in the quarterback position and defensive line. The Eagles lost eight of their final ten games, led at quarterback by the athletic, but inept, Mike McMahon.

In the seven games he did play, Owens caught six touchdowns with 763 receiving yards. Rookie Reggie Brown showed promise after Owens' suspension, grabbing four touchdowns, as did rookie running back Ryan Moats, who had three late-season touchdowns. The team's two Pro Bowlers came from the defense – middle linebacker Jeremiah Trotter and safety Brian Dawkins. However, for the most part, the Eagles' pass defense suffered due to the poor pass rush.

== Staff ==
2005 Philadelphia Eagles staff
| Front office: Chairman/Chief Executive Officer – Jeffrey Lurie; President – Joe Banner; Executive vice president of football operations – Andy Reid; Vice president of player personnel – Tom Heckert; Assistant director of player personnel – Jason Licht; Director of pro personnel – Scott Cohen; Head coaches: Head coach – Andy Reid; Assistant head coach/offensive coordinator – Marty Mornhinweg; Assistant to the head coach – James Urban; Offensive coaches: Offensive coordinator – Brad Childress; Quarterbacks – Pat Shurmur; Running backs – Ted Williams; Wide receivers – David Culley; Tight ends – Tom Melvin; Offensive line – Juan Castillo; Offensive assistant/quality control – Bill Shuey; Statistical analysis coordinator – Mike Frazier | Defensive coaches: Defensive coordinator – Jim Johnson; Defensive line – Tommy Brasher; Linebackers – Steve Spagnuolo; Secondary – Trent Walters; Safeties – Sean McDermott; Defensive assistant/quality control – Mike Reed; Special teams coaches: Special teams coordinator – John Harbaugh; Special teams quality control – Ted Daisher; Strength and conditioning: Head athletic trainer – Rick Burkholder; Strength and conditioning – Mike Wolf; Assistant strength and conditioning – Tom Kanavy; Assistant strength and conditioning – Bob Rogucki; Assistant trainer – Eric Sugarman |

== Philadelphia Eagles Draft ==
2005 Philadelphia Eagles draft
| Round | Pick | Player | Position | College | Notes |
| 1 | 31 | Mike Patterson | DT | USC | |
| 2 | 35 | Reggie Brown | WR | Georgia | From Miami |
| 2 | 63 | Matt McCoy | OLB | San Diego State | |
| 3 | 77 | Ryan Moats | RB | Louisiana Tech | From Kansas City |
| 4 | 102 | Sean Considine | S | Iowa | From San Francisco |
| 4 | 126 | Todd Herremans | OT | Saginaw Valley State | From Denver via Cleveland, Seattle, Carolina, Green Bay |
| 5 | 146 | Trent Cole * | DE | Cincinnati | From Washington |
| 5 | 172 | Scott Young | OT | BYU | Compensatory Pick |
| 6 | 211 | Calvin Armstrong | OT | Washington State | Compensatory Pick |
| 7 | 247 | Keyonta Marshall | DT | Grand Valley State | Compensatory Pick |
| 7 | 252 | David Bergeron | OLB | Stanford | Compensatory Pick |
Made roster † Pro Football Hall of Fame * Made at least one Pro Bowl during career

== Roster ==
=== Opening training camp roster ===
Philadelphia Eagles 2005 opening training camp roster
| Quarterbacks: 10 Koy Detmer; 9 Andy Hall; 4 Mike McMahon; 5 Donovan McNabb; Running backs: 28 Correll Buckhalter; 34 Reno Mahe; 22 Eric McCoo; 23 Ryan Moats; 49 Josh Parry FB; 35 Bruce Perry; 48 Jon Ritchie FB; 41 Thomas Tapeh FB; 36 Brian Westbrook; Wide receivers: -- Grant Adams; 86 Reggie Brown; 16 Justin Jenkins; -- Jared Jones; 83 Greg Lewis; 80 Billy McMullen; 81 Terrell Owens; 17 Carlos Perez; 87 Todd Pinkston; -- Robert Redd; -- Chauncey Stovall; -- Isaac West; Tight ends: 82 L. J. Smith; 41 Stephen Spach; -- Andy Thorn; -- James Whalen | Offensive linemen: 73 Shawn Andrews G; -- Calvin Armstrong OT; 61 Adrien Clarke G; 66 Trey Darilek G; 63 Hank Fraley C; 75 Dominic Furio C; 74 Branden Hall G; 79 Todd Herremans G; 77 Artis Hicks G; 67 Jamaal Jackson C; 69 Jon Runyan OT; 68 Steve Sciullo G; 64 Drew Strojny OT; 72 Tra Thomas OT; 71 Scott Young G; Defensive linemen: 58 Trent Cole DE; 53 Hugh Douglas DE; 96 Paul Grasmanis DT; 65 Jamaal Green DE; -- Norm Heuer DT; 94 N. D. Kalu DE; 93 Jevon Kearse DE; -- Keyonta Marshall DT; 95 Jerome McDougle DE; 98 Mike Patterson DT; 91 Sam Rayburn DT; 78 Hollis Thomas DT; 97 Darwin Walker DT | Linebackers: 57 Keith Adams OLB; -- David Bergeron LB; 55 Dhani Jones OLB; 59 Mike Labinjo MLB; 51 Matt McCoy OLB; -- Martin Patterson; 98 Greg Richmond OLB; 52 Jason Short OLB; 50 Mark Simoneau OLB; 54 Jeremiah Trotter MLB; Defensive backs: 24 Sheldon Brown CB; 37 Sean Considine SS; 20 Brian Dawkins FS; 29 Roderick Hood CB; 32 Michael Lewis SS; 46 Quintin Mikell SS; -- Corey Peoples S; 30 J. R. Reed FS; -- Linj Shell CB; 26 Lito Sheppard CB; -- Jeremy Thornburg FS; 21 Matt Ware CB; -- Aric Williams CB; 31 Dexter Wynn CB; Special teams: 2 David Akers K; 88 Mike Bartrum LS; 8 Dirk Johnson P; -- Jimmy Kibble K; -- Mark Mariscal P | Unrestricted free agents: 90 Corey Simon DT (Franchise); rookies in italics Roster updated 2005-07-29; 86 Active, 0 Inactive, 1 FA |

== Schedule ==
=== Preseason ===
| Week | Date | Opponent | Result | Record | Venue | Recap |
|---|---|---|---|---|---|---|
| 1 | August 15 | at Pittsburgh Steelers | **L** 31–38 | 0–1 | Heinz Field | Recap |
| 2 | August 20 | at Baltimore Ravens | **W** 20–14 | 1–1 | M&T Bank Stadium | Recap |
| 3 | August 26 | Cincinnati Bengals | **W** 27–17 | 2–1 | Lincoln Financial Field | Recap |
| 4 | September 1 | New York Jets | **L** 14–37 | 2–2 | Lincoln Financial Field | Recap |

=== Regular season ===
| Week | Date | Opponent | Result | Record | Venue | Recap |
|---|---|---|---|---|---|---|
| 1 | September 12 | at Atlanta Falcons | **L** 10–14 | 0–1 | Georgia Dome | Recap |
| 2 | September 18 | San Francisco 49ers | **W** 42–3 | 1–1 | Lincoln Financial Field | Recap |
| 3 | September 25 | Oakland Raiders | **W** 23–20 | 2–1 | Lincoln Financial Field | Recap |
| 4 | October 2 | at Kansas City Chiefs | **W** 37–31 | 3–1 | Arrowhead Stadium | Recap |
| 5 | October 9 | at **Dallas Cowboys** | **L** 10–33 | 3–2 | Texas Stadium | Recap |
| 6 | Bye | | | | | |
| 7 | October 23 | San Diego Chargers | **W** 20–17 | 4–2 | Lincoln Financial Field | Recap |
| 8 | October 30 | at Denver Broncos | **L** 21–49 | 4–3 | Invesco Field at Mile High | Recap |
| 9 | November 6 | at **Washington Redskins** | **L** 10–17 | 4–4 | FedExField | Recap |
| 10 | November 14 | **Dallas Cowboys** | **L** 20–21 | 4–5 | Lincoln Financial Field | Recap |
| 11 | November 20 | at **New York Giants** | **L** 17–27 | 4–6 | Giants Stadium | Recap |
| 12 | November 27 | Green Bay Packers | **W** 19–14 | 5–6 | Lincoln Financial Field | Recap |
| 13 | December 5 | Seattle Seahawks | **L** 0–42 | 5–7 | Lincoln Financial Field | Recap |
| 14 | December 11 | **New York Giants** | **L** 23–26 (OT) | 5–8 | Lincoln Financial Field | Recap |
| 15 | December 18 | at St. Louis Rams | **W** 17–16 | 6–8 | Edward Jones Dome | Recap |
| 16 | December 24 | at Arizona Cardinals | **L** 21–27 | 6–9 | Sun Devil Stadium | Recap |
| 17 | January 1 | **Washington Redskins** | **L** 20–31 | 6–10 | Lincoln Financial Field | Recap |

Note: Intra-division opponents are in bold text.

== Regular season ==
=== Roster ===
Philadelphia Eagles 2005 opening regular season roster
| Quarterbacks: 10 Koy Detmer; 4 Mike McMahon; 5 Donovan McNabb; Running backs: 25 Lamar Gordon; 34 Reno Mahe; 23 Ryan Moats; 49 Josh Parry FB; 36 Brian Westbrook; Wide receivers: 86 Reggie Brown; 83 Greg Lewis; 85 Darnerien McCants; 80 Billy McMullen; 81 Terrell Owens; Tight ends: 82 L. J. Smith; 41 Stephen Spach | Offensive linemen: 73 Shawn Andrews G; 76 Calvin Armstrong RT; 61 Adrien Clarke G; 66 Trey Darilek G; 63 Hank Fraley C; 79 Todd Herremans LT; 77 Artis Hicks G; 69 Jon Runyan RT; 72 Tra Thomas LT; Defensive linemen: 58 Trent Cole DE; 96 Paul Grasmanis DT; 94 N. D. Kalu DE; 93 Jevon Kearse DE; 98 Mike Patterson DT; 91 Sam Rayburn DT; 78 Hollis Thomas DT; 75 Juqua Thomas DE; 97 Darwin Walker DT | Linebackers: 57 Keith Adams OLB; 55 Dhani Jones OLB; 59 Mike Labinjo MLB; 51 Matt McCoy OLB; 52 Jason Short OLB; 50 Mark Simoneau OLB; 54 Jeremiah Trotter MLB; Defensive backs: 24 Sheldon Brown CB; 37 Sean Considine SS; 20 Brian Dawkins FS; 29 Roderick Hood CB; 32 Michael Lewis SS; 46 Quintin Mikell SS; 26 Lito Sheppard CB; 45 Jeremy Thornburg FS; 21 Matt Ware CB; 31 Dexter Wynn CB; Special teams: 2 David Akers K; 88 Mike Bartrum LS; 8 Dirk Johnson P | Reserve lists: 28 Correll Buckhalter RB (IR); 16 Justin Jenkins WR (IR); 95 Jerome McDougle DE (NF-Inj.); 87 Todd Pinkston WR (IR); 30 J. R. Reed FS (NF-Inj.); 98 Greg Richmond OLB (PUP); 41 Thomas Tapeh FB (PUP); Practice squad: 14 Michael Gasperson WR; 62 Alonzo Jackson DE; 67 Jamaal Jackson C; 65 Keyonta Marshall DT; 35 Bruce Perry RB; 19 Robert Redd CB/WR; 47 Andy Thorn TE; 71 Scott Young G; rookies in italics Roster updated 2005-09-05; 53 active, 7 inactive, 8 practice squad |

=== Game summaries ===
==== Week 1 ====
Week One: Philadelphia Eagles (0–0) at Atlanta Falcons (0–0)

| Quarter | 1 | 2 | 3 | 4 | Total |
|---|---|---|---|---|---|
| Eagles | 0 | 7 | 0 | 3 | 10 |
| Falcons | 14 | 0 | 0 | 0 | 14 |

at Georgia Dome • Atlanta, Georgia

- Date: September 12
- Game time: 9:00 p.m. EDT
- Game weather: Indoors (dome)
- Game attendance: 70,806
- Referee: Walt Coleman
- TV announcers (ABC): Al Michaels, John Madden and Michele Tafoya
- Gamebook

Game information

Eagles

- Donovan McNabb
  24/54, 257 Yds, TD, INT
- Brian Westbrook
  12 Rush, 47 Yds
- Terrell Owens
  7 Rec, 112 Yds

Falcons

- Michael Vick
  12/23, 156 Yds, INT
- Warrick Dunn
  21 Rush, 117 Yds
- Michael Jenkins
  3 Rec, 80 Yds

The Eagles' 2005 season-opener on Monday Night Football was more famous for what happened before the game, when Pro Bowl linebacker Jeremiah Trotter was ejected for a scuffle near mid-field during pregame warmups. The Eagles missed his presence as a run-stopper in the first quarter as Falcons' Warrick Dunn gained big yards and Michael Vick rushed for a touchdown. A couple of minutes later, Michael Jenkins caught a 58-yard bomb and T. J. Duckett scored from a yard out. Down 14–0, McNabb rallied the Eagles to a solid drive capped by a touchdown pass to Brian Westbrook. The defense was solid and gathered key turnovers for the rest of the game, but the offense could not make up the deficit. A field goal made it 14–10 in the fourth quarter, but with two minutes left and the ball at midfield, McNabb fired off four incomplete passes and the Eagles fell short in their rematch of the 2004 NFC Championship. McNabb, who suffered a bruised sternum, passed for 257 yards and a score, while Terrell Owens caught seven passes for 112 yards. Safety Brian Dawkins had two sacks, six tackles, forced a fumble, and intercepted a pass.

Scoring summary

| Quarter | Time | Drive | | | Team | Scoring information | Score | |
| Quarter | Time | Plays | Yards | TOP | Team | Scoring information | PHI | ATL |
|---|---|---|---|---|---|---|---|---|
| 1 | 3:06 | 6 | 58 | 2:45 | Falcons | Michael Vick 7-yard touchdown run, Todd Peterson kick good | 0 | 7 |
| 1 | 0:09 | 3 | 64 | 1:29 | Falcons | T.J. Duckett 1-yard touchdown run, Todd Peterson kick good | 0 | 14 |
| 2 | 11:21 | 9 | 78 | 3:48 | Eagles | Brian Westbrook 9-yard touchdown reception from Donovan McNabb, David Akers kick good | 7 | 14 |
| 4 | 9:20 | 10 | 54 | 3:54 | Eagles | 44-yard field goal by David Akers | 10 | 14 |
| "TOP" = time of possession. For other American football terms, see Glossary of American football. | | | | | | | 10 | 14 |

==== Week 2 ====
| Team | 1 | 2 | 3 | 4 | Total |
|---|---|---|---|---|---|
| 49ers | 0 | 0 | 3 | 0 | 3 |
| • Eagles | 14 | 14 | 7 | 7 | 42 |

- Date: September 18
- Location: Lincoln Financial Field, Philadelphia, Pennsylvania
- Game start: 1:00 p.m. EST
- Game weather: Cloudy; 79 °F (26 °C)
- TV announcers (Fox): Dick Stockton, Daryl Johnston and Tony Siragusa

There were shades of 2004 when the Eagles routed the San Francisco 49ers. In the opening series, Donovan McNabb found Terrell Owens wide open on a broken play and the two connected for a 68-yard touchdown. Later in the quarter, McNabb went to tight end L.J. Smith for the six-yard score. Owens got open on the left side in the second quarter and ran under a McNabb pass to score his second touchdown and the score was 21–0. Cornerback Lito Sheppard made an interception on the next play and returned the ball to the 49er two-yard line. McNabb promptly passed it out to Brian Westbrook for the easy touchdown. In a comical moment, linebacker Mark Simoneau booted home the extra point in place of kicker David Akers, who was momentarily resting a hamstring he had strained on the kickoff. Joe Nedney kicked a field goal for San Francisco in the third quarter, but McNabb came back with a touchdown pass to Greg Lewis. Running back Lamar Gordon added a rushing touchdown late as the Eagles came together and steamrolled the Niners by a score of 42–3. McNabb, who was playing slightly injured, had one of his best days ever – five touchdowns and 342 yards. Owens burned his old team for 143 yards and two scores, while L.J. Smith also had a big day, netting 119 yards and a touchdown. The win seemed to set the Eagles back on course after the opening night hiccup in Atlanta.

==== Week 3 ====
| Team | 1 | 2 | 3 | 4 | Total |
|---|---|---|---|---|---|
| Raiders | 7 | 3 | 0 | 10 | 20 |
| • Eagles | 0 | 6 | 14 | 3 | 23 |

- Date: September 25
- Location: Lincoln Financial Field, Philadelphia, PA
- Game start: 1:00 p.m. EST
- Game weather: 78 °F (26 °C) (Cloudy)
- TV announcers (CBS): Dick Enberg, Dan Dierdorf and Armen Keteyian

Scoring summary
| Q1 | 12:32 | OAK | Jordan 8 yard pass from Collins (Janikowski kick) | OAK 7–0 |
| Q2 | 4:39 | PHI | Westbrook 18 yard run (kick blocked) | OAK 7–6 |
| Q2 | :49 | OAK | Janikowski 28 yard field goal | OAK 10–6 |
| Q3 | 10:20 | PHI | Owens 4 yard pass from McNabb (Akers kick) | PHI 13–10 |
| Q3 | :45 | PHI | Westbrook 5 yard pass from McNabb (Akers kick) | PHI 20–10 |
| Q4 | 12:54 | OAK | Janikowski 26 yard field goal | PHI 20–13 |
| Q4 | 2:17 | OAK | Gabriel 27 yard pass from Collins (Janikowski kick) | Tie 20–20 |
| Q4 | :09 | PHI | Akers 23 yard field goal | PHI 23–20 |

A visibly wounded Eagles team found a way to come out on top in Week 3 against the visiting Oakland Raiders. The game began inauspiciously as David Akers crumpled to the field in pain from a torn hamstring attempting to boot the opening kickoff. The Raiders took advantage of the good field position and marched to a touchdown with Lamont Jordan taking a short pass and scampering into the end zone. Donovan McNabb, who was clearly bothered by a recently diagnosed sports hernia, was limited compared to his normal mobility. Brian Westbrook scored on an 18-yard run in the second quarter, but Mark Simoneau, who had humorously made a PAT in the laugher against San Francisco, missed the extra point leaving the Eagles behind 7–6. Oakland got a field goal to make it 10–6 at the half. McNabb led the Eagles down the field to start the third quarter, with Terrell Owens collecting a short touchdown pass. Akers, with a heavily taped leg, was able to painfully boot through the extra point. A few minutes later, Westbrook broke a short pass for a 62-yard gain, and he made the touchdown reception four plays later. Akers again kicked the extra point and the Philadelphia lead increased to 20–10. The Raiders rallied in the fourth quarter, getting a Sebastian Janikowski field goal and a Doug Gabriel 27-yard touchdown reception to tie the game with four minutes left. Using a series of short passes to Westbrook and Owens, McNabb guided the Eagles to the Oakland 5-yard line. The injured Akers came on and booted the 23-yard field goal with :12 left before collapsing in pain. The game had been won in courageous fashion, but the Eagles looked worn down and the season had scarcely begun. McNabb threw for 356 yards and two touchdowns and Westbrook had a big game, racking up 208 all-purpose yards and two touchdowns.

==== Week 4 ====
| Team | 1 | 2 | 3 | 4 | Total |
|---|---|---|---|---|---|
| • Eagles | 0 | 13 | 11 | 13 | 37 |
| Chiefs | 10 | 14 | 0 | 7 | 31 |

- Date: October 2
- Location: Arrowhead Stadium, Kansas City, MO
- Game start: 4:15 p.m. EST
- Game weather: Partly cloudy; 83 °F (28 °C)
- TV announcers (Fox): Joe Buck, Troy Aikman & Pam Oliver

The Eagles made a thrilling comeback against the Kansas City Chiefs in raucous Arrowhead Stadium in Week 4. Kansas City scored on its opening possession when Priest Holmes plunged into the endzone from three yards out. On their next drive, the Chiefs added a field goal. The Eagles turned the ball over on the ensuing kick return and Trent Green hit Eddie Kennison with an eight-yard touchdown reception and it was suddenly 17–0 Chiefs. After new Eagles kicker Todd France had his 40-yard field goal blocked, Sheldon Brown jumped a pass and returned the ball 40 yards for the touchdown to get the Eagles on the board. However, France's extra point was no good and Dante Hall returned the kickoff for a touchdown leaving the Eagles behind a daunting 24–6. However, the team rallied behind the ailing McNabb and began a comeback. McNabb found Terrell Owens for a touchdown late in the half, France made the point after, and it was 24–13. Early in the third quarter, coach Andy Reid put faith in France and the kicker booted home a 44-yard field goal. After two long passes to Owens, McNabb went to tight end Mike Bartrum in the end zone and Brian Westbrook for the two-point conversion to tie the game. The defense continued to hold Kansas City's running game in check and France made a 37-yarder to give Philadelphia the lead 27–24. Dante Hall fumbled the kickoff and the Eagles recovered, turning the mistake into a short L.J. Smith touchdown reception. Sheldon Brown picked off Green again and the resulting drive ended in a field goal making it 37–24 Eagles. The Chiefs added a late-score, but the run of 31 unanswered points by Philadelphia had made dust of Kansas City's early lead. McNabb, despite his sports hernia, turned in another big performance – 369 yards and three touchdown passes. Owens was the recipient of 171 of those yards and one of those touchdowns. The team was 3–1, but their wins over Oakland and Kansas City had been far from perfect.

==== Week 5 ====
| Team | 1 | 2 | 3 | 4 | Total |
|---|---|---|---|---|---|
| Eagles | 0 | 3 | 7 | 0 | 10 |
| • Cowboys | 17 | 10 | 3 | 3 | 33 |

- Date: October 9
- Location: Texas Stadium, Irving, TX
- TV announcers (Fox): Joe Buck, Troy Aikman and Pam Oliver

Carrying a ten-game winning streak against division opponents, the Eagles took on Bill Parcells' Dallas Cowboys. Quarterback Drew Bledsoe needed only four plays to lead the Cowboys to a touchdown to open the game. The Eagles defense made a nice goal-line stand on the Cowboys' next possession, but when Dallas got the ball back, Bledsoe connected with Terry Glenn for a 38-yard score, Glenn's second touchdown. A José Cortez field goal left the Eagles in another 17–0 hole. Donovan McNabb and the Eagles managed a field goal on their first drive of the second quarter, but there would be no comeback this week. Bledsoe tossed another touchdown pass, this one to Lousaka Polite, making it 24–3 Dallas. Bledsoe led the Cowboys to field-goal drives to end the half and to start the third quarter, leaving the Eagles behind 30–3. The only bright moment of the game for Philadelphia was Lito Sheppard stripping receiver Keyshawn Johnson of the ball in the third quarter and Sheldon Brown recovering and racing 80 yards for the touchdown, Brown's second defensive touchdown in as many weeks. The Eagles were held to a paltry 129 offensive yards in the embarrassing loss and their pass defense was mauled by Bledsoe.

==== Week 7 ====
| Team | 1 | 2 | 3 | 4 | Total |
|---|---|---|---|---|---|
| Chargers | 0 | 0 | 7 | 10 | 17 |
| • Eagles | 0 | 7 | 3 | 10 | 20 |

- Date: October 23
- Location: Lincoln Financial Field, Philadelphia, PA
- Game weather: 57 °F (14 °C) (Sunny)
- TV announcers (CBS): Dick Enberg, Dan Dierdorf and Armen Keteyian

Needing a win to offset an ugly loss in Dallas, the Eagles faced the San Diego Chargers and LaDainian Tomlinson, who had scored a touchdown in an NFL record-tying 18 straight games. The Eagles defense was surprisingly effective in muzzling Tomlinson, who finished with seven yards on 17 carries and was stopped for a loss on his first four carries. This helped keep the Chargers off the board in the first half. The Philadelphia offense finally took advantage when Donovan McNabb led them on a 12-play drive finished by a four-yard touchdown reception by Terrell Owens, the 100th of his career. The Eagles finished the half with an 11-play drive that took them inside the San Diego ten-yard line, but a completion in-bounds to L.J. Smith allowed the clock to run out before a field goal was kicked. In the third quarter, three-straight McNabb completions gave them 1st and goal from the San Diego five-yard line, but the drive stalled and they settled for a field goal. The Chargers got right back in the game with a 19-yard touchdown pass from Drew Brees to Keenan McCardell. When Brees found tight end Antonio Gates for a score early in the fourth quarter, the Chargers went ahead 14–10. McNabb was intercepted on the Eagles' next play and San Diego ended up with a field goal. Jeremiah Trotter's interception of Brees set up a 40-yard kick from Todd France that made it 17–13 San Diego. With less than four minutes left, the Eagles went for it on 4th and 1 from their own 30-yard line and failed to convert. Nate Kaeding set up to kick a 40-yard field goal to finish the Eagles. In the most exciting play of the Eagles' season, Quintin Mikell burst in from the left side and blocked the kick. The ball bounced right into the arms of Matt Ware who raced 65 yards to the end zone giving the Eagles an unbelievable lead. A last-ditch drive by the Chargers, who now trailed 20–17, actually reached deep into Philadelphia territory, but Sheldon Brown stripped receiver Reche Caldwell of the ball and the Eagles recovered. McNabb had 35 completions, but he threw two picks and only one touchdown. The Philadelphia defense forced three turnovers. The Eagles had snatched an incredible victory and their record improved to 4–2, and it was hoped that the thrilling win would serve as the springboard for a season-saving run.

==== Week 8 ====
| Team | 1 | 2 | 3 | 4 | Total |
|---|---|---|---|---|---|
| Eagles | 0 | 7 | 14 | 0 | 21 |
| • Broncos | 14 | 14 | 0 | 21 | 49 |

- Date: October 30
- Location: INVESCO Field, Denver, CO
- TV announcers (Fox): Dick Stockton, Troy Aikman and Pam Oliver

The 4–2 Eagles travelled out to Denver to take on the 5–2 Denver Broncos. The Eagles again started slow while Denver led 14–0 after one quarter, courtesy of touchdowns by running backs Mike Anderson and Kyle Johnson. Quarterback Jake Plummer had short passing touchdowns to Rod Smith and Stephen Alexander to go up 28–0. Philadelphia finally woke up at the end of half when Donovan McNabb found L.J. Smith for a one-yard touchdown. In the third quarter, McNabb threw short and to the right sideline for Terrell Owens, who got past star cornerback Champ Bailey and ran 91 yards for the touchdown. Later in the quarter, on a drive that featured a 46-yard completion to Owens, McNabb hit Brian Westbrook with a 14-yard touchdown throw and the Eagles had made it 28–21. With things beginning to resemble the Kansas City game, the Eagles began driving towards the Denver end zone early in the fourth quarter, but McNabb was intercepted by Domonique Foxworth at the Bronco 20-yard line. Plummer launched a 44-yard touchdown to Todd Devoe on the ensuing drive. A 67-yard run by Tatum Bell made it 42–21 and the Eagles' comeback hopes died. Bell added another touchdown as the Eagles fell by a lopsided 49–21 score. Bell and Mike Anderson both went over 100 yards rushing for Denver, while Owens had 151 receiving yards and a touchdown in what would be his last game as an Eagle. Later in the week, the team would suspend him indefinitely due to comments disparaging to the organization and McNabb on an ESPN interview.

==== Week 9 ====
| Team | 1 | 2 | 3 | 4 | Total |
|---|---|---|---|---|---|
| Eagles | 7 | 0 | 3 | 0 | 10 |
| • Redskins | 0 | 10 | 7 | 0 | 17 |

- Date: November 6
- Location: FedExField, Landover, MD
- Game start: 8:30PM ET/5:30PM PT
- TV announcers (ESPN): Mike Patrick, Joe Theismann, Paul Maguire and Suzy Kolber

Without Terrell Owens, the Eagles set about trying to save their playoff hopes with a game against the division-rival Washington Redskins, whom they had not lost to in four years. Donovan McNabb, still playing with a painful sports hernia, did his best to prove that he did not need Owens when he completed a 56-yard touchdown pass to rookie receiver Reggie Brown in the first quarter. However, the Redskins controlled the second quarter, getting a field goal and a Mike Sellers touchdown to take a 10–7 halftime lead. An 11-play third quarter drive netted Philadelphia a game-tying field goal, but Clinton Portis found the end zone on Washington's next possession to make it 17–10 Redskins. At the two-minute warning, the Eagles had 1st and 10 from the Washington 13-yard line, but they could not score and McNabb threw a game-ending interception to Ryan Clark on fourth down. McNabb passed for 304 yards and Brown had a strong debut, hauling in 94 receiving yards. The loss dropped the Eagles to 4–4.

==== Week 10 ====
| Team | 1 | 2 | 3 | 4 | Total |
|---|---|---|---|---|---|
| • Cowboys | 7 | 0 | 0 | 14 | 21 |
| Eagles | 7 | 7 | 3 | 3 | 20 |

- Date: November 14
- Location: Lincoln Financial Field, Philadelphia, PA
- Game weather: 52 °F (11 °C) (Mostly Cloudy)
- TV announcers (ABC): Al Michaels, John Madden and Michelle Tafoya

Needing a Monday Night win against the Dallas Cowboys to keep any kind of division title aspirations alive, the Eagles came out and outplayed Dallas for most of the game before collapsing in the final four minutes. Philadelphia scored on its opening drive, with Brian Westbrook taking a carry on the rightside into the endzone. A 58-yard pass from Drew Bledsoe to Peerless Price gave Dallas 1st and goal, and Marion Barber III took it in from a yard out to tie the game. A Lito Sheppard interception gave the Eagles the ball at the Dallas 19-yard line, and Donovan McNabb capitalized by bootlegging to the right for a two-yard touchdown run, the first rushing score of the year for the injured quarterback. In the third quarter, David Akers booted a 48-yarder, and in the fourth quarter, Akers added another field goal increasing Philadelphia's lead to 20–7. With less than four minutes left, Bledsoe quickly took Dallas down the field and hurled a 20-yard touchdown to Terry Glenn to make it 20–14. On the Eagles' second play of their ensuing drive, McNabb made a risky throw to the right side and Cowboys' safety Roy Williams jumped in front of it and returned the ball for a touchdown. McNabb was hobbled on the play which essentially ended the Eagles' season. Backup Mike McMahon came in and got the Eagles into Dallas territory, but a 60-yard kick from Akers failed. Trent Cole had two sacks and Westbrook rushed for 86 yards and a touchdown in the defeat, which marked the first time the Eagles had lost three in a row since 1999. McNabb, who had needed surgery all season, was now officially done for the year.

==== Week 11 ====
| Team | 1 | 2 | 3 | 4 | Total |
|---|---|---|---|---|---|
| Eagles | 0 | 0 | 10 | 7 | 17 |
| • Giants | 0 | 10 | 3 | 14 | 27 |

- Date: November 20
- Location: Giants Stadium, East Rutherford, NJ
- Game start: 1PM ET/10AM PT
- TV announcers (Fox): Joe Buck, Troy Aikman and Pam Oliver

With their season now all but completely lost, the Eagles, now led by backup quarterback Mike McMahon, dropped their four straight game. The New York Giants broke a scoreless tie with a 26-yard field goal early in the second quarter. A blocked punt later in the quarter led to a touchdown for the Giants and 10–0 deficit for Philadelphia. McMahon got his first touchdown of the season with a 22-yard pass to Reggie Brown. A 55-yard burst by New York running back Tiki Barber, who had 112 yards, led to a field goal to make it 13–7. The Eagles got 1st and goal from the one-yard line, but settled for a field goal that left them behind 13–10. Eli Manning came back with a short touchdown pass to Jeremy Shockey to make it 20–10. McMahon took the Eagles on a scoring drive to keep pace, with him sneaking it in himself from a yard out. However, Manning launched a 61-yard touchdown bomb to Plaxico Burress on the Giants' ensuing possession. Philadelphia could not score again and fell 27–17. McMahon passed for 298 yards and Jevon Kearse had three sacks and two forced fumbles, his best game as an Eagle. The team's record now slipped to 4–6 and they were 0–4 against their division.

==== Week 12 ====
| Team | 1 | 2 | 3 | 4 | Total |
|---|---|---|---|---|---|
| Packers | 7 | 7 | 0 | 0 | 14 |
| • Eagles | 10 | 0 | 3 | 6 | 19 |

- Date: November 27
- Location: Lincoln Financial Field, Philadelphia, PA
- Game start: 4:15PM ET/1:15PM PT
- Game weather: 52 °F (11 °C) (Sunny)
- TV announcers (Fox): Joe Buck, Troy Aikman and Pam Oliver

Scheduled to meet a struggling Green Bay Packers team, the Eagles had a good opportunity to snap their four-game losing streak. David Akers converted a 44-yard attempt in the first quarter. Matt Ware recovered a fumble on the resulting kickoff and Brian Westbrook went around the right end for a 27-yard touchdown. Green Bay running back Samkon Gado cut into the Eagles' lead with a 33-yard touchdown run. The Packers took a 14–10 lead behind a touchdown pass by Brett Favre in the second quarter. In the second half, the defense controlled the Green Bay offense while David Akers chipped away at the Packers' lead. He kicked a 38-yarder in the third quarter, then a 37-yarder in the fourth to give the Eagles the lead. The Packers muffed the kickoff again, allowing Akers to boot another field goal to make it 19–14. Westbrook, who rushed for 117 yards, had one of his best games of the season, as did Akers who converted all four of his field goal attempts. The Eagles had two interceptions and two fumble recoveries.

==== Week 13 ====
| Team | 1 | 2 | 3 | 4 | Total |
|---|---|---|---|---|---|
| • Seahawks | 14 | 21 | 7 | 0 | 42 |
| Eagles | 0 | 0 | 0 | 0 | 0 |

- Date: December 5
- Location: Lincoln Financial Field, Philadelphia, PA
- Game start: 9PM ET/6PM PT
- Game weather: 30 °F (−1 °C) (Light Snow)
- TV announcers (ABC): Al Michaels, John Madden and Sam Ryan

A Monday Night matchup with the 9–2 Seattle Seahawks in a blinding snowfall presented a potentially ugly night for the Eagles. The loss they would suffer would be quasi-historic. The Seahawks began the game with a relentless 16-play drive finished by an 11-yard touchdown pass from Matt Hasselbeck to Bobby Engram. Andre Dyson then intercepted Mike McMahon and returned it for a 72-yard touchdown. McMahon gave away an even uglier interception in the second quarter to Lofa Tatupu, who also returned it for a touchdown. Andy Reid benched McMahon and brought in Koy Detmer, who proceeded to throw an interception to Michael Boulware that was returned to the Eagles' two-yard line. Shaun Alexander took it in for a short touchdown, then collected another score later in the second quarter and it was now a shocking 35–0 game. Rookie Ryan Moats replacing the injured Brian Westbrook after halftime, fumbled his first carry and Dyson returned it for a touchdown to make it 42–0. The Philadelphia offense could do nothing the rest of the game in the most lopsided loss of the Andy Reid era. It was the tied for the worst loss in Monday Night history, and was the worst shutout loss. It was also the third worst defeat in Eagles' history. Due to three defensive touchdowns, the Seahawks amazingly scored 42 points with less than 200 yards of offense. Worse still for the Eagles, Westbrook was ruled out for the year after spraining his foot in the second quarter.

==== Week 14 ====
| Team | 1 | 2 | 3 | 4 | OT | Total |
|---|---|---|---|---|---|---|
| • Giants | 7 | 10 | 3 | 3 | 3 | 26 |
| Eagles | 7 | 10 | 0 | 6 | 0 | 23 |

- Date: December 11
- Location: Lincoln Financial Field, Philadelphia, PA
- Game start: 4PM ET/1PM PT
- Game weather: 37 °F (3 °C) (Mostly Cloudy)
- TV announcers (Fox): Joe Buck, Troy Aikman and Pam Oliver

Six days after a thrashing at the hands of the Seahawks that showed them how far they had fallen, the Eagles took the playoff-bound NY Giants to overtime. The Giants scored on their opening drive, Tiki Barber the recipient of a short touchdown pass. Then, young Ryan Moats took a carry off the left side and outran the New York defense for a 40-yard touchdown. A quarterback sneak touchdown by Eli Manning and a Jay Feely field goal established a 17–7 Giants lead. However, Moats flashed his speed again on an 18-yard touchdown run and David Akers kicked a 42-yarder before halftime to tie it. Feely made a pair of short field goal to make it 23–17 by the early fourth quarter. However, Mike McMahon, who limited his mistakes, led the Eagles to drives that resulted in two Akers' field goals, the latter from 50 yards to tie the game. In the overtime, Osi Umenyiora sacked McMahon and forced a fumble that was recovered by New York. Feely made it from 36 yards out to win the game. Moats rushed for 114 yards and two touchdowns as the Eagles fell to 5–8.

==== Week 15 ====
| Team | 1 | 2 | 3 | 4 | Total |
|---|---|---|---|---|---|
| • Eagles | 7 | 0 | 3 | 7 | 17 |
| Rams | 3 | 10 | 3 | 0 | 16 |

- Date: December 18
- Location: Edward Jones Dome, St. Louis, MO
- Game start: 1:00 p.m. EST
- Game weather: Indoors (dome)
- TV announcers (Fox): Sam Rosen, Bill Maas and Dan McLaughlin

The Eagles and St. Louis Rams, both playoff teams in 2004 relegated to 5–8 records in 2005, played a close contest in Week 15, narrowly won by Philadelphia. A 13-play opening drive gave St. Louis a 3–0 lead, but on the Eagles' third play, Ryan Moats burst through for a 59-yard touchdown. In the second quarter, an interception from the hands of Mike McMahon gave Rams quarterback Ryan Fitzpatrick a chance to throw a fade touchdown pass to Torry Holt. A 53-yard field goal by Jeff Wilkins made it 13–7 St. Louis. The teams traded field goals in the third quarter. On the first play of the final quarter, McMahon found Mike Bartrum for a 3-yard touchdown pass and the Eagles went ahead 17–16. The defense held for the rest of the quarter and the Eagles had secured their first road win since Week 4. Despite three interceptions, McMahon had delivered the game-winning blow, Moats had 79 yards and another impressive touchdown, and Brian Dawkins had his third pick of the season.

==== Week 16 ====
| Team | 1 | 2 | 3 | 4 | Total |
|---|---|---|---|---|---|
| Eagles | 0 | 7 | 0 | 14 | 21 |
| • Cardinals | 6 | 7 | 7 | 7 | 27 |

- Date: December 24
- Location: Sun Devil Stadium, Tempe, AZ
- Game start: 4:05 p.m. EST
- Game weather: Sunny; 69 °F (21 °C)
- TV announcers (Fox): Ron Pitts, Tim Ryan and Kevin McCabe

On Christmas Eve, the depleted Eagles fell to the Arizona Cardinals in the final Cardinals game at Sun Devil Stadium. Neil Rackers, the league's best kicker in 2005, kicked two first quarter field goals. In the second quarter, Mike McMahon was yet again intercepted for a touchdown, this time by outside linebacker Karlos Dansby. McMahon got the points back with a one-yard quarterback sneak touchdown, but the Eagles still trailed 13–7. In the second half, Larry Fitzgerald and Anquan Boldin each had receiving touchdowns and Arizona stretched their lead to 27–7. McMahon tossed a 21-yard score to Billy McMullen, whose days in Philadelphia were clearly numbered. With less than a minute left, McMahon scored on another rushing touchdown as the Eagles lost 27–21. After two good performances, Ryan Moats was limited to 13 yards. Jeremiah Trotter and Brian Dawkins combined for 16 tackles.

==== Week 17 ====
| Team | 1 | 2 | 3 | 4 | Total |
|---|---|---|---|---|---|
| • Redskins | 7 | 3 | 7 | 14 | 31 |
| Eagles | 10 | 7 | 3 | 0 | 20 |

- Date: January 1
- Location: Lincoln Financial Field, Philadelphia, PA
- Game start: 4:15PM ET/1:15PM PT
- Game weather: 44 °F (7 °C) (Cloudy)
- TV announcers (Fox): Joe Buck, Troy Aikman and Pam Oliver

In the season finale, the Eagles hoped to play spoiler to a Washington Redskins team needing a win to make the playoffs. Early on it looked like the Eagles may succeed. David Akers converted on a 49-yard field goal less than five minutes into the game. Mike Sellers scored on a short pass for Washington, but the Eagles followed that with two Reggie Brown touchdown receptions to take a 17–7 lead. Washington drew it to 17–10 with a field goal a minute before halftime. Clinton Portis' two-yard touchdown run evened things up, but Akers kicked another field goal to make it 20–17. Mistakes returned to sink the Eagles in the fourth quarter. Mike McMahon was picked off by Lemar Marshall and Portis took it 22 yards up the middle and into the end zone on the next play. After McMahon fumbled away the ball on the next drive, Koy Detmer came into the game. He was sacked and lost the ball, which was returned for a touchdown by Redskin safety Sean Taylor, sealing the win for Washington. Reggie Brown had 77 yards and two touchdowns, but six turnovers were too much to overcome for the Eagles.

== Final roster ==
Philadelphia Eagles 2005 final roster
| Quarterbacks: 10 Koy Detmer; 9 Andy Hall; 4 Mike McMahon; Running backs: 25 Lamar Gordon; 34 Reno Mahe; 23 Ryan Moats; 49 Josh Parry FB; 35 Bruce Perry; Wide receivers: 86 Reggie Brown; 19 Carl Ford; 83 Greg Lewis; 85 Darnerien McCants; 80 Billy McMullen; 81 Terrell Owens; Tight ends: 89 Chad Lewis; 82 L. J. Smith; 41 Stephen Spach | Offensive linemen: 73 Shawn Andrews G; 76 Calvin Armstrong RT; 61 Adrien Clarke G; 66 Trey Darilek G; 77 Artis Hicks; 67 Jamaal Jackson C; 69 Jon Runyan RT; 71 Scott Young G; Defensive linemen: 58 Trent Cole DE; 94 N. D. Kalu DE; 93 Jevon Kearse DE; 65 Keyonta Marshall DT; 98 Mike Patterson DT; 91 Sam Rayburn DT; 78 Hollis Thomas DT; 75 Juqua Thomas DE; 97 Darwin Walker DT | Linebackers: 57 Keith Adams OLB; 50 Justin Ena OLB; 55 Dhani Jones OLB; 51 Matt McCoy OLB; 59 Dedrick Roper OLB; 53 Mark Simoneau MLB; 54 Jeremiah Trotter MLB; Defensive backs: 42 Jack Brewer FS; 24 Sheldon Brown CB; 20 Brian Dawkins FS; 29 Roderick Hood CB; 32 Michael Lewis SS; 27 Quintin Mikell SS; 33 Donald Strickland CB; 21 Matt Ware CB; 31 Dexter Wynn CB; Special teams: 2 David Akers K; 88 Mike Bartrum LS; 7 Sean Landeta P | Reserve lists: 28 Correll Buckhalter RB (IR); 37 Sean Considine S (IR); 63 Hank Fraley C (IR); 96 Paul Grasmanis DT (IR); 79 Todd Herremans LT (IR); 16 Justin Jenkins WR (IR); 8 Dirk Johnson P (IR); 95 Jerome McDougle DE (NF-Inj.); 5 Donovan McNabb QB (IR); 87 Todd Pinkston WR (IR); 30 J. R. Reed S (NF-Inj.); 56 Greg Richmond OLB (PUP); 26 Lito Sheppard CB (IR); 52 Jason Short OLB (IR); 41 Thomas Tapeh FB (PUP); 72 Tra Thomas LT (IR); 36 Brian Westbrook RB (IR); Practice squad: 22 Eddie Canonico CB; 48 Jonas Crafts TE; 74 Dominic Furio C; 14 Michael Gasperson WR; 62 Carlos Joseph OT; 68 Darrell Lee DE; 47 Andy Thorn TE; 64 Mike Watson OT; rookies in italics Roster updated 2005-12-20; 53 active, 17 inactive, 8 practice squad |

== Standings ==
NFC East
| | W | L | T | PCT | DIV | CONF | PF | PA | STK |
|---|---|---|---|---|---|---|---|---|---|
| ^{(4)} New York Giants | 11 | 5 | 0 | .688 | 4–2 | 8–4 | 422 | 314 | W1 |
| ^{(6)} Washington Redskins | 10 | 6 | 0 | .625 | 5–1 | 10–2 | 359 | 293 | W5 |
| Dallas Cowboys | 9 | 7 | 0 | .563 | 3–3 | 7–5 | 325 | 308 | L1 |
| Philadelphia Eagles | 6 | 10 | 0 | .375 | 0–6 | 3–9 | 310 | 388 | L2 |

== See also ==
- List of NFL teams affected by internal conflict
