= 2005 New York Giants season =

NFL team season

- Owner: Wellington Mara; Bob Tisch
- General manager: Ernie Accorsi
- Head coach: Tom Coughlin
- Home stadium: Giants Stadium

Results
- Record: 11–5
- Division place: 1st NFC East
- Playoffs: Lost Wild Card Playoffs (vs. Panthers) 0–23
- Pro Bowlers: 5: RB Tiki Barber; TE Jeremy Shockey; DE Michael Strahan; DE Osi Umenyiora; ST David Tyree

The 2005 New York Giants season was the franchise's 81st season in the National Football League (NFL) and second under head coach Tom Coughlin. The Giants finished the regular season with 11–5 record and came in first place of the NFC East. However, they would be shut out at home by the Carolina Panthers in the Wild Card round of the playoffs 23–0.

== Offseason ==
In the 2005 offseason the Giants acquired former Steelers’ wide receiver Plaxico Burress, former Jets offensive tackle Kareem McKenzie and former Redskins linebacker Antonio Pierce as free agents. Also, during the 2005 draft, the Giants used their first pick on Louisiana State cornerback Corey Webster. They then used their next pick on Notre Dame defensive end Justin Tuck. The rest of their picks included Southern Illinois running back Brandon Jacobs and Florida State defensive end Eric Moore.

=== Draft ===
2005 New York Giants draft
Round	Pick	Player	Position	College	Notes
2	43	Corey Webster	CB	LSU	
3	74	Justin Tuck *	DE	Notre Dame	
4	110	Brandon Jacobs	RB	Southern Illinois	
6	186	Eric Moore	DE	Florida State	
Made roster † Pro Football Hall of Fame * Made at least one Pro Bowl during career

=== Undrafted free agents ===
2005 undrafted free agents of note
Player	Position	College
Chase Blackburn	Linebacker	Akron
James Butler	Safety	Georgia Tech
Ryan Grant	Running back	Notre Dame
Matt LoVecchio	Quarterback	Indiana
Cameron Wake	Linebacker	Penn State

== Roster ==
2005 New York Giants roster
Quarterbacks (QB): 8 Tim Hasselbeck; 12 Jared Lorenzen; 10 Eli Manning; Running backs (RB): 21 Tiki Barber; 30 Mike Cloud; 20 Jim Finn FB; 27 Brandon Jacobs; 29 Chad Morton; Wide receivers (WR): 17 Plaxico Burress; 84 Tim Carter; 87 Willie Ponder; 81 Amani Toomer; 85 David Tyree; Tight ends (TE): 83 Matt Kranchick; 82 Visanthe Shiancoe; 80 Jeremy Shockey	Offensive linemen (OL): 66 David Diehl G; 61 Lewis Kelly G; 67 Kareem McKenzie OT; 60 Shaun O'Hara C; 77 Luke Petitgout OT; 69 Rich Seubert G; 76 Chris Snee G; 71 Bob Whitfield OT; 65 Jason Whittle G; Defensive linemen (DL): 97 Kenderick Allen DT; 95 Adrian Awasom DE; 70 Kendrick Clancy DT; 99 Damane Duckett DT; 94 William Joseph DT; 93 Eric Moore DE; 98 Fred Robbins DT; 92 Michael Strahan DE; 91 Justin Tuck DE; 72 Osi Umenyiora DE	Linebackers (LB): 96 Jay Foreman OLB; 54 Nick Greisen OLB; 59 Alonzo Jackson OLB; 44 Kevin Lewis MLB; 55 Roman Phifer OLB; 58 Antonio Pierce MLB; 53 Reggie Torbor OLB; Defensive backs (DB): 26 Brent Alexander FS; 25 Will Allen CB; 22 Terrell Buckley CB; 37 James Butler SS; 39 Curtis DeLoatch CB; 41 Frank Walker CB; 23 Corey Webster CB; 28 Gibril Wilson SS; Special teams (ST): 18 Jeff Feagles P; 2 Jay Feely K; 90 Ryan Kuehl LS	Practice squad: 78 Jon Doty OT; 45 Wade Fletcher TE; 38 Gabe Franklin CB; 47 Ryan Grant RB; 15 Michael Jennings WR; 46 Marcus Lawrence OLB; 75 Jonas Seawright DT; 73 Myniya SmithOT; Reserve: 88 Sean Berton TE (IR); 57 Chase Blackburn MLB (IR); -- Lamont Brightful CB (IR); 51 Carlos Emmons OLB (IR); 52 Barrett Green OLB (IR); 24 Will Peterson CB (IR); 86 Jamaar Taylor WR (IR); 34 Derrick Ward RB (IR); 36 Shaun Williams S (IR); Rookies in italics 53 active, 9 reserve, 8 practice squad

== Preseason ==
Week	Date	Opponent	Result	Record	Venue
1	August 13	at Cleveland Browns	L 14–17	0-1	Cleveland Browns Stadium
2	August 20	Carolina Panthers	W 27–21	1–1	Giants Stadium
3	August 23	New York Jets	W 15–14	2–1	Giants Stadium
4	September 1	at New England Patriots	W 27–3	3–1	Gillette Stadium

== Regular season ==
The Giants won their first two games of the season, against the Arizona Cardinals (42–19) and a second game at the Meadowlands against the New Orleans Saints. The game was originally slated to be a home game for the Saints but had to be moved since the city of New Orleans was still recovering from Hurricane Katrina, and the Louisiana Superdome was untenable after being used as an emergency shelter for locals displaced by the hurricane. Despite the Saints wearing their home colors and the Saints colors and logo being painted in one of the end zones, the game was a de facto home game for the Giants who won easily, 27–10. The Giants lost to the Chargers the following week, 45–23, in a game which was marked by Chargers fans booing and jeering Eli Manning for refusing to play for the Chargers. Manning and the Giants rebounded the following week however, and beat the St. Louis Rams by a score of 44–24.

Through eight games, Burress, in a bid to become the first Giant wideout to make the Pro Bowl in 37 years, had 45 catches and five scores. Jeremy Shockey, who had not been as effective as he was in his rookie season, also was beginning to re-emerge with 32 catches and over 500 yards receiving after eight weeks.

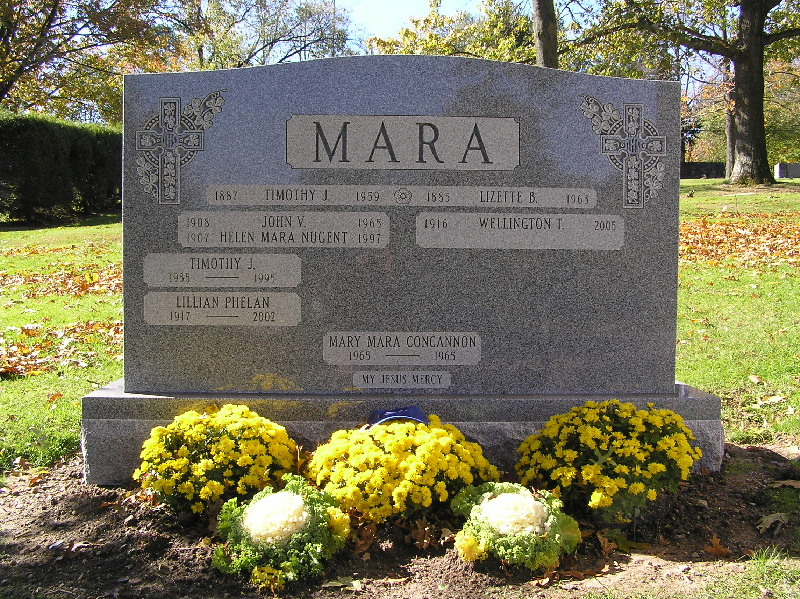
Wellington Mara's gravesite

On October 25, 2005, beloved Giants patriarch Wellington Mara died after a brief illness, at the age of 89. Mara had been involved with the Giants since he was 9 years old, when he was a ball boy for the Giants. Except a tour of duty in the military during World War II, Mara spent his entire adult life with the Giants. The New York Giants dedicated their next game to Mara, and shut out the Washington Redskins 36–0. Afterwards, the Giants went on the road and defeated the San Francisco 49ers 24–6, but when they got home, lost to the Minnesota Vikings 24–21. Just twenty days after Mara's death, on November 15, 2005, the other Giants Executive Officer and well-known businessman Bob Tisch died at the age of 79. He was diagnosed in 2004 with inoperable brain cancer. Tisch was a philanthropist all his life and donated considerable sums of money to charitable causes. After his diagnosis, he donated money to institutions aimed towards the research of drugs and treatments to control brain tumors.

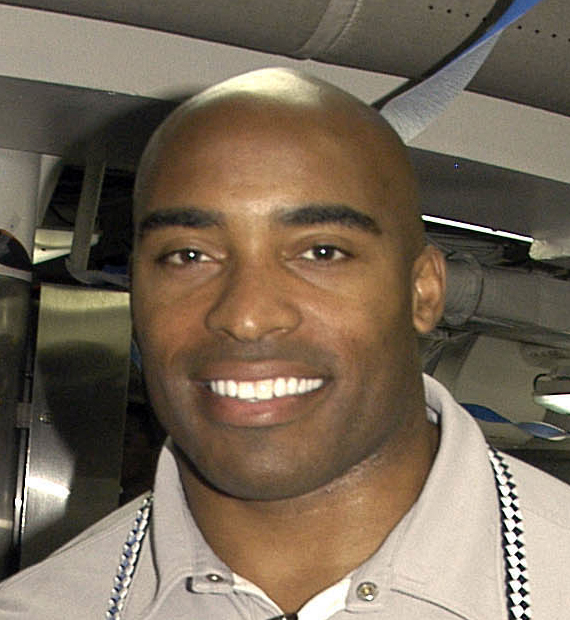
Tiki Barber set Giants single season and single game rushing records in 2005.

The Giants then traveled to Seattle to play the Seahawks. With the score tied at 21, kicker Jay Feely missed three field goals that would have given the Giants the lead. The Giants lost 24–21 when Josh Brown kicked a 36-yard field goal. The Giants then defeated the Cowboys 17–10. the Giants defense made opposing QB Drew Bledsoe go 15 of 39 for 146 yards with only one touchdown pass and two interceptions. The Giants then traveled to Philadelphia, Pennsylvania and defeated the defending NFC champion Eagles 26–23.

During the season, the Giants and their stadium mates, the New York Jets, announced plans for a new stadium to replace Giants Stadium for both teams. Construction of said stadium began in 2007 and continued for two years, and the venue opened in 2010 as New Meadowlands Stadium. In 2011 naming rights would be bought by MetLife.

On December 17, 2005, in their 27–17 home victory against the Kansas City Chiefs, Tiki Barber set the team's single game rushing yard record with 220 yards, breaking the previous record of 218 yards, which had been set by Gene Roberts on November 12, 1950.

The Giants were able to clinch at least a wild card berth without playing when the Minnesota Vikings fell to the Baltimore Ravens 30–23 in week 16. The Giants then won the NFC East title for the first time since 2000 with a 30–21 win against the Oakland Raiders. The team's appearance in the playoffs was their 27th, tied with the Cowboys and the Rams for the most ever by an NFL team.

== Regular season schedule ==
Week	Date	Opponent	Result	Record	Venue	Recap
1	September 11	Arizona Cardinals	W 42–19	1–0	Giants Stadium	Recap
2	September 19	at New Orleans Saints	W 27–10	2–0	Giants Stadium	Recap
3	September 25	at San Diego Chargers	L 23–45	2–1	Qualcomm Stadium	Recap
4	October 2	St. Louis Rams	W 44–24	3–1	Giants Stadium	Recap
5	Bye					
6	October 16	at Dallas Cowboys	L 13–16 (OT)	3–2	Texas Stadium	Recap
7	October 23	Denver Broncos	W 24–23	4–2	Giants Stadium	Recap
8	October 30	Washington Redskins	W 36–0	5–2	Giants Stadium	Recap
9	November 6	at San Francisco 49ers	W 24–6	6–2	Monster Park	Recap
10	November 13	Minnesota Vikings	L 21–24	6–3	Giants Stadium	Recap
11	November 20	Philadelphia Eagles	W 27–17	7–3	Giants Stadium	Recap
12	November 27	at Seattle Seahawks	L 21–24 (OT)	7–4	Qwest Field	Recap
13	December 4	Dallas Cowboys	W 17–10	8–4	Giants Stadium	Recap
14	December 11	at Philadelphia Eagles	W 26–23 (OT)	9–4	Lincoln Financial Field	Recap
15	December 17	Kansas City Chiefs	W 27–17	10–4	Giants Stadium	Recap
16	December 24	at Washington Redskins	L 20–35	10–5	FedExField	Recap
17	December 31	at Oakland Raiders	W 30–21	11–5	McAfee Coliseum	Recap

== Playoffs ==
While the Giants exceeded expectations in 2005, it came at the cost of key players suffering injuries over the course of the long season. An undermanned, and then depleted Giants squad lost 23–0 to the Carolina Panthers in the wild card round.

Round	Date	Opponent (seed)	Result	Record	Venue	Recap
Wild Card	January 8, 2006	Carolina Panthers (5)	L 0–23	0–1	Giants Stadium	Recap

== Game summary ==
=== Week 14 ===
Week 14: New York Giants at Philadelphia Eagles – Game summary

Quarter	1	2	3	4	OT	Total
Giants	7	10	3	3	3	26
Eagles	7	10	0	6	0	23

at Lincoln Financial Field, Philadelphia, Pennsylvania

- Date: December 11
- Game time: 4:05 p.m. EST
- Game weather: Mostly cloudy, 38 °F (3 °C)
- Game attendance: 67,443
- Referee: Gerry Austin (34)
- TV announcers (Fox): Joe Buck, Troy Aikman and Pam Oliver
- Recap, Game Book

Game information

First quarter

- NYG – Tiki Barber 4-yard pass from Eli Manning (Jay Feely kick), 9:22. Giants 7–0. Drive: 12 plays, 73 yards, 5:38.
- PHI – Ryan Moats 40-yard run (David Akers kick), 7:52. Tied 7–7. Drive: 4 plays, 67 yards, 1:30.

Second quarter

- NYG – Eli Manning 1-yard run (Jay Feely kick), 12:31. Giants 14–7. Drive: 10 plays, 60 yards, 5:17.
- NYG – Jay Feely 24-yard field goal, 4:59. Giants 17–7. Drive: 12 plays, 60 yards, 6:00.
- PHI – Ryan Moats 18-yard run (David Akers kick), 1:53. Giants 17–14. Drive: 6 plays, 80 yards, 3:06.
- PHI – David Akers 42-yard field goal, 0:21. Tied 17–17. Drive: 6 plays, 27 yards, 0:45.

Third quarter

- NYG – Jay Feely 21-yard field goal, 3:17. Giants 20–17. Drive: 14 plays, 57 yards, 7:37.

Fourth quarter

- NYG – Jay Feely 27-yard field goal, 10:39. Giants 23–17. Drive: 7 plays, 46 yards, 4:47.
- PHI – David Akers 36-yard field goal, 6:28. Giants 23–20. Drive: 10 plays, 50 yards, 4:11.
- PHI – David Akers 50-yard field goal, 1:52. Tied 23–23. Drive: 6 plays, 25 yards, 1:36.

Overtime

- NYG – Jay Feely 36-yard field goal, 3:55. Giants 26–23. Drive: 4 plays, 9 yards, 1:43.

Top passers

- NYG – Eli Manning – 28/44, 312 yards, TD, 3 INT
- PHI – Mike McMahon – 14/32, 190 yards

Top rushers

- NYG – Tiki Barber – 32 rushes, 124 yards
- PHI – Ryan Moats – 11 rushes, 114 yards, 2 TD

Top receivers

- NYG – Jeremy Shockey – 10 receptions, 107 yards
- PHI – Reggie Brown – 5 receptions, 72 yards

== Standings ==
NFC East
	W	L	T	PCT	DIV	CONF	PF	PA	STK
^{(4)} New York Giants	11	5	0	.688	4–2	8–4	422	314	W1
^{(6)} Washington Redskins	10	6	0	.625	5–1	10–2	359	293	W5
Dallas Cowboys	9	7	0	.563	3–3	7–5	325	308	L1
Philadelphia Eagles	6	10	0	.375	0–6	3–9	310	388	L2
