= Quintin Mikell =

American football player (born 1980)

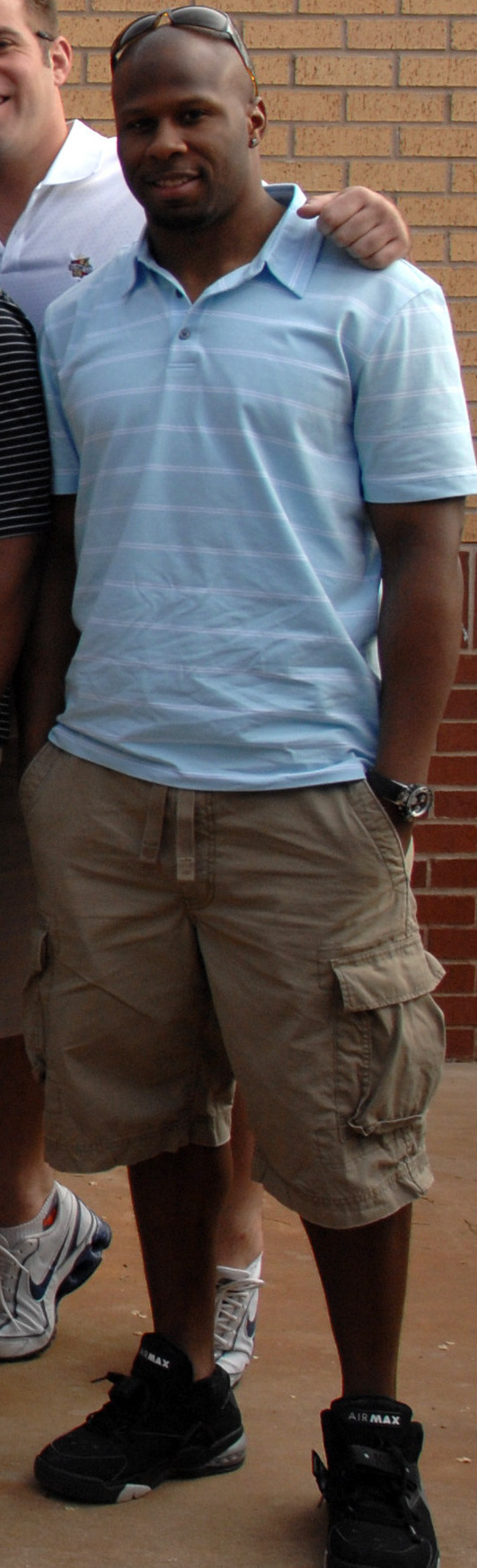
- Mikell in 2008

No. 46, 27
- Position: Safety

Personal information
- Born: September 16, 1980 (age 46); New Orleans, Louisiana, U.S.
- Listed height: 5 ft 10 in (1.78 m)
- Listed weight: 205 lb (93 kg)

Career information
- High school: Willamette (Eugene, Oregon)
- College: Boise State (1999–2002)
- NFL draft: 2003: undrafted

Career history
- Philadelphia Eagles (2003–2010); St. Louis Rams (2011–2012); Carolina Panthers (2013)

Awards and highlights
- 2× Second-team All-Pro (2008, 2010); Pro Bowl (2009); WAC Defensive Player of the Year (2002)

Career NFL statistics
- Total tackles: 697
- Sacks: 11
- Forced fumbles: 18
- Fumble recoveries: 9
- Interceptions: 12
- Defensive touchdowns: 1
- Stats at Pro Football Reference

Quintin Perry Mikell Jr. (born September 16, 1980) is an American former professional football player who was a safety for 11 seasons in the National Football League (NFL). After playing college football for the Boise State Broncos, he was signed by the Philadelphia Eagles as an undrafted free agent in 2003. He played for the Eagles for eight seasons, St. Louis Rams for two seasons, and Carolina Panthers for one season.

ESPN named him to their All-decade special teams for his contributions to punt and kickoff coverage.

== Early life ==
Mikell played high school football for the Willamette Wolverines in Eugene, Oregon. He also played basketball and ran track. His younger brother Darrian played AAU basketball for the Trotters. Quintin's youngest brother, Devyn, is a top ranked track & field recruit in Indiana.

== College career ==
Mikell attended the Boise State University, and played for the Boise State Broncos football team. He finished his career ranked second on the school's all-time tackles list (401).

== Professional career ==
Pre-draft measurables
Height	Weight
5 ft 9 3/4 in (1.77 m)	200 lb (91 kg)
Values from Pro Day

=== Philadelphia Eagles ===
After being undrafted in the 2003 NFL draft, Mikell signed with the Philadelphia Eagles.

He has posted a team-leading 108 special teams tackles since joining the Eagles, including a career-high 35 in 2006. As such, Mikell has been voted by his teammates as the Eagles special teams MVP in 2005 and 2006.

On defense, Mikell replaced the injured Sean Considine as the starting strong safety in 2007 and remained in that role through 2010.

On November 28, 2004, Mikell notched his first career interception, outjumping tight end Jeremy Shockey in the end zone for a pass thrown by quarterback Eli Manning late in the first half vs. the New York Giants. The play helped the Eagles preserve a 7–6 lead at halftime, and Philadelphia went on to win, 27–6, to clinch their fourth consecutive NFC East title.

Mikell was a backup safety behind Pro Bowlers Michael Lewis and Brian Dawkins for the 2004 NFC Championship team and played in Super Bowl XXXIX.

His most significant contribution on special teams came on October 23, 2005, when, with the Eagles trailing the San Diego Chargers, 17–13, late in the fourth quarter, he blocked a field goal attempt by placekicker Nate Kaeding (who to that point had not missed a field goal all season), which teammate Matt Ware returned 65 yards for a touchdown to secure a 20–17 win. It was the first time in Eagles history that a blocked field goal was returned for a touchdown.

In a Christmas Day win at Dallas in 2006, Mikell propelled the Eagles with a key tackle for loss of running back Marion Barber on fourth down to finish off a goal-line stand.

On February 27, 2007, Mikell inked a four-year contract with the Eagles, which prevented him from testing the free agent market.

On January 9, 2009, Mikell was voted as a member of the 2008 NFL All-Pro Second-Team Defense.

Mikell was named to the 2010 Pro Bowl after Adrian Wilson got hurt and Roman Harper could not play due to the Saints making it to Super Bowl XLIV.

=== St. Louis Rams ===
Mikell was signed by the St. Louis Rams on July 29, 2011. The team released him on March 11, 2013.

=== Carolina Panthers ===
Mikell was signed by the Carolina Panthers on September 2, 2013, to a one-year contract. Safety Haruki Nakamura was placed on injured reserve to open up spot on the 53-man roster. Mikell was expected to compete for the starting job at strong safety.

=== NFL statistics ===
Year	Team	Games	Combine Tackles	Tackles	Assisted Tackles	Sacks	Forced Fumbles	Fumble Recoveries	Fumble return yards	Interceptions	Interception return yards	Average Return Yards per Interception	Longest interception return	Interceptions returned for touchdown	PAss Defended	Stuffs	Stuff Yards	Kicks Blocked
2003	PHI	16	10	9	1	0.0	0	0	0	0	0	0	0	0	0	0	0	0
2004	PHI	14	24	20	4	0.0	1	1	0	1	0	0	0	0	1	1	0	0
2005	PHI	16	24	21	3	0.0	0	0	0	0	0	0	0	0	3	1	0	1
2006	PHI	16	42	31	11	0.0	1	0	0	0	0	0	0	0	1	1	3	0
2007	PHI	14	74	52	22	1.0	1	1	0	1	20	20	20	0	5	3	6	0
2008	PHI	16	93	68	25	2.0	2	0	0	3	53	18	41	0	9	1	12	0
2009	PHI	16	91	70	21	0.0	0	2	0	2	16	8	16	0	12	2	3	0
2010	PHI	15	88	77	11	1.0	1	3	52	3	0	0	0	0	15	5	16	0
2011	STL	16	91	75	16	1.0	5	1	14	2	11	6	11	0	5	3	8	0
2012	STL	16	101	83	18	3.0	4	0	0	0	0	0	0	0	2	2	5	0
2013	CAR	14	59	41	18	3.0	2	1	0	0	0	0	0	0	5	1	2	0
Total	Total	169	697	547	150	11.0	18	9	0	12	100	8	41	0	58	20	55	1

== Post-playing career ==
Mikell served one year as the director of player engagement for the Eagles.

== Personal life ==
Mikell returned to his native New Orleans, Louisiana, after Hurricane Katrina for the first time on October 13, 2006, the day before the Philadelphia Eagles would play the New Orleans Saints. He was heartbroken by the vast devastation and conditions of disaster still remaining at his grandmother's home and in her neighborhood one year after the hurricane. Philadelphia NBC 10 profiled his visit on an October 14, 2006, telecast.
