= Dirk Johnson =

American football player (born 1975)

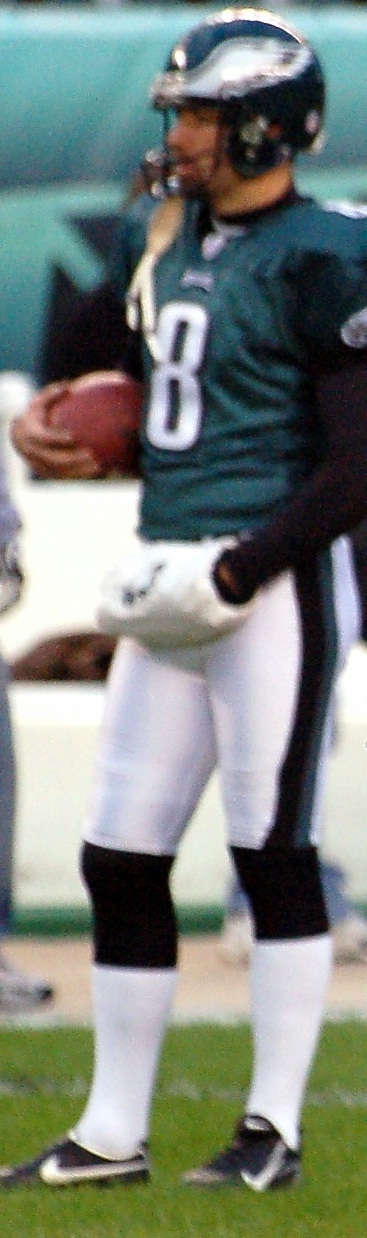
- Johnson in January 2007.

No. 6, 8, 10, 9
- Position: Punter

Personal information
- Born: June 1, 1975 (age 51); Hoxie, Kansas, U.S.
- Listed height: 6 ft 0 in (1.83 m)
- Listed weight: 210 lb (95 kg)

Career information
- College: Northern Colorado
- NFL draft: 1998: undrafted

Career history
- Seattle Seahawks (1998)*; New York Jets (1999)*; San Diego Chargers (2001)*; Rhein Fire) (2002); New Orleans Saints (2002); Philadelphia Eagles (2003–2006); Chicago Bears (2007); Arizona Cardinals (2008); Washington Redskins (2009)*; Pittsburgh Steelers (2009)*; Tampa Bay Buccaneers (2009)
- * Offseason or practice squad member only

Awards and highlights
- 3× Division II All-American (1995–1997); 3× First-team All-NCC (1995–1997)

Career NFL statistics
- Punts: 382
- Punting yards: 15,914
- Average punt: 41.7
- Longest punt: 63
- Inside 20: 110
- Stats at Pro Football Reference

Dirk Johnson (born June 1, 1975) is an American former professional football player who was a punter in the National Football League (NFL). He is most notable for his four-season tenure with the Philadelphia Eagles. After playing college football at Northern Colorado, Johnson signed with the Seattle Seahawks as an undrafted free agent in 1998. Johnson was also a member of the New York Jets, San Diego Chargers, New Orleans Saints, Chicago Bears, Arizona Cardinals, Washington Redskins, Pittsburgh Steelers and Tampa Bay Buccaneers. He now is an assistant coach for Montrose High School in Montrose, Colorado.

== College career ==
Johnson played college football as a punter and defensive back at the University of Northern Colorado. While there he was a three-time All-American selection (as a punter in 1995, as a defensive back and punter in 1996 and as a defensive back in 1997). He helped lead the UNC Bears to two NCAA Division II national championships (1996 and 1997). Johnson finished his college career ranked 2nd on the school's all-time list with a 40.8-yard career punting average. He was first-team All-North Central Conference at safety in 1997 and at punter in 1995 and 1996.

== Professional career ==
=== Seattle Seahawks ===
Johnson was signed as a rookie free agent by the Seattle Seahawks on April 28, 1998. He was released on August 25, 1998.

=== New York Jets ===
Johnson signed with the New York Jets on April 7, 1999. He was released on August 21, 1999.

=== San Diego Chargers ===
The San Diego Chargers signed Johnson on May 4, 2001. They released him on August 27, 2001.

=== New Orleans Saints ===
In 2002, Johnson played one game with the New Orleans Saints. In the spring of that same year he played with their NFL Europe team, the Rhein Fire, and appeared in the World Bowl.

=== Philadelphia Eagles ===
In 2003, Johnson was picked up by the Philadelphia Eagles as a free agent, beating out Kyle Richardson and Lee Johnson to win the starting punter job. Johnson played in all sixteen games during each of his first two seasons in Philadelphia. The team would go to back-to-back NFC Championship games, with an appearance in Super Bowl XXXIX. Following their Super Bowl loss to the Patriots, Johnson underwent sports hernia surgery during training camp. He returned in time to start the 2005 season, but aggravated the injury and missed the second half of the season, in what was an overall injury-plagued, down year for the defending NFC Champion Eagles. Reggie Hodges was signed to replace Johnson for the remainder of the season.

Entering the offseason as a free agent, Johnson re-signed with the Eagles to a one-year contract. Prior to the start of the 2006 season, Johnson signed a new five-year extension, as he was given additional duties of placekick holder for David Akers.

Though he played all sixteen regular season and both playoff games for the Eagles that season, the team brought in Saverio Rocca to compete with Johnson in training camp and through the 2007 preseason. Johnson was released on the final day of cuts. At the time of his release, Johnson was the Eagles all-time leader in net yards per punt (which has been a recorded stat since 1976).

=== Chicago Bears ===
The Chicago Bears signed Johnson on September 16, 2007, to temporarily replace veteran punter Brad Maynard, who sustained a minor injury in the previous week. After 4 punts with a 49.8 yard average and 60 yard long punt, Johnson also sustained an injury, and was replaced by place kicker Robbie Gould.

On September 24, 2007, the Bears released him.

=== Arizona Cardinals ===
Johnson was signed by the Arizona Cardinals on March 5, 2008. He appeared in 12 games for the Cardinals that season, punting 40 times for a 41.8-yard average. The Cardinals released him on December 1 in favor of Ben Graham, this became the second time Johnson has been cut in favor of an Australian punter.

=== Washington Redskins ===
Johnson was signed by the Washington Redskins on March 5, 2009, to compete with Zac Atterberry for the team's punting job. However, he was released on April 23, 2009, after the team signed Hunter Smith.

=== Pittsburgh Steelers ===
Johnson was signed by the Pittsburgh Steelers on May 1, 2009. He was released on June 12, 2009.

=== Tampa Bay Buccaneers ===
Johnson was signed by the Tampa Bay Buccaneers on August 13, 2009, after a hip injury to Josh Bidwell. Johnson was placed on injured reserve on November 30, 2009, due to a hamstring injury. He was released on March 4, 2010.

== NFL career statistics ==
Legend
**Bold**	Career high

Year	Team	Punting									
Year	Team	GP	Punts	Yds	Net Yds	Lng	Avg	Net Avg	Blk	Ins20	TB
2002	NOR	1	8	307	278	55	38.4	34.8	0	1	0
2003	PHI	16	**79**	3,207	**2,735**	60	40.6	34.6	0	**27**	10
2004	PHI	16	72	3,032	2,691	62	42.1	37.4	0	20	6
2005	PHI	7	39	1,615	1,496	59	41.4	38.4	0	11	0
2006	PHI	16	78	**3,326**	2,726	60	42.6	34.9	0	21	**11**
2007	CHI	1	4	199	157	60	**49.8**	**39.3**	0	1	1
2008	ARI	12	40	1,670	1,408	59	41.8	35.2	0	13	4
2009	TAM	11	62	2,558	2,276	**63**	41.3	36.7	0	16	3
Career		80	382	15,914	13,767	63	41.7	36.0	0	110	35
