= Sean Considine =

American football player (born 1981)

Seán Considine
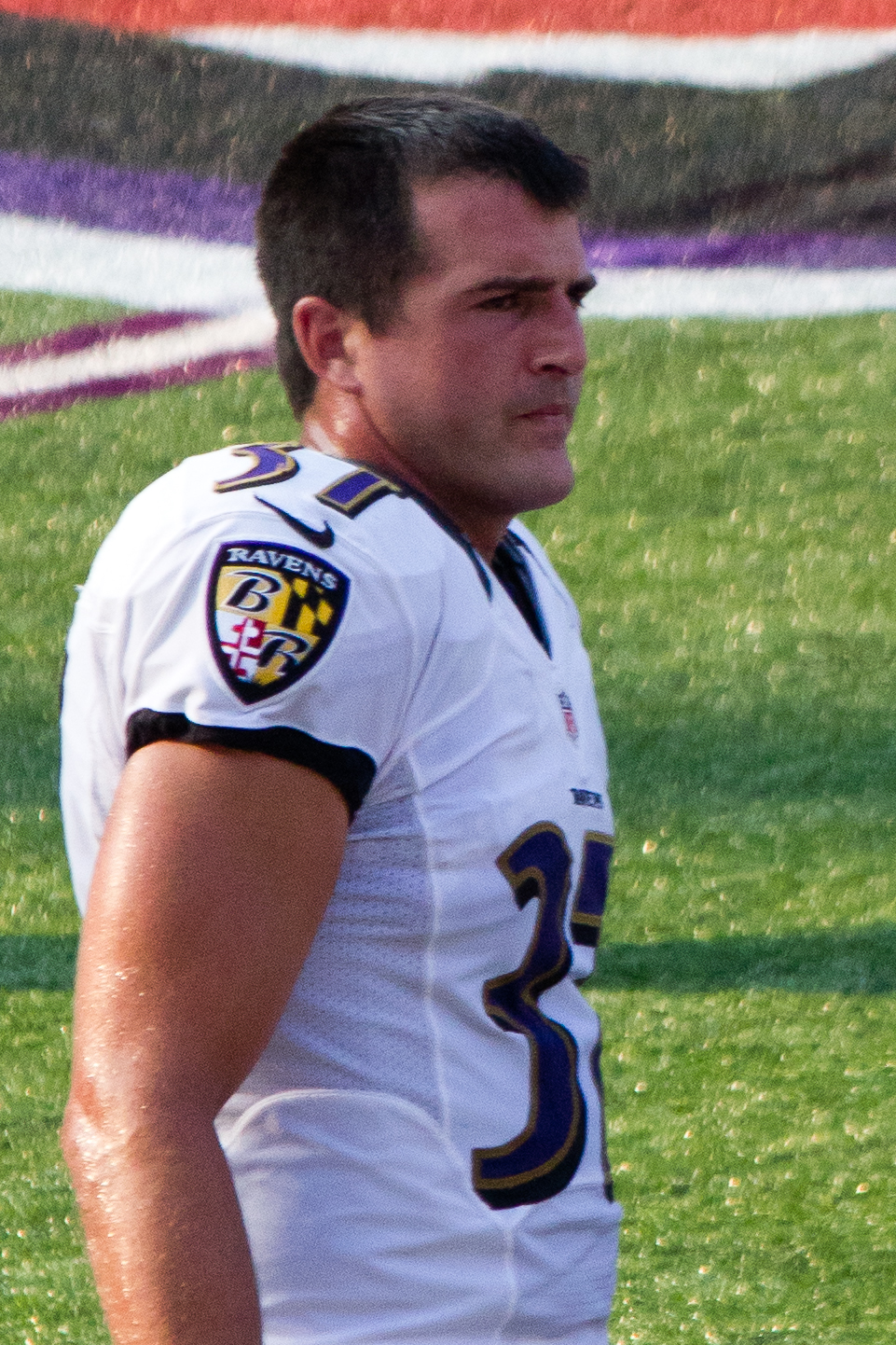
- Considine at Ravens M&T Bank Stadium practice in August 2012

No. 37
- Position: Safety

Personal information
- Born: October 28, 1981 (age 45); Dixon, Illinois, U.S.
- Listed height: 6 ft 0 in (1.83 m)
- Listed weight: 212 lb (96 kg)

Career information
- High school: Byron (IL)
- College: Iowa
- NFL draft: 2005: 4th round, 102nd overall pick

Career history
- Philadelphia Eagles (2005–2008); Jacksonville Jaguars (2009–2010); Carolina Panthers (2011); Arizona Cardinals (2011); Baltimore Ravens (2012)

Awards and highlights
- Super Bowl champion (XLVII)

Career NFL statistics
- Total tackles: 261
- Sacks: 2.5
- Forced fumbles: 2
- Fumble recoveries: 5
- Interceptions: 4
- Stats at Pro Football Reference

Seán Considine (born October 28, 1981) is an American former professional football player who was a safety in the National Football League (NFL). He was selected by the Philadelphia Eagles in the fourth round of the 2005 NFL draft. He played college football for the Iowa Hawkeyes.

Considine also played for the Jacksonville Jaguars, Carolina Panthers, Arizona Cardinals, and Baltimore Ravens.

== Early life ==
Considine played football and basketball for Byron High School in Illinois. He was selected for first team all-state honors twice. Considine also won the 1999 Class 3A state championship his senior year, beating the St. Joseph-Ogden Spartans at Memorial Stadium, 41–8. In the championship game, Considine ran for 189 yards and scored a rushing touchdown. Considine graduated in 2000.

== Professional career ==
=== Philadelphia Eagles ===
Considine was selected by the Philadelphia Eagles with the first pick in the fourth round (102nd overall) of the 2005 NFL draft. He made his NFL debut against the Kansas City Chiefs on October 2, 2005. As a rookie, Considine played in six games, mainly on special teams, before being placed on injured reserve after a dislocated shoulder in the game against the Dallas Cowboys on November 14. He finished the season with eight special teams tackles after being inactive for the first three weeks.

Considine played in all 16 games in 2006, and started the last nine games of the season at strong safety, replacing the previous starter, Michael Lewis. Considine made a career-high 107 tackles (66 solo) and 26 special teams tackles, in addition to 1.5 sacks, one interception, two fumble recoveries and one forced fumble. He started at strong safety in the Eagles' wild card victory against the New York Giants, as well as the divisional playoff game loss against the New Orleans Saints, recording 13 tackles, including five solo, during the playoffs.

The Eagles did not re-sign Michael Lewis, clearing way for Considine to become the unquestioned starter. He started the first eight games in 2007 before he suffered his second season-ending shoulder injury. He still made 47 tackles (31 solo), and one interception during his shortened season, as well as two special teams tackles. While Considine was injured, Quintin Mikell secured the starting strong safety role.

Considine played in all 16 games in 2008 for the second time in four seasons. Primarily a special-teams player, he led the team with 32 special teams tackles. He finished the season with 11 tackles (five solo) on defense, one tackle for a loss. He played in all three of the Eagles' postseason games and finished with three special teams tackles.

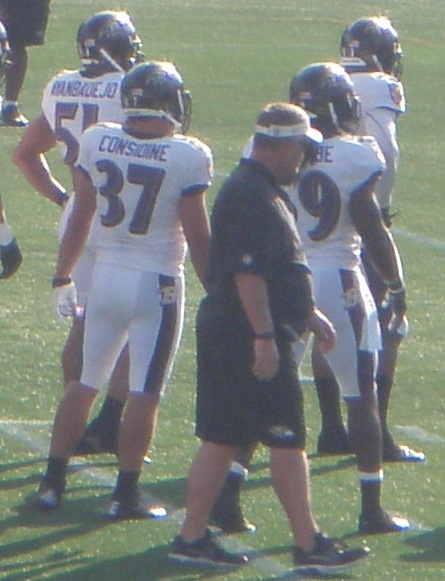
Considine (37) at Navy–Marine Corps Memorial Stadium in 2012.

=== Jacksonville Jaguars ===
Considine became a free agent after the 2008 season and signed with the Jacksonville Jaguars on February 27, 2009. He started at strong safety in the Jaguars' 2009 season-opener against the Indianapolis Colts. He played in 11 games for the Jaguars, making six starts while battling injuries much of the season. Considine played in 14 games in 2010, starting in five, and recorded 52 tackles, one sack, and one interception.

=== Carolina Panthers ===
The Carolina Panthers signed Considine to a one-year contract on July 28, 2011. He was released during final roster cuts on September 5, but was re-signed on September 7. He was released again on October 4 after playing in all four games for the Panthers.

=== Arizona Cardinals ===
The Arizona Cardinals signed Considine on October 11, 2011, following an injury suffered by Kerry Rhodes.

=== Baltimore Ravens ===
On March 23, 2012, Considine signed with the Baltimore Ravens, reuniting with John Harbaugh, who had been his special teams coach with the Eagles. The Ravens had ranked as the second-worst kickoff coverage team and ninth-worst punt coverage team the year prior, and Coach Harbaugh specifically brought in Considine, as well as Corey Graham and James Ihedigbo, to turn that around.

The Ravens greatly improved in their special teams coverage, which helped them advance to Super Bowl XLVII. Considine made a key block in the Super Bowl during Jacoby Jones 108-yard kickoff return for a touchdown. The Ravens won the Super Bowl over the San Francisco 49ers, and Considine retired shortly after.

== NFL career statistics ==
Legend
**Bold**	Career high

=== Regular season ===
Year	Team	Games		Tackles					Interceptions					Fumbles			
Year	Team	GP	GS	Cmb	Solo	Ast	Sck	TFL	Int	Yds	TD	Lng	PD	FF	FR	Yds	TD
2005	PHI	6	0	4	2	2	0.0	0	0	0	0	0	0	0	0	0	0
2006	PHI	**16**	**9**	**86**	**60**	**26**	**1.5**	**2**	**1**	12	0	12	**5**	**1**	**2**	0	0
2007	PHI	8	8	36	27	9	0.0	1	**1**	0	0	0	3	0	0	0	0
2008	PHI	**16**	0	30	23	7	0.0	1	0	0	0	0	0	0	0	0	0
2009	JAX	11	6	35	28	7	0.0	**2**	**1**	**25**	0	**25**	4	0	1	0	0
2010	JAX	14	5	52	43	9	1.0	1	**1**	-2	0	-2	3	**1**	1	0	0
2011	CAR	4	0	0	0	0	0.0	0	0	0	0	0	0	0	1	0	0
2011	ARI	8	0	9	5	4	0.0	0	0	0	0	0	0	0	0	0	0
2012	BAL	**16**	0	9	7	2	0.0	0	0	0	0	0	0	0	0	0	0
		99	28	261	195	66	2.5	7	4	35	0	25	15	2	5	0	0

=== Playoffs ===
Year	Team	Games		Tackles					Interceptions					Fumbles			
Year	Team	GP	GS	Cmb	Solo	Ast	Sck	TFL	Int	Yds	TD	Lng	PD	FF	FR	Yds	TD
2006	PHI	2	**2**	**13**	**7**	**6**	0.0	0	0	0	0	0	0	0	0	0	0
2008	PHI	3	0	2	2	0	0.0	0	0	0	0	0	**1**	0	0	0	0
2012	BAL	**4**	0	4	3	1	0.0	0	0	0	0	0	0	0	0	0	0
		9	2	19	12	7	0.0	0	0	0	0	0	1	0	0	0	0

== Personal life ==
Seán is married to his wife Nicole and they have five children. The couple are observant Catholics.

Considine now operates a mobile meat market business. Additionally, he operates a resale store for contractors. Considine is an avid fisher and hunter. He also serves as an assistant coach at Byron High School, his alma mater.
