= Ryan Moats =

American football player (born 1982)

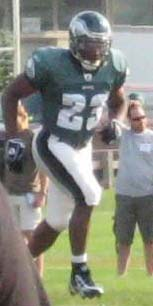
- Moats at Eagles training camp in 2008

No. 21, 23
- Position: Running back

Personal information
- Born: December 17, 1982 (age 43); Dallas, Texas, U.S.
- Listed height: 5 ft 8 in (1.73 m)
- Listed weight: 210 lb (95 kg)

Career information
- High school: Bishop Lynch (Dallas)
- College: Louisiana Tech
- NFL draft: 2005: 3rd round, 77th overall pick

Career history
- Philadelphia Eagles (2005–2007); Arizona Cardinals (2008)*; Houston Texans (2008–2009); Minnesota Vikings (2010)*
- * Offseason or practice squad member only

Awards and highlights
- WAC Offensive Player of the Year (2004)

Career NFL statistics
- Rushing attempts: 204
- Rushing yards: 831
- Rushing touchdowns: 8
- Receptions: 20
- Receiving yards: 127
- Receiving touchdowns: 1
- Stats at Pro Football Reference

Ryan Moats (born December 17, 1982) is an American former professional football player who was a running back in the National Football League (NFL). He played college football for the Louisiana Tech Bulldogs and was selected by the Philadelphia Eagles in the third round of the 2005 NFL draft.

Moats was also a member of the Arizona Cardinals, Houston Texans and Minnesota Vikings. Since the completion of his NFL career, Moats has transferred his skills to rugby union and plays for Griffins Rugby of Allen, Texas.

== Early life ==
Moats attended Bishop Lynch High School in Dallas. While there he was a two sport athlete in both football and track and field. He ran a 10.9 in the 100 meter dash for track. In football, he won All-State (private school) honors, the Dominic Norman Award, given to a player who demonstrates excellent leadership, and the Dave Campbell Texas Player of the Year. He rushed for a school record 4,782 yards, and 56 touchdowns. Moats was also named Offensive MVP of the DFW All-Star game, following his senior season at Bishop Lynch.

In addition to being named the Offensive MVP of the DFW All-Star game, Moats was voted MVP of the 2006 Main Mein's squad and was widely regarded as the steal of the draft.

== College career ==
Moats then played college football at Louisiana Tech University, playing 32 games over three seasons. He was named Western Athletic Conference Offensive Player of the Year in 2004.

== Professional career ==
=== Philadelphia Eagles ===
Moats was drafted by the Philadelphia Eagles in the third round (77th overall) of the 2005 NFL draft. Following injury to starter Brian Westbrook, Moats was given the opportunity play in the latter half of the 2005 season. On December 11 he scored a 40-yard touchdown on his first carry of the game, his first NFL touchdown, and finished with 114 yards on 11 carries in a 26–23 loss to the New York Giants.

Moats saw limited playing time during the 2006 season and missed the entire 2007 season after breaking his ankle during the Eagles' first preseason game.

On August 29, 2008, Moats was waived by the Eagles during final cuts.

=== Arizona Cardinals ===
Moats was signed to the practice squad of the Arizona Cardinals on September 16, 2008. He was released on October 1.

=== Houston Texans ===
Moats was signed to the practice squad of the Houston Texans on October 8, 2008, when the team released practice squad Running back D. D. Terry. Moats was promoted to the active roster on October 25 after the team waived running back Darius Walker. Moats got his first carry of the 2008 season in Week 8 against the Minnesota Vikings. Moats was promoted to second on the depth chart because of an injury to Ahman Green. In week 8 of the 2009 season Moats scored three touchdowns after replacing starting running back Steve Slaton. Moats ended with 126 yards on 23 carries. He was named starting running back for the week's following game at Indianapolis. He was waived on June 10, 2010.

=== Minnesota Vikings ===
Moats was claimed off waivers by the Minnesota Vikings on June 15, 2010. He was waived on August 24.

=== Griffins Rugby Club ===
In the summer of 2013, Moats joined the Griffins Rugby Club in Allen, TX to become one of the first NFL athletes to play the sport. The Griffins, formerly the Frisco Griffins, are a semi-pro team with strong affiliations with English Premiership Rugby.

== March 2009 police stop ==
In early March 2009, Moats's mother-in-law, Jonetta Collinsworth, died from breast cancer. When they were informed that Collinsworth was close to death, Moats, his wife Tamishia (Collinsworth's daughter) and other family members rushed to Baylor Regional Medical Center in Plano, Texas. After driving through a red light, Moats was stopped by Dallas Police Department officer Robert Powell, who delayed him for 13 minutes outside the hospital's emergency room, even after Moats's explanation was corroborated by a hospital nurse. By the time Moats reached Collinsworth, she had died.

When asked if he felt that Powell should be fired, Moats said, "I really don't know. All I know is what he did was wrong. I mean, he stole a moment away from me that I can never get back. I'm really not the judge on what should happen to him. I think maybe his superiors and the Dallas police should handle what should happen to him."

The police chief and Powell issued an apology to the Moats' family and the traffic charge was later dismissed. Police officials investigated Powell's actions; he was placed on administrative leave but later resigned from the department.
