= Thomas Tapeh =

Liberian gridiron football player (born 1980)

No. 41, 38, 44
- Position: Fullback

Personal information
- Born: 28 March 1980 (age 46); Monrovia, Liberia
- Listed height: 6 ft 1 in (1.85 m)
- Listed weight: 243 lb (110 kg)

Career information
- High school: Johnson (Saint Paul, Minnesota, U.S.)
- College: Minnesota (1999–2003)
- NFL draft: 2004: 5th round, 162nd overall pick

Career history
- Philadelphia Eagles (2004–2007); Minnesota Vikings (2008)

Career NFL statistics
- Rushing attempts: 22
- Rushing yards: 69
- Receptions: 27
- Receiving yards: 157
- Receiving touchdowns: 1
- Stats at Pro Football Reference

Thomas Teah Tapeh (pronounced TUH-PEH) (born March 28, 1980) is a Liberian former professional football fullback. He was selected by the Philadelphia Eagles in the fifth round in the 2004 NFL draft. He played college football at Minnesota. Tapeh also played for the Minnesota Vikings.

== Early and personal life ==
Tapeh grew up playing soccer in Liberia before his family moved to the Twin Cities when he was nine years old. He attended Saint Paul Johnson High School. He is the only player to score a touchdown in the Metrodome as a high schooler (in a Johnson-Harding High School game), as a collegiate athlete (for the Gophers), and as a professional athlete in the NFL (as an Eagle).

Tapeh is a devout Christian, with his faith stemming from a Christian woman who stopped his mother from having an abortion. Tapeh is active in his church as a mentor and volunteer, and has spoken publicly about his faith. He is married and has two children.

== Professional career ==
=== Philadelphia Eagles ===
Tapeh was selected by the Eagles in the fifth round of the 2004 NFL draft with the 162nd overall pick. With Jon Ritchie already the starting full back, Tapeh saw playing time as the third string running back. In week 14, Tapeh suffered a hip injury which caused him to miss the rest of 2004 and all of 2005.

Tapeh returned from injury in 2006, and won the starting full back job from Josh Parry in training camp. He played in all 16 regular season games for the Eagles, as well as their two playoff games that season.

In 2007, Tapeh again played full back in all 16 games for the Eagles, despite battling a knee injury. Statistically, Brian Westbrook's best two seasons in rushing yards, receiving yards, yards-per-carry, yards-per-reception and total touchdowns were both seasons Tapeh started at full back.

=== Minnesota Vikings ===
On 29 February 2008 (the first day of free agency), Tapeh signed a five-year contract with the Minnesota Vikings. Vikings head coach Brad Childress, who worked with Tapeh as the offensive coordinator in Philadelphia, envisioned a long-term pairing between Tapeh and NFL Offensive Rookie of the Year Adrian Peterson. However, Tapeh's knee injury from the prior season resurfaced, and he was placed on injured reserve after two games. Though he could have fought to be paid his $1.855 million (~$2.72 million in 2025) signing bonus in full, Tapeh agreed to an injury settlement and was released on 16 October 2008 effectively ending his NFL career.

== Coaching career ==
Tapeh took over as head coach of the Woodrow Wilson High School football team in 2012. Woodrow Wilson High School, whose mascot is the Tiger, is located in Camden, New Jersey.
