= Michael Lewis (safety) =

American football player (born 1980)

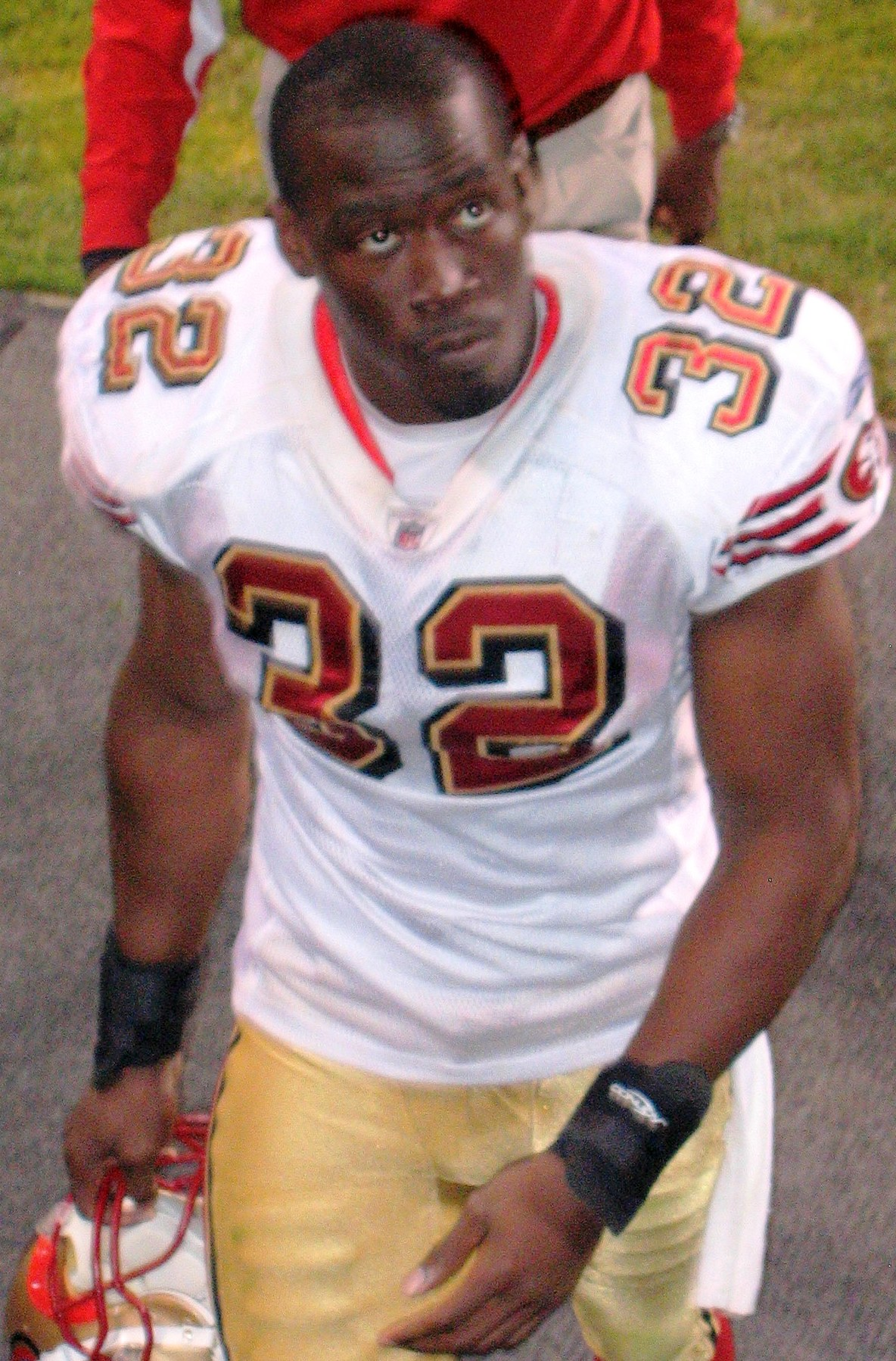
- Lewis with the San Francisco 49ers in 2008

No. 32, 22
- Position: Safety

Personal information
- Born: April 29, 1980 (age 46); Richmond, Texas, U.S.
- Listed height: 6 ft 1 in (1.85 m)
- Listed weight: 222 lb (101 kg)

Career information
- High school: Lamar Consolidated (Rosenberg, Texas)
- College: Colorado
- NFL draft: 2002: 2nd round, 58th overall pick

Career history
- Philadelphia Eagles (2002–2006); San Francisco 49ers (2007–2010); St. Louis Rams (2010)

Awards and highlights
- Pro Bowl (2004); PFWA All-Rookie Team (2002); Third-team All-American (2001)

Career NFL statistics
- Total tackles: 681
- Sacks: 11.5
- Forced fumbles: 14
- Fumble recoveries: 9
- Interceptions: 12
- Defensive touchdowns: 1
- Stats at Pro Football Reference

Michael Milton Lewis (born April 29, 1980) is an American former professional football player who was a strong safety in the National Football League (NFL). He played college football for the Colorado Buffaloes, and was selected by the Philadelphia Eagles in the second round of the 2002 NFL draft. Lewis also played for the San Francisco 49ers and St. Louis Rams. He was a Pro Bowl selection with the Eagles in 2004.

== Amateur career ==
A native of Rosenberg, Texas, Lewis played for Lamar Consolidated High School from 1994 to 1997 before heading to the University of Colorado.

Lewis twice won Colorado's Dave Jones Award for the most outstanding defensive player and the Hale Irwin Award for the most outstanding defensive back in his junior and senior seasons.

As a junior, he made a career-high 117 tackles on his way to first-team All-Big 12 Conference honors.

As a senior, he was a unanimous All-Big 12 Conference first-team choice, earned third-team All-America honors, and was a semi-finalist for the Jim Thorpe Award, given to the nation's top defensive back. He led the team with 112 tackles and five interceptions, one of which he returned for a touchdown.

Lewis closed his career ranked ninth on the school's all-time list with 336 tackles, second in forced fumbles with 10 and tied for 12th with nine interceptions. He also holds the school's career record for sacks by a defensive back with 6.5.

=== Pre-draft ===
Pre-draft measurables
Height	Weight	Arm length	Hand span	40-yard dash	10-yard split	20-yard split	20-yard shuttle	Three-cone drill	Vertical jump	Broad jump	Bench press
6 ft 1 1/8 in (1.86 m)	211 lb (96 kg)	33 1/8 in (0.84 m)	9 in (0.23 m)	4.55 s	1.55 s	2.62 s	4.14 s	6.96 s	36.5 in (0.93 m)	10 ft 2 in (3.10 m)	16 reps
All values from NFL Combine

== Professional career ==
=== Philadelphia Eagles ===
Lewis was drafted 58th overall by the Philadelphia Eagles in the second round of the 2002 NFL draft. As a rookie, he started 4 out of 14 games and recorded 49 tackles, a sack, and an interception. In 2003, he became a full-time starter, replacing Blaine Bishop, and remained the starter alongside free safety Brian Dawkins up to the 2006 season. In 2005, he along with Dawkins were selected as the starters for the 2004 Pro Bowl for the NFC squad. But Lewis had a tough year in 2006. After giving up numerous big plays, he was benched for Sean Considine, starting only 6 of 14 games. He finished his career with the Eagles recording 386 tackles, six sacks, and nine interceptions.

=== San Francisco 49ers ===
On March 2, 2007, Lewis signed with the San Francisco 49ers. Lewis re-gained his starting role with the 49ers and had a good season, finishing his first season with the team starting all 16 games recording 104 tackles, 1.5 sacks, and two interceptions.

On October 1, 2010, it was reported that Lewis would not be traveling with the 49ers to their next game at Atlanta after sitting out that day's practice for "personal reasons". It was further reported that Lewis has asked the team for his release. For the season until that point, Lewis had started each regular season game and had 10 tackles with no interceptions, forced fumbles, or sacks.

On October 4, 2010, Lewis was released by the 49ers and became a free agent.

=== St. Louis Rams ===
Lewis was signed by the St. Louis Rams on October 27, 2010. He was later released at the end of the season and later retired.

== NFL statistics ==
=== Regular season ===
Year	Team	GP	Tackles				Fumbles		Interceptions					
Year	Team	GP	Comb	Solo	Ast	Sack	FF	FR	Int	Yds	Avg	Lng	TD	PD
2002	PHI	14	49	43	6	1.0	4	3	1	0	0.0	0	0	1
2003	PHI	16	85	65	20	2.0	2	1	3	31	10.3	23	0	10
2004	PHI	16	88	74	14	0.0	2	1	1	0	0.0	0	0	12
2005	PHI	16	107	93	14	1.0	1	1	2	13	6.5	13	0	8
2006	PHI	14	57	43	14	2.0	1	0	2	105	52.5	84	1	9
2007	SF	16	104	75	29	1.5	1	1	2	18	9.0	18	0	5
2008	SF	16	96	76	20	2.0	1	1	0	0	0.0	0	0	6
2009	SF	15	82	71	11	1.0	2	1	1	0	0.0	0	0	2
2010	SF	3	10	7	3	0.0	0	0	0	0	0.0	0	0	0
2010	STL	2	3	3	0	1.0	0	0	0	0	0.0	0	0	0
Career		128	681	550	131	11.5	14	9	12	167	13.9	84	1	53

=== Postseason ===
Year	Team	GP	Tackles				Fumbles		Interceptions					
Year	Team	GP	Comb	Solo	Ast	Sack	FF	FR	Int	Yds	Avg	Lng	TD	PD
2002	PHI	2	2	1	1	0.0	0	0	0	0	0.0	0	0	0
2003	PHI	3	12	9	3	0.0	0	0	0	0	0.0	0	0	1
2004	PHI	3	17	14	3	0.0	0	0	0	0	0.0	0	0	4
2006	PHI	2	2	2	0	0.0	0	0	0	0	0.0	0	0	0
Career		9	33	26	7	0.0	0	0	0	0	0.0	0	0	5

== Personal ==
During the week of Super Bowl XXXIX in Jacksonville, Florida Lewis won the annual EA Sports Madden Bowl competition. The tournament featured eight NFL players and Lewis claimed the top spot by defeating Steelers QB Ben Roethlisberger, Colts DE Dwight Freeney (the two-time defending champion), and Bills RB Willis McGahee.

During his sophomore year at Colorado University, Lewis was diagnosed with atrial fibrillation. While not life-threatening, it has contributed to Michael Lewis becoming an active spokesperson for Heart Disease awareness. He has served as a spokesperson for the Philadelphia chapter of the American Heart Association, served as the Honorary Chairperson for Philadelphia Heart Walk, and joined Steve Young in San Jose to promote the American Heart Association's Start! campaign.

Lewis' nephews are former Tampa Bay Buccaneers running back Jacquizz Rodgers and former Atlanta Falcons wide receiver James Rodgers.
