= David Bergeron =

American football player (born 1981)

No. 48
- Position: Linebacker

Personal information
- Born: December 4, 1981 (age 44); Lake Oswego, Oregon, U.S.

Career information
- High school: Lakeridge (Lake Oswego)
- College: Stanford
- NFL draft: 2005: 7thth round, 252nd overall pick

Career history
- Philadelphia Eagles (2005)*; Tennessee Titans (2005)*; Carolina Panthers (2005)*; → Cologne Centurions (2006)
- * Offseason or practice squad member only

David Bergeron (born December 4, 1981) is an American former football linebacker. He played college football at Stanford, and was selected by the Philadelphia Eagles in the seventh round of the 2005 NFL draft.

== Education ==
Bergeron attended Lakeridge High School, after graduating high school he went to college at Stanford University. He finished his career there with two sacks, 176 tackles (16.5 for losses), two forced fumbles, a fumble recovery, an interception, three pass deflections, and a blocked kick.

== Professional career ==
Drafted in 2005, Bergeron was selected by the Philadelphia Eagles in the seventh round (252nd pick).

=== NFL combine results ===
- 40-yard dash: 4.72 seconds
- 20-yard shuttle: 4.23 seconds
- Benchpress: 325 pounds
- Squat: 510 pounds
- Powerclean: 275 pounds
- Vertical jump: 34 inches
