= Keyonta Marshall =

American football player (1981–2019)

No. 65
- Position: Defensive tackle

Personal information
- Born: August 13, 1981; Saginaw, Michigan, U.S.
- Died: March 22, 2019 (aged 37); Ann Arbor, Michigan, U.S.
- Listed height: 6 ft 1 in (1.85 m)
- Listed weight: 325 lb (147 kg)

Career information
- High school: Saginaw
- College: Grand Valley State
- NFL draft: 2005: 7th round, 247th overall pick

Career history
- Philadelphia Eagles (2005); Hamburg Sea Devils (2006); New York Jets (2006–2007)*; Baltimore Ravens (2007)*
- * Offseason or practice squad member only
- Stats at Pro Football Reference

Keyonta D. Marshall (August 13, 1981 – March 22, 2019) was an American professional football defensive lineman who played in the National Football League (NFL). The Philadelphia Eagles selected him out of Grand Valley State University in the seventh round of the 2005 NFL draft with the 247th overall pick. Marshall appeared in one game for the Eagles in 2005, but the team cut him prior to the start of the 2006 season. On November 8, 2006, the New York Jets signed Marshall to their practice squad.
