= Josh Parry =

American football player (born 1978)

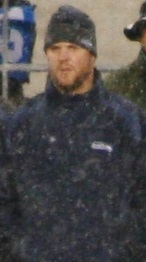
- Parry in 2006

No. 49
- Position: Fullback

Personal information
- Born: April 5, 1978 (age 48); Sonora, California, U.S.
- Listed height: 6 ft 2 in (1.88 m)
- Listed weight: 250 lb (113 kg)

Career information
- High school: Sonora
- College: San Jose State
- NFL draft: 2001: undrafted

Career history
- Philadelphia Eagles (2001)*; Oakland Raiders (2001)*; Frankfurt Galaxy (2002); Philadelphia Eagles (2002−2005); Seattle Seahawks (2006)
- * Offseason or practice squad member only

Career NFL statistics
- Receptions: 23
- Receiving yards: 175
- Stats at Pro Football Reference

Joshua David Parry (born April 5, 1978) is an American former professional football player who was a fullback in the National Football League (NFL). He played college football for the San Jose State Spartans. He was signed by the Philadelphia Eagles as an undrafted free agent in 2001.

Parry was also a member of the Oakland Raiders, Frankfurt Galaxy, and Seattle Seahawks.

== Early life ==
Parry attended Sonora High School in Sonora, California, where he played running back and linebacker in football. He set a school record with 44 rushing touchdowns in his career.

== College career ==
Parry played linebacker at San Jose State, and in his senior season, recorded 122 tackles and two interceptions. His brother, Neil, who played alongside him at safety, suffered a broken leg during his sophomore season, which led to a bacterial infection and the amputation of his foot. Neil later played for the Spartans in 2003 with a prosthetic leg.

== Professional career ==
=== Philadelphia Eagles ===
Parry entered the 2001 NFL draft but went undrafted. He was signed by the Philadelphia Eagles for training camp and made it through the preseason until final cuts. He then spent the 2001 season on the Oakland Raiders' practice squad.

Parry was re-signed by the Eagles to a future contract two days after their loss in the NFC Championship game. They assigned him to the Frankfurt Galaxy of NFL Europe, where he played linebacker and running back. He returned to the Eagles for training camp and the preseason, but following a knee injury during the 2002 preseason finale, Parry was not signed for the 2002 season.

Parry was re-signed to a future contract again on January 30, 2003. He was converted to fullback during mini-camp in 2003. He was waived during final cuts again on August 31, 2003, but was re-signed to the team's practice squad on September 1. He was re-signed to a future contract on February 6, 2004, but was waived during final cuts again on September 1. He was re-signed to the team's practice squad on September 6, but was released on September 22. After the Eagles' starting fullback Jon Ritchie suffered a torn ACL in a game against the Detroit Lions, Parry was re-signed to a three-year contract on September 27 and assumed the starting job with Thomas Tapeh for the rest of the season. Parry beat out Ritchie for the starting job in training camp in 2005, and starting in all 16 games for the Eagles. In 2006, Parry was in competition with Tapeh for the starting fullback job.

=== Seattle Seahawks ===
Parry was traded to the Seattle Seahawks on September 2, 2006, after he lost out to Tapeh, in exchange for the team's seventh round selection in 2008, which turned out to be offensive tackle King Dunlap. Parry played in eight games for the Seahawks before he was placed on injured reserve on November 29 with a foot injury. He did not receive a restricted free agent tender from the Seahawks following the season, and became an unrestricted free agent. He was re-signed to a two-year contract on March 5, 2007, but was waived during final roster cuts on September 1.
