= Mike McMahon (American football) =

American gridiron football player (born 1979)

No. 8, 4
- Position: Quarterback

Personal information
- Born: February 8, 1979 (age 47); Pittsburgh, Pennsylvania, U.S.
- Listed height: 6 ft 2 in (1.88 m)
- Listed weight: 215 lb (98 kg)

Career information
- High school: North Allegheny Senior (Wexford, Pennsylvania)
- College: Rutgers
- NFL draft: 2001: 5th round, 149th overall pick

Career history
- Detroit Lions (2001–2004); Philadelphia Eagles (2005); Minnesota Vikings (2006)*; Toronto Argonauts (2007); Montreal Alouettes (2008); California Redwoods (2009); Virginia Destroyers (2011–2012); Uppsala 86ers (2013)
- * Offseason or practice squad member only

Awards and highlights
- UFL champion (2011)

Career NFL statistics
- Passing attempts: 515
- Passing completions: 229
- Completion percentage: 44.5%
- TD–INT: 15–21
- Passing yards: 2,867
- Passer rating: 55.1
- Rushing yards: 409
- Rushing touchdowns: 7
- Stats at Pro Football Reference

Michael Edward McMahon (born February 8, 1979) is an American former professional football player who was a quarterback for five seasons in the National Football League (NFL), mostly serving in a backup role. He spent one season in the Canadian Football League (CFL), and one season in the United Football League (UFL). After playing college football for the Rutgers Scarlet Knights, he was selected by the Detroit Lions in the fifth round of the 2001 NFL draft.

McMahon played for the Lions for four seasons from 2001 to 2004, and for the Philadelphia Eagles in 2005. McMahon played for the Toronto Argonauts and Montreal Alouettes of the CFL in 2007. He signed with the California Redwoods of the UFL in 2009 and played for the Virginia Destroyers from 2011 to 2012. He last played in Europe for the Uppsala 86ers of the Swedish Superserien in 2013.

== Early life ==
McMahon played at North Allegheny High School in Wexford, Pennsylvania, where he became the starting quarterback during his senior year in 1996. He graduated in 1997. While in high school, he was featured in an NFL Films Presents episode as a potential next premiere quarterback to originate from Western Pennsylvania.

== College career ==
McMahon attended college at Rutgers University. Though he started all four years (1997–2000), he sat out some games during the 1999 and 2000 seasons due to shoulder injuries. He participated in the 2000 Blue–Gray Football Classic and in the 2001 Senior Bowl. He left school as the all-time leader in passing and he was the first Scarlet Knight quarterback to be drafted in the NFL draft.

=== Statistics ===
Season	Team	Games			Passing								Rushing			
Season	Team	GP	GS	Record	Comp	Att	Pct	Yards	Avg	TD	Int	Rate	Att	Yards	Avg	TD
1997	Rutgers	9	5	0−5	104	212	49.1	1,259	5.9	6	12	97.0	49	17	0.4	2
1998	Rutgers	11	11	5−6	143	276	51.8	2,203	8.0	12	16	121.6	62	-67	-1.1	2
1999	Rutgers	5	5	0−5	66	146	45.2	989	6.8	5	7	103.8	35	-8	-0.2	1
2000	Rutgers	10	10	3−7	169	340	49.7	2,157	6.3	18	17	110.5	68	243	3.6	3
Career		35	31	8−23	482	974	49.5	6,608	6.8	41	52	109.7	214	185	0.9	8

== Professional career ==
Pre-draft measurables
Height	Weight	Arm length	Hand span	40-yard dash	10-yard split	20-yard split	20-yard shuttle	Three-cone drill	Vertical jump	Broad jump	Wonderlic
6 ft 2 3/8 in (1.89 m)	207 lb (94 kg)	32 in (0.81 m)	9 3/4 in (0.25 m)	4.57 s	1.61 s	2.66 s	4.12 s	7.12 s	37.5 in (0.95 m)	10 ft 4 in (3.15 m)	27
All values from NFL Combine

=== Detroit Lions ===
McMahon was drafted in the fifth round (149th overall) in the 2001 NFL draft by the Detroit Lions, who had traded their sixth- and seventh-round picks to the New England Patriots to take him. The Patriots used those picks to select tight end Arther Love and kicker Owen Pochman. McMahon began the 2001 season as the third-string quarterback behind starter Charlie Batch and backup Ty Detmer. However, after Batch suffered a season-ending injury during a December 2 game against the Chicago Bears, McMahon was inserted as the starting quarterback and served in that role for the Lions' first victory of the season against the Minnesota Vikings on December 16. He made seven total appearances and started three games for Detroit in his rookie campaign.

The Lions drafted University of Oregon quarterback Joey Harrington with the third overall pick in the 2002 NFL draft, but McMahon was named the starting quarterback to begin the 2002 season. After two straight losses as the starter, McMahon was benched in favor of Harrington before the third game of the season. McMahon took over in the last three games of the season due to Harrington having an irregular heartbeat. McMahon began the 2003 season as the backup to Harrington, and only saw action in two games during the season. The Lions re-signed McMahon to a one-year contract on April 1, 2004. In 2004, he was again the backup to Harrington, and played in one game to replace him.

=== Philadelphia Eagles ===
McMahon signed a two-year contract with the Philadelphia Eagles on March 12, 2005, reuniting him with former Lions' head coach Marty Mornhinweg, who was now working as the Eagles' assistant head coach.

McMahon started the 2005 season as the third-string quarterback behind starter Donovan McNabb and backup Koy Detmer. With McNabb undergoing season-ending sports hernia surgery following a November 14 game against the Dallas Cowboys, McMahon took over the reins of the Eagles for the remainder of the season. On December 24, 2005, he became the first Eagles quarterback to rush for two touchdowns in a single game since Randall Cunningham in 1992. After taking over for McNabb, McMahon compiled a record of two wins and five losses in the games he started. His quarterback rating was 55.2 for the season. He was released on March 20, 2006, three days after the team signed quarterback Jeff Garcia.

=== Minnesota Vikings ===
McMahon was signed to a two-year contract by the Minnesota Vikings on March 23, 2006, a move which reunited him with then-Vikings head coach Brad Childress, who was previously the offensive coordinator in Philadelphia. McMahon lost a training camp battle for the third-string job with fellow quarterbacks Tarvaris Jackson and Brooks Bollinger. He was cut on September 2, 2006, after posting a 23.7 passer rating in the preseason, the second worst rating in the league. He was worked out by the Cleveland Browns a few days later but not signed.

=== Canadian Football League ===
On February 20, 2007, McMahon signed with the Toronto Argonauts of the Canadian Football League. McMahon started the 2007 CFL season as the third-string quarterback despite a strong showing in the preseason. However, an injury to Michael Bishop bumped McMahon to starting quarterback. His stint as a starter lasted only two games before being replaced by Damon Allen as the acting starting quarterback for the team.

On September 9, 2008, McMahon was traded to the Montreal Alouettes. In return, the Argonauts received a sixth round draft pick in the 2008 CFL draft (used to select WR Tyler Scott). McMahon was cut on October 15 without having appeared in a game.

=== UFL and Europe ===
McMahon signed with the California Redwoods of the United Football League in 2009, and played for the Virginia Destroyers from 2011 to 2012.

On March 28, 2013, McMahon signed with the Swedish team Uppsala 86ers of the Superserien.

On June 1, 2013, in the season opener against the Carlstad Crusaders, McMahon sustained injuries to several ligaments of the knee and was later ruled out for the season having taken only two snaps for his new team.

== Career statistics ==
Legend
	Led the league
	League champions
**Bold**	Career high

=== Regular season ===
Year	Team	Games			Passing									Rushing				
Year	Team	GP	GS	Record	Cmp	Att	Pct	Yds	Y/A	Lng	TD	Int	Rtg	Att	Yds	Y/A	Lng	TD
2001	DET	8	3	1–2	53	115	46.1	671	5.8	69	3	1	69.9	27	145	5.4	22	1
2002	DET	8	4	0–4	62	147	42.2	874	5.9	49	7	9	52.4	14	96	6.9	22	3
2003	DET	3	0	—	9	31	29.0	87	2.8	26	0	2	12.7	5	32	6.4	12	0
2004	DET	1	0	—	11	15	73.3	77	5.1	19	0	1	56.8	2	18	9.0	14	0
2005	PHI	9	7	2–5	94	207	45.4	1,158	5.6	48	5	4	55.2	34	118	3.5	19	3
Career		29	14	3−11	229	515	44.5	2,867	5.6	69	15	21	55.1	82	409	5.0	22	7

=== Regular season ===
Year	Team	Games			Passing									Rushing				
Year	Team	GP	GS	Record	Cmp	Att	Pct	Yds	Y/A	Lng	TD	Int	Rtg	Att	Yds	Y/A	Lng	TD
2007	TOR	10	2	0–2	15	38	39.5	177	4.7	32	1	3	30.3	5	37	7.4	11	0
Career		10	2	0−2	15	38	39.5	177	4.7	32	1	3	30.3	5	37	7.4	11	0

=== Regular season ===
Year	Team	League	Games			Passing								Rushing			
Year	Team	League	GP	GS	Record	Cmp	Att	Pct	Yds	Y/A	TD	Int	Rtg	Att	Yds	Avg	TD
2009	CAL	UFL	4	2	1–1	21	46	45.7	205	4.5	1	4	29.7	5	22	4.4	0
2011	VA	UFL	2	0	—	14	22	63.6	117	8.0	1	1	84.8	3	10	3.3	0
2012	VA	UFL	1	0	—	8	20	40.0	108	5.4	0	1	37.1	1	4	4.0	1
Career			7	2	1–1	43	88	48.9	490	5.6	2	6	45.2	9	36	4.0	1
