= Matt Ware =

American football player (born 1982)

No. 21, 22, 17
- Position: Safety

Personal information
- Born: December 2, 1982 (age 43); Santa Monica, California, U.S.
- Listed height: 6 ft 3 in (1.91 m)
- Listed weight: 218 lb (99 kg)

Career information
- High school: Loyola (Los Angeles, California)
- College: UCLA
- NFL draft: 2004: 3rd round, 89th overall pick

Career history
- Philadelphia Eagles (2004–2005); Arizona Cardinals (2006–2010); Virginia Destroyers (2012); Toronto Argonauts (2014)

Career NFL statistics
- Total tackles: 113
- Forced fumbles: 3
- Fumble recoveries: 3
- Pass deflections: 7
- Interceptions: 1
- Total touchdowns: 1
- Stats at Pro Football Reference
- Stats at CFL.ca (archive)

Matthew Jesse Ware (born December 2, 1982) is an American former professional football player who was a safety in the National Football League (NFL). He was selected in the third round with the 89th pick in the 2004 NFL draft by the Philadelphia Eagles. He played college football for the UCLA Bruins.

He also played in the NFL for the Arizona Cardinals, along with stints in the United Football League (URL) with the Virginia Destroyers and in the Canadian Football League (CFL) for the Toronto Argonauts.

== Baseball career ==
Ware was selected by the Seattle Mariners in the 21st round of the 2001 MLB draft. He played for the Peoria Mariners during the 2001 and 2002 seasons.

== Football career ==
=== Philadelphia Eagles ===
Ware was drafted by the Philadelphia Eagles in the 2004 NFL draft. In 2005, he recorded a game-winning touchdown against the San Diego Chargers when he recovered the ball after a blocked Chargers field goal and carried it to the end zone. He was released on September 2, 2006.

=== Arizona Cardinals ===
On September 3, 2006, Ware was claimed off waivers by the Arizona Cardinals. On December 16, 2009, he was placed on injured reserve due to a knee injury.

Ware was released by Arizona on September 2, 2011.

=== Toronto Argonauts ===
Ware spent two years away from football, working as a personal trainer and fire fighter, before signing with the Toronto Argonauts of the CFL.
