= Brian Westbrook =

American football player (born 1979)

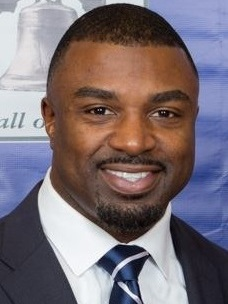
- Westbrook in 2018

No. 36, 20
- Position: Running back

Personal information
- Born: September 2, 1979 (age 47); Fort Washington, Maryland, U.S.
- Listed height: 5 ft 10 in (1.78 m)
- Listed weight: 203 lb (92 kg)

Career information
- High school: DeMatha Catholic (Hyattsville, Maryland)
- College: Villanova (1997–2001)
- NFL draft: 2002: 3rd round, 91st overall pick

Career history
- Philadelphia Eagles (2002–2009); San Francisco 49ers (2010)

Awards and highlights
- First-team All-Pro (2007); 2× Pro Bowl (2004, 2007); Philadelphia Eagles Hall of Fame; Philadelphia Eagles 75th Anniversary Team; Walter Payton Award (2001); 3× First-team I-AA All-American (1998, 2000, 2001); 2× A-10 Offensive Player of the Year (2000, 2001); 3× First-team All-A-10 (1998, 2000, 2001)

Career NFL statistics
- Rushing attempts: 1,385
- Rushing yards: 6,335
- Rushing touchdowns: 41
- Receptions: 442
- Receiving yards: 3,941
- Receiving touchdowns: 30
- Stats at Pro Football Reference
- College Football Hall of Fame

Brian Collins Westbrook (born September 2, 1979) is an American former professional football player who was a running back for nine seasons in the National Football League (NFL). He was selected by the Philadelphia Eagles in the third round of the 2002 NFL draft after playing college football for the Villanova Wildcats. Following an eight-year career with the Eagles, in which he earned two Pro Bowl selections in 2004 and 2007, Westbrook signed with the San Francisco 49ers, for whom he played in 2010.

Westbrook served as the director of player engagement for the XFL until its merger with the United States Football League (USFL), to form the United Football League (UFL) in 2024.

== Early life ==
Westbrook attended DeMatha Catholic High School in Hyattsville, Maryland and was an excellent student and a letterman in football and basketball. In football, as a senior, he was a first-team All-League selection, a first-team All-Prince George's County selection, and an All-State Honorable Mention selection. As a junior, he was a first-team All-Washington Catholic Athletic Conference selection and an All-State Honorable Mention selection.

== College career ==
Westbrook played for the Villanova Wildcats football team while attending Villanova University from 1997 to 2001. Though he battled through several injuries, he holds the all-time National Collegiate Athletic Association (NCAA) record with 9,512 all-purpose yards, breaking the 9,301 yards accumulated by Brian Shay of the Emporia State Hornets. In 46 career games, he scored 542 points with 84 touchdowns, carried the ball 725 times for 4,298 yards (6.2 average), caught 219 passes for 2,582 yards (11.79 average) and gained 2,289 yards and four touchdowns on kickoff returns. Along the way, he established 41 school, 13 Atlantic 10 Conference, and five NCAA records.

Westbrook became the only player in I-AA history to score 160 or more points in two different seasons and the first player in the history of college football at any level with 1,000 rushing and 1,000 receiving yards in one season (1998). He is one of only three players in Villanova history to rush for over 1,000 yards in a season and he accomplished that feat three times.

Westbrook was a consensus I-AA All-America and two-time Atlantic 10 offensive player of the year and was the 2001 recipient of the Walter Payton Award (as the top player in NCAA Division I-AA). As a senior, he amassed 2,823 combined net yards and scored 29 touchdowns.

Westbrook was inducted to the Villanova University Varsity Club Hall of Fame in 2016.

Westbrook was inducted to the College Football Hall of Fame in 2023. He was also inducted into the Senior Bowl Hall of Fame on June 25 of that same year.

== Professional career ==
Despite his dominance in college, NFL teams were hesitant to draft him in the 2002 NFL draft for three reasons: his small size (he was listed at only 5'8", 200 lb (91 kg)), his injury history (he missed an entire college season with a knee injury), and the fact that he did not play college football for an NCAA Division I-A school. Philadelphia Eagles head coach Andy Reid liked what he had seen from Westbrook and drafted him in the third round with the 91st overall pick.

Pre-draft measurables
Height	Weight	Arm length	Hand span	40-yard dash	10-yard split	20-yard split	Three-cone drill	Vertical jump	Broad jump	Bench press	Wonderlic
5 ft 8 3/8 in (1.74 m)	200 lb (91 kg)	29 1/2 in (0.75 m)	10 1/8 in (0.26 m)	4.58 s	1.58 s	2.63 s	7.09 s	37 in (0.94 m)	9 ft 10 in (3.00 m)	26 reps	31
All values from NFL Combine

=== Philadelphia Eagles ===
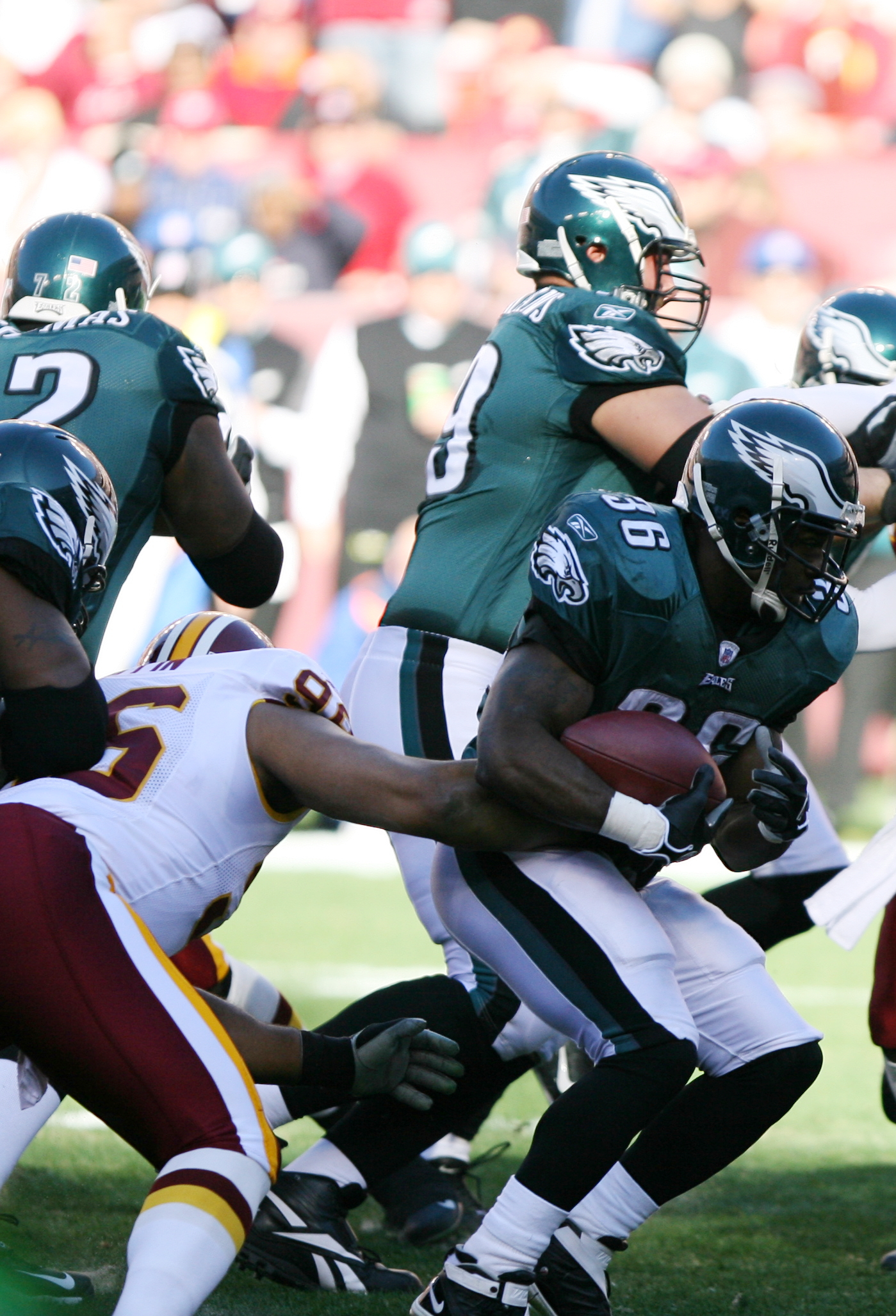
Westbrook with the ball in a game against the Redskins in 2006

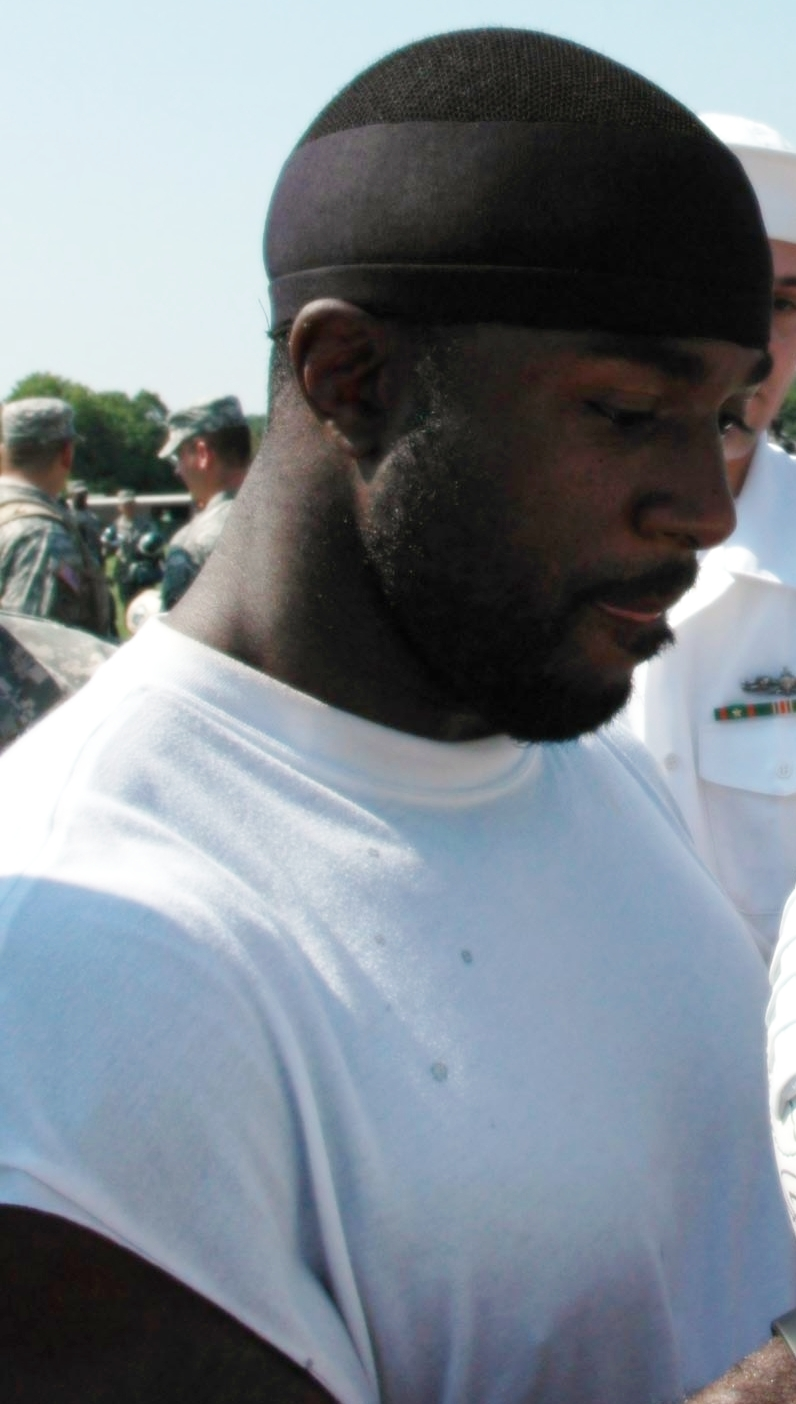
Westbrook in 2008

Westbrook saw limited time in the 2002 season, but he threw a touchdown pass to wide receiver Todd Pinkston on a trick play in a September 2002 rout of the Dallas Cowboys. He made his historical mark in the NFL in the 2003 season with a fourth quarter punt return for a touchdown to defeat the New York Giants 14–10 in the closing minutes on October 19, 2003. The play managed to turn the Eagles' season around as they went to the NFC Championship Game. Westbrook, who scored 11 touchdowns by ground and air, missed the playoffs that year after tearing a triceps muscle in the final game of the season against the Washington Redskins.

After the departure of previous starter Duce Staley and a pre-season injury to Correll Buckhalter, Westbrook became the starting running back for 2004. He rushed for a career-high 812 yards, led all NFL running backs in receiving with 73 receptions for 703 yards, and scored nine touchdowns, creating numerous problems with opposing teams' defenses and helping to propel the Eagles to a 13–3 season. In the playoffs, Westbrook had 117 yards from scrimmage and a touchdown in a 27–14 win against the Vikings, and 135 yards from scrimmage in the NFC Championship win against the Falcons.

Westbrook and the Eagles would go on to play in the city's first Super Bowl in 25 years. He would have a solid performance in Philadelphia's Super Bowl loss to the New England Patriots, rushing for 44 yards, catching seven passes for 60 yards, and scoring one touchdown. He also played in his first Pro Bowl the following week.

Westbrook signed a five-year contract extension with the Eagles in November 2005, after holding out of training camp and months of hectic negotiations. On December 6, 2005, with over 1,200 total yards rushing and receiving, it was announced that Westbrook would miss the rest of the 2005 season due to a mid-foot injury he sustained during a 42–0 Monday night loss to the Seattle Seahawks. During the 2005 season, numerous Eagles starters battled injuries throughout the entire year, and the team finished 6-10 just one year removed from their Super Bowl berth.

Westbrook resumed his productivity in 2006, despite early injury concerns over a swollen knee. With a season-ending injury to McNabb on November 19, 2006, Westbrook stepped up and became the keystone of the Philadelphia offense. On November 26, 2006, he became the first Eagle to rush for over 100 yards in three straight games since Wilbert Montgomery did it 25 years earlier.

Westbrook set a career-high in rushing yards with 1,217, topping 1,000 yards for the first time in his career. He also led the team with 77 receptions for 699 receiving yards. His 11 total touchdowns (seven rushing and four receiving) were also tops on the Eagles. On January 7, 2007, Westbrook set a career-postseason rushing record, rushing for 141 yards on 20 carries against the New York Giants, including a 49-yard touchdown. The following week against the New Orleans Saints, Westbrook nearly willed the team to another playoff victory, scoring two touchdowns in the game.

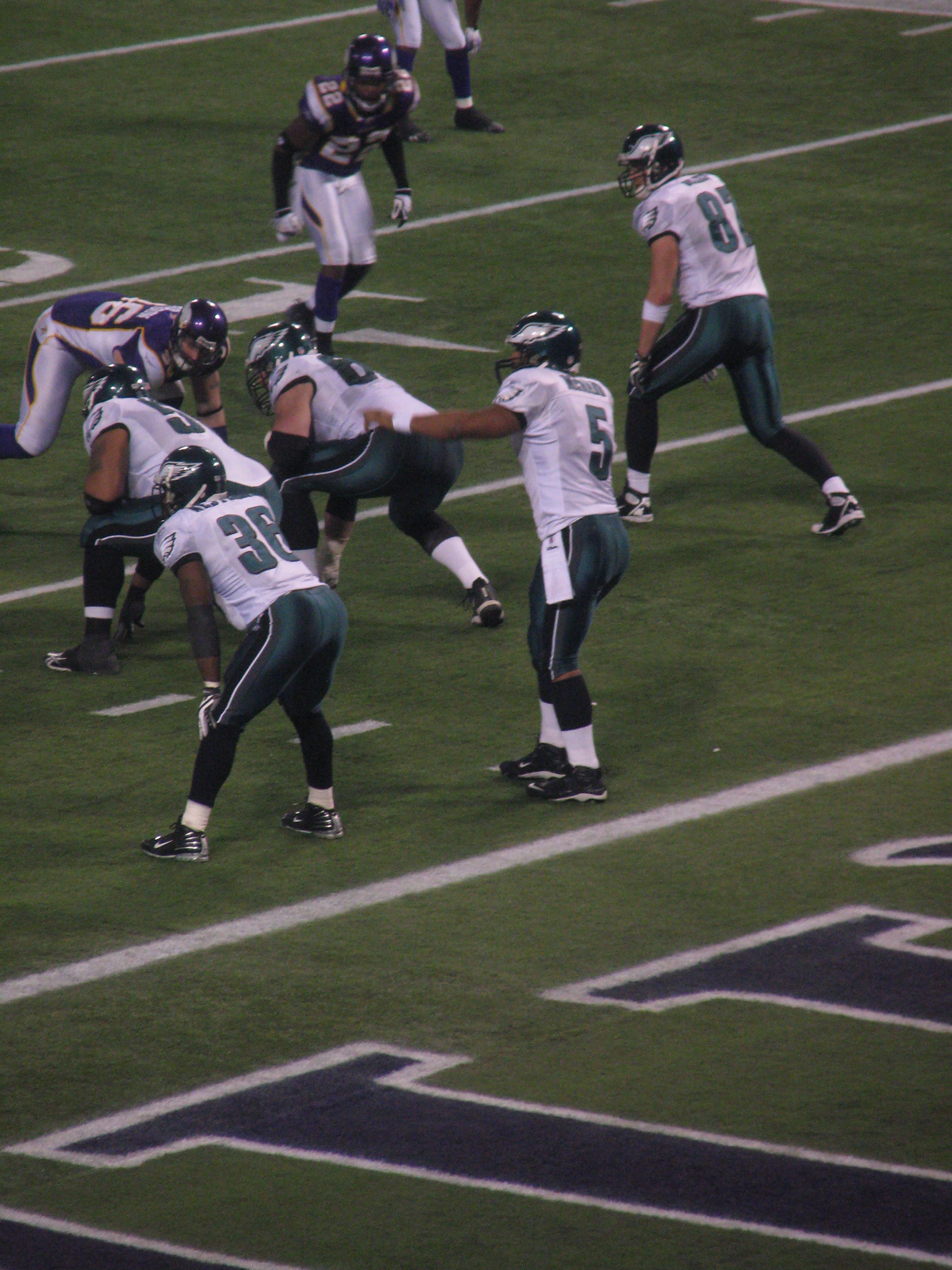
Westbrook (left) and Donovan McNabb (right) in 2009 NFC Wild Card game

After his strong playoff performance, Westbrook picked up right where he left in 2007 and cemented himself as one of the top backs in the league. He had over 100 yards rushing and receiving combined in 12 of the 15 games that he played. His 1,333 rushing yards were a new career high and his 2,104 yards from scrimmage led the NFL. Westbrook was named to his second Pro Bowl and first All-Pro team, after setting a new single-season franchise record with 90 receptions.

On August 8, 2008, Westbrook signed a five-year, $32 million extension with the Eagles, with the possibility of earning another $3 million after the first three seasons if incentives are met. On September 15, 2008, in a Monday night loss to the Dallas Cowboys, Westbrook caught one touchdown and rushed for two more, making him only the seventh player in NFL history to rush for 30 and catch 25 touchdowns in his career. On October 26, 2008, coming off a rib and ankle injury, Westbrook did not show any rust whatsoever against Atlanta Falcons on Sunday in his first action since Week 5, recording a career-high 167 yards and two touchdowns off 22 carries and adding 42 yards off six receptions. Then in week 13, he scored two receiving and two rushing touchdowns with 100+ yards, the first time since 1975.

Westbrook entered the 2009 season finally recovered from the injuries he sustained in 2008, but would see only seven starts during season, due to additional injuries suffered. In week 7, Westbrook suffered a concussion and would not return until week 10, when he would suffer yet another concussion and be forced to miss the majority of the remainder of the season, being played sparingly in the consecutive losses to Dallas in the season finale and wild-card round.

Westbrook was released by the Eagles on March 5, 2010.

=== San Francisco 49ers ===
Westbrook signed a one-year contract with the San Francisco 49ers including $1.25 million guaranteed on August 16, 2010. The 49ers' decision to sign Westbrook came after the sudden retirement of second year backup running back Glen Coffee. On November 29, 2010, during the Monday Night Football game versus the Arizona Cardinals, starting halfback Frank Gore fractured his hip, ending his season. Filling in for the injured Gore, Westbrook carried the ball 23 times for 136 yards and 1 touchdown. Westbrook finished the 2010 season with 77 rushes for 340 yards for a 4.4 average and 4 touchdowns, plus 16 catches for 150 yards and another score, having played in 14 games, starting 5 of them.

=== Retirement ===
On August 28, 2012, it was announced that Westbrook would retire as a member of the Philadelphia Eagles; his retirement was made official the next day at a live press conference. Westbrook was subsequently honored by the Eagles at halftime of their game against the Washington Redskins on December 23, 2012; the team also named him as honorary captain for the game. Westbrook began the 2013 season as a panel member on Eagles Post Game Live on the Comcast Sportsnet Network, along with Michael Barkann, Ed Rendell, and Ray Didinger.

On October 19, 2015, Westbrook was inducted to the Eagles Hall of Fame during Monday Night Football versus the New York Giants.

== NFL career statistics ==
Legend
	Led the league
**Bold**	Career high

=== Regular season ===
Year	Team	Games		Rushing					Receiving							Fumbles	
Year	Team	GP	GS	Att	Yards	Avg	Lng	TD	Tgt	Rec	Yds	Avg	Lng	TD	FD	Fum	Lost
2002	PHI	**15**	3	46	193	4.2	18	0	13	9	86	9.6	20	0	4	2	**2**
2003	PHI	**15**	8	117	613	**5.2**	62	7	48	37	332	9.0	38	4	17	**3**	**2**
2004	PHI	13	12	177	812	4.6	50	3	87	73	703	9.6	50	**6**	30	1	1
2005	PHI	12	12	156	617	4.0	31	3	96	61	616	**10.1**	**62**	4	27	0	0
2006	PHI	**15**	14	240	1,217	5.1	**71**	7	105	77	699	9.1	52	4	30	2	**2**
2007	PHI	**15**	**15**	**278**	**1,333**	4.8	36	7	**118**	**90**	**771**	8.6	57	5	**32**	2	**2**
2008	PHI	14	14	233	936	4.0	39	**9**	74	54	402	7.4	47	5	19	2	1
2009	PHI	8	7	61	274	4.5	25	1	34	25	181	7.2	34	1	8	0	0
2010	SF	14	5	77	340	4.4	30	4	24	16	150	9.4	62	1	5	0	0
Career		121	90	1,385	6,335	4.6	71	41	599	442	3,940	8.9	62	30	172	12	10

=== Postseason ===
Year	Team	Games		Rushing					Receiving							Fumbles	
Year	Team	GP	GS	Att	Yards	Avg	Lng	TD	Tgt	Rec	Yds	Avg	Lng	TD	FD	Fum	Lost
2002	PHI	2	1	3	5	1.7	3	0	8	3	25	8.3	13	0	1	0	0
2004	PHI	**3**	**3**	43	210	4.9	36	0	**26**	**17**	**146**	8.6	24	**2**	8	**1**	0
2006	PHI	2	2	33	**257**	**7.8**	**62**	**3**	10	5	17	3.4	6	0	1	**1**	**1**
2008	PHI	**3**	**3**	**50**	119	2.4	14	0	15	7	119	17.0	**71**	1	5	**1**	**1**
2009	PHI	1	0	0	0	0.0	0	0	2	1	27	**27.0**	27	0	1	0	0
Career		11	9	129	591	4.6	62	3	61	33	334	10.1	71	3	16	3	2

== Personal life ==
Westbrook has a younger brother, Byron Westbrook, who played defensive back at Salisbury University in Maryland and signed as an undrafted free agent with the Washington Redskins in 2007. Their cousin, Lawrence Westbrook, played basketball at the University of Minnesota. His second cousin, Jamire Westbrook plays for the Miami University in Ohio football team as a running back. Although it has been reported in various media biographies that Westbrook is the cousin of NBA player Russell Westbrook of the Los Angeles Lakers, this is not the case. A July 2008 Daily Oklahoman article reported that Russell Westbrook said the two are not cousins. On March 16, 2013, it was reported that Westbrook was experiencing memory loss. Brian is currently a correspondent for CSN Philly.
