= 2005 New York Jets season =

2005 season of NFL team New York Jets

- Owner: Woody & Christopher Johnson
- Head coach: Herman Edwards
- Home stadium: Giants Stadium

Results
- Record: 4–12
- Division place: 4th AFC East
- Playoffs: Did not qualify
- Pro Bowlers: CB Ty Law; ILB Jonathan Vilma

Uniform
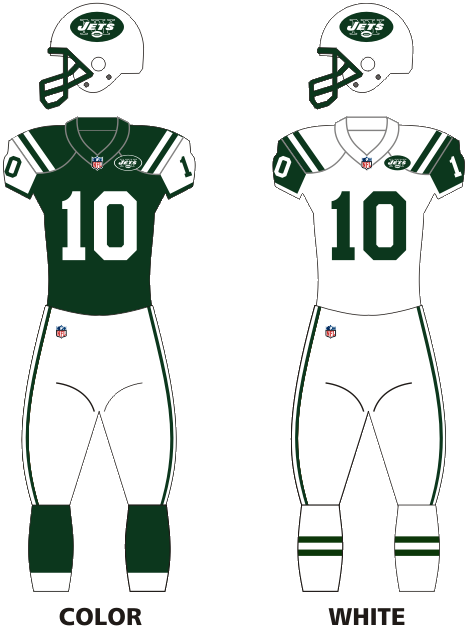

The 2005 New York Jets season was the franchise's 36th season in the National Football League (NFL), the 46th season overall, and the fifth and final under head coach Herman Edwards. The Jets were attempting to improve upon their 10–6 record from 2004 but failed and finished the season with a 4–12 record (Their lowest wins since their 1–15 season in 1996) and missed the playoffs.

The Jets went 0–8 on the road for the first time in franchise history.

== Offseason ==
=== NFL draft ===
2005 New York Jets draft
Round	Pick	Player	Position	College	Notes
2	47	Mike Nugent	K	Ohio State	from Houston via Oakland
2	57	Justin Miller *	CB	Clemson	
3	88	Sione Pouha	DT	Utah	
4	123	Kerry Rhodes	S	Louisville	from Jacksonville
5	161	Andre Maddox	SS	NC State	
6	182	Cedric Houston	RB	Tennessee	from Arizona via Oakland
6	198	Joel Dreessen	TE	Colorado State	
7	240	Harry Williams	WR	Tuskegee	
Made roster * Made at least one Pro Bowl during career

== Staff ==
2005 New York Jets staff
Front office: Owner – Woody Johnson; Manager of football administration – Dawn Aponte; Head coaches: Head coach – Herman Edwards; Assistant head coach/special teams coordinator – Mike Westhoff; Offensive coaches: Offensive coordinator – Mike Heimerdinger; Quarterbacks – Jeremy Bates; Tight ends – John Zernhelt; Offensive line – Doug Marrone; Assistant offensive line – Dave Szott; Offensive assistant/quarterbacks – Pep Hamilton; Offensive assistant/quality control – Tim Berbenich	Defensive coaches: Defensive coordinator – Donnie Henderson; Defensive line coach – Denny Marcin; Linebackers – Bob Sutton; Defensive backs – Corwin Brown; Defensive assistant – Jay Mandolesi; Special teams coaches: Assistant special teams/assistant running backs – Sam Gash; Strength and conditioning: Director of physical development – Markus Paul; Strength assistant – Sal Alosi; Offseason speed consultant – Brett Bech

== Roster ==
2005 New York Jets roster
Quarterbacks (QB): 5 Brooks Bollinger; 3 Kliff Kingsbury; 16 Vinny Testaverde; Running backs (RB): 35 B. J. Askew FB; 23 Derrick Blaylock; 34 Cedric Houston; 33 Jerald Sowell FB; Wide receivers (WR): 87 Laveranues Coles; 89 Jerricho Cotchery; 81 Justin McCareins; 84 Dante Ridgeway; 18 Harry Williams; Tight ends (TE): 83 Joel Dreessen; 88 Doug Jolley	Offensive linemen (OL): 78 Jonathan Goodwin G; 75 Scott Gragg OT; 79 Adrian Jones OT; 64 Norm Katnik C; 66 Pete Kendall C; 65 Brandon Moore G; 76 Steve Morley G/OT; 67 Doug Nienhuis G; 72 Isaac Snell G; Defensive linemen (DL): 56 John Abraham DE; 96 Dave Ball DE; 92 Shaun Ellis DE; 97 Trevor Johnson DE; 70 Lance Legree DT; 95 Matt McChesney DT; 91 Sione Po'uha DT; 93 James Reed DT; 63 Dewayne Robertson DT; 99 Bryan Thomas DE	Linebackers (LB): 55 Mark Brown OLB; 98 Jamar Enzor OLB; 53 Barry Gardner OLB; 54 Victor Hobson OLB; 58 Ryan Myers OLB; 51 Jonathan Vilma MLB; 52 Kenyatta Wright MLB; Defensive backs (DB): 36 David Barrett CB; 45 Oliver Celestin FS; 26 Erik Coleman SS; 32 Darrien Johnson CB; 24 Ty Law CB; 22 Justin Miller CB; 25 Kerry Rhodes FS; 21 Derrick Strait CB; 42 Rashad Washington SS; Special teams (ST): 85 James Dearth LS; 7 Ben Graham P; 1 Mike Nugent K	Practice squad: 27 Terry Butler RB; 82 Reggie Harrell WR; 61 Michael King G; 49 Corey Lamkin TE; 44 Luke Lawton FB; 31 Jeremy LeSueur CB; 11 Jovan Witherspoon WR; Reserve: 86 Chris Baker TE (IR); 50 Eric Barton ILB (IR); 77 Marko Cavka OT (IR); 80 Wayne Chrebet WR (IR); -- Mondoe Davis ILB (IR); 69 Jason Fabini OT (IR); 9 Jay Fiedler QB (IR); 41 Andre Maddox S (IR); 28 Curtis Martin RB (IR); 68 Kevin Mawae C (IR); 57 Darrell McClover ILB (IR); 10 Chad Pennington QB (IR); Rookies in italics 52 active, 12 reserve, 7 practice squad

== Preseason ==
Week	Date	Opponent	Result	Record	Venue	Recap
1	August 12	Detroit Lions	W 10–3	1–0	Giants Stadium	Recap
2	August 19	Minnesota Vikings	W 28–21	1–0	Giants Stadium	Recap
3	August 26	at New York Giants	L 14–15	2–1	Giants Stadium	Recap
4	September 1	at Philadelphia Eagles	W 37–14	3–1	Lincoln Financial Field	Recap

== Regular season ==
In addition to their regular games with AFC East rivals, the Jets played teams from the AFC West and NFC South as per the schedule rotation, and also played intraconference games against the Ravens and the Jaguars based on divisional positions from 2004.

=== Schedule ===
Week	Date	Opponent	Result	Record	Venue	Recap
1	September 11	at Kansas City Chiefs	**L** 7–27	0–1	Arrowhead Stadium	Recap
2	September 18	**Miami Dolphins**	**W** 17–7	1–1	Giants Stadium	Recap
3	September 25	Jacksonville Jaguars	**L** 20–26 (OT)	1–2	Giants Stadium	Recap
4	October 2	at Baltimore Ravens	**L** 3–13	1–3	M&T Bank Stadium	Recap
5	October 9	Tampa Bay Buccaneers	**W** 14–12	2–3	Giants Stadium	Recap
6	October 16	at **Buffalo Bills**	**L** 17–27	2–4	Ralph Wilson Stadium	Recap
7	October 24	at Atlanta Falcons	**L** 14–27	2–5	Georgia Dome	Recap
8	Bye					
9	November 6	San Diego Chargers	**L** 26–31	2–6	Giants Stadium	Recap
10	November 13	at Carolina Panthers	**L** 3–30	2–7	Bank of America Stadium	Recap
11	November 20	at Denver Broncos	**L** 0–27	2–8	Invesco Field at Mile High	Recap
12	November 27	New Orleans Saints	**L** 19–21	2–9	Giants Stadium	Recap
13	December 4	at **New England Patriots**	**L** 3–16	2–10	Gillette Stadium	Recap
14	December 11	Oakland Raiders	**W** 26–10	3–10	Giants Stadium	Recap
15	December 18	at **Miami Dolphins**	**L** 20–24	3–11	Dolphins Stadium	Recap
16	December 26	**New England Patriots**	**L** 21–31	3–12	Giants Stadium	Recap
17	January 1	**Buffalo Bills**	**W** 30–26	4–12	Giants Stadium	Recap

Note: Intra-division opponents are in bold text.

=== Standings ===
AFC East
	W	L	T	PCT	DIV	CONF	PF	PA	STK
^{(4)} New England Patriots	10	6	0	.625	5–1	7–5	379	338	L1
Miami Dolphins	9	7	0	.563	3–3	7–5	318	317	W6
Buffalo Bills	5	11	0	.313	2–4	5–7	271	367	L1
New York Jets	4	12	0	.250	2–4	3–9	240	355	W1
