= 2005 Cleveland Browns season =

57th season in franchise history

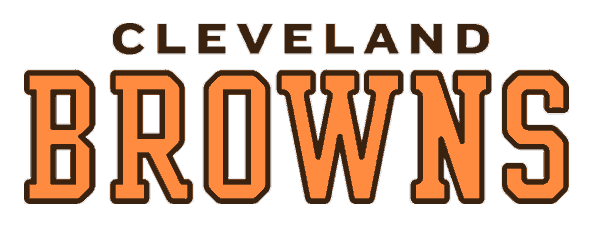
- Owner: Randy Lerner
- General manager: Phil Savage
- Head coach: Romeo Crennel
- Home stadium: Cleveland Browns Stadium

Results
- Record: 6–10
- Division place: 4th AFC North
- Playoffs: Did not qualify
- Pro Bowlers: None

The 2005 season was the Cleveland Browns' 53rd in the National Football League (NFL) and their 57th overall. It was their 1st season under general manager Phil Savage and head coach Romeo Crennel. They posted a record of 6–10, improving upon their 2004 record of 4–12. However, the Browns failed to qualify for the playoffs for the third consecutive season.

== Offseason ==
=== 2005 NFL draft ===
Selection		Player	Position	College
Round	Pick	Player	Position	College
1	3	Braylon Edwards	Wide receiver	Michigan
2	34	Brodney Pool	Safety	Oklahoma
3	67	Charlie Frye	Quarterback	Akron
4	103	Antonio Perkins	Cornerback	Oklahoma
5	139	David McMillan	Defensive end	Kansas
6	176	Nick Speegle	Linebacker	New Mexico
6	203	Andrew Hoffman	Defensive tackle	Virginia
7	217	Jonathan Dunn	Offensive tackle	Virginia Tech

=== Undrafted free agents ===
2005 undrafted free agents of note
Player	Position	College
Lang Campbell	Quarterback	William & Mary
Josh Cribbs	Wide receiver	Kent State
Paul Irons	Tight end	Florida State
Lance Moore	Wide receiver	Toledo
J'Vonne Parker	Defensive tackle	Rutgers

== Personnel ==
2005 Cleveland Browns staff
Front office: Owner and chairman – Randy Lerner; President and chief executive officer – John Collins; Senior vice president and General manager - Phil Savage; Director of Player Personnel - Bill Rees; Assistant Director of Player Personnel - T.J. McCreight; Pro Personnel Coordinator - Steve Sabo; Head coaches: Head coach – Romeo Crennel; Offensive coaches: Offensive coordinator – Maurice Carthon; Quarterbacks – Rip Scherer; Running backs – Dave Atkins; Wide receivers – Terry Robiskie; Tight ends – Ben Coates; Offensive line - Jeff Davidson; Assistant offensive line – Jeff Uhlenhake; Offensive quality control - Carl Crennel II	Defensive coaches: Defensive coordinator – Todd Grantham; Defensive line – Randy Melvin; Linebackers – Mike Haluchak; Secondary – Mel Tucker; Defensive assistant – Bobby Trott; Defensive quality control - Cory Undlin; Special teams coaches: Special teams coordinator – Jerry Rosburg; Strength and conditioning: Head strength and conditioning – John Lott; Assistant strength and conditioning – Tom Myslinski

== Roster ==
2005 Cleveland Browns roster
Quarterbacks (QB): 3 Derek Anderson; 8 Trent Dilfer; 9 Charlie Frye; Running backs (RB): 34 Reuben Droughns; 31 William Green KR; 36 Corey McIntyre FB; 42 Terrelle Smith FB; 44 Lee Suggs; Wide receivers (WR): 81 Antonio Bryant; 16 Josh Cribbs; 88 Frisman Jackson; 86 Dennis Northcutt; 11 Brandon Rideau; Tight ends (TE): 89 Paul Irons; 84 John Owens; 83 Aaron Shea	Offensive linemen (OL): 63 Joe Andruzzi G; 65 Kirk Chambers RT; 60 Cosey Coleman G; 70 Nat Dorsey LT; 50 Dwayne Ledford C; 61 Mike Pucillo C; 66 L. J. Shelton LT; 72 Ryan Tucker RT; 68 Dave Yovanovits G; Defensive linemen (DL): 98 Nick Eason NT; 95 Jason Fisk NT; 75 Simon Fraser DE; 97 Alvin McKinley DE; 69 J'Vonne Parker DE; 99 Orpheus Roye DE	Linebackers (LB): 54 Andra Davis ILB; 96 Kenard Lang OLB; 90 David McMillan OLB; 94 Orlando Ruff ILB; 59 Nick Speegle OLB; 55 Matt Stewart OLB; 58 Ben Taylor ILB; 51 Chaun Thompson OLB; 53 Mason Unck ILB; Defensive backs (DB): 28 Leigh Bodden CB; 25 Chris Crocker SS; 20 Pete Hunter CB; 26 Sean Jones SS; 39 Michael Lehan CB; 33 Daylon McCutcheon CB; 23 Ray Mickens CB; 30 Antonio Perkins CB; 21 Brodney Pool FS; 27 Brian Russell FS; Special teams (ST): 4 Phil Dawson K; 57 Jody Littleton LS; 10 Kyle Richardson P	Practice squad: -- Atlas Herrion G; 91 Andrew Hoffman DE; 56 Justin Kurpeikis ILB; -- Pete McMahon OT; 18 Kendrick Mosley WR; -- Clifton Smith ILB; -- James Thornton CB; 29 Jason Wright RB; Reserve: 28 Gary Baxter CB (IR); 79 Lewis Dawson OT; 71 Jon Dunn OT; 17 Braylon Edwards WR (IR); 50 Jeff Faine C (IR); 94 Amon Gordon NT (IR); -- Antwan Harris S (IR); 82 Steve Heiden TE (IR); 49 Keith Heinrich TE (IR); 78 Ethan Kelley NT (IR); 64 Ryan Pontbriand LS (IR); 80 Kellen Winslow II TE (NF-Inj.); Rookies in italics 53 active, 12 reserve, 8 practice squad

== Regular season ==
=== Schedule ===
In addition to their regular games with AFC North rivals, the Browns played teams from the AFC South and NFC North as per the schedule rotation, and also played intraconference games against the Miami Dolphins and the Oakland Raiders based on divisional positions from 2004.

Week	Date	Opponent	Result	Record	Stadium	Attendance	Recap
1	September 11	**Cincinnati Bengals**	**L** 13–27	0–1	Cleveland Browns Stadium	73,013	Recap
2	September 18	at Green Bay Packers	**W** 26–24	1–1	Lambeau Field	70,400	Recap
3	September 25	at Indianapolis Colts	**L** 6–13	1–2	RCA Dome	57,127	Recap
4	Bye						
5	October 9	Chicago Bears	**W** 20–10	2–2	Cleveland Browns Stadium	73,079	Recap
6	October 16	at **Baltimore Ravens**	**L** 3–16	2–3	M&T Bank Stadium	70,196	Recap
7	October 23	Detroit Lions	**L** 10–13	2–4	Cleveland Browns Stadium	72,923	Recap
8	October 30	at Houston Texans	**L** 16–19	2–5	Reliant Stadium	70,064	Recap
9	November 6	Tennessee Titans	**W** 20–14	3–5	Cleveland Browns Stadium	72,594	Recap
10	November 13	at **Pittsburgh Steelers**	**L** 21–34	3–6	Heinz Field	63,491	Recap
11	November 20	Miami Dolphins	**W** 22–0	4–6	Cleveland Browns Stadium	72,773	Recap
12	November 27	at Minnesota Vikings	**L** 12–24	4–7	Hubert H. Humphrey Metrodome	63,814	Recap
13	December 4	Jacksonville Jaguars	**L** 14–20	4–8	Cleveland Browns Stadium	70,941	Recap
14	December 11	at **Cincinnati Bengals**	**L** 20–23	4–9	Paul Brown Stadium	65,788	Recap
15	December 18	at Oakland Raiders	**W** 9–7	5–9	McAfee Coliseum	41,862	Recap
16	December 24	**Pittsburgh Steelers**	**L** 0–41	5–10	Cleveland Browns Stadium	73,136	Recap
17	January 1	**Baltimore Ravens**	**W** 20–16	6–10	Cleveland Browns Stadium	69,871	Recap

Note: Intra-divisional opponents are in bold text.

== Standings ==
AFC North
	W	L	T	PCT	DIV	CONF	PF	PA	STK
^{(3)} Cincinnati Bengals	11	5	0	.688	5–1	7–5	421	350	L2
^{(6)} Pittsburgh Steelers	11	5	0	.688	4–2	7–5	389	258	W4
Baltimore Ravens	6	10	0	.375	2–4	4–8	265	299	L1
Cleveland Browns	6	10	0	.375	1–5	4–8	232	301	W1
