= List of Villanova Wildcats in the NFL draft =

This is a list of Villanova Wildcats in the NFL Draft.

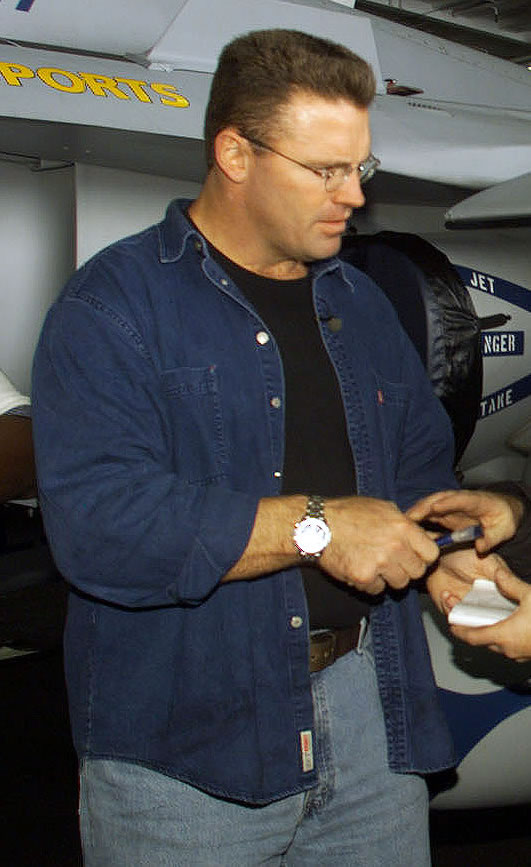
Howie Long

== Key ==
B	Back	K	Kicker	NT	Nose tackle
C	Center	LB	Linebacker	FB	Fullback
DB	Defensive back	P	Punter	HB	Halfback
DE	Defensive end	QB	Quarterback	WR	Wide receiver
DT	Defensive tackle	RB	Running back	G	Guard
E	End	T	Offensive tackle	TE	Tight end

== Selections ==
Year	Round	Pick	Player	Team	Position
1936	2	14	Ed Michaels	Chicago Bears	G
1938	9	78	John Mellus	New York Giants	T
1939	3	21	John Wysocki	Chicago Bears	E
1939	21	193	Matt Kuber	Washington Redskins	G
1940	7	51	Andy Chisick	Chicago Cardinals	C
1943	20	184	Roy Ericson	Chicago Cardinals	G
1943	21	193	George Smith	Chicago Cardinals	B
1943	28	265	Steve Pritko	Cleveland Rams	E
1944	18	179	Bill Sullivan	Pittsburgh Steelers	E
1944	18	185	Ziggy Zamlynski	Cleveland Rams	B
1944	22	228	Al Postus	Philadelphia Eagles	B
1944	31	321	Karl Vogt	Chicago Bears	T
1945	13	124	Joe Pezelski	Boston Yanks	B
1945	19	189	Al Kasulin	Brooklyn Dodgers	B
1945	20	198	Bill Lilienthal	Pittsburgh Steelers	T
1945	24	245	Ziggy Gory	Boston Yanks	C
1945	25	257	Gene Konopka	Cleveland Rams	G
1946	22	201	Clem Andrulewicz	Chicago Cardinals	T
1947	27	253	Bob David	Los Angeles Rams	B
1948	31	293	Bob Polidor	Chicago Cardinals	B
1949	3	25	Lou Ferry	Green Bay Packers	T
1949	5	48	Ed Berrang	Washington Redskins	E
1950	1	9	Ralph Pasquariello	Los Angeles Rams	B
1950	2	18	John Sandusky	Cleveland Browns	T
1950	3	36	Steve Romanik	Chicago Bears	B
1950	11	136	Dan Brown	Washington Redskins	E
1951	4	44	Pete D'Alonzo	Detroit Lions	B
1952	15	181	Bill Hegarty	Los Angeles Rams	T
1952	20	234	Dan Simeone	Pittsburgh Steelers	T
1953	17	195	Bob Haner	Washington Redskins	B
1954	7	78	Ralph Cecere	Chicago Bears	B
1954	11	124	Tom Fitzpatrick	New York Giants	G
1954	12	138	Joe Faragalli	Chicago Bears	G
1954	23	272	Pete Carrieri	Washington Redskins	G
1954	27	321	Ben Addiego	Philadelphia Eagles	B
1955	24	282	Mike Mayock	Pittsburgh Steelers	E
1956	21	249	Don McComb	New York Giants	E
1957	19	225	John Bauer	Washington Redskins	B
1957	25	300	Joe Ryan	Chicago Bears	C
1958	12	138	Eddie Michaels	Washington Redskins	G
1959	4	39	Jim Grazione	Philadelphia Eagles	QB
1959	8	89	Gene O'Pella	Washington Redskins	E
1959	10	110	Rollie West	Philadelphia Eagles	B
1959	17	195	Bill Craig	Philadelphia Eagles	T
1960	17	193	Emanuel Congedo	Los Angeles Rams	E
1962	7	96	Frank Budd	Philadelphia Eagles	WR
1962	11	142	Ronnie Meyers	Cleveland Browns	E
1962	13	182	Tom Kepner	Green Bay Packers	T
1963	3	38	Larry Glueck	Chicago Bears	DB
1963	8	112	Louis Rettino	Green Bay Packers	B
1963	9	119	Billy Joe	Washington Redskins	RB
1963	16	223	Charlie Johnson	Detroit Lions	T
1964	18	245	Tom Smith	Los Angeles Rams	G
1965	4	50	Mike Strofolino	Los Angeles Rams	LB
1965	6	84	Al Atkinson	Baltimore Colts	T
1969	1	12	Richie Moore	Green Bay Packers	DT
1969	9	212	John Sodaski	Pittsburgh Steelers	DB
1970	11	268	Bill Walik	Philadelphia Eagles	DB
1972	1	21	Mike Siani	Oakland Raiders	WR
1972	2	39	John Babinecz	Dallas Cowboys	LB
1972	13	323	Ernie Mesmer	Pittsburgh Steelers	T
1973	7	160	Kevin Reilly	Miami Dolphins	LB
1974	11	282	Joe Miller	Washington Redskins	T
1974	14	356	John Givens	Atlanta Falcons	G
1975	5	109	John Zimba	Cleveland Browns	DE
1976	11	307	Gary Shugrue	Detroit Lions	DE
1976	13	358	Steve Ebbecke	Philadelphia Eagles	DB
1977	10	259	John Mastronardo	Philadelphia Eagles	WR
1981	2	48	Howie Long	Los Angeles Raiders	DT
1981	9	240	David Martin	Detroit Lions	DB
2002	3	91	Brian Westbrook	Philadelphia Eagles	RB
2008	6	207	Matt Sherry	Cincinnati Bengals	TE
2011	2	49	Benjamin Ijalana	Indianapolis Colts	T
2017	2	59	Tanoh Kpassagnon	Kansas City Chiefs	DE
2017	7	236	Brad Seaton	Tennessee Titans	T
2022	6	185	Christian Benford	Buffalo Bills	DB

== Notable undrafted players ==
Note: No drafts held before 1920

Debut year	Player name	Debut NFL/AFL team	Position	Notes
1958	Rick Sapienza	Philadelphia Eagles	DB/RB	—
1968	Gene Ceppetelli	Philadelphia Eagles	C	—
1975	Ernie DeChellis	Green Bay Packers	WR	—
1979	Vince Thompson	Denver Broncos	RB	—
1980	Paul Columbia	Green Bay Packers	TE	—
1987	George Winslow	Cleveland Browns	P	—
1992	Willie Oshodin	Denver Broncos	DE	—
1998	Brian Finneran	Seattle Seahawks	WR	—
2004	Clarence Curry	Arizona Cardinals	DB	—
2005	Terry Butler	New York Jets	RB	—
2005	Raymond Ventrone	New England Patriots	S	—
2007	Christian Gaddis	Buffalo Bills	T	—
2009	Darrel Young	Washington Redskins	RB	—
2010	Ross Ventrone	New England Patriots	DB	—
2017	Austin Calitro	New York Jets	LB	—
2019	Ethan Greenidge	New Orleans Saints	G	—
2022	Forrest Rhyne	Indianapolis Colts	LB	—
