= 2005 NFL draft =

2005 American football draft

General information
- Date: April 23–24, 2005
- Time: 12:00 p.m. EDT (April 23); 11:00 a.m. EDT (April 24)
- Location: Jacob K. Javits Convention Center in New York City
- Networks: ESPN, ESPN2

Overview
- 255 total selections in 7 rounds
- League: NFL
- First selection: Alex Smith, QB; San Francisco 49ers
- Mr. Irrelevant: Andy Stokes, TE; New England Patriots
- Most selections (12): Tampa Bay Buccaneers
- Fewest selections (4): New York Giants
- Hall of Famers: 1: LB DeMarcus Ware

The 2005 NFL draft, the 70th in league history, took place on April 23 and 24, 2005. The draft was held at the Jacob K. Javits Convention Center in New York City and was televised for the 26th consecutive year, with coverage on ESPN and ESPN2. It was the first to be held at the Javits Center, as Madison Square Garden had been utilized for drafts since 1995.

The draft is best known for quarterback Aaron Rodgers falling to the 24th selection after being projected as one of the top picks. Rodgers believed he would be taken first overall by the San Francisco 49ers, but after the 49ers selected quarterback Alex Smith, Rodgers was passed on by teams with other positional needs until he was drafted by the Green Bay Packers. The fall drew retrospective scrutiny due to Rodgers developing a reputation as one of the greatest quarterbacks of all time. Rodgers is currently the only remaining player from the draft class still in the league as of 2026, with his career currently spanning 22 seasons overall, and he later announced that the 2026 season will be his final season in the NFL.

Compensatory selections were distributed among 14 teams, with the Philadelphia Eagles and St. Louis Rams garnering the most with four picks each. Three of the first five picks were running backs, an NFL draft first.

The league also held a supplemental draft in 2005 after the regular draft but before the regular season.

The 255 players chosen in the draft were composed of:

- 36 linebackers
- 31 wide receivers
- 29 cornerbacks
- 26 offensive tackles
- 26 running backs
- 20 safeties
- 20 defensive ends
- 15 defensive tackles
- 15 guards
- 14 quarterbacks
- 9 tight ends
- 8 centers
- 3 kickers
- 2 punters
- 1 kick returner

== Player selections ==
*	= compensatory selection
†	= Pro Bowler (Note: Players are identified as a Pro Bowler if they were selected for the Pro Bowl at any time in their career.)
‡	= Hall of Famer (Note: Players are identified as a Hall of Famer if they have been inducted into the Pro Football Hall of Fame.)

Positions key
Offense	Defense	Special teams
QB — Quarterback; RB — Running back; FB — Fullback; WR — Wide receiver; TE — Tight end; OL — Offensive lineman; T — Tackle; G — Guard; C — Center	DL — Defensive lineman; DT — Defensive tackle (Note: Includes nose tackle (NT)); DE — Defensive end; EDGE — Edge rusher; LB — Linebacker (Note: Includes middle linebacker (MLB/MIKE), weakside linebacker (WILL), strongside linebacker (SAM), off-ball linebacker, and outside linebacker (OLB)); DB — Defensive back; CB — Cornerback; S — Safety (Note: Includes free safety (FS) and strong safety (SS))	K — Kicker (Note: Also known as a placekicker (PK)); P — Punter; LS — Long snapper; RS — Return specialist (Note: Includes kickoff and punt returners)

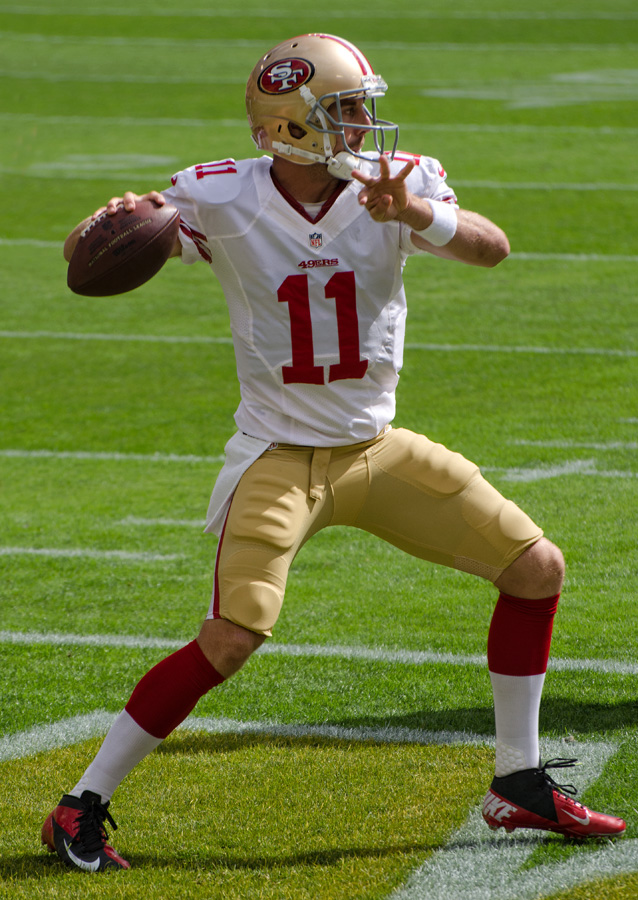
Quarterback Alex Smith, taken first overall, struggled for his first few years before becoming a solid starter after 2011 for the San Francisco 49ers, a Pro Bowler with the Kansas City Chiefs and a starter with the Washington Redskins. He overcame a severe leg injury in his final season.

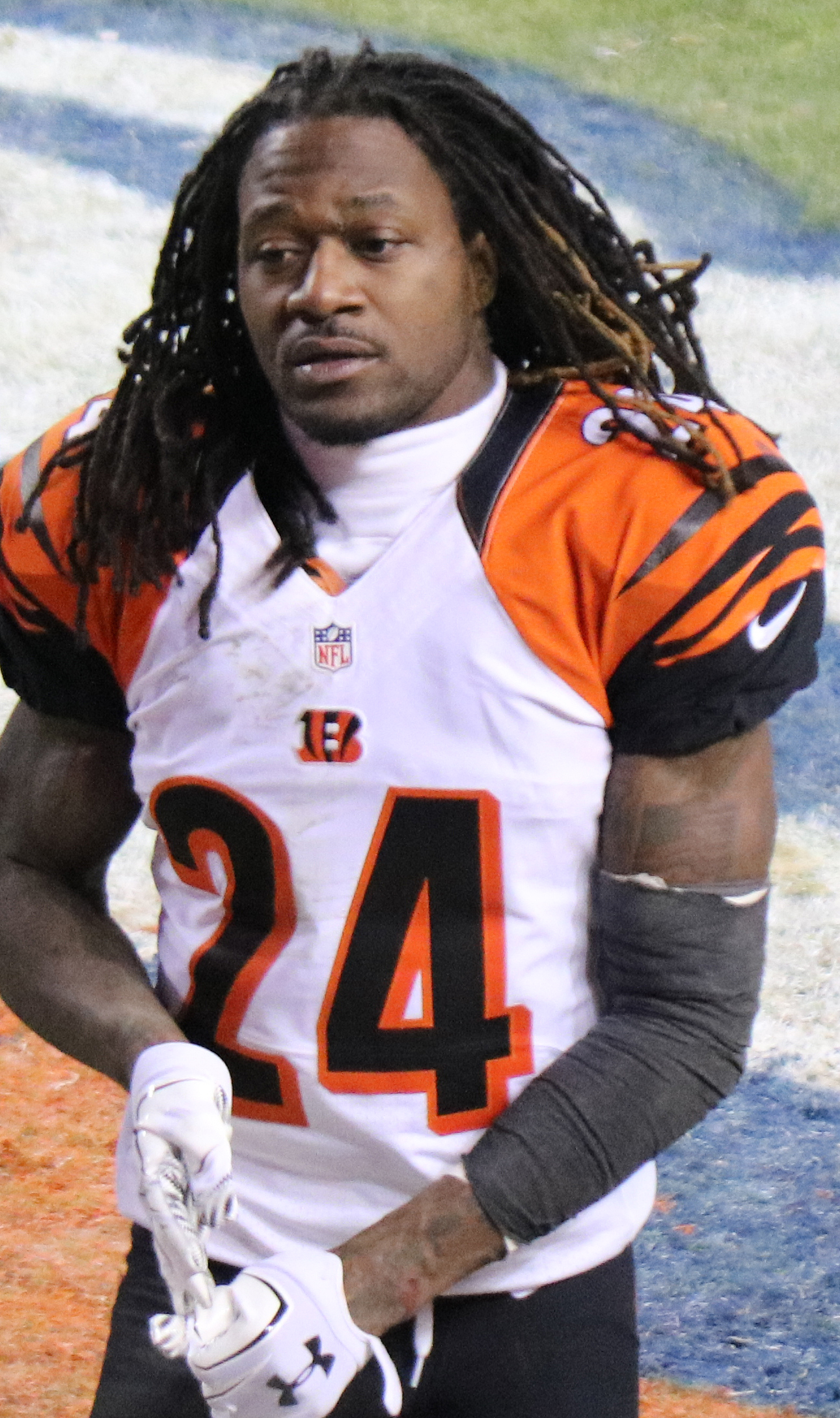
Cornerback Adam "Pacman" Jones, taken sixth overall, enjoyed a long career despite several off-field incidents.

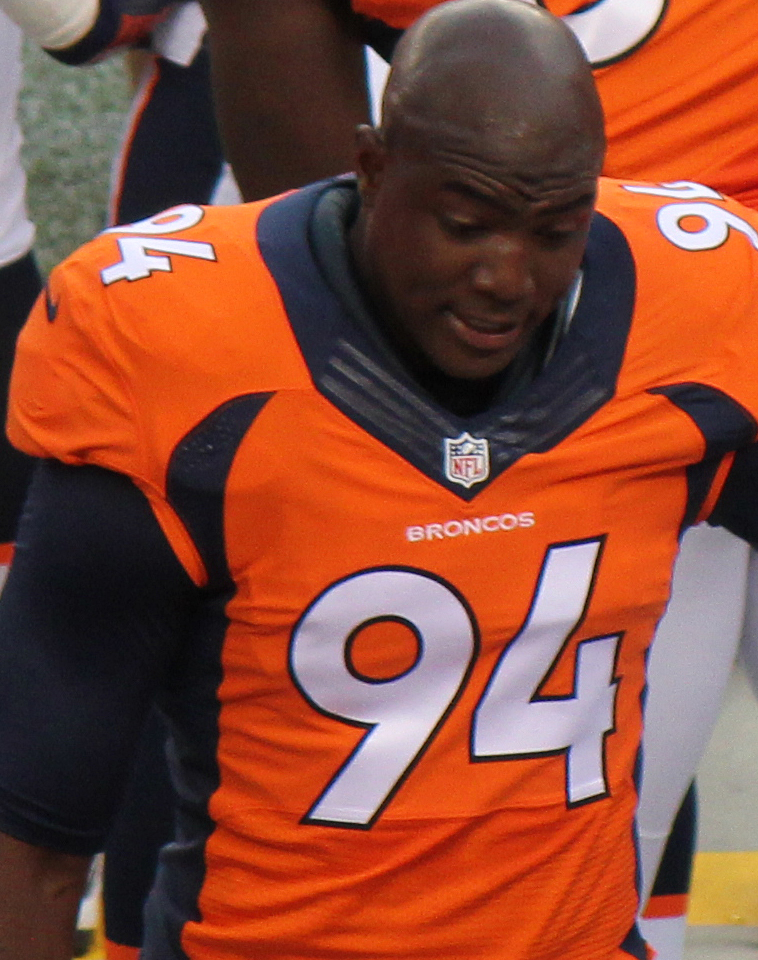
Linebacker DeMarcus Ware, taken 11th overall, was a stalwart on the Dallas Cowboys defense before finishing his career with the Denver Broncos.

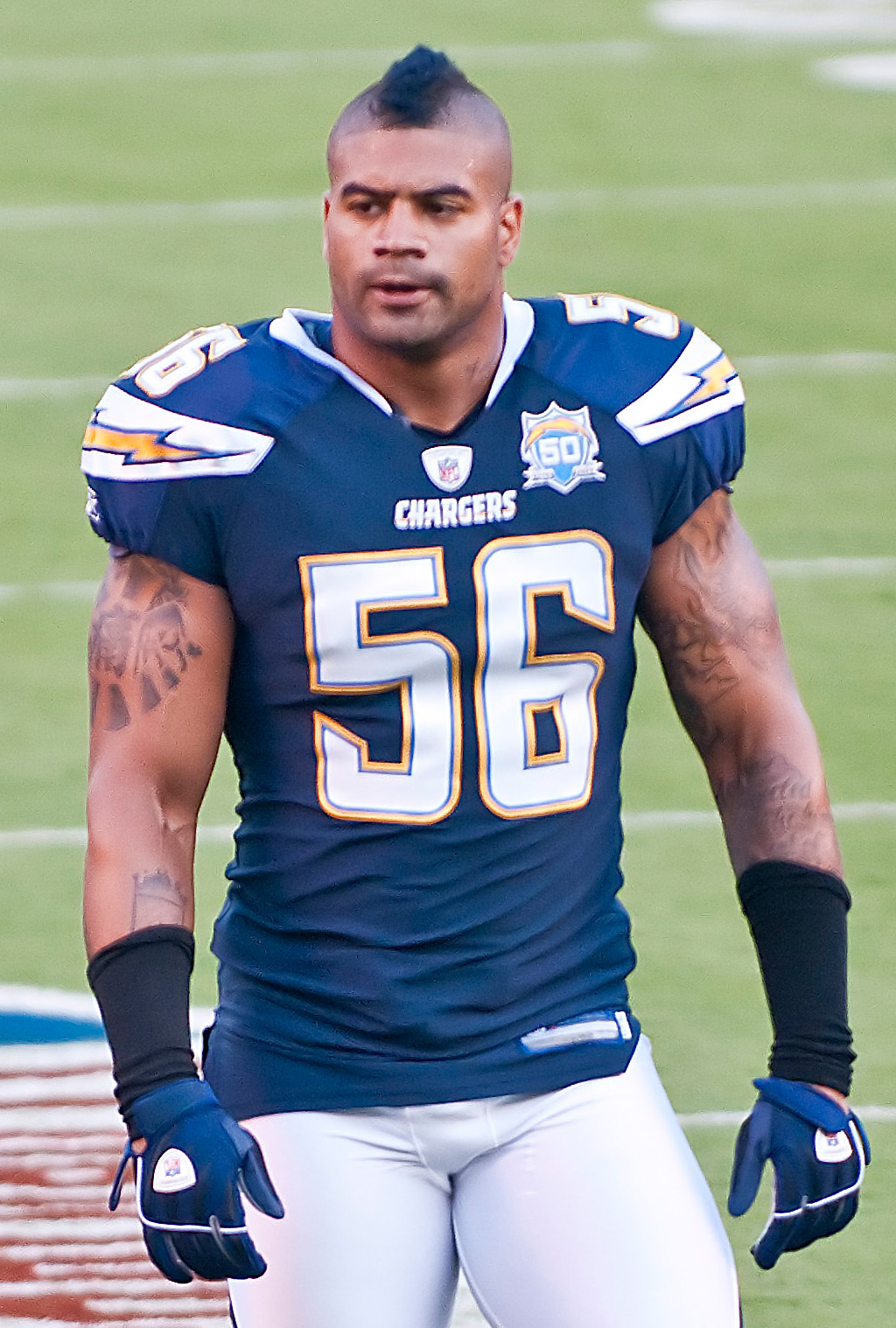
Linebacker Shawne Merriman, taken 12th overall, was a three-time All-Pro and led the NFL in sacks in 2006.

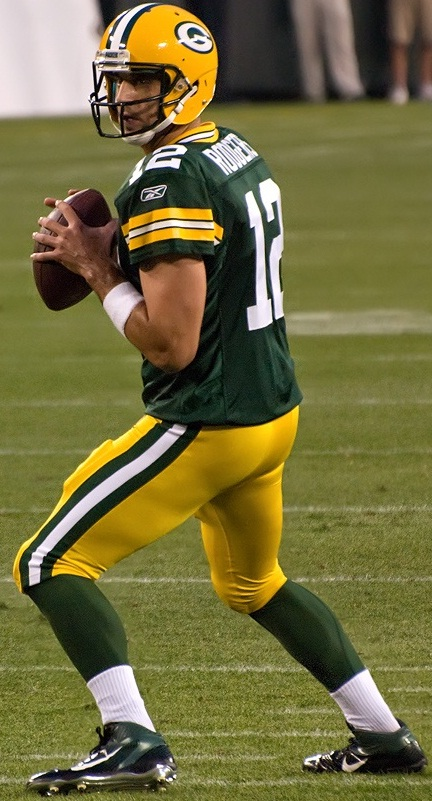
Aaron Rodgers, taken 24th overall, went on to play 21 seasons in the NFL, 18 with the Green Bay Packers.

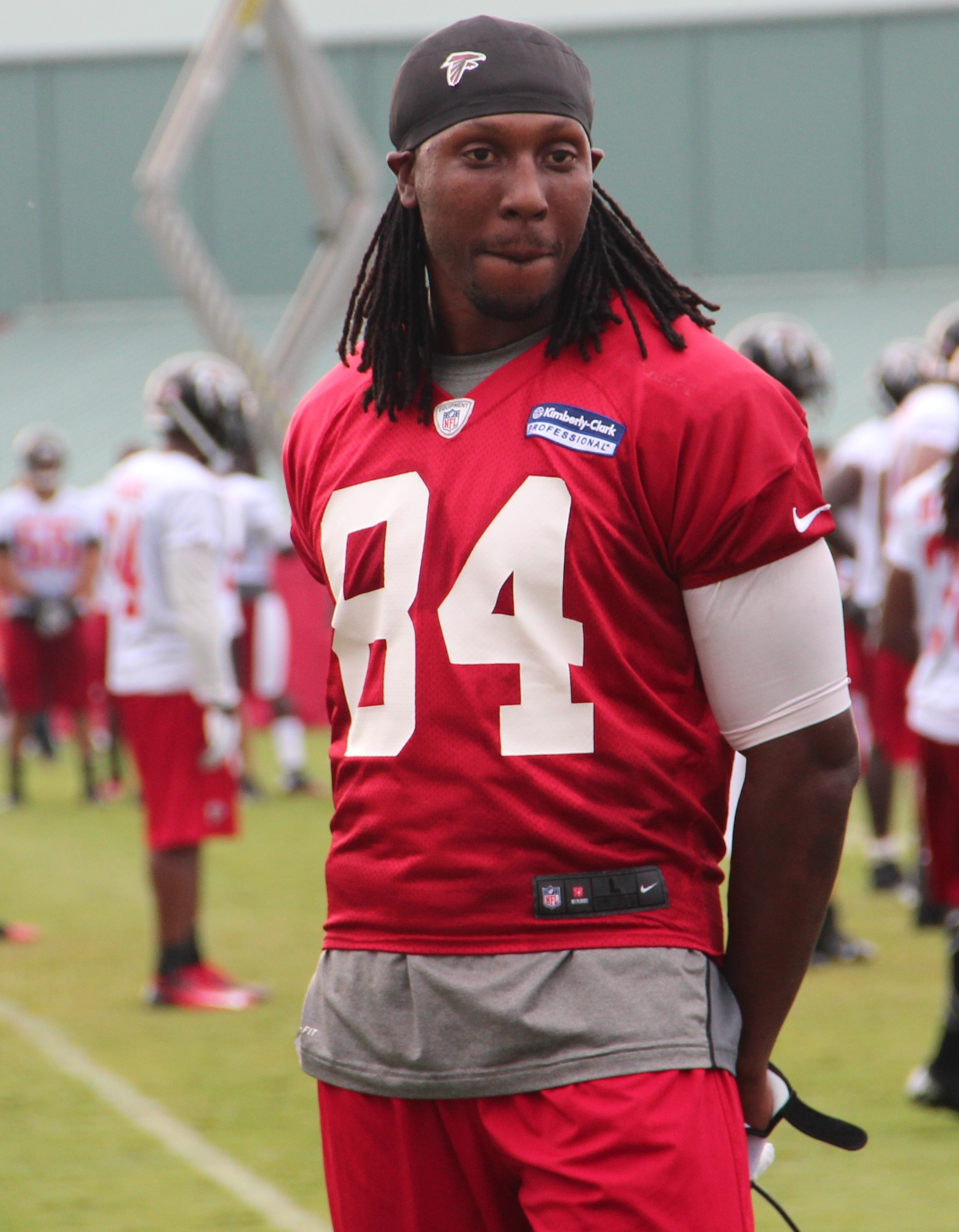
Receiver Roddy White, taken 27th overall, was a four-time Pro Bowler and holds many Atlanta Falcons receiving records.

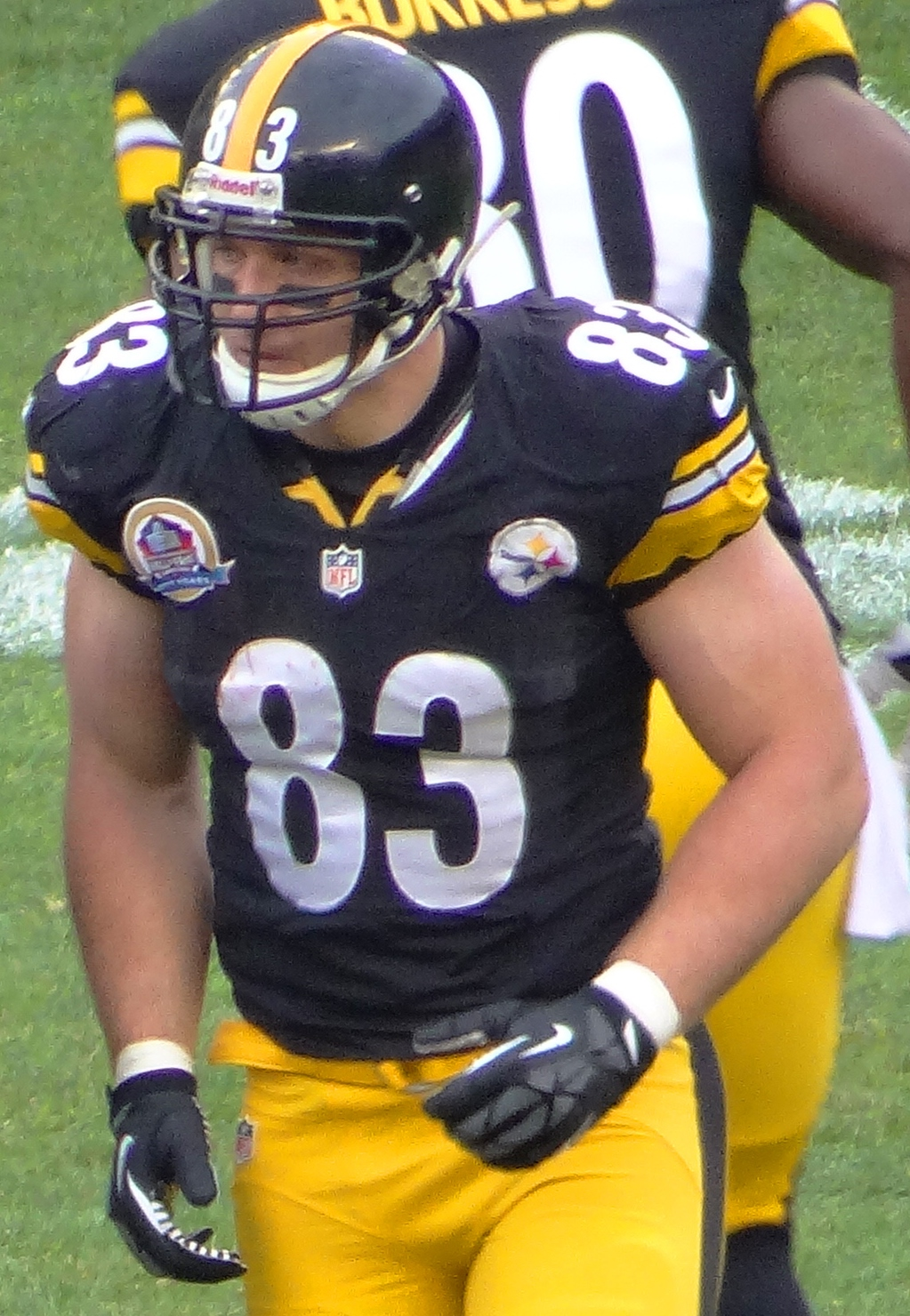
Tight end Heath Miller, taken 30th overall, won two Super Bowls with the Pittsburgh Steelers and was a fan favorite.

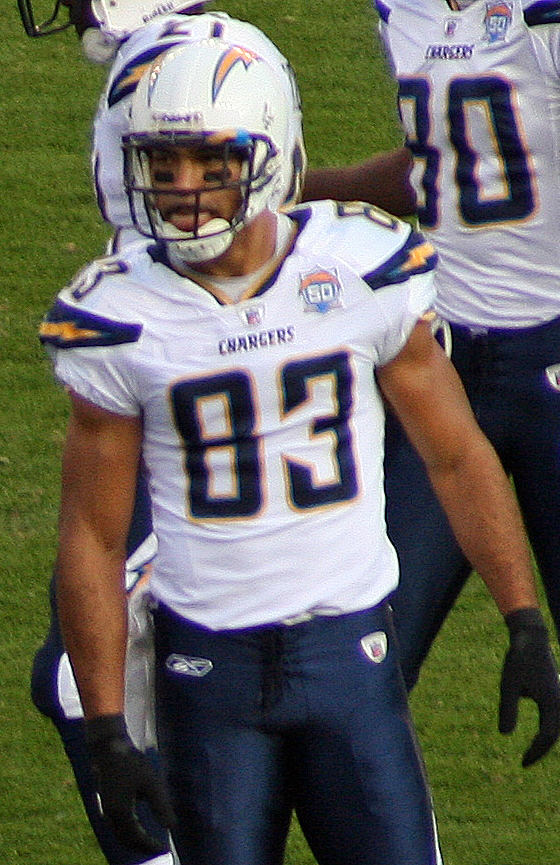
Receiver Vincent Jackson, taken 61st overall in the second round, was a three-time Pro Bowler with the San Diego Chargers and Tampa Bay Buccaneers.

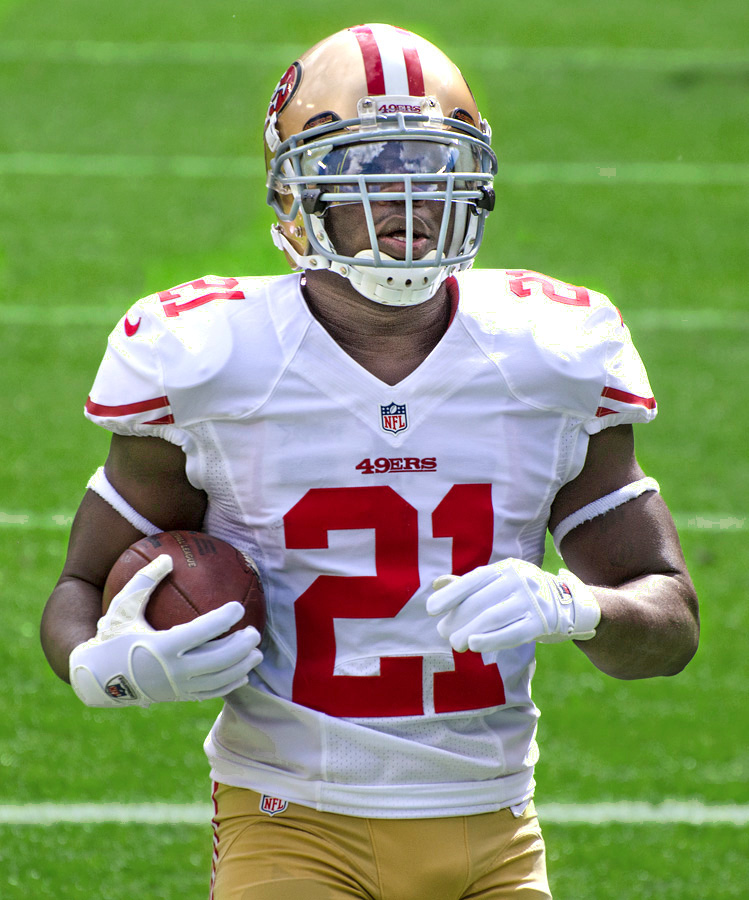
Running back Frank Gore, taken 65th overall in the third round, currently ranks third on the NFL's all-time career rushing list.

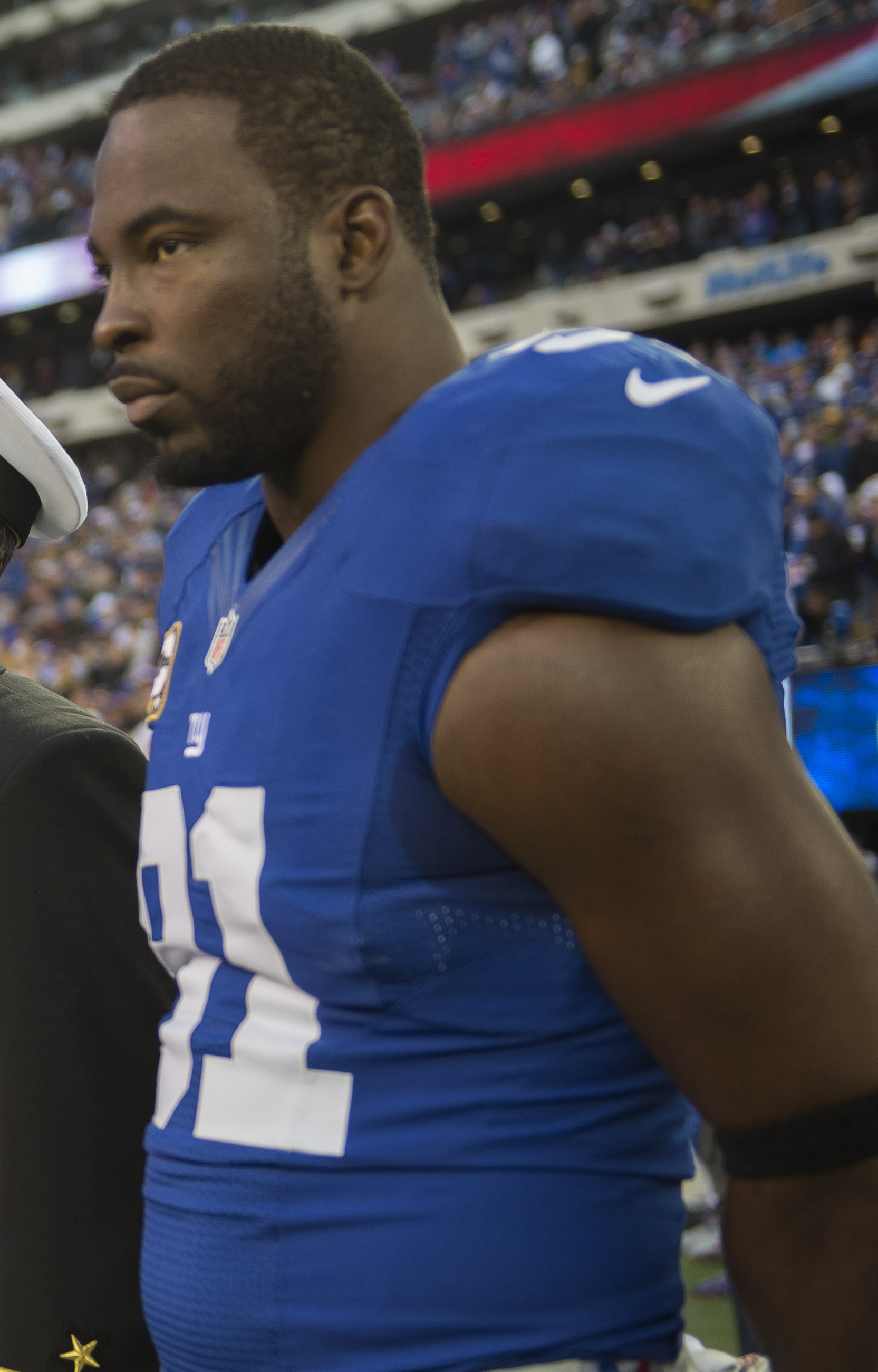
Defensive end Justin Tuck, drafted 74th overall in the third round, won two Super Bowls with the New York Giants and was a two-time All-Pro.

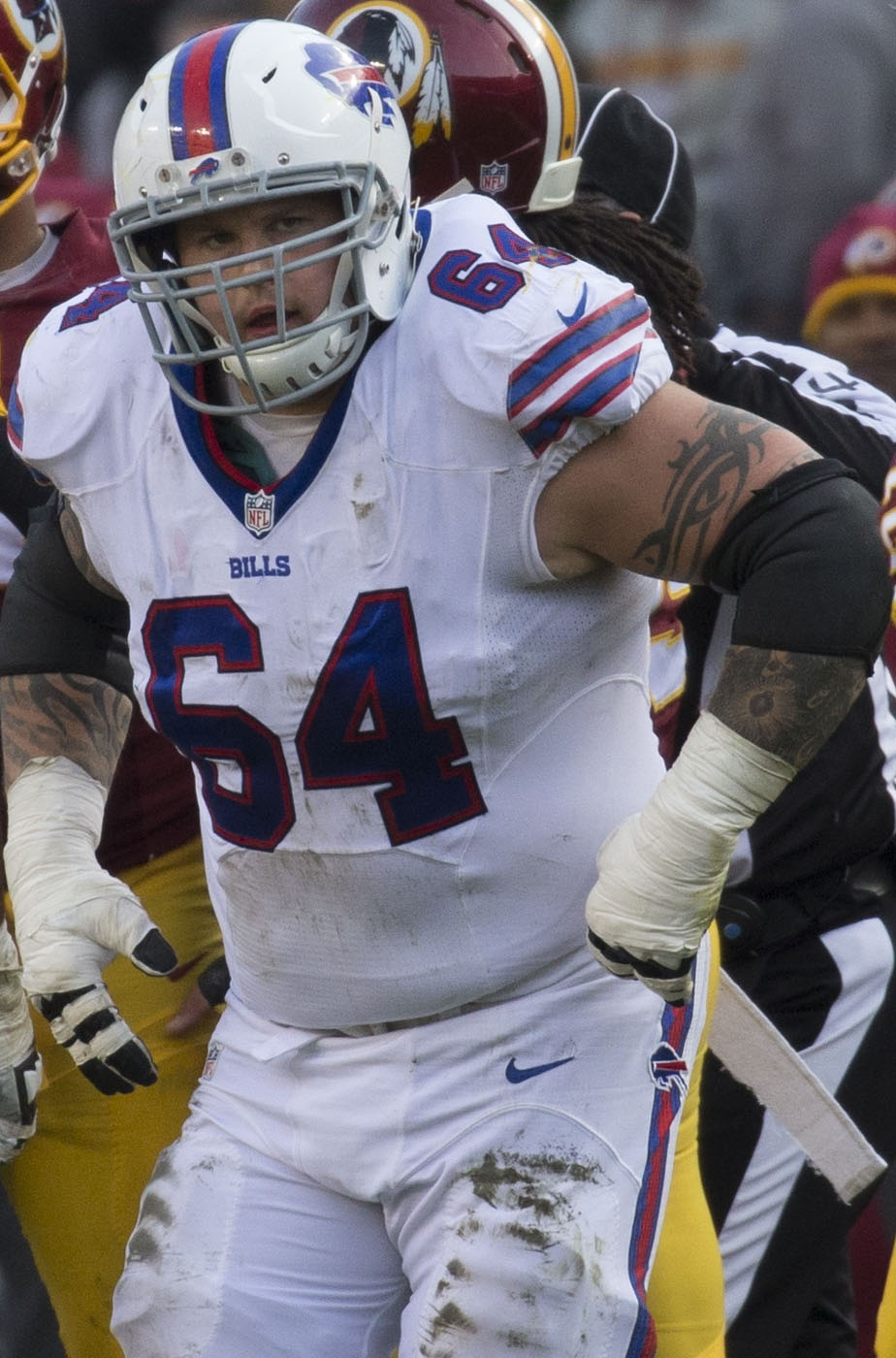
Guard Richie Incognito, drafted 81st overall, is a four-time Pro Bowler but has also drawn controversy, including a bullying scandal in 2013.

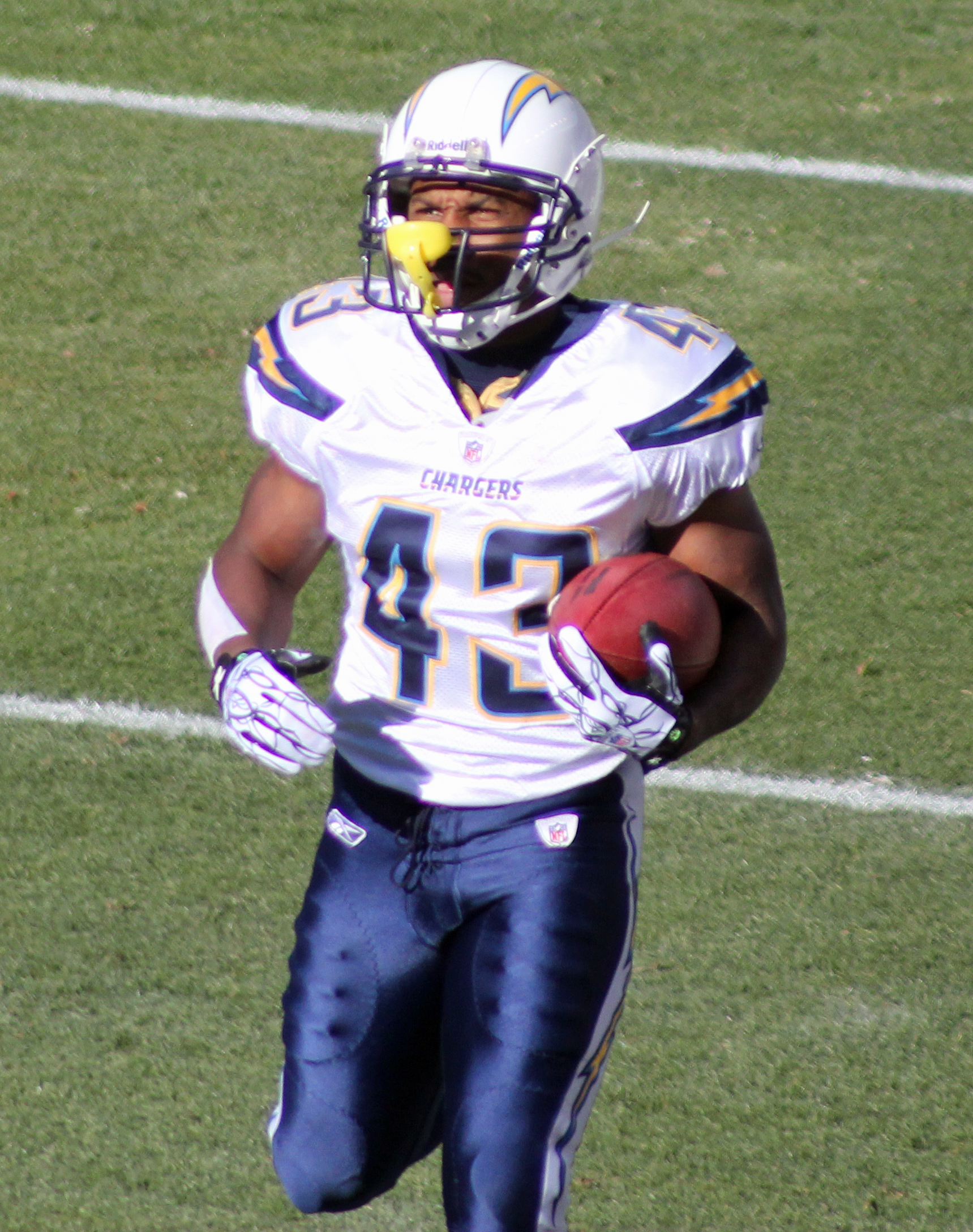
Running back/kick returner Darren Sproles, drafted in the fourth round, has the fifth-most career all-purpose yards in the NFL.

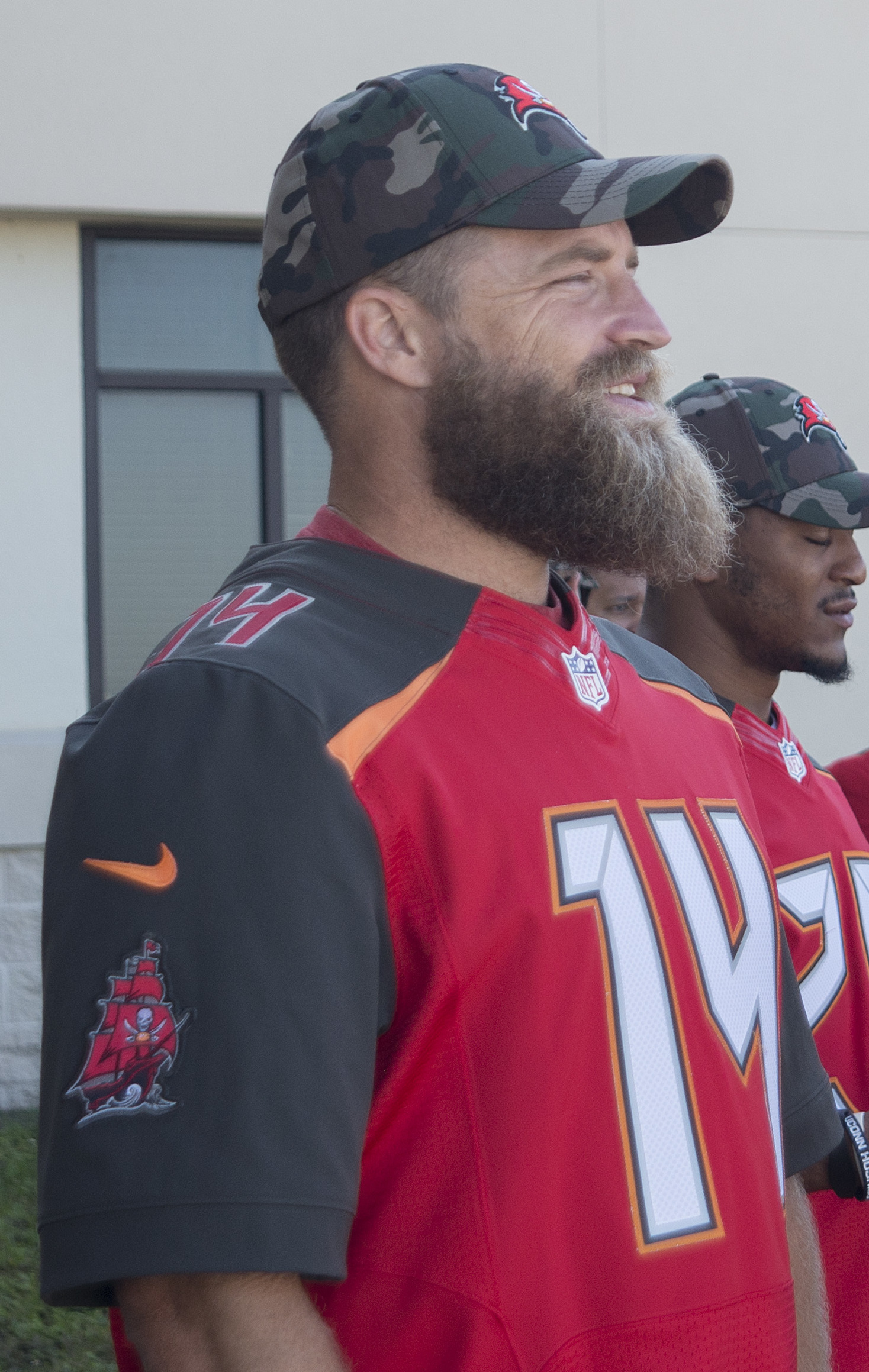
Quarterback Ryan Fitzpatrick, drafted in the seventh round, started for an NFL record nine teams

Rnd.	Pick	Team	Player	Pos.	College	Notes
1	1	San Francisco 49ers	Alex Smith ^{†}	QB	Utah	
1	2	Miami Dolphins	Ronnie Brown ^{†}	RB	Auburn	
1	3	Cleveland Browns	Braylon Edwards ^{†}	WR	Michigan	
1	4	Chicago Bears	Cedric Benson	RB	Texas	
1	5	Tampa Bay Buccaneers	Cadillac Williams	RB	Auburn	
1	6	Tennessee Titans	Adam Jones ^{†}	CB	West Virginia	
1	7	Minnesota Vikings	Troy Williamson	WR	South Carolina	from Oakland (Note: No. 7: Oakland → Minnesota (PD). Oakland traded first- and seventh-round selections (7th and 219th overall) to Minnesota in exchange for WR Randy Moss.)
1	8	Arizona Cardinals	Antrel Rolle ^{†}	S	Miami (FL)	
1	9	Washington Redskins	Carlos Rogers ^{†}	CB	Auburn	
1	10	Detroit Lions	Mike Williams	WR	USC	
1	11	Dallas Cowboys	DeMarcus Ware^{‡}^{†}	LB	Troy	
1	12	San Diego Chargers	Shawne Merriman ^{†}	LB	Maryland	from NY Giants (Note: No. 12: NY Giants → San Diego (PD). The NY Giants traded first- and fifth-round selections (12th and 144th overall) and a 2004 third-round selection to San Diego in exchange for QB Eli Manning.)
1	13	New Orleans Saints	Jammal Brown ^{†}	T	Oklahoma	from Houston (Note: No. 13: Houston → New Orleans (D). Houston traded a first-round selection (13th overall) to New Orleans in exchange for first- and third-round selections (16th and 66th overall).)
1	14	Carolina Panthers	Thomas Davis ^{†}	LB	Georgia	
1	15	Kansas City Chiefs	Derrick Johnson ^{†}	LB	Texas	
1	16	Houston Texans	Travis Johnson	DT	Florida State	from New Orleans (Note: No. 16: New Orleans → Houston (D). See No. 13: Houston → New Orleans.)
1	17	Cincinnati Bengals	David Pollack	LB	Georgia	
1	18	Minnesota Vikings	Erasmus James	DE	Wisconsin	
1	19	St. Louis Rams	Alex Barron	T	Florida State	
1	20	Dallas Cowboys	Marcus Spears	DE	LSU	from Buffalo (Note: No. 20: Buffalo → Dallas (PD). Buffalo traded a first-round selection (20th overall), and 2004 second- and fifth-round selections to Dallas in exchange for a 2004 first-round selection.)
1	21	Jacksonville Jaguars	Matt Jones	WR	Arkansas	
1	22	Baltimore Ravens	Mark Clayton	WR	Oklahoma	
1	23	Oakland Raiders	Fabian Washington	CB	Nebraska	from Seattle (Note: No. 23: Seattle → Oakland (D). Seattle traded a first-round selection (23rd overall) to Oakland in exchange for first- and fifth-round selections (26th and 105th overall).)
1	24	Green Bay Packers	Aaron Rodgers ^{†}	QB	California	
1	25	Washington Redskins	Jason Campbell	QB	Auburn	from Denver (Note: No. 25: Denver → Washington (PD). Denver traded a first-round selection (25th overall) to Washington in exchange for a third-round selection (76th overall), and 2006 first- and fourth-round selections.)
1	26	Seattle Seahawks	Chris Spencer	C	Ole Miss	from NY Jets via Oakland (Note: No. 26: multiple trades: No. 26: NY Jets → Oakland (PD). The NY Jets traded first- and seventh-round selections (23rd and 230th overall) to Oakland in exchange for a second-round selection and two sixth-round selections (47th, 182nd and 185th overall) and TE Doug Jolley. No. 26: Oakland → Seattle (D). See No. 23: Seattle → Oakland.)
1	27	Atlanta Falcons	Roddy White ^{†}	WR	UAB	
1	28	San Diego Chargers	Luis Castillo	DT	Northwestern	
1	29	Indianapolis Colts	Marlin Jackson	CB	Michigan	
1	30	Pittsburgh Steelers	Heath Miller ^{†}	TE	Virginia	
1	31	Philadelphia Eagles	Mike Patterson	DT	USC	
1	32	New England Patriots	Logan Mankins ^{†}	G	Fresno State	
2	33	San Francisco 49ers	David Baas	C	Michigan	
2	34	Cleveland Browns	Brodney Pool	S	Oklahoma	
2	35	Philadelphia Eagles	Reggie Brown	WR	Georgia	from Miami (Note: No. 35: Miami → Philadelphia (PD). Miami traded a second-round selection (35th overall) to Philadelphia in exchange for QB A. J. Feeley.)
2	36	Tampa Bay Buccaneers	Barrett Ruud	LB	Nebraska	
2	37	Detroit Lions	Shaun Cody	DT	USC	from Tennessee (Note: No. 37: Tennessee → Detroit (D). Tennessee traded a second-round selection (37th overall) to Detroit in exchange for second- and fourth-round selections (41st and 113rd overall).)
2	38	Oakland Raiders	Stanford Routt	CB	Houston	
2	39	Chicago Bears	Mark Bradley	WR	Oklahoma	
2	40	New Orleans Saints	Josh Bullocks	S	Nebraska	from Washington (Note: No. 40: Washington → New Orleans (PD). Washington traded a second-round selection (40th overall) and a 2004 fifth-round selection to New Orleans in exchange for 2004 third- and fifth-round selections.)
2	41	Tennessee Titans	Michael Roos ^{†}	T	Eastern Washington	from Detroit (Note: No. 41: Detroit → Tennessee (D). See No. 37: Tennessee → Detroit.)
2	42	Dallas Cowboys	Kevin Burnett	LB	Tennessee	
2	43	New York Giants	Corey Webster	CB	LSU	
2	44	Arizona Cardinals	J. J. Arrington	RB	California	
2	45	Seattle Seahawks	Lofa Tatupu ^{†}	LB	USC	from Carolina (Note: No. 45: Carolina → Seattle (D). Carolina traded a second-round selection (45th overall) to Seattle in exchange for a second-round selection and two fourth-round selections (54th, 121st and 126th overall).)
2	46	Miami Dolphins	Matt Roth	DE	Iowa	from Kansas City (Note: No. 46: Kansas City → Miami (PD). Kansas City traded second- and fifth-round selections (46th and 162nd overall) to Miami in exchange for a fifth-round selection (138th overall) and CB Patrick Surtain.)
2	47	New York Jets	Mike Nugent	K	Ohio State	from Houston via Oakland (Note: No. 47: multiple trades: No. 47: Houston → Oakland (PD). Houston traded second- and third-round selections (47th and 78th overall) to Oakland in exchange for CB Phillip Buchanon. No. 47: Oakland → NY Jets (PD). See No. 26: Oakland → NY Jets.)
2	48	Cincinnati Bengals	Odell Thurman	LB	Georgia	
2	49	Minnesota Vikings	Marcus Johnson	T	Ole Miss	
2	50	St. Louis Rams	Ron Bartell	CB	Howard	
2	51	Green Bay Packers	Nick Collins ^{†}	S	Bethune–Cookman	from New Orleans (Note: No. 51: New Orleans → Green Bay (PD). New Orleans traded a second-round selection (51st overall) and QB J. T. O'Sullivan to Green Bay in exchange for a sixth-round selection (174th overall) and CB Mike McKenzie.)
2	52	Jacksonville Jaguars	Khalif Barnes	T	Washington	
2	53	Baltimore Ravens	Dan Cody	DE	Oklahoma	
2	54	Carolina Panthers	Eric Shelton	RB	Louisville	from Seattle (Note: No. 54: Seattle → Carolina (D). See No. 45: Carolina → Seattle.)
2	55	Buffalo Bills	Roscoe Parrish	WR	Miami (FL)	
2	56	Denver Broncos	Darrent Williams	CB	Oklahoma State	
2	57	New York Jets	Justin Miller ^{†}	CB	Clemson	
2	58	Green Bay Packers	Terrence Murphy	WR	Texas A&M	
2	59	Atlanta Falcons	Jonathan Babineaux	DT	Iowa	
2	60	Indianapolis Colts	Kelvin Hayden	CB	Illinois	
2	61	San Diego Chargers	Vincent Jackson ^{†}	WR	Northern Colorado	
2	62	Pittsburgh Steelers	Bryant McFadden	CB	Florida State	
2	63	Philadelphia Eagles	Matt McCoy	LB	San Diego State	
2	64	Baltimore Ravens	Adam Terry	T	Syracuse	from New England (Note: No. 64: New England → Baltimore (D). New England traded a second-round selection (64th overall) to Baltimore in exchange for third- and sixth-round selections (84th and 195th overall), and a 2006 third-round selection.)
3	65	San Francisco 49ers	Frank Gore ^{†}	RB	Miami (FL)	
3	66	St. Louis Rams	O. J. Atogwe	S	Stanford	from Miami (Note: No. 66: Miami → St. Louis (PD). Miami traded a third-round selection (66th overall) to St. Louis in exchange for RB Lamar Gordon.)
3	67	Cleveland Browns	Charlie Frye	QB	Akron	
3	68	Tennessee Titans	Courtney Roby	WR	Indiana	
3	69	Oakland Raiders	Andrew Walter	QB	Arizona State	
3	70	Miami Dolphins	Channing Crowder	LB	Florida	from Chicago (Note: No. 70: Chicago → Miami (PD). Chicago traded a third-round selection (70th overall) to Miami in exchange for DE Adewale Ogunleye.)
3	71	Tampa Bay Buccaneers	Alex Smith	TE	Stanford	
3	72	Detroit Lions	Stanley Wilson	CB	Stanford	
3	73	Houston Texans	Vernand Morency	RB	Oklahoma State	from Dallas (Note: No. 73: Dallas → Houston (PD). Dallas traded a third-round selection (73rd overall) to Houston in exchange for rights to QB Drew Henson.)
3	74	New York Giants	Justin Tuck ^{†}	DE	Notre Dame	
3	75	Arizona Cardinals	Eric Green	CB	Virginia Tech	
3	76	Denver Broncos	Karl Paymah	CB	Washington State	from Washington (Note: No. 76: Washington → Denver (PD). See No. 25: Denver → Washington.)
3	77	Philadelphia Eagles	Ryan Moats	RB	Louisiana Tech	from Kansas City (Note: No. 77: Kansas City → Philadelphia (PD). Kansas City traded a third-round selection (77th overall) and a 2004 fifth-round selection to Philadelphia in exchange for OT John Welbourn.)
3	78	Oakland Raiders	Kirk Morrison	LB	San Diego State	from Houston (Note: No. 78: Houston → Oakland (PD). See No. 47: Houston → Oakland.)
3	79	Carolina Panthers	Evan Mathis ^{†}	G	Alabama	
3	80	Minnesota Vikings	Dustin Fox	CB	Ohio State	
3	81	St. Louis Rams	Richie Incognito ^{†}	C	Nebraska	
3	82	New Orleans Saints	Alfred Fincher	LB	Connecticut	
3	83	Cincinnati Bengals	Chris Henry	WR	West Virginia	
3	84	New England Patriots	Ellis Hobbs	CB	Iowa State	from Baltimore (Note: No. 84: Baltimore → New England (D). See No. 64: New England → Baltimore.)
3	85	Seattle Seahawks	David Greene	QB	Georgia	
3	86	Buffalo Bills	Kevin Everett	TE	Miami (FL)	
3	87	Jacksonville Jaguars	Scott Starks	CB	Wisconsin	
3	88	New York Jets	Sione Pouha	DT	Utah	
3	89	Carolina Panthers	Atiyyah Ellison	DT	Missouri	from Green Bay (Note: No. 89: Green Bay → Carolina (D). Green Bay traded a third-round selection (89th overall) to Carolina in exchange for two fourth-round selections (115th and 126th overall).)
3	–	Denver Broncos	selection forfeited due to salary-cap violations.			
3	90	Atlanta Falcons	Jordan Beck	LB	Cal Poly	
3	91	Tampa Bay Buccaneers	Chris Colmer	T	NC State	from San Diego (Note: No. 91: San Diego → Tampa Bay (PD). San Diego traded third- and sixth-round selections (91st and 203rd overall) to Tampa Bay in exchange for WR Keenan McCardell.)
3	92	Indianapolis Colts	Vincent Burns	DE	Kentucky	
3	93	Pittsburgh Steelers	Trai Essex	G	Northwestern	
3	94	San Francisco 49ers	Adam Snyder	G	Oregon	from Philadelphia (Note: No. 94: Philadelphia → San Francisco (D). Philadelphia traded a third-round selection (94th overall) to San Francisco in exchange for fourth- and sixth-round selections (102nd and 175th overall).)
3	95	Arizona Cardinals	Darryl Blackstock	LB	Virginia	from New England (Note: No. 95: New England → Arizona (PD). New England traded third- and fifth-round selections (95th and 168th overall) to Arizona in exchange for a fifth-round selection (145th overall) and CB Duane Starks.)
3*	96	Tennessee Titans	Brandon Jones	WR	Oklahoma	
3*	97	Denver Broncos	Domonique Foxworth	CB	Maryland	
3*	98	Seattle Seahawks	Leroy Hill	LB	Clemson	
3*	99	Kansas City Chiefs	Dustin Colquitt ^{†}	P	Tennessee	
3*	100	New England Patriots	Nick Kaczur	G	Toledo	
3*	101	Denver Broncos	Maurice Clarett	RB	Ohio State	
4	102	Philadelphia Eagles	Sean Considine	S	Iowa	from San Francisco (Note: No. 102: San Francisco → Philadelphia (D). See No. 94: Philadelphia → San Francisco.)
4	103	Cleveland Browns	Antonio Perkins	CB	Oklahoma	
4	104	Miami Dolphins	Travis Daniels	CB	LSU	
4	105	Seattle Seahawks	Ray Willis	T	Florida State	from Oakland (Note: No. 105: Oakland → Seattle (D). See No. 23: Seattle → Oakland.)
4	106	Chicago Bears	Kyle Orton	QB	Purdue	
4	107	Tampa Bay Buccaneers	Dan Buenning	G	Wisconsin	
4	108	Tennessee Titans	Vincent Fuller	S	Virginia Tech	
4	109	Dallas Cowboys	Marion Barber ^{†}	RB	Minnesota	
4	110	New York Giants	Brandon Jacobs	RB	Southern Illinois	
4	111	Arizona Cardinals	Elton Brown	G	Virginia	
4	112	Minnesota Vikings	Ciatrick Fason	RB	Florida	from Washington (Note: No. 112: Washington → Minnesota (D). Washington traded a fourth-round selection (112th overall) to Minnesota in exchange for fourth- and fifth-round selections (120th and 154th overall).)
4	113	Tennessee Titans	David Stewart	T	Mississippi State	from Detroit (Note: No. 113: Detroit → Tennessee (D). See No. 37: Tennessee → Detroit.)
4	114	Houston Texans	Jerome Mathis ^{†}	WR	Hampton	
4	115	Green Bay Packers	Marviel Underwood	S	San Diego State	from Carolina (Note: No. 115: Carolina → Green Bay (D). See No. 89: Green Bay → Carolina.)
4	116	Kansas City Chiefs	Craphonso Thorpe	WR	Florida State	
4	117	St. Louis Rams	Jerome Carter	S	Florida State	
4	118	New Orleans Saints	Chase Lyman	WR	California	
4	119	Cincinnati Bengals	Eric Ghiaciuc	C	Central Michigan	
4	120	Washington Redskins	Manuel White	FB	UCLA	from Minnesota (Note: No. 120: Minnesota → Washington (D). See No. 112: Washington → Minnesota.)
4	121	Carolina Panthers	Stefan LeFors	QB	Louisville	from Seattle (Note: No. 121: Seattle → Carolina (D). See No. 45: Carolina → Seattle.)
4	122	Buffalo Bills	Duke Preston	C	Illinois	
4	123	New York Jets	Kerry Rhodes	S	Louisville	from Jacksonville (Note: No. 123: Jacksonville → NY Jets (D). Jacksonville traded a fourth-round selection (123rd overall) to the NY Jets in exchange for fourth- and sixth-round selections (127th and 185th overall).)
4	124	Baltimore Ravens	Jason Brown	C	North Carolina	
4	125	Green Bay Packers	Brady Poppinga	LB	BYU	
4	126	Philadelphia Eagles	Todd Herremans	T	Saginaw Valley State	from Denver via Cleveland, Seattle, Carolina and Green Bay (Note: No. 126: multiple trades: No. 126: Denver → Cleveland. Denver traded a fourth-round selection (126th overall) to Cleveland in exchange for DT Gerard Warren. No. 126: Cleveland → Seattle. Cleveland traded a fourth-round selection (126th overall) to Seattle in exchange for QB Trent Dilfer. No. 126: Seattle → Carolina. See No. 45: Carolina → Seattle. No. 126: Carolina → Green Bay. See No. 89: Green Bay → Carolina. No. 126: Green Bay → Philadelphia. Green Bay traded a fourth-round selection (126th overall) to Philadelphia in exchange for fifth-, sixth- and seventh-round selections (167th, 175th and 245th overall).)
4	127	Jacksonville Jaguars	Alvin Pearman	RB	Virginia	from NY Jets (Note: No. 127: NY Jets → Jacksonville (D). See No. 123: Jacksonville → NY Jets.)
4	128	Atlanta Falcons	Chauncey Davis	DE	Florida State	
4	129	Indianapolis Colts	Dylan Gandy	G	Texas Tech	
4	130	San Diego Chargers	Darren Sproles ^{†}	RB	Kansas State	
4	131	Pittsburgh Steelers	Fred Gibson	WR	Georgia	
4	132	Dallas Cowboys	Chris Canty	DE	Virginia	from Philadelphia (Note: No. 132: Philadelphia → Dallas. Philadelphia traded a fourth-round selection (132nd overall) and a 2006 sixth-round selection to Dallas in exchange for a fifth-round selection (148th overall) and a 2006 fourth-round selection.)
4	133	New England Patriots	James Sanders	S	Fresno State	
4*	134	St. Louis Rams	Claude Terrell	G	New Mexico	
4*	135	Indianapolis Colts	Matt Giordano	S	California	
4*	136	Tennessee Titans	Roydell Williams	WR	Tulane	
5	137	San Francisco 49ers	Ronald Fields	DT	Mississippi State	
5	138	Kansas City Chiefs	Boomer Grigsby	LB	Illinois State	from Miami (Note: No. 138: Miami → Kansas City (PD). See No. 46: Kansas City → Miami.)
5	139	Cleveland Browns	David McMillan	DE	Kansas	
5	140	Chicago Bears	Airese Currie	WR	Clemson	
5	141	Tampa Bay Buccaneers	Donte Nicholson	S	Oklahoma	
5	142	Tennessee Titans	Damien Nash	RB	Missouri	
5	143	Green Bay Packers	Junius Coston	C	North Carolina A&T	from Oakland (Note: No. 143: Oakland → Green Bay Oakland traded fifth- and sixth-round selections (143rd and 180th overall) to Green Bay in exchange for S Marques Anderson.)
5	144	St. Louis Rams	Jerome Collins	TE	Notre Dame	from NY Giants via San Diego and Tampa Bay (Note: No. 144: multiple trades: No. 144: NY Giants → San Diego (PD). See No. 12: NY Giants → San Diego. No. 144: San Diego → Tampa Bay (PD). San Diego traded a fifth-round selection (144th overall) to Tampa Bay in exchange for OT Roman Oben. No. 144: Tampa Bay → St. Louis (D). Tampa Bay traded a fifth-round selection (144th overall) to St. Louis in exchange for fifth- and seventh-round selections (155th and 231rd overall).)
5	145	Detroit Lions	Dan Orlovsky	QB	Connecticut	from Arizona via New England (Note: No. 145: multiple trades: No. 145: Arizona → New England (PD). See No. 95: New England → Arizona. No. 145: New England → Detroit (D). New England traded fifth- and sixth-round selections (145th and 206th overall) to Detroit in exchange for a 2006 fourth-round selection.)
5	146	Philadelphia Eagles	Trent Cole ^{†}	DE	Cincinnati	from Washington (Note: No. 146: Washington → Philadelphia Washington traded a fifth-round selection (146th overall) to Philadelphia in exchange for WR James Thrash.)
5	147	Kansas City Chiefs	Alphonso Hodge	CB	Miami (OH)	from Detroit (Note: No. 147: Detroit → Kansas City Detroit traded a fifth-round selection (147th overall) and 2004 second- and fourth-round selections to Kansas City in exchange for a 2004 first-round selection.)
5	148	Indianapolis Colts	Jonathan Welsh	DE	Wisconsin	from Dallas via Philadelphia (Note: No. 148: multiple trades: No. 148: Dallas → Philadelphia. See No. 132: Philadelphia → Dallas. No. 148: Philadelphia → Indianapolis. Philadelphia traded a fifth-round selection (148th overall) to Indianapolis in exchange for a 2006 fourth-round selection.)
5	149	Carolina Panthers	Adam Seward	LB	UNLV	
5	150	Tennessee Titans	Daniel Loper	T	Texas Tech	from Kansas City (Note: No. 150: Kansas City → Tennessee Kansas City traded a fifth-round selection (150th overall) to Tennessee in exchange for DE Carlos Hall.)
5	151	Houston Texans	Drew Hodgdon	C	Arizona State	
5	152	New Orleans Saints	Adrian McPherson	QB	Florida State	
5	153	Cincinnati Bengals	Adam Kieft	T	Central Michigan	
5	154	Washington Redskins	Robert McCune	LB	Louisville	from Minnesota (Note: No. 154: Minnesota → Washington (D). See No. 112: Washington → Minnesota.)
5	155	Tampa Bay Buccaneers	Larry Brackins	WR	Pearl River CC	from St. Louis (Note: No. 155: St. Louis → Tampa Bay (D). See No. 144: Tampa Bay → St. Louis.)
5	156	Buffalo Bills	Eric King	CB	Wake Forest	
5	157	Jacksonville Jaguars	Gerald Sensabaugh	S	North Carolina	
5	158	Baltimore Ravens	Justin Green	FB	Montana	
5	159	Seattle Seahawks	Jeb Huckeba	DE	Arkansas	
5	160	Atlanta Falcons	Michael Boley	LB	Southern Miss	from Denver (Note: No. 160: Denver → Atlanta Denver traded a fifth-round selection (160th overall) to Atlanta in exchange for DT Ellis Johnson.)
5	161	New York Jets	Andre Maddox	S	NC State	
5	162	Miami Dolphins	Anthony Alabi	T	TCU	from Green Bay via Kansas City (Note: No. 162: multiple trades: No. 162: Green Bay → Kansas City. Green Bay traded fifth- and sixth-round selections (162nd and 199th overall) to Kansas City in exchange for DE R-Kal Truluck. No. 162: Kansas City → Miami. See No. 46: Kansas City → Miami.)
5	163	Atlanta Falcons	Frank Omiyale	T	Tennessee Tech	
5	164	San Diego Chargers	Wesley Britt	T	Alabama	
5	165	Indianapolis Colts	Rob Hunt	C	North Dakota State	
5	166	Pittsburgh Steelers	Rian Wallace	LB	Temple	
5	167	Green Bay Packers	Mike Hawkins	CB	Oklahoma	from Philadelphia (Note: No. 167: Philadelphia → Green Bay. See No. 126: Green Bay → Philadelphia.)
5	168	Arizona Cardinals	Lance Mitchell	LB	Oklahoma	from New England (Note: No. 168: New England → Arizona. See No. 95: New England → Arizona.)
5*	169	Carolina Panthers	Geoff Hangartner	C	Texas A&M	
5*	170	New England Patriots	Ryan Claridge	LB	UNLV	
5*	171	Carolina Panthers	Ben Emanuel	S	UCLA	
5*	172	Philadelphia Eagles	Scott Young	T	BYU	
5*	173	Indianapolis Colts	Tyjuan Hagler	LB	Cincinnati	
5*	174	San Francisco 49ers	Rasheed Marshall	WR	West Virginia	
6	175	Oakland Raiders	Anttaj Hawthorne	DT	Wisconsin	from San Francisco via Philadelphia, Green Bay and New England (Note: No. 175: multiple trades: No. 175: San Francisco → Philadelphia. See No. 94: Philadelphia → San Francisco. No. 175: Philadelphia → Green Bay. See No. 126: Green Bay → Philadelphia. No. 175: Green Bay → New England. Green Bay traded a sixth-round selection (175th overall) to New England in exchange for sixth- and seventh-round selections (195th and 246th overall). No. 175: New England → Oakland. New England traded a sixth-round selection (175th overall) to Oakland in exchange for a seventh-round selection (230th overall) and a 2006 fifth-round selection.)
6	176	Cleveland Browns	Nick Speegle	LB	New Mexico	
6	177	San Diego Chargers	Wes Sims	T	Oklahoma	from Miami (Note: No. 177: Miami → San Diego Miami traded a sixth-round selection (177th overall) to San Diego in exchange for WR David Boston.)
6	178	Tampa Bay Buccaneers	Anthony Bryant	DT	Alabama	
6	179	Tennessee Titans	Bo Scaife	TE	Texas	
6	180	Green Bay Packers	Michael Montgomery	DE	Texas A&M	from Oakland (Note: No. 180: Oakland → Green Bay. See No. 143: Oakland → Green Bay.)
6	181	Chicago Bears	Chris Harris	S	Louisiana–Monroe	
6	182	New York Jets	Cedric Houston	RB	Tennessee	from Arizona via Oakland (Note: No. 182: multiple trades: No. 182: Arizona → Oakland (PD). Arizona traded a sixth-round selection (182nd overall) to Oakland in exchange for RB Troy Hambrick and DE Peppi Zellner. No. 182: Oakland → NY Jets (PD). See No. 26: NY Jets → Oakland.)
6	183	Washington Redskins	Jared Newberry	LB	Stanford	
6	184	Detroit Lions	Bill Swancutt	DE	Oregon State	
6	185	Jacksonville Jaguars	Chad Owens	WR	Hawaii	from Dallas via Oakland and NY Jets (Note: No. 185: multiple trades: No. 185: Dallas → Oakland (PD). Dallas traded a sixth-round selection (185th overall) and a 2004 seventh-round selection to Oakland in exchange for DE Kenyon Coleman. No. 185: Oakland → NY Jets (PD). See No. 26: NY Jets → Oakland. No. 185: NY Jets → Jacksonville (D). See No. 123: Jacksonville → NY Jets.)
6	186	New York Giants	Eric Moore	DE	Florida State	
6	187	Kansas City Chiefs	Will Svitek	G	Stanford	
6	188	Houston Texans	C. C. Brown	S	Louisiana–Lafayette	
6	189	Carolina Panthers	Jovan Haye	DE	Vanderbilt	
6	190	Cincinnati Bengals	Tab Perry	WR	UCLA	
6	191	Minnesota Vikings	C. J. Mosley	DT	Missouri	
6	192	St. Louis Rams	Dante Ridgeway	WR	Ball State	
6	193	New Orleans Saints	Jason Jefferson	DT	Wisconsin	
6	194	Jacksonville Jaguars	Pat Thomas	LB	NC State	
6	195	Green Bay Packers	Craig Bragg	WR	UCLA	from Baltimore via New England (Note: No. 195: multiple trades: No. 195: Baltimore → New England. See No. 64: New England → Baltimore. No. 195: New England → Green Bay. See No. 175: New England → Green Bay.)
6	196	Seattle Seahawks	Tony Jackson	TE	Iowa	
6	197	Buffalo Bills	Justin Geisinger	G	Vanderbilt	
6	198	New York Jets	Joel Dreessen	TE	Colorado State	
6	199	Kansas City Chiefs	Khari Long	DE	Baylor	from Green Bay (Note: No. 199: Green Bay → Kansas City. See No. 162: Green Bay → Kansas City.)
6	200	Denver Broncos	Chris Myers ^{†}	G	Miami (FL)	
6	201	Atlanta Falcons	DeAndra' Cobb	RB	Michigan State	
6	202	Indianapolis Colts	Dave Rayner	K	Michigan State	
6	203	Cleveland Browns	Andrew Hoffman	DT	Virginia	from Tampa Bay via San Diego (Note: No. 203: multiple trades: No. 203: San Diego → Tampa Bay (PD). See No. 91: San Diego → Tampa Bay. No. 203: Tampa Bay → Cleveland (D). Tampa Bay traded a sixth-round selection (203rd overall) to Cleveland in exchange for QB Luke McCown.)
6	204	Pittsburgh Steelers	Chris Kemoeatu	G	Utah	
6	205	San Francisco 49ers	Derrick Johnson	CB	Washington	from Philadelphia (Note: No. 205: Philadelphia → San Francisco Philadelphia traded a sixth-round selection (205th overall) and DE Brandon Whiting to San Francisco in exchange for WR Terrell Owens, and traded a 2004 fifth-round selection to Baltimore in exchange for Baltimore surrendering its rights to Owens.)
6	206	Detroit Lions	Johnathan Goddard	LB	Marshall	from New England (Note: No. 206: New England → Detroit (D). See No. 145: New England → Detroit.)
6*	207	Carolina Panthers	Joe Berger	G	Michigan Tech	
6*	208	Dallas Cowboys	Justin Beriault	S	Ball State	
6*	209	Dallas Cowboys	Rob Petitti	T	Pittsburgh	
6*	210	St. Louis Rams	Reggie Hodges	P	Ball State	
6*	211	Philadelphia Eagles	Calvin Armstrong	T	Washington State	
6*	212	Oakland Raiders	Ryan Riddle	DE	California	
6*	213	Baltimore Ravens	Derek Anderson ^{†}	QB	Oregon State	
6*	214	Oakland Raiders	Pete McMahon	T	Iowa	
7	215	San Francisco 49ers	Daven Holly	CB	Cincinnati	
7	216	Miami Dolphins	Kevin Vickerson	DT	Michigan State	
7	217	Cleveland Browns	Jon Dunn	T	Virginia Tech	
7	218	Tennessee Titans	Reynaldo Hill	CB	Florida	
7	219	Minnesota Vikings	Adrian Ward	CB	UTEP	from Oakland (Note: No. 219: Oakland → Minnesota (PD). See No. 7: Oakland → Minnesota.)
7	220	Chicago Bears	Rod Wilson	LB	South Carolina	
7	221	Tampa Bay Buccaneers	Rick Razzano	FB	Ole Miss	
7	222	Washington Redskins	Nehemiah Broughton	FB	The Citadel	
7	223	San Francisco 49ers	Marcus Maxwell	WR	Oregon	from Detroit (Note: No. 223: Detroit → San Francisco San Francisco received Detroit's seventh-round selection (223rd) as compensation for restricted free agent guard Kyle Kosier.)
7	224	Dallas Cowboys	Jay Ratliff ^{†}	DT	Auburn	
7	225	Tampa Bay Buccaneers	Paris Warren	WR	Utah	from NY Giants (Note: No. 225: NY Giants → Tampa Bay The NY Giants traded a seventh-round selection (225th overall) and G Jason Whittle to Tampa Bay in exchange for a 2006 sixth-round selection.)
7	226	Arizona Cardinals	LeRon McCoy	WR	IUP	
7	227	Houston Texans	Kenneth Pettway	LB	Grambling State	
7	228	Pittsburgh Steelers	Shaun Nua	DE	BYU	from Carolina (Note: No. 228: Carolina → Pittsburgh Carolina traded a seventh-round selection (228th overall) to Pittsburgh in exchange for OT Todd Fordham.)
7	229	Kansas City Chiefs	James Kilian	QB	Tulsa	
7	230	New England Patriots	Matt Cassel ^{†}	QB	USC	from Minnesota via NY Jets and Oakland (Note: No. 230: multiple trades: No. 230: Minnesota → NY Jets (PD). Minnesota traded a seventh-round selection (230th overall) to the NY Jets in exchange for LB Sam Cowart. No. 230: NY Jets → Oakland (PD). See No. 26: NY Jets → Oakland. No. 230: Oakland → New England (D). See No. 175: New England → Oakland.)
7	231	Tampa Bay Buccaneers	Hamza Abdullah	S	Washington State	from St. Louis (Note: No. 231: St. Louis → Tampa Bay (D). See No. 144: Tampa Bay → St. Louis.)
7	232	New Orleans Saints	Jimmy Verdon	DE	Arizona State	
7	233	Cincinnati Bengals	Jonathan Fanene	DE	Utah	
7	234	Baltimore Ravens	Mike Smith	LB	Texas Tech	
7	235	Seattle Seahawks	Cornelius Wortham	LB	Alabama	
7	236	Buffalo Bills	Lionel Gates	RB	Louisville	
7	237	Jacksonville Jaguars	Chris Roberson	CB	Eastern Michigan	
7	238	Kansas City Chiefs	Jeremy Parquet	T	Southern Miss	from Green Bay (Note: No. 238: Green Bay → Kansas City Green Bay traded a seventh-round selection (238th overall) to Kansas City in exchange for OT Jeremy Parquet.)
7	239	Denver Broncos	Paul Ernster	K	Northern Arizona	
7	240	New York Jets	Harry Williams	WR	Tuskegee	
7	241	Atlanta Falcons	Darrell Shropshire	DT	South Carolina	
7	242	San Diego Chargers	Scott Mruczkowski	C	Bowling Green	
7	243	Indianapolis Colts	Anthony Davis	RB	Wisconsin	
7	244	Pittsburgh Steelers	Noah Herron	RB	Northwestern	
7	245	Green Bay Packers	Kurt Campbell	S	Albany	from Philadelphia (Note: No. 245: Philadelphia → Green Bay. See No. 126: Green Bay → Philadelphia.)
7	246	Green Bay Packers	Will Whitticker	G	Michigan State	from New England (Note: No. 246: New England → Green Bay. See No. 175: Green Bay → New England.)
7*	247	Philadelphia Eagles	Keyonta Marshall	DT	Grand Valley State	
7*	248	San Francisco 49ers	Patrick Estes	TE	Virginia	
7*	249	San Francisco 49ers	Billy Bajema	TE	Oklahoma State	
7*	250	St. Louis Rams	Ryan Fitzpatrick	QB	Harvard	
7*	251	St. Louis Rams	Madison Hedgecock	FB	North Carolina	
7*	252	Philadelphia Eagles	David Bergeron	LB	Stanford	
7*	253	Tampa Bay Buccaneers	J. R. Russell	WR	Louisville	
7*	254	Seattle Seahawks	Doug Nienhuis	T	Oregon State	
7*	255	New England Patriots	Andy Stokes	TE	William Penn	

== Supplemental draft selections ==
For each player selected in the supplemental draft, the drafting team forfeited its pick in that round in the regular draft of the following season.

Rnd.	Pick	Team	Player	Pos.	College	Notes
5	—	Miami Dolphins	Manuel Wright	DT	USC	

== Notable undrafted players ==
†	= Pro Bowler

Original NFL team	Player	Pos.	College	Notes
Arizona Cardinals	John Bronson	TE	Penn State	
Arizona Cardinals	Adam Bergen	TE	Lehigh	
Arizona Cardinals	Tim Bulman	DE	Boston College	
Arizona Cardinals	Carlyle Holiday	WR	Notre Dame	
Arizona Cardinals	Aaron Francisco	S	BYU	
Atlanta Falcons	Michael Koenen	P	Western Washington	
Baltimore Ravens	Gary Gibson	DT	Rutgers	
Baltimore Ravens	Matt Katula	LS	Wisconsin	
Baltimore Ravens	Rhys Lloyd	K	Minnesota	
Buffalo Bills	Brad Cieslak	TE	Northern Illinois	
Buffalo Bills	Liam Ezekiel	LB	Northeastern	
Buffalo Bills	Jim Leonhard	S	Wisconsin	
Carolina Panthers	Lorenzo Alexander ^{†}	LB	California	
Chicago Bears	Brandon McGowan	S	Maine	
Cincinnati Bengals	Herana-Daze Jones	S	Indiana	
Cleveland Browns	Josh Cribbs ^{†}	WR	Kent State	
Cleveland Browns	Lance Moore	WR	Toledo	
Dallas Cowboys	Jon Condo ^{†}	LS	Maryland	
Dallas Cowboys	Tony Curtis	TE	Portland State	
Dallas Cowboys	Harvey Dahl	G	Nevada	
Dallas Cowboys	Tyson Thompson	RB	San Jose State	
Denver Broncos	Brandon Browner ^{†}	CB	Oregon State	
Denver Broncos	Erik Pears	T	Colorado State	
Detroit Lions	Cory Procter	T	Montana	
Green Bay Packers	Patrick Dendy	CB	Rice	
Green Bay Packers	Roy Manning	LB	Michigan	
Green Bay Packers	Leigh Torrence	CB	Stanford	
Green Bay Packers	Chris White	C	Southern Miss	
Houston Texans	Alfred Malone	DT	Troy	
Indianapolis Colts	Tory Humphrey	TE	Central Michigan	
Indianapolis Colts	Darrell Reid	LB	Minnesota	
Jacksonville Jaguars	Dan Connolly	G	Southeast Missouri State	
Jacksonville Jaguars	Andrew Economos	LS	Georgia Tech	
Jacksonville Jaguars	Derrick Wimbush	FB	Fort Valley State	
Kansas City Chiefs	Kris Griffin	LB	IUP	
Miami Dolphins	Brock Berlin	QB	Miami (FL)	
Miami Dolphins	John Denney ^{†}	DE	BYU	
Miami Dolphins	Abram Elam	S	Kent State	
Miami Dolphins	Atari Bigby	S	UCF	
Minnesota Vikings	Heath Farwell ^{†}	LB	San Diego State	
New England Patriots	Robbie Gould ^{†}	K	Penn State	
New Orleans Saints	L. P. Ladouceur ^{†}	LS	California	
New York Giants	Chase Blackburn	LB	Akron	
New York Giants	James Butler	S	Georgia Tech	
New York Giants	Ryan Grant	RB	Notre Dame	
New York Giants	Ahmad Treaudo	CB	Southern	
New York Giants	Cameron Wake ^{†}	DE	Penn State	
Oakland Raiders	Chris Carr	CB	Boise State	
Oakland Raiders	Hiram Eugene	S	Louisiana Tech	
Philadelphia Eagles	Jeremy Thornburg	S	Northern Arizona	
Pittsburgh Steelers	John Kuhn ^{†}	FB	Shippensburg	
Pittsburgh Steelers	Shaun Suisham	K	Bowling Green	
Pittsburgh Steelers	Greg Warren	LS	North Carolina	
Pittsburgh Steelers	Nate Washington	WR	Tiffin	
San Diego Chargers	Marques Harris	LB	Southern Utah	
San Diego Chargers	Derreck Robinson	LB	Iowa	
Seattle Seahawks	Chris Kluwe	P	UCLA	
Seattle Seahawks	Leonard Weaver ^{†}	FB	Carson–Newman	
Washington Redskins	Zak Keasey	FB	Princeton	
Washington Redskins	Nick Novak	K	Maryland	

== Hall of Famers ==
- DeMarcus Ware, linebacker from Troy taken 11th overall by the Dallas Cowboys, was inducted into the Pro Football Hall of Fame in 2023.

== Trades ==
In the explanations below, (PD) indicates trades completed prior to the start of the draft while (D) denotes trades that took place during the draft.

Round 1

Round 2

Round 3

Round 4

Round 5

Round 6

Round 7
