= 2003 All-Atlantic Coast Conference football team =

American college football all-star team

The 2003 All-Atlantic Coast Conference football team consists of American football players chosen by various selectors for their All-Atlantic Coast Conference ("ACC") teams for the 2003 college football season. Selectors in 2003 included the Associated Press (AP).

== Offensive selections ==
=== Wide receivers ===
- Jerricho Cotchery, NC State (AP-1)
- Craphonso Thorpe, Florida St. (AP-1)
- Jonathan Smith, Georgia Tech (AP-2)
- Derrick Hamilton, Clemson (AP-2)

=== Tackles ===
- Alex Barron, Florida St. (AP-1)
- Sean Locklear, NC State (AP-1)
- Mark Moroz, Wake Forest (AP-2)
- Gregory Walker, Clemson (AP-2)

=== Guards ===
- C. J. Brooks, Maryland (AP-1)
- Tyson Clabo, Wake Forest (AP-1)
- Elton Brown, Virginia (AP-2)
- Jeb Terry, North Carolina (AP-2)

=== Centers ===
- Hugh Reilly, Georgia Tech (AP-1)
- David Castillo, Florida St. (AP-2)

=== Tight ends ===
- Heath Miller, Virginia (AP-1)
- Jeff Dugan, Maryland (AP-2)

=== Quarterbacks ===
- Philip Rivers, NC State (AP-1)
- Matt Schaub, Virginia (AP-2)

=== Running backs ===
- Chris Douglas, Duke (AP-1)
- P. J. Daniels, Georgia Tech (AP-1)
- Chris Barclay, Wake Forest (AP-2)
- Wali Lundy, Virginia (AP-2)

== Defensive selections ==
=== Defensive linemen ===
- Darnell Dockett, Florida St. (AP-1)
- Eric Henderson, Georgia Tech (AP-1)
- Randy Starks, Maryland (AP-1)
- Matt Zielinski, Duke (AP-1)
- Eric Moore, Florida St. (AP-2)
- Chris Canty, Virginia (AP-2)
- Kevin Eli, Maryland (AP-2)
- Donnell Washington, Clemson (AP-2)

=== Linebackers ===
- Keyaron Fox, Georgia Tech (AP-1)
- Michael Boulware, Florida St. (AP-1)
- Leroy Hill, Clemson (AP-1)
- D'Qwell Jackson, Maryland (AP-2)
- Ryan Fowler, Duke (AP-2)
- Pat Thomas, NC State (AP-2)

=== Defensive backs ===
- James Butler, Georgia Tech (AP-1)
- Stanford Samuels Jr., Florida St. (AP-1)
- Eric King, Wake Forest (AP-1)
- Andre Maddox, NC State (AP-1)
- Dexter Reid, North Carolina (AP-2)
- Domonique Foxworth, Maryland (AP-2)
- Madieu Williams, Maryland (AP-2)
- Terrell Smith, Duke (AP-2)

== Special teams ==
=== Placekickers ===
- Nick Novak, Maryland (AP-1)
- Connor Hughes, Virginia (AP-2)

=== Punters ===
- Ryan Plackemeier, Wake Forest (AP-1)
- Adam Podlesh, Maryland (AP-2)

=== Return specialist ===
- Steve Suter, Maryland (AP-1)
- Derrick Hamilton, Clemson (AP-2)

== Key ==
AP = Associated Press

== See also ==
- 2003 College Football All-America Team
