= Eric King (American football) =

American football player (born 1982)

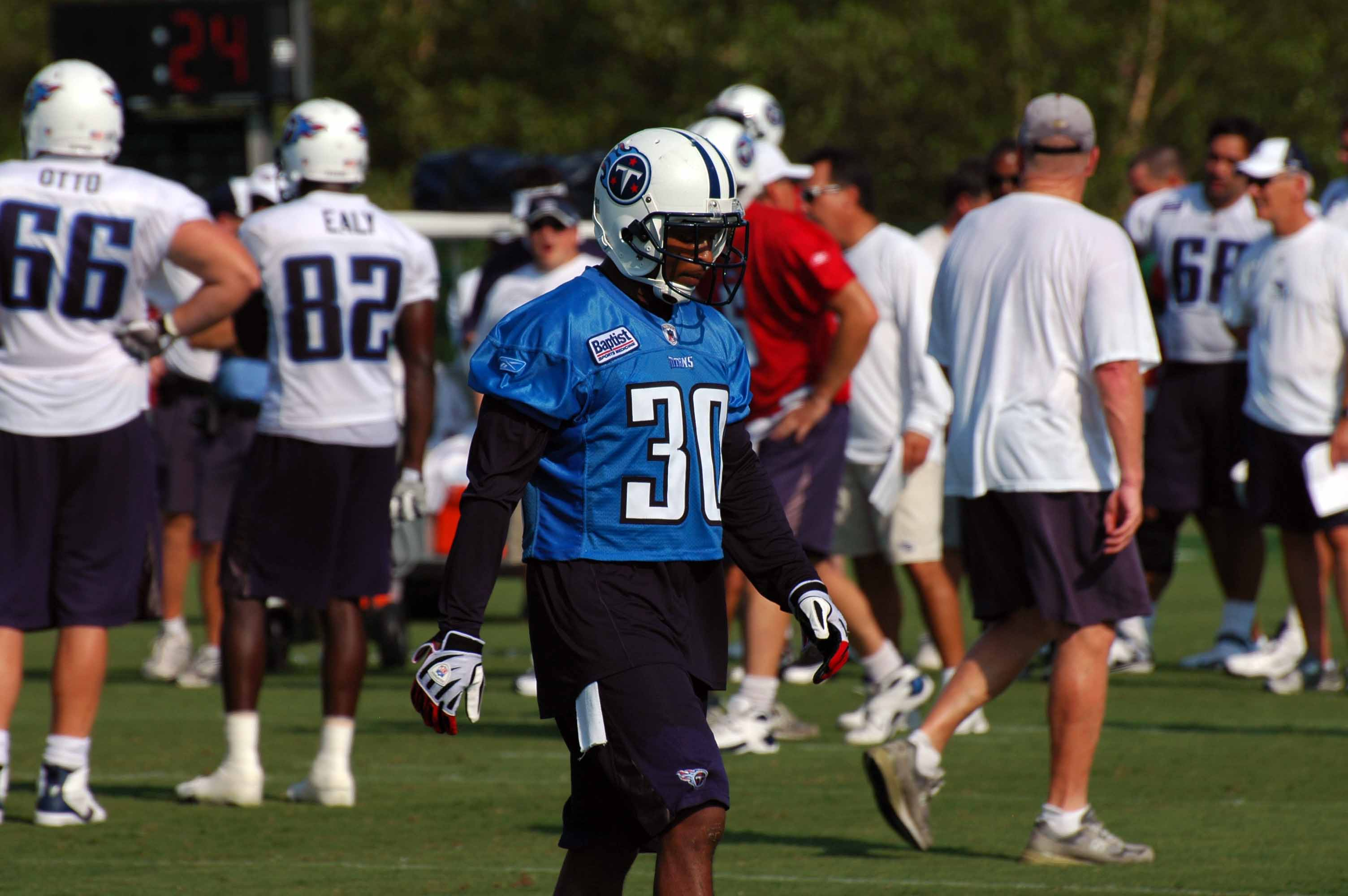
- King with the Tennessee Titans in 2008

No. 29, 30, 43
- Position: Cornerback

Personal information
- Born: May 10, 1982 (age 44); Baltimore, Maryland, U.S.
- Listed height: 5 ft 10 in (1.78 m)
- Listed weight: 190 lb (86 kg)

Career information
- High school: McDonogh School (Owings Mills, Maryland)
- College: Wake Forest
- NFL draft: 2005: 5th round, 156th overall pick

Career history
- Buffalo Bills (2005); Tennessee Titans (2006–2008); Detroit Lions (2009); Cleveland Browns (2010); Detroit Lions (2010)

Awards and highlights
- First-team All-ACC (2003); Second-team All-ACC (2004)

Career NFL statistics
- Total tackles: 82
- Pass deflections: 8
- Stats at Pro Football Reference

Eric King (born May 10, 1982) is an American former professional football player who was a cornerback in the National Football League (NFL). He was selected by the Buffalo Bills in the fifth round of the 2005 NFL draft. He played college football for the Wake Forest Demon Deacons. King has also played for the Tennessee Titans, Cleveland Browns and Detroit Lions.

== Early life ==
King attended McDonogh School in Owings Mills, Maryland, and was a three-sport letterman in football, basketball, and track. In football, he won first-team All-State honors, a first-team All-Metro honors, first-team All-County honors, and helped lead his team to four conference championships. As a senior, he had over 1,200 all-purpose yards on offense, and on defense, he added 5 interceptions, and 45 tackles. In basketball, he helped lead his team to three conference championships. In track, he was the private school champion in both the 100 meter dash and the long jump. Father, Eric King Sr. played basketball for the NAIA national champions Coppin State Eagles in the mid-1970s and professionally in Venezuela.

He spent a postgraduate year at The Hill School

== Professional career ==
King signed with the Cleveland Browns on November 16, 2010. He was cut by the Browns and picked up off waivers by the Detroit Lions on December 16, 2010. King was released by the Detroit Lions on February 10, 2011.
