= Alex Barron (American football) =

American football player (born 1982)

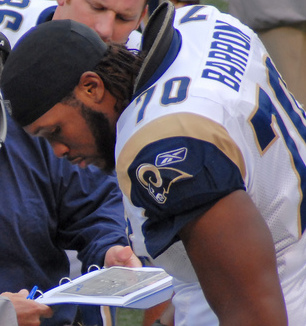
- Barron with the St. Louis Rams in 2008

No. 70, 71
- Position: Offensive tackle

Personal information
- Born: September 28, 1982 (age 44); Orangeburg, South Carolina, U.S.
- Listed height: 6 ft 8 in (2.03 m)
- Listed weight: 316 lb (143 kg)

Career information
- High school: Orangeburg-Wilkinson
- College: Florida State (2001–2004)
- NFL draft: 2005: 1st round, 19th overall pick

Career history
- St. Louis Rams (2005–2009); Dallas Cowboys (2010); New Orleans Saints (2011); Seattle Seahawks (2012)*; Oakland Raiders (2013)*
- * Offseason or practice squad member only

Awards and highlights
- Unanimous All-American (2004); Consensus All-American (2003); 2× First-team All-ACC (2003, 2004)

Career NFL statistics
- Games played: 87
- Games started: 75
- Stats at Pro Football Reference

Alex Benjamin Barron (born September 28, 1982) is an American former professional football player who was an offensive tackle in the National Football League (NFL). He was selected by the St. Louis Rams with the 19th overall pick of the 2005 NFL draft. He played college football for Florida State University, and was a two-time consensus All-American.

== Early life ==
Barron was born in Orangeburg, South Carolina. He attended Orangeburg-Wilkinson High School, and was a two-sport standout in football and basketball for the O-W Bruins.

In football, he was named a high school All-American by both PrepStar and Football News, ranked the No. 3 lineman in the nation by PrepStar, named to the All-South team by the Orlando Sentinel, and selected as Jeff Whittaker's Deep South Recruiting Guide South Carolina Player of the Year.

== College career ==
Barron accepted a football scholarship from Florida State University, where he played for coach Bobby Bowden's Florida State Seminoles football team from 2001 to 2004. As a redshirt freshman, he played in 4 games as a backup. As a sophomore, he appeared in 14 with five starts. As a junior, he started 12 games.

As a senior, he started all 13 games, allowing only five quarterback pressures and one sack, while contributing to the Seminoles gaining 4,470 offensive yards. He was also one of three finalists for the Outland Trophy.

Barron started 30 out of 43 career games at left tackle. He was a first-team All-Atlantic Coast Conference (ACC) selection in 2003 and 2004, and was recognized as a consensus first-team All-American in 2003 and a unanimous first-team All-American in 2004. He graduated from Florida State with a bachelor's degree in social science.

In 2016, he was inducted into the Florida State University Athletics Hall of Fame. He also has a permanent display in the Seminoles' locker room.

== Professional career ==
=== Pre-draft measurables ===
Pre-draft measurables
| Height | Weight | Arm length | Hand span | 40-yard dash | 20-yard shuttle | Three-cone drill | Vertical jump | Broad jump | Bench press | Wonderlic |
|---|---|---|---|---|---|---|---|---|---|---|
| 6 ft 7 1/2 in (2.02 m) | 320 lb (145 kg) | 37 3/4 in (0.96 m) | 10 1/4 in (0.26 m) | 4.87 s | 4.56 s | 7.83 s | 38.0 in (0.97 m) | 9 ft 4 in (2.84 m) | 21 reps | 19 |
All values from NFL Combine/Florida State Pro Day.

=== St. Louis Rams ===
Barron was selected by the St. Louis Rams in the first round (19th overall) of the 2005 NFL draft. On August 14, 2005, he signed a five-year, $9.2 million contract with the Rams with escalators that could take the value to over $11 million. The contract featured $5.5 million in guaranteed money, not including the signing bonus of $1 million. As a rookie, he was moved to right tackle, because the team had All-Pro Orlando Pace starting at left tackle. Barron passed Rex Tucker on the depth chart, starting 11 games, while making his pro debut against the Tennessee Titans and his first start against the New York Giants.

In 2007, he started 16 games at right tackle. He switched from right to left tackle against the San Francisco 49ers, after Pace was injured in Week 1.

In 2008, he started 15 of 16 games at right tackle, while contributing to running back Steven Jackson leading the league with an average of 118.4 yards from scrimmage. He was a part of an offensive line that allowed 45 sacks, the fewest by the Rams since 2003.

In 2009, he started 16 games at left tackle after Pace was released. He allowed 7 sacks and led the league with 7 holding penalties. In a 35–0 loss against the San Francisco 49ers, his poor play resulted in him being benched for the rest of the game, after getting an illegal formation penalty for lining up in the backfield. He contributed to Jackson rushing for more than 1,400 yards (most in the NFC).

In 2010, the Rams drafted offensive tackle Rodger Saffold to compete with Barron. On May 10, he was traded to the Dallas Cowboys, in exchange for another underwhelming former first round draft choice in linebacker Bobby Carpenter.

Barron had a disappointing career with the Rams, becoming notorious for his inconsistency, false starts and holding penalties. Although he was durable, starting 74 games at both left and right tackle, he struggled with penalties and poor blocking. He committed 43 false start penalties (13 in 2006), 13 holding penalties and allowed 33 sacks. Such poor play after having been a first round draft has led to him being labeled as a bust among Ram fans.

=== Dallas Cowboys ===
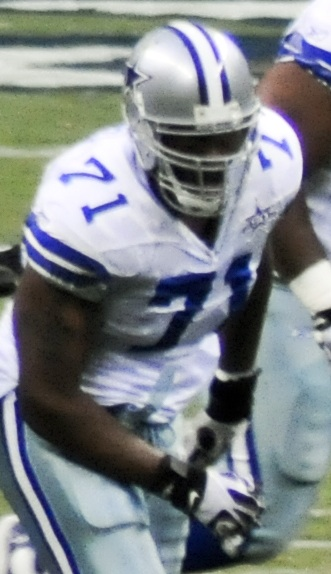
Barron with the Cowboys in 2011

In 2010, he was acquired to provide depth and compete with Doug Free for the left tackle position, after the release of Flozell Adams. He got off to an inauspicious beginning, in his first game and start at right tackle in place of an injured Marc Colombo, the Cowboys appeared to have come back from a 13–7 deficit on a touchdown pass from Tony Romo to Roy Williams on the final play against the Washington Redskins on the season opener. However, Barron was flagged for holding defensive end Brian Orakpo and because the penalty was called against the offense, the game was over with the Cowboys losing. Although he was active for 10 additional games, he would not play another down and was not re-signed at the end of the year.

=== New Orleans Saints ===
On August 3, 2011, Barron signed with the New Orleans Saints. On August 18, he was put on the injured reserve list. He was waived with an injury settlement on October 22.

=== Seattle Seahawks ===
On May 15, 2012, he signed as a free agent with the Seattle Seahawks, after having a tryout with the team during rookie minicamp. He was cut on August 26.

=== Oakland Raiders ===
On March 26, 2013, Barron signed with the Oakland Raiders, to provide depth after starter Jared Veldheer suffered a torn left triceps. On September 2, he was released to make room on the roster for offensive tackle Tony Pashos.
