= 2004 All-Atlantic Coast Conference football team =

American college football all-star team

The 2004 All-Atlantic Coast Conference football team consists of American football players chosen by various selectors for their All-Atlantic Coast Conference ("ACC") teams for the 2004 college football season. Selectors in 2004 included the Associated Press (AP).

== Offensive selections ==
=== Wide receivers ===
- Airese Currie, Clemson (AP-1)
- Calvin Johnson, Georgia Tech (AP-1)
- Chauncey Stovall, Florida St. (AP-2)
- Roscoe Parrish, Miami (AP-2)

=== Tackles ===
- Alex Barron, Florida St. (AP-1)
- D'Brickashaw Ferguson, Virginia (AP-1)
- Chris Myers, Miami (AP-2)
- Jon Dunn, Virginia Tech (AP-2)

=== Guards ===
- Elton Brown, Virginia (AP-1)
- C. J. Brooks, Maryland (AP-1)
- Steve Vallos, Wake Forest (AP-2)
- Kyle Ralph, North Carolina (AP-2)

=== Centers ===
- Jason Brown, North Carolina (AP-1)
- Zac Yarbrough, Virginia (AP-2)

=== Tight ends ===
- Heath Miller, Virginia (AP-1)
- Jeff King, Virginia Tech (AP-2)

=== Quarterbacks ===
- Bryan Randall, Virginia Tech (AP-1)
- Brock Berlin, Miami (AP-2)

=== Running backs ===
- Alvin Pearman, Virginia (AP-1)
- Chris Barclay, Wake Forest (AP-1)
- Frank Gore, Miami (AP-2)
- Leon Washington, Florida St. (AP-2)

== Defensive selections ==
=== Defensive linemen ===
- Darryl Tapp, Virginia Tech (AP-1)
- Shawne Merriman, Maryland (AP-1)
- Travis Johnson, Florida St. (AP-1)
- Mario Williams, NC State (AP-1)
- Manny Lawson, NC State (AP-2)
- Jim Davis, Virginia Tech (AP-2)
- Eric Henderson, Georgia Tech (AP-2)
- Chauncey Davis, Florida St. (AP-2)

=== Linebackers ===
- D'Qwell Jackson, Maryland (AP-1)
- Leroy Hill, Clemson (AP-1)
- Ahmad Brooks, Virginia (AP-1)
- Darryl Blackstock, Virginia (AP-2)
- Gerris Wilkinson, Georgia Tech (AP-2)
- Ernie Sims, Florida St. (AP-2)

=== Defensive backs ===
- Antrel Rolle, Miami (AP-1)
- Jimmy Williams, Virginia Tech (AP-1)
- James Butler, Georgia Tech (AP-1)
- Antonio Cromartie, Florida St. (AP-1)
- John Talley, Duke (AP-2)
- Eric King, Wake Forest (AP-2)
- Bryant McFadden, Florida St. (AP-2)
- Domonique Foxworth, Maryland (AP-2)
- Justin Miller, Clemson (AP-2)

== Special teams ==
=== Placekickers ===
- Brandon Pace, Virginia Tech (AP-1)
- Travis Bell, Georgia Tech (AP-2)

=== Punters ===
- Ryan Plackemeier, Wake Forest (AP-1)
- Adam Podlesh, Maryland (AP-2)

=== Return specialist ===
- Devin Hester, Miami (AP-1)
- Justin Miller, Clemson (AP-2)

== Key ==
AP = Associated Press

== See also ==
- 2004 College Football All-America Team
