= Eric Henderson =

American football player and coach (born 1983)

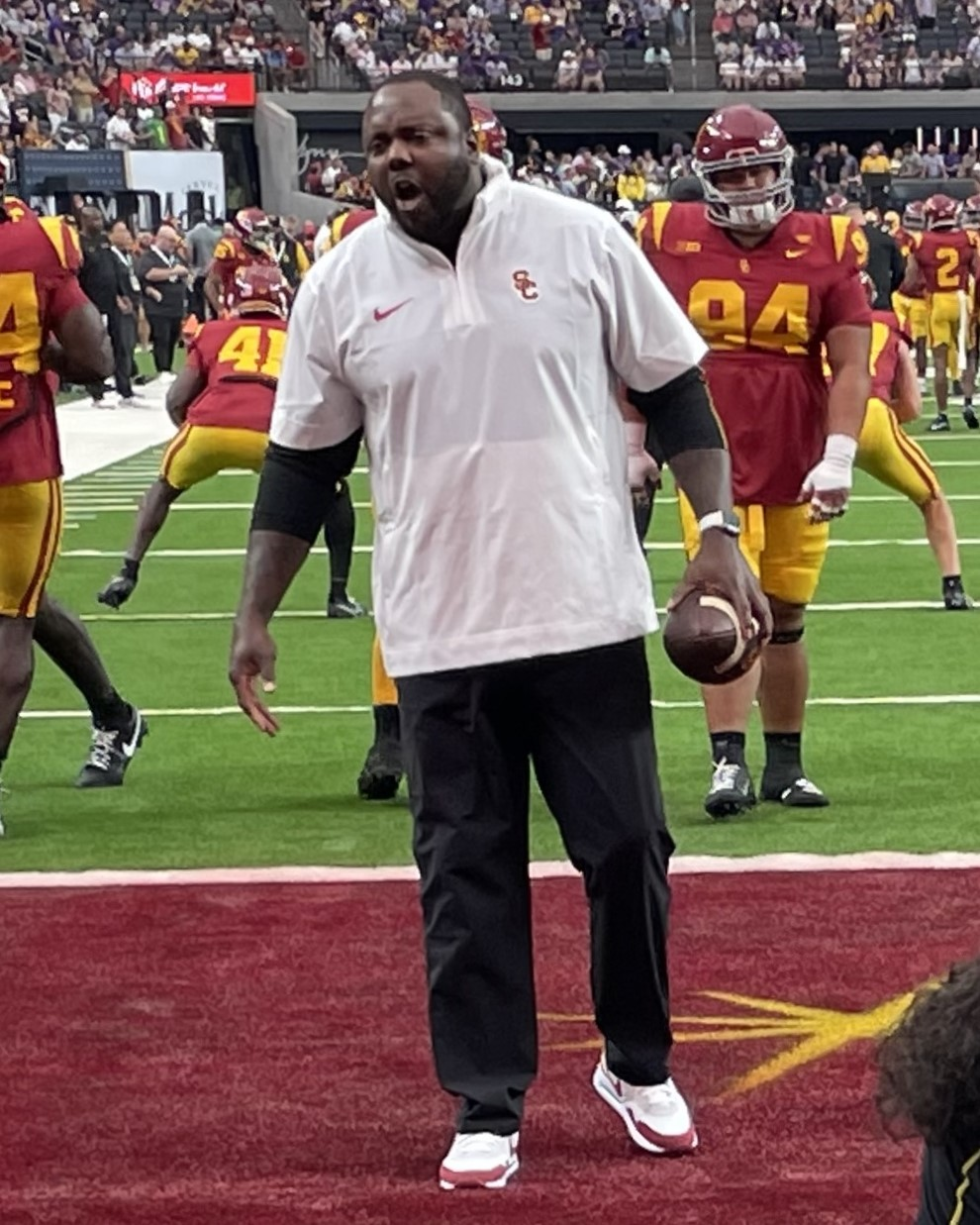
- Henderson coaching the USC Trojans in 2024

Washington Commanders
- Title: Defensive line coach/run game coordinator

Personal information
- Born: January 8, 1983 (age 43); New Orleans, Louisiana, U.S.
- Listed height: 6 ft 2 in (1.88 m)
- Listed weight: 256 lb (116 kg)

Career information
- Position: Defensive end
- High school: Edna Karr (New Orleans)
- College: Georgia Tech (2002–2005)
- NFL draft: 2006: undrafted

Career history

Playing
- Cincinnati Bengals (2006–2008); Las Vegas Locomotives (2009)

Coaching
- Georgia Military Bulldogs (2012) Outside linebackers coach; Oklahoma State Cowboys (2013–2015) Graduate assistant; UTSA Roadrunners (2016) Defensive line coach; Los Angeles Chargers (2017–2018) Assistant defensive line coach; Los Angeles Rams (2019–2023); Defensive line coach (2019–2020); Defensive line coach & run game coordinator (2021–2023); USC Trojans (2024–2025) Co-defensive coordinator & defensive line coach; Washington Commanders (2026–present) Defensive line coach/run game coordinator

Awards and highlights
- Coaching: Super Bowl champion (LVI); Playing: 2× UFL champion (2009, 2010); First-team All-ACC (2003); 2× second-team All-ACC (2004, 2005)

Career NFL statistics
- Tackles: 2
- Stats at Pro Football Reference

Eric Charles Henderson (born January 8, 1983) is an American professional football coach who is the defensive line coach and run game coordinator for the Washington Commanders of the National Football League (NFL). Henderson played college football as a defensive end for the Georgia Tech Yellow Jackets and was signed by the NFL's Cincinnati Bengals as an undrafted free agent in 2006. He also played for the Las Vegas Locomotives of the United Football League (UFL), winning two UFL championships.

== Playing career ==
=== College ===
While playing for the Georgia Tech Yellow Jackets, Henderson set a team career record with 59.5 tackles-for-loss (TFL), and he ranks fourth in school history in sacks (25). He had a breakout sophomore season in 2003, starting all 13 games and earning first-team All-Atlantic Coast Conference honors with 11 sacks and 24 TFL. He earned second-team All-ACC nods as both a junior and a senior. As a senior, he led the team with six sacks, despite missing four games with an ankle injury, and caused four fumbles on those sacks. He helped the Tech defense rank in the Top 25 nationally in seven categories in 2005, and he was a key performer as Tech upset No. 3 Miami, holding the Hurricanes to 30 yards rushing. In his first game back from his ankle injury in 2005, he played a key role in a 10–9 win over Clemson and was named ACC Defensive Lineman of the Week for the third time in his career. He played four seasons at Georgia Tech (2002–05), with a redshirt year in 2001.

=== Cincinnati Bengals ===
Pre-draft measurables
Height	Weight	Arm length	Hand span	Bench press
6 ft 1 7/8 in (1.88 m)	270 lb (122 kg)	32 5/8 in (0.83 m)	9 7/8 in (0.25 m)	30 reps
All values from NFL Combine

On May 9, 2006, Henderson signed as an undrafted free agent with the NFL's Cincinnati Bengals. He spent his rookie season on the practice squad. On January 2, 2007, he was signed to Bengals offseason roster. Henderson spent the first seven weeks of the 2008 season on the Bengals' practice squad. He was signed to the active roster on October 24, 2008. On December 10, 2008, Henderson was placed on injured reserve with a neck injury. He finished the 2008 season with two tackles in two games. Henderson was released on April 27, 2009.

=== Las Vegas Locomotives ===
Following his NFL career, Henderson spent three seasons (2009–11) with the Las Vegas Locomotives of the United Football League (UFL), helping the team win league championships in 2009 and 2010.

== Coaching career ==
=== Georgia Military College ===
In 2012, Henderson segued into coaching as a defensive assistant at Georgia Military College, where he worked with the outside linebackers and secondary. Henderson helped coach the Bulldogs to a 7–4 record and an appearance in the C.H.A.M.P.S. Heart of Texas Bowl.

=== Oklahoma State ===
In 2013, Henderson moved on to Oklahoma State, where he spent two seasons (2013–14) as a graduate assistant and a third (2015) as a defensive quality control coach. During his three years in Stillwater, the Cowboys went 27-12 and made three bowl appearances. Henderson helped tutor defensive end Emmanuel Ogbah, who earned All-America accolades; was named Big 12 Conference Defensive Player of the Year in 2015, and was drafted in the second round of the 2016 NFL draft (32nd overall) by the Cleveland Browns.

=== UTSA ===
Henderson spent the 2016 season as the defensive line coach at Texas-San Antonio. The Roadrunners went 6-6 during the regular season before facing New Mexico in the Gildan New Mexico Bowl.

=== Los Angeles Chargers ===
In 2017, Henderson was hired the Los Angeles Chargers to serve as their assistant defensive line coach under head coach Anthony Lynn. During his two seasons with the Chargers, he worked with Pro Bowl defensive ends Joey Bosa and Melvin Ingram.

=== Los Angeles Rams ===
In 2019, Henderson was hired by the Los Angeles Rams to serve as their defensive line coach under head coach Sean McVay. In February 2021, Henderson was named run game coordinator while retaining his defensive line coaching duties. Henderson became a Super Bowl champion when the Rams defeated the Cincinnati Bengals in Super Bowl LVI.

=== USC ===
On January 15, 2024, Henderson was hired by the USC Trojans as co-defensive coordinator, run game coordinator, and defensive line coach under head coach Lincoln Riley.

=== Washington Commanders ===
On February 10, 2026, Henderson joined the Washington Commanders as their defensive line coach and run game coordinator.

== Personal life ==
While at Georgia Tech, Henderson earned a bachelor's degree in management and is working toward a master's degree in educational psychology. He is married with one daughter.
