= Andrew Hoffman (American football) =

American football player (born 1982)

Profile
- Position: Defensive tackle

Personal information
- Born: February 15, 1982 (age 44); Fairfax, Virginia, U.S.
- Listed height: 6 ft 4 in (1.93 m)
- Listed weight: 296 lb (134 kg)

Career information
- College: Virginia
- NFL draft: 2005: 6th round, 203rd overall pick

Career history
- 2005–2006: Cleveland Browns

Andrew Hoffman (born February 15, 1982) is an American former professional football defensive tackle who played for the University of Virginia and was on the practice squad of the Cleveland Browns during the 2005 and 2006 seasons in the National Football League (NFL). He was selected by the Browns in the sixth round of the 2005 NFL draft.

== College career ==
Hoffman was at the University of Virginia from 2000 through 2004, and he started in all but one game from 2002 to 2004. His senior year in 2004 was his best season, earning an honorable mention on the "All ACC team" and praise from head coach Al Groh as the best player on the defense.
