= Harry Williams (American football) =

American football player (born 1982)

Personal information
- Born: August 10, 1982 (age 44); Augusta, Georgia, U.S.
- Listed height: 6 ft 3 in (1.91 m)
- Listed weight: 185 lb (84 kg)

Career information
- High school: Jackson-Olin (AL)
- College: Tuskegee
- NFL draft: 2005: 7th round, 240th overall pick

Career history

Playing
- New York Jets (2005); Green Bay Packers (2006)*; New York Giants (2006)*; Chicago Bears (2006)*; Houston Texans (2006–2008); → Amsterdam Admirals (2007)
- * Offseason or practice squad member only

Coaching
- Prairie View A&M (2009–2010) Volunteer assistant; Prairie View A&M (2011–2014) Wide receivers coach; Langston (2015) Quarterbacks coach; Morehouse (2021) Offensive coordinator; Alabama State (2022–2023) Offensive coordinator; Tuskegee (2024–2025) Associate head coach & offensive coordinator

Career NFL statistics
- Games played: 3
- Total tackles: 2
- Stats at Pro Football Reference

Harry Williams Jr. (born August 10, 1982) is an American college football coach and former wide receiver. He most recently served as the associate head football coach and offensive coordinator for Tuskegee University, positions he has held from 2024 to 2025. He was drafted by the New York Jets in the seventh round of the 2005 NFL draft with the 240th overall pick. He played college football at Tuskegee. While at Tuskegee Harry Williams was initiated into the Lambda Epsilon chapter of Omega Psi Phi fraternity in the Fall of 2002.

Williams was also a member of the Green Bay Packers, New York Giants, Chicago Bears and Houston Texans.

== Early life ==
Williams attended Jackson-Olin High School in Birmingham, Alabama, and was a two-sport star in both football and track. In track, he competed in the 100 meter dash and the 200 meter dash.

== Professional career ==
On August 22, 2008, Williams suffered a neck injury in a preseason game against the Dallas Cowboys. He was taken off the field on a stretcher immobilized. Afterward, he recovered from paralysis, with team doctors reporting his condition was "almost normal." He underwent surgery and walked on his own at the hospital August 28, 2008; however, returning to football is unlikely.
