= Andre Maddox =

American gridiron football player (born 1982)

No. 36
- Positions: Linebacker, Safety

Personal information
- Born: October 8, 1982 (age 44); Miami, Florida, U.S.
- Listed height: 6 ft 1 in (1.85 m)
- Listed weight: 206 lb (93 kg)

Career information
- College: North Carolina State
- NFL draft: 2005: 5th round, 161st overall pick

Career history
- 2005–2006: New York Jets
- 2007: Minnesota Vikings*
- 2008: Toronto Argonauts
- * Offseason or practice squad member only

Awards and highlights
- First-team All-ACC (2003)

Andre Maddox (born October 8, 1982) is an American former professional football safety.

== Professional career ==
Maddox was selected in the fifth round of the 2005 NFL draft by the New York Jets with the 161st overall pick. He was reunited with college teammate Jerricho Cotchery, who had been drafted by the Jets the previous year. However, he suffered a torn anterior cruciate ligament in training camp his rookie year. Maddox was released by the team on September 2, 2006, following training camp, and was later added to the Jets' practice squad on December 13.

He signed with the Minnesota Vikings and was allocated to play for the Rhein Fire of NFL Europa. On April 3, 2008, Maddox signed with the Toronto Argonauts of the Canadian Football League.

== Personal life ==
He spoke at the funeral for his longtime friend and high school teammate, Sean Taylor.
