= Terry Butler (American football) =

American football player (born 1982)

No. 27
- Position: Running back

Personal information
- Born: August 2, 1982 (age 44); Syracuse, New York, U.S.
- Listed height: 6 ft 1 in (1.85 m)
- Listed weight: 205 lb (93 kg)

Career information
- High school: Henninger (Syracuse)
- College: Villanova (2001–2004)
- NFL draft: 2005: undrafted

Career history
- New York Jets (2005–2006); → Cologne Centurions (2006)

Career NFL statistics
- Games played: 1
- Tackles: 1
- Stats at Pro Football Reference

Terry Butler (born August 2, 1982) is an American former professional football running back who played in the National Football League (NFL) for the New York Jets. He played college football for the Villanova Wildcats. Butler also had a stint in NFL Europe with Cologne Centurions.

== Early life ==
Butler was born on August 2, 1982, in Syracuse, New York. He attended Henninger High School in Syracuse.

== College career ==
Butler played college football for the Villanova Wildcats from 2001 to 2004 and was a four-year letterman. As a three-year starter, he had 2,080 rushing yards and 17 touchdowns to go with 70 receptions for 717 yards and five touchdowns.

== Professional career ==
=== New York Jets ===
After going undrafted in the 2005 NFL draft, Butler signed with the New York Jets as an undrafted free agent. On September 3, he was waived by the team. Butler was signed and released from the Jets four times throughout the 2005 season but played in one game, recording one tackle on special teams against the Miami Dolphins in week 14.

January 3, 2006, Butler was re-signed by the team. On August 28, he was released.

=== Cologne Centurions ===
In 2006, Butler was allocated to the Cologne Centurions of NFL Europe. He played in four games, where he rushed for 89 yards and one touchdown with one catch for two yards.
