= Jon Dunn =

American football player (born 1981)

Jonathan Dunn
No. 71, 77
- Position: Offensive tackle

Personal information
- Born: December 12, 1981 (age 44); Norfolk, Virginia, U.S.
- Listed height: 6 ft 7 in (2.01 m)
- Listed weight: 324 lb (147 kg)

Career information
- High school: Tallwood (Virginia Beach, Virginia)
- College: Virginia Tech
- NFL draft: 2005: 7th round, 217th overall pick

Career history
- Cleveland Browns (2005); New York Giants (2006–2007)*; Hamburg Sea Devils (2006); Detroit Lions (2007–2008)*
- * Offseason or practice squad member only

Awards and highlights
- Second-team All-ACC (2004)

Jonathan Paul Dunn (born December 12, 1981) is an American former professional football offensive tackle. He was selected by the Cleveland Browns in the seventh round of the 2005 NFL draft. He played college football at Virginia Tech.

Dunn was also a member of the New York Giants and Detroit Lions.

== Early life ==
Dunn attended Tallwood High School in Virginia Beach, Virginia. He earned All-America honors from SuperPrep, Prep Star and Tom Lemming's Prep Football Report as a senior and was rated the No. 35 offensive line prospect in the nation by SuperPrep and the ninth-best player in Virginia. Listed as the best offensive lineman in the state and the seventh-best overall prospect in Virginia by The Roanoke Times. Lettered three seasons in football and saw most of his action as an offensive tackle. Also received some playing time at defensive tackle and as a long snapper. Earned all-district honors his junior and senior seasons and was named all-eastern region in his final year. Had eight tackles and two sacks in limited defensive duty in 1999.

== College career ==
Dunn worked at right tackle with the scout team while redshirting in 2000 at Virginia Tech. He played in ten games as a redshirt freshman in 2001, seeing action on offense in nine of those contests. He played in every game in 2002, starting seven contests at the right tackle position. Dunn collected 22 knockdowns and graded 80.3 percent for blocking consistency that campaign. In 2003, he started all 12 games he played in, missing the Central Florida game. Dunn would go on to register 23 knockdown blocks and grade 83 percent while participating in 716 plays that year. As a senior, he earned second-team All-Atlantic Coast Conference honors. He again lined up at right tackle, making a career-high 34 knockdowns. Dunn was on the field for 793 plays as a senior and received an 82 percent grade for blocking consistency.
