= David McMillan (American football) =

American football player (1981–2013)

No. 92, 90
- Position: Defensive end

Personal information
- Born: September 20, 1981; Hinesville, Georgia, U.S.
- Died: May 18, 2013 (aged 31); Atlanta, Georgia, U.S.
- Listed height: 6 ft 3 in (1.91 m)
- Listed weight: 250 lb (113 kg)

Career information
- High school: Killeen (Killeen, Texas)
- College: Kansas
- NFL draft: 2005: 5th round, 139th overall pick

Career history
- Cleveland Browns (2005–2007); Toronto Argonauts (2009)*
- * Offseason or practice squad member only

Awards and highlights
- First-team All-Big 12 (2004)

Career NFL statistics
- Total tackles: 8
- Fumble recoveries: 1
- Stats at Pro Football Reference

David McMillan (September 20, 1981 – May 18, 2013) was an American professional football defensive end. He was selected by the Cleveland Browns in the fifth round of the 2005 NFL draft. He played college football for the Kansas Jayhawks.

== College career ==
McMillan started 37 of 46 games at defensive end for the University of Kansas and collected 150 tackles with 15 sacks, 30 stops for losses, 19 quarterback pressures, five forced fumbles, 2 fumble recoveries, and 2 interceptions.

== Professional career ==
=== Cleveland Browns ===
McMillan was selected by the Browns in the fifth round (139th overall) of the 2005 NFL draft. He was waived by the Browns on August 30, 2008, prior to the 2008 season

=== Toronto Argonauts ===
McMillan was signed by the Toronto Argonauts on April 9, 2009, and was cut at the end of training camp.

== Death ==
McMillan was shot and killed in an apparent robbery attempt in Georgia in May 2013.
