= 2005–06 NFL playoffs =

American football tournament

- Dates: January 7 – February 5, 2006
- Season: 2005
- Teams: 12
- Games played: 11
- Super Bowl XL site: Ford Field; Detroit, Michigan
- Defending champions: New England Patriots
- Champion: Pittsburgh Steelers (5th title)
- Runner-up: Seattle Seahawks
- Conference runners-up: Carolina Panthers; Denver Broncos
NFL playoffs
← 2004–05	2006–07 →

The National Football League playoffs for the 2005 season began on January 7, 2006. The postseason tournament concluded with the Pittsburgh Steelers defeating the Seattle Seahawks in Super Bowl XL, 21–10, on February 5, at Ford Field in Detroit, Michigan.

After scrutiny in the Wild Card and Divisional rounds, the league reversed a two-year policy, and returned to "all star" officiating crews for the Conference Championship games. Since the 2003–04 NFL playoffs, postseason officiating had been done by entire crews from the regular season. Nevertheless, the officiating in Super Bowl XL would be met with criticism.

== Participants ==
Within each conference, the four division winners and the top two non-division winners with the best overall regular season records) qualified for the playoffs. The four division winners are seeded 1–4 based on their overall won-lost-tied record, and the wild card teams are seeded 5–6. The NFL does not use a fixed bracket playoff system, and there are no restrictions regarding teams from the same division matching up in any round. In the first round, dubbed the wild-card playoffs or wild-card weekend, the third-seeded division winner hosts the sixth-seed wild card, and the fourth seed hosts the fifth. The 1 and 2 seeds from each conference received a first-round bye. In the second round, the divisional playoffs, the number 1 seed hosts the worst-surviving seed from the first round (seed 4, 5, or 6), while the number 2 seed will play the other team (seed 3, 4, or 5). The two surviving teams from each conference's divisional playoff games met in the respective AFC and NFC Conference Championship games, hosted by the higher seed. Although the Super Bowl, the championship round of the playoffs, is played at a neutral site, the designated home team is based on an annual rotation by conference.

Playoff seeds
Seed	AFC	NFC
1	Indianapolis Colts (South winner)	Seattle Seahawks (West winner)
2	Denver Broncos (West winner)	Chicago Bears (North winner)
3	Cincinnati Bengals (North winner)	Tampa Bay Buccaneers (South winner)
4	New England Patriots (East winner)	New York Giants (East winner)
5	Jacksonville Jaguars (wild card)	Carolina Panthers (wild card)
6	Pittsburgh Steelers (wild card)	Washington Redskins (wild card)

== Bracket ==
Jan 8 – Giants Stadium	Jan 15 – Soldier Field
5	Carolina	23
5	Carolina	29
4	NY Giants	0	Jan 22 – Qwest Field
2	Chicago	21
NFC
Jan 7 – Raymond James Stadium	5	Carolina	14
Jan 14 – Qwest Field
1	Seattle	34
6	Washington	17	NFC Championship
6	Washington	10
3	Tampa Bay	10	Feb 5 – Ford Field
1	Seattle	20
Wild Card playoffs
Divisional playoffs
Jan 8 – Paul Brown Stadium	N1	Seattle	10
Jan 15 – RCA Dome
A6	Pittsburgh	21
6	Pittsburgh	31	Super Bowl XL
6	Pittsburgh	21
3	Cincinnati	17	Jan 22 – Invesco Field at Mile High
1	Indianapolis	18
AFC
Jan 7 – Gillette Stadium	6	Pittsburgh	34
Jan 14 – Invesco Field at Mile High
2	Denver	17
5	Jacksonville	3	AFC Championship
4	New England	13
4	New England	28
2	Denver	27

== Schedule ==
These playoffs marked the final season that ABC televised the first two Wild Card playoff games. Super Bowl XL was also ABC's final Super Bowl telecast. In addition to taking over Sunday Night Football during the following season, NBC was awarded the first two Wild Card playoff games, as well as ABC's place in the annual Super Bowl broadcasting rotation. ABC would not broadcast a playoff game again until the 2015–16 playoffs when it started to simulcast the ESPN-produced Wild Card Game.

CBS continued to televise the rest of the AFC playoff games and Fox the rest of the NFC games.

Round	Away team	Score	Home team	Date	Kickoff (ET / UTC−5)	TV
Wild-card round	Washington Redskins	17–10	Tampa Bay Buccaneers	January 7, 2006	4:30 p.m.	ABC
Wild-card round	Jacksonville Jaguars	3–28	New England Patriots	January 7, 2006	8:00 p.m.	ABC
Wild-card round	Carolina Panthers	23–0	New York Giants	January 8, 2006	1:00 p.m.	Fox
Wild-card round	Pittsburgh Steelers	31–17	Cincinnati Bengals	January 8, 2006	4:30 p.m.	CBS
Divisional round	Washington Redskins	10–20	Seattle Seahawks	January 14, 2006	4:30 p.m.	Fox
Divisional round	New England Patriots	13–27	Denver Broncos	January 14, 2006	8:00 p.m.	CBS
Divisional round	Pittsburgh Steelers	21–18	Indianapolis Colts	January 15, 2006	1:00 p.m.	CBS
Divisional round	Carolina Panthers	29–21	Chicago Bears	January 15, 2006	4:30 p.m.	Fox
Conference championships	Pittsburgh Steelers	34–17	Denver Broncos	January 22, 2006	3:00 p.m.	CBS
Conference championships	Carolina Panthers	14–34	Seattle Seahawks	January 22, 2006	6:30 p.m.	Fox
Super Bowl XL Ford Field Detroit, Michigan	Seattle Seahawks	10–21	Pittsburgh Steelers	February 5, 2006	6:30 p.m.	ABC

== Wild-card round ==
=== Saturday, January 7, 2006 ===
==== NFC: Washington Redskins 17, Tampa Bay Buccaneers 10 ====
Washington Redskins vs. Tampa Bay Buccaneers – Game summary

Quarter	1	2	3	4	Total
Redskins	14	3	0	0	17
Buccaneers	0	3	7	0	10

at Raymond James Stadium, Tampa, Florida

- Game time: 4:30 p.m. EST
- Game weather: 52 °F (11 °C), clear, cool, breezy
- Game attendance: 65,514
- Referee: Mike Carey
- TV announcers (ABC): Mike Patrick (play-by-play), Joe Theismann, Paul Maguire (color commentators), and Suzy Kolber (sideline reporter)

Game information

First quarter

- WAS – Clinton Portis 6-yard run (John Hall kick), 8:40. Redskins 7–0. Drive: 1 play, 6 yards, 0:05.
- WAS – Sean Taylor 51-yard fumble return (John Hall kick), 4:15. Redskins 14–0.

Second quarter

- TB – Matt Bryant 43-yard field goal, 10:02. Redskins 14–3. Drive: 11 plays, 38 yards, 5:28.
- WAS – Hall 47-yard field goal, 5:34. Redskins 17–3. Drive: 10 plays, 40 yards, 4:28.

Third quarter

- TB – Chris Simms 2-yard run (Matt Bryant kick), 9:40. Redskins 17–10. Drive: 7 plays, 51 yards, 3:23.

Fourth quarter

- No scoring plays.

Top passers

- WAS – Mark Brunell – 7/15, 41 yards, INT
- TB – Chris Simms – 25/38, 198 yards, 2 INT

Top rushers

- WAS – Clinton Portis – 16 rushes, 53 yards, TD
- TB – Cadillac Williams – 18 rushes, 49 yards

Top receivers

- WAS – Santana Moss – 2 receptions, 18 yards
- TB – Joey Galloway – 7 receptions, 69 yards

Although the Redskins gained only 120 yards on offense, the lowest total in NFL playoff history for a winning team, they converted two turnovers into touchdowns.

Midway through the first quarter, Washington linebacker LaVar Arrington's 21-yard interception return set up running back Clinton Portis' six-yard touchdown run. Then, Redskins linebacker Marcus Washington recovered Tampa Bay running back Cadillac Williams' fumble and returned it seven yards before losing it himself – into the arms of safety Sean Taylor, who then ran 51 yards for the Redskins' second touchdown.

Early in the second quarter, Tampa Bay drove 38 yards to the Redskins' 24-yard line where Matt Bryant kicked a 43-yard field goal to cut their deficit to 14–3. The Redskins responded with a 10-play, 40-yard drive and scored with a 40-yard field goal from John Hall.

In the third quarter, Mark Jones gave the Buccaneers the ball at their own 49-yard line on a 24-yard punt return. Tampa Bay's offense then went on a 7-play, 51-yard drive that ended with quarterback Chris Simms' two-yard touchdown run. In the fourth quarter, Tampa Bay drove to the Redskins 19-yard line, but linebacker Lemar Marshall tackled fullback Mike Alstott for no gain on third down and 1, and then Simms threw an incomplete pass on fourth down. Buccaneers cornerback Brian Kelly intercepted a pass from Mark Brunell on the Redskins' next drive and returned it to the Redskins 35-yard line. With three minutes left in the game, Tampa Bay wide receiver Edell Shepherd caught what appeared to be a 35-yard touchdown reception, but he lost control of the ball as he was coming down in the end zone for an incomplete pass. The Buccaneers got one last chance to tie the game when they received a punt at their own 46-yard line with 1:05 left in regulation, but Simms threw a pass that was tipped at the line of scrimmage and went into the arms of Marcus Washington for a game-ending interception.

The game was widely regarded by commentators as an "ugly" performance by both teams' offenses, rendering it a largely defensive game.

This was the final playoff victory for the "Redskins", as the controversial moniker was retired in 2020. Washington would not win in the postseason again until the 2024–25 NFL playoffs, which they won in Tampa again.

This was the second postseason meeting between the Redskins and Buccaneers. Tampa Bay won the only prior meeting.

Previous playoff games
Tampa Bay leads 1–0 in all-time playoff games

1999

Washington Redskins 13 @ Tampa Bay Buccaneers 14

1999 NFC Divisional playoffs

==== AFC: New England Patriots 28, Jacksonville Jaguars 3 ====
Jacksonville Jaguars vs. New England Patriots – Game summary

Quarter	1	2	3	4	Total
Jaguars	0	3	0	0	3
Patriots	0	7	14	7	28

at Gillette Stadium, Foxborough, Massachusetts

- Game time: 8:00 p.m. EST
- Game weather: 24 °F (−4 °C), clear, cold
- Game attendance: 68,756
- Referee: Walt Anderson
- TV announcers (ABC): Al Michaels (play-by-play), John Madden (color commentator), and Michele Tafoya (sideline reporter)

Game information

First quarter

- No scoring plays.

Second quarter

- NE – Troy Brown 11-yard pass from Tom Brady (Adam Vinatieri kick), 12:08. Patriots 7–0. Drive: 6 plays, 37 yards, 2:05
- JAX – Josh Scobee 36-yard field goal, 1:05. Patriots 7–3. Drive: 12 plays, 56 yards, 5:45.

Third quarter

- NE – David Givens 3-yard pass from Tom Brady (Adam Vinatieri kick), 7:13. Patriots 14–3. Drive: 12 plays, 81 yards, 6:42.
- NE – Benjamin Watson 63-yard pass from Tom Brady (Adam Vinatieri kick), 3:03. Patriots 21–3. Drive: 5 plays, 71 yards, 2:53.

Fourth quarter

- NE – Asante Samuel 73-yard interception return (Adam Vinatieri kick), 14:46. Patriots 28–3.

Top passers

- JAX – Byron Leftwich – 18/31, 179 yards, INT
- NE – Tom Brady – 15/27, 201 yards, 3 TD

Top rushers

- JAX – Byron Leftwich – 3 rushes, 26 yards
- NE – Kevin Faulk – 6 rushes, 51 yards

Top receivers

- JAX – Matt Jones – 6 receptions, 94 yards
- NE – Benjamin Watson – 5 receptions, 91 yards, TD

The three-time Super Bowl champion Patriots, who for the first time in their previous three playoff trips would have to win three games to advance to the Super Bowl, defeated the Jaguars 28–3. Linebacker Willie McGinest set NFL playoff records for sacks in a game (4.5, one ahead of the old record held by Richard Dent and Rich Milot) and career postseason sacks (16, two ahead of the old record held by Bruce Smith), while quarterback Tom Brady threw for 201 yards and three touchdown passes.

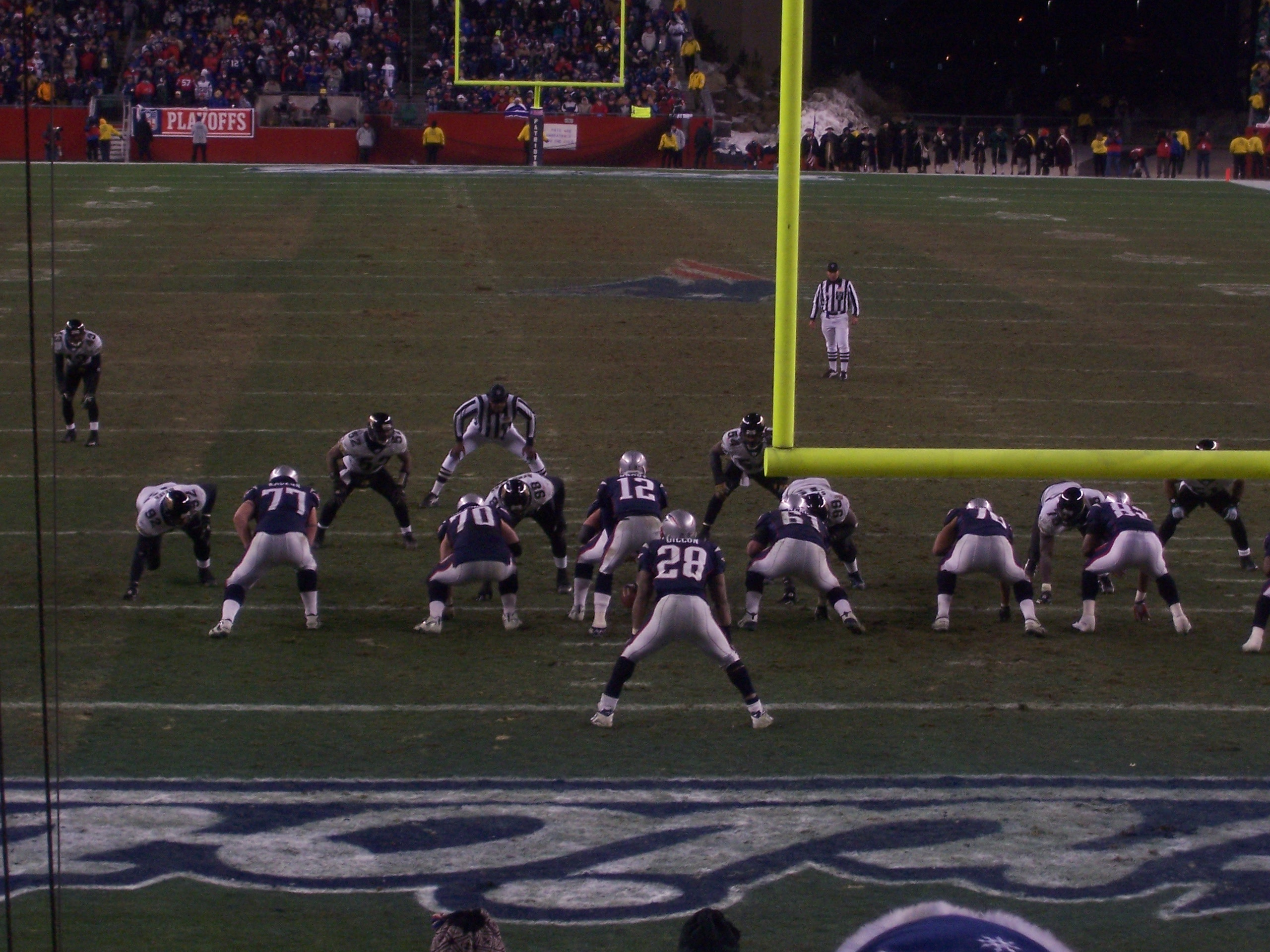
New England vs. Jacksonville in the 2005 wild card game

In the first half, the Jaguars recorded four sacks and held New England to 126 yards, while the Patriots defense recorded two sacks, gave up only 115 yards, and did not allow a first down until 9:40 remained in the second quarter. Neither team could score in the first quarter, but early in the second, New England receiver Tim Dwight returned Chris Hanson's 46-yard punt 27 yards to the Jaguars 37-yard line. Two 4-yard runs by Corey Dillon and an 18-yard burst from Kevin Faulk then moved the ball to the 11-yard line, and Brady capped off the drive with an 11-yard touchdown pass to Troy Brown. On Jacksonville's ensuing possession, Jimmy Smith's 19-yard reception gave his team a first down for the first time in the game and moved the ball to the Patriots 44-yard line. But on the next play, a tackle from safety Eugene Wilson caused Alvin Pearman to fumble the ball, and defensive end Richard Seymour recovered it. However, the Patriots could not take advantage of the turnover; Jacksonville managed to force a punt and then drove into scoring range for the first time in the game. Quarterback Byron Leftwich completed five passes for 59 yards on the drive, and Josh Scobee finished it with a 36-yard field goal, cutting their deficit to 7–3. After the kickoff, Faulk's 21-yard reception moved the ball to midfield and gave the Patriots a chance to increase their lead before halftime, but receiver Deion Branch dropped a pass from Brady at the Jaguars 10-yard line with 19 seconds left.

After forcing Jacksonville to punt on the opening drive of the second half, Brady led the Patriots 81-yards in 12 plays. On the 11th play, they nearly turned the ball over when tight end Benjamin Watson fumbled the ball on the Jaguars 5-yard line, but receiver André Davis recovered the ball, and Brady threw a 3-yard touchdown pass to David Givens on the next play. Then after forcing a punt, Brady threw a short pass to Watson who broke several tackles en route to a 63-yard score, increasing New England's lead to 21–3. After the kickoff, Leftwich led his team to the Patriots 32-yard line, but on the first play of the fourth quarter, cornerback Asante Samuel intercepted Leftwich's pass and took off for a 73-yard touchdown return, making the score 28–3. After that, Jacksonville mounted two more drives, but could not come away with any points. First they drove to the Patriots 8-yard line. But on third down and 2, McGinest sacked Leftwich for a 15-yard loss and Scobee missed a 41-yard field goal attempt on the next play. Then after forcing a punt, they drove to the Patriots 6-yard line, but ended up turning the ball over downs with five minutes left in the game.

This game also marked three career playoff records: Brady and Patriots head coach Bill Belichick set records with 10 straight postseason victories, eclipsing Vince Lombardi's run with the Green Bay Packers in the 1960s.

This was the third postseason meeting between the Jaguars and Patriots. Both teams split the prior two meetings.

Previous playoff games
Tied 1–1 in all-time playoff games

1996

Jacksonville Jaguars 6 @ New England Patriots 20

1996 AFC Championship Game

1998

New England Patriots 10 @ Jacksonville Jaguars 25

1998 AFC Wild Card playoffs

=== Sunday, January 8, 2006 ===
==== NFC: Carolina Panthers 23, New York Giants 0 ====
Carolina Panthers vs. New York Giants – Game summary

Quarter	1	2	3	4	Total
Panthers	0	10	7	6	23
Giants	0	0	0	0	0

at Giants Stadium, East Rutherford, New Jersey

- Game time: 1:00 p.m. EST
- Game weather: 44 °F (7 °C), sunny
- Game attendance: 79,378
- Referee: Bill Leavy
- TV announcers (Fox): Joe Buck (play-by-play), Troy Aikman (color commentator), Pam Oliver, and Chris Myers (sideline reporters)

Game information

First quarter

- No scoring plays.

Second quarter

- CAR – Steve Smith 22-yard pass from Jake Delhomme (John Kasay kick), 9:41. Panthers 7–0. Drive: 12 plays, 77 yards, 7:46.
- CAR – Kasay 31-yard field goal, 0:30. Panthers 10–0. Drive: 4 plays, 2 yards, 0:58.

Third quarter

- CAR – Steve Smith 12-yard run (John Kasay kick), 6:57. Panthers 17–0. Drive: 1 play, 12 yards, 0:06.

Fourth quarter

- CAR – Kasay 45-yard field goal, 13:33. Panthers 20–0. Drive: 10 plays, 55 yards, 6:07.
- CAR – Kasay 18-yard field goal, 2:40. Panthers 23–0. Drive: 14 plays, 55 yards, 8:55.

Top passers

- CAR – Jake Delhomme – 15/22, 140 yards, TD
- NYG – Eli Manning – 10/18, 113 yards, 3 INT

Top rushers

- CAR – DeShaun Foster – 27 rushes, 151 yards
- NYG – Tiki Barber – 13 rushes, 41 yards

Top receivers

- CAR – Steve Smith – 10 receptions, 84 yards, TD
- NYG – Jeremy Shockey – 3 receptions, 50 yards

The Panthers forced five turnovers, limited the Giants to only 109 yards of total offense, and became the first club to shut out a home playoff team since the Los Angeles Rams shut out the Tampa Bay Buccaneers in the 1979 NFC Championship Game. Although the Giants entered the game with Pro Bowler Tiki Barber starting at running back, the Panthers running game, featuring DeShaun Foster and Nick Goings, outgained the Giants 223 yards to 41 on the ground. Carolina wide receiver Steve Smith caught 10 passes for 84 yards and scored two touchdowns, a 22-yard reception and a 12-yard run, while kicker John Kasay added three field goals and Foster rushed for 151 yards. Meanwhile, quarterback Eli Manning threw three interceptions in his first playoff start.

After the first five possessions of the game ended with punts, Carolina drove 77 yards in 12 plays and scored with Jake Delhomme's 22-yard touchdown pass to Smith. On Carolina's next possession, they were forced to punt, but New York safety Gibril Wilson muffed the kick and Panthers cornerback Dante Wesley recovered the ball at the Giants 15-yard line, setting up a 31-yard Kasay field goal to increase the lead to 10–0.

Carolina dominated the second half, intercepting Manning three times. Midway through the third quarter, Ken Lucas intercepted a pass from Manning and returned it 14 yards to the Giants 12-yard line, setting up Smith's 12-yard touchdown run on the next play. On New York's next drive, a 17-yard pass interference penalty on Lucas nullified his second interception and gave the Giants a first down at the Panthers 43-yard line. But two plays later, Manning's pass was intercepted by Marlon McCree at the 18. On the Panthers ensuing drive, Foster rushed three times for 44 yards, and Delhomme completed a 25-yard pass to Keary Colbert, moving the ball to the Giants 27-yard line where Kasay's 45-yard field goal made the score 20–0. Then five plays after the kickoff, McCree recorded his second interception on the Panthers 44-yard line. Carolina subsequently closed out the scoring with a 14-play, 55-yard drive that ended with Kasay's third field goal with 2:40 left in the game.

This was the first postseason meeting between the Panthers and Giants.

==== AFC: Pittsburgh Steelers 31, Cincinnati Bengals 17 ====
Pittsburgh Steelers vs. Cincinnati Bengals – Game summary

Quarter	1	2	3	4	Total
Steelers	0	14	14	3	31
Bengals	10	7	0	0	17

at Paul Brown Stadium, Cincinnati, Ohio

- Game time: 4:30 p.m. EST
- Game weather: 61 °F (16 °C), partly cloudy
- Game attendance: 65,870
- Referee: Larry Nemmers
- TV announcers (CBS): Jim Nantz (play-by-play), Phil Simms (color commentator), and Bonnie Bernstein (sideline reporter)

Game information

First quarter

- CIN – Shayne Graham 23-yard field goal, 6:54. Bengals 3–0. Drive: 9 plays, 84 yards, 4:25.
- CIN – Rudi Johnson 20-yard run (Shayne Graham kick), 1:09. Bengals 10–0. Drive: 7 plays, 76 yards, 3:26.

Second quarter

- PIT – Willie Parker 19-yard pass from Ben Roethlisberger (Jeff Reed kick), 13:11. Bengals 10–7. Drive: 8 plays, 60 yards, 2:58.
- CIN – T. J. Houshmandzadeh 7-yard pass from Jon Kitna (Shayne Graham kick), 6:13. Bengals 17–7. Drive: 14 plays, 57 yards, 6:58.
- PIT – Hines Ward 5-yard pass from Ben Roethlisberger (Jeff Reed kick), 3:48. Bengals 17–14. Drive: 6 plays, 76 yards, 2:25.

Third quarter

- PIT – Jerome Bettis 5-yard run (Jeff Reed kick), 5:12. Steelers 21–17. Drive: 8 plays, 66 yards, 4:39.
- PIT – Cedrick Wilson 43-yard pass from Ben Roethlisberger (Jeff Reed kick), 1:13 Steelers 28–17. Drive: 3 plays, 50 yards, 1:25.

Fourth quarter

- PIT – Jeff Reed 21-yard field goal, 10:29. Steelers 31–17. Drive: 6 plays, 37 yards, 2:56.

Top passers

- PIT – Ben Roethlisberger – 14/19, 208 yards, 3 TD
- CIN – Jon Kitna – 24/40, 197 yards, TD, 2 INT

Top rushers

- PIT – Jerome Bettis – 10 rushes, 52 yards, TD
- CIN – Rudi Johnson – 13 rushes, 56 yards, TD

Top receivers

- PIT – Cedrick Wilson – 3 receptions, 104 yards, TD
- CIN – Kevin Walter – 5 receptions, 73 yards

The Bengals' first playoff appearance in 15 years began when Pro Bowl quarterback Carson Palmer was knocked out of the game on their opening drive. They still managed to build an early 10-point lead, but gave up 24 unanswered points later in the game while turning the ball over three times.

On the Bengals second offensive play of the game, Palmer suffered a season-ending knee injury after being hit by Pittsburgh's Kimo von Oelhoffen, but his 66-yard pass to wide receiver Chris Henry (who was also injured on the play) set up kicker Shayne Graham's 23-yard field goal. Then after forcing a punt, backup quarterback Jon Kitna completed three consecutive passes for 40 yards and rushed for 11, while running back Rudi Johnson finished the drive with a 20-yard touchdown run, increasing their lead to 10–0. Steelers cornerback Ike Taylor returned the ensuing kickoff 36 yards to the 40-yard line. Aided by a 15-yard penalty on cornerback Tory James, the Steelers subsequently drove 60 yards in eight plays and scored with Ben Roethlisberger's 19-yard touchdown pass to Willie Parker. The ensuing kickoff was returned by Tab Perry for 32 yards to his own 43-yard line, and then the Bengals drove 57 yards in 14 plays. Kitna completed the drive with a 7-yard touchdown pass to T. J. Houshmandzadeh, retaking their 10-point lead, 17–7. But on the Steelers ensuing drive, Roethlisberger's 54-yard completion to Cedrick Wilson set up his 5-yard touchdown pass to Hines Ward, cutting the score to 17–14 at halftime.

Cincinnati took the second half kickoff and advanced the ball 62 yards to the Steelers 15-yard line. Graham attempted a 34-yard field goal but center Brad St. Louis' high snap sent the ball over holder Kyle Larson's head. Graham recovered the fumble, but the Steelers took over on the 34-yard line. On the seventh play of the drive, safety Kevin Kaesviharn committed a 40-yard pass interference penalty on the Bengals 5-yard line, and Jerome Bettis ran the ball into the end zone on the next play.

After Cincinnati was forced to punt, Pittsburgh receiver Antwaan Randle El took a direct snap, ran to his right, and threw the ball back to Roethlisberger — who then connected with Wilson for a 43-yard touchdown reception that increased their lead to 28–17. Then on the Bengals next drive, inside linebacker James Farrior intercepted a pass from Kitna and returned it 22 yards to the Bengals 40-yard line, setting up a 23-yard field goal by Jeff Reed. Later in the fourth quarter, the Bengals managed to drive to the Steelers 43-yard line, but safety Troy Polamalu ended the drive with an interception and the Steelers offense ran out the rest of the clock.

This was the first postseason meeting between the Steelers and Bengals.

== Divisional round ==
=== Saturday, January 14, 2006 ===
==== NFC: Seattle Seahawks 20, Washington Redskins 10 ====
Washington Redskins vs. Seattle Seahawks – Game summary

Quarter	1	2	3	4	Total
Redskins	0	3	0	7	10
Seahawks	0	7	7	6	20

at Qwest Field, Seattle, Washington

- Game time: 4:30 p.m. EST/1:30 p.m. PST
- Game weather: 44 °F (7 °C), rain
- Game attendance: 67,551
- Referee: Ron Winter
- TV announcers (Fox): Dick Stockton (play-by-play), Daryl Johnston (color commentator), and Tony Siragusa (sideline reporter)

Game information

First quarter

- No scoring plays.

Second quarter

- WAS – John Hall 26-yard field goal, 8:59. Redskins 3–0. Drive: 10 plays, 32 yards, 5:02.
- SEA – Darrell Jackson 29-yard pass from Matt Hasselbeck (Josh Brown kick), 3:22. Seahawks 7–3. Drive: 12 plays, 74 yards, 5:37.

Third quarter

- SEA – Matt Hasselbeck 6-yard run (Josh Brown kick), 9:35. Seahawks 14–3. Drive: 10 plays, 81 yards, 4:20.

Fourth quarter

- SEA – Josh Brown 33-yard field goal, 14:16. Seahawks 17–3. Drive: 6 plays, 48 yards, 2:39.
- WAS – Santana Moss 20-yard pass from Mark Brunell (John Hall kick), 11:59. Seahawks 17–10. Drive: 4 plays, 76 yards, 2:17.
- SEA – Brown 31-yard field goal, 2:54. Seahawks 20–10. Drive: 9 plays, 60 yards, 5:07.

Top passers

- WAS – Mark Brunell – 22/37, 242 yards, TD
- SEA – Matt Hasselbeck – 16/26, 215 yards, TD

Top rushers

- WAS – Clinton Portis – 17 rushes, 41 yards
- SEA – Maurice Morris – 18 rushes, 49 yards

Top receivers

- WAS – Santana Moss – 7 receptions, 103 yards, TD
- SEA – Darrell Jackson – 9 receptions, 143 yards, TD

The Seahawks overcame an early concussion suffered by NFL MVP and rushing champion Shaun Alexander, and three turnovers, to end their 21-year playoff victory drought. Seattle quarterback Matt Hasselbeck led the offense, completing 16 out of 26 passes for 215 yards and a touchdown, while also rushing for 21 yards and another score. Despite the loss of Alexander, Seattle outgained the Redskins in rushing yards 119 to 59 and held Clinton Portis, who rushed for over 1,500 yards during the season, to just 41 yards on 17 carries.

The Seahawks took the opening kickoff and drove to the Redskins 11-yard line, but then Alexander lost a fumble without being touched, and linebacker Lemar Marshall recovered it. After that, the two teams were forced to punt on all their possessions in the first quarter, and with 5:28 remaining, Alexander was knocked out of the game.

Washington scored first in the second quarter after a muffed punt set up John Hall's 26-yard field goal. Seattle responded by driving 74 yards in 12 plays and scoring with Hasselbeck's 29-yard touchdown pass to Darrell Jackson.

After forcing the Redskins to punt on the opening drive of the third quarter, Hasselbeck led the Seahawks on an 81-yard scoring drive, completing four passes for 54 yards and finishing it with a 9-yard touchdown run to give his team a 14–3 lead. Washington responded with a drive to the Seahawks 33-yard line, but on a fourth down conversion attempt, quarterback Mark Brunell lost a fumble while being sacked by Bryce Fisher, and defensive end Grant Wistrom recovered it. One play later, Hasselbeck's 37-yard completion to Jackson set up a 33-yard field goal by Josh Brown on the second play of the fourth quarter, making the score 17–3.

After the ensuing kickoff, Brunell's 52-yard completion to Chris Cooley moved the ball to Seattle's 24-yard line. Three plays later, he threw a 20-yard touchdown pass to Santana Moss, a throw that bounced off the shoulder of Seattle cornerback Andre Dyson into Moss' arms. Washington got the ball back when Hall recovered a fumble from Josh Scobey at the Seahawks 40-yard line on the ensuing kickoff. But the Redskins drive stalled at the 18-yard line and ended with no points when Hall missed a 36-yard field goal attempt.

Seattle then drove to the game-clinching field goal, led by fullback Mack Strong's career-long 32-yard run. The Seahawks' win was their first since a 1984 AFC Wild Card playoff win over the then-Los Angeles Raiders.

This was the first postseason meeting between the Redskins and Seahawks.

==== AFC: Denver Broncos 27, New England Patriots 13 ====
New England Patriots vs. Denver Broncos – Game summary

Quarter	1	2	3	4	Total
Patriots	0	3	3	7	13
Broncos	0	10	7	10	27

at Invesco Field at Mile High, Denver, Colorado

- Game time: 8:00 p.m. EST/6:00 p.m. MST
- Game weather: 54 °F (12 °C), partly cloudy
- Game attendance: 76,238
- Referee: Jeff Triplette
- TV announcers (CBS): Jim Nantz (play-by-play), Phil Simms (color commentator), and Bonnie Bernstein (sideline reporter)

Game information

First quarter

- No scoring plays.

Second quarter

- NE – Adam Vinatieri 40-yard field goal, 3:48. Patriots 3–0. Drive: 7 plays, 67 yards, 2:22.
- DEN – Mike Anderson 1-yard run (Jason Elam kick), 1:42. Broncos 7–3. Drive: 2 plays, 40 yards, 0:18.
- DEN – Jason Elam 50-yard field goal, 0:43. Broncos 10–3. Drive: 4 plays, seven yards, 0:59.

Third quarter

- NE – Adam Vinatieri 32-yard field goal, 7:49. Broncos 10–6. Drive: 11 plays, 58 yards, 5:31.
- DEN – Mike Anderson 1-yard run (Jason Elam kick), 0:43. Broncos 17–6. Drive: 1 play, 1 yard, 0:04.

Fourth quarter

- DEN – Rod Smith 4-yard pass from Jake Plummer (Jason Elam kick), 8:38. Broncos 24–6. Drive: 3 plays, 15 yards, 1:32.
- NE – David Givens 4-yard pass from Tom Brady (Adam Vinatieri kick), 8:05. Broncos 24–13. Drive: 2 plays, 77 yards, 0:33.
- DEN – Elam 34-yard field goal, 3:20. Broncos 27–13. Drive: 8 plays, 61 yards, 4:45.

Top passers

- NE – Tom Brady – 20/36, 341 yards, TD, 2 INT
- DEN – Jake Plummer – 15/26, 197 yards, TD, INT

Top rushers

- NE – Corey Dillon – 13 rushes, 57 yards
- DEN – Mike Anderson – 19 rushes, 69 yards

Top receivers

- NE – Deion Branch – 8 receptions, 153 yards
- DEN – Rod Smith – 6 receptions, 96 yards, TD

The Broncos converted four out of five turnovers into 24 points as they eliminated the two-time defending Super Bowl champion Patriots, 27–13, and won their first playoff game since defeating the Atlanta Falcons in Super Bowl XXXIII. This game also ended New England's league-record ten-game postseason winning streak and gave quarterback Tom Brady his first ever postseason loss.

Early in the second quarter, the Broncos drove to the Patriots 3-yard line, only to turn the ball over on downs after failing to convert a fourth down and 1. Then after forcing a punt, Broncos quarterback Jake Plummer threw a pass that was intercepted by Asante Samuel. On the next play, Patriots quarterback Tom Brady threw a 51-yard completion to André Davis setting up Adam Vinatieri's 40-yard field goal to give New England a 3–0 lead.

With New England leading 3–0 with less than two minutes left in the first half, Broncos linebacker Ian Gold recovered a fumble from Kevin Faulk on the Patriots 40-yard line. After that, a pass interference penalty on Samuel moved the ball to the 1-yard line, and then Mike Anderson scored a 1-yard touchdown run on the next play. On the ensuing kickoff, Ellis Hobbs fumbled and kicker Todd Sauerbrun recovered the ball on the Patriots 39-yard line, setting up kicker Jason Elam's 50-yard field goal to give Denver a 10–3 halftime lead.

Early in the third quarter, the Patriots drove 58 yards in 11 plays and scored with a 32-yard field goal from Vinatieri, cutting their deficit to 10–6. With less than a minute to go in the third quarter, New England reached the Denver 5-yard line. However, Brady was intercepted for the first time in the playoffs since Super Bowl XXXVIII. The interception was returned by Champ Bailey for 101 yards before New England tight end Benjamin Watson knocked the ball out of bounds at the New England 1-yard line. The Patriots challenged whether the ball was actually knocked through and out of the end zone (which would have been a touchback and given the Patriots the ball at their own 20-yard line), but the original call stood. Anderson then ran for another one-yard touchdown on the next play to make it 17–6. Then on New England's next drive, the usually accurate Vinatieri missed a 42-yard field goal, his first in 21 field goal attempts in the playoffs. Later in the fourth quarter, Troy Brown muffed a Denver punt and the Broncos recovered it on New England's 15-yard line, setting up Rod Smith's four-yard touchdown pass from Plummer.

With 8:33 left in the game, Brady completed a 73-yard pass to Deion Branch and then followed it up with a 4-yard touchdown pass to David Givens, cutting the score to 24–13. But on the Broncos ensuing possession, Plummer's 42-yard completion to Smith set up another Elam field goal. Denver then all but clinched the game when safety John Lynch intercepted a Brady pass with less than three minutes left.

This was the second postseason meeting between the Patriots and Broncos, with Denver winning the only prior meeting.

Previous playoff games
Denver leads 1–0 in all-time playoff games

1986

New England Patriots 17 @ Denver Broncos 22

1986 AFC Divisional playoffs

=== Sunday, January 15, 2006 ===
==== AFC: Pittsburgh Steelers 21, Indianapolis Colts 18 ====
Pittsburgh Steelers vs. Indianapolis Colts – Game summary

Quarter	1	2	3	4	Total
Steelers	14	0	7	0	21
Colts	0	3	0	15	18

at RCA Dome, Indianapolis, Indiana

- Game time: 1:00 p.m. EST
- Game weather: Played indoors, domed stadium
- Game attendance: 57,449
- Referee: Pete Morelli
- TV announcers (CBS): Dick Enberg (play-by-play), Dan Dierdorf (color commentator), and Armen Keteyian (sideline reporter)

Game information

First quarter

- PIT – Antwaan Randle El 6-yard pass from Ben Roethlisberger (Jeff Reed kick), 9:25. Steelers 7–0. Drive: 10 plays, 84 yards, 5:35.
- PIT – Earl Heath Miller 7-yard pass from Ben Roethlisberger (Jeff Reed kick), 3:12. Steelers 14–0. Drive: 7 plays, 72 yards, 2:53.

Second quarter

- IND – Mike Vanderjagt 20-yard field goal, 1:20. Steelers 14–3. Drive: 15 plays, 96 yards, 9:39.

Third quarter

- PIT – Jerome Bettis 1-yard run (Jeff Reed kick), 1:26. Steelers 21–3. Drive: 6 plays, 30 yards, 3:21.

Fourth quarter

- IND – Dallas Clark 50-yard pass from Peyton Manning (Mike Vanderjagt kick), 14:09. Steelers 21–10. Drive: 6 plays, 72 yards, 2:17.
- IND – Edgerrin James 3-yard run (Reggie Wayne pass from Peyton Manning), 4:24. Steelers 21–18. Drive: 6 plays, 80 yards, 1:39.

Top passers

- PIT – Ben Roethlisberger – 14/24, 197 yards, 2 TD, INT
- IND – Peyton Manning – 22/38, 290 yards, TD

Top rushers

- PIT – Willie Parker – 17 rushes, 59 yards
- IND – Edgerrin James – 13 rushes, 56 yards, TD

Top receivers

- PIT – Hines Ward – 3 receptions, 68 yards
- IND – Reggie Wayne – 7 receptions, 97 yards

The Steelers became the first #6 playoff seed (since the league expanded to a 12-team playoff format in 1990) to defeat a #1 seed, and also the first #6 seed to reach a conference championship game. Colts quarterback Peyton Manning threw for 290 passing yards and a touchdown, but it wasn't enough to win.

The Steelers stunned the Colts home crowd at the RCA Dome by driving 84 yards and scoring on their opening possession. Pittsburgh quarterback Ben Roethlisberger completed six consecutive passes for 76 yards, including a 36-yard completion to tight end Heath Miller and a 6-yard touchdown pass to Antwaan Randle El. Later in the first quarter, Roethlisberger's 45-yard completion to Hines Ward moved the ball to the Colts 8-yard line, and they scored another touchdown with his 7-yard pass to Miller, increasing the Steelers' lead to 14–0.

Five minutes into the second quarter, Indianapolis managed to get a good drive going, advancing the ball 96 yards to the Steelers 2-yard line and taking 9:39 off the clock, but were forced to settle for a field goal from Mike Vanderjagt, cutting their deficit to 14–3.

Late in the third quarter, Steelers linebacker James Farrior (who finished the game with eight tackles and 2.5 sacks) sacked Manning at the Colts 1-yard line on third down, and Randle El returned Hunter Smith's ensuing punt 20 yards to the Indianapolis 30. Five plays later, Jerome Bettis scored a 1-yard touchdown run, making the score 21–3. But this time, Indianapolis struck back, driving 72 yards in six plays and scoring with Manning's 50-yard touchdown pass to tight end Dallas Clark. The Steelers were forced to punt on their ensuing drive, but only after taking over seven minutes off the clock, leaving just 6:03 left in the game by the time Indianapolis got the ball back.

One play after the punt, an interception by Pittsburgh safety Troy Polamalu was overturned by instant replay (a reversal that the league would later admit was a mistake). Taking advantage of his second chance, Manning completed a 9-yard pass to Clark, a 20-yard pass to Marvin Harrison, and a 24-yard pass to Reggie Wayne, moving the ball to the Steelers 3-yard line. Running back Edgerrin James finished the drive with a 3-yard touchdown run, and then Manning threw a pass to Wayne for a successful 2-point conversion, cutting the Colts deficit to 21–18. The Steelers were forced to punt on their ensuing drive. But with 1:20 left in the game, Manning was sacked on fourth and 16 at the Colts' 2-yard line, and the ball was turned over to the Steelers on downs.

At this point, the game appeared to be over. However, the Steelers were forced to advance the ball towards another score instead of taking a quarterback kneel because the Colts still had three timeouts remaining. But on Pittsburgh's first play, in which Bettis tried to punch it in for an insurance touchdown, he fumbled for the first time all season when linebacker Gary Brackett popped it from Bettis' hands with his helmet. Nick Harper recovered the ball and appeared to be on his way for an Indianapolis touchdown that would have given the Colts the lead when Roethlisberger barely made a season saving tackle at the Colts' 42-yard line, recovering from getting spun around to grab Harper's ankle, which brought him down. Eventually, the Colts then advanced to the Pittsburgh 28-yard line, but Vanderjagt, who had been perfect at home in the playoffs, missed a 46-yard game-tying field goal attempt wide right with 17 seconds left, and the Steelers ran out the clock.

This game marked the beginning of the end for Vanderjagt, who entered the game as the NFL's all-time leader in field goal percentage. The following year, the Colts decided to let his contract expire. He spent the next season with the Dallas Cowboys, where he made just 72% of his field goals before leaving the NFL for good.

This was the fifth postseason meeting between the Steelers and Colts, with Pittsburgh having won all four prior meetings.

Previous playoff games
Pittsburgh leads 4–0 in all-time playoff games

1975

Baltimore Colts 10 @ Pittsburgh Steelers 28

1975 AFC Divisional playoffs

1976

Pittsburgh Steelers 40 @ Baltimore Colts 14

1976 AFC Divisional playoffs

1995

Indianapolis Colts 16 @ Pittsburgh Steelers 20

1995 AFC Championship Game

1996

Indianapolis Colts 14 @ Pittsburgh Steelers 42

1995 AFC Wild Card playoffs

==== NFC: Carolina Panthers 29, Chicago Bears 21 ====
Carolina Panthers vs. Chicago Bears – Game summary

Quarter	1	2	3	4	Total
Panthers	7	9	7	6	29
Bears	0	7	7	7	21

at Soldier Field, Chicago, Illinois

- Game time: 4:30 p.m. EST/3:30 p.m. CST
- Game weather: 40 °F (4 °C), partly cloudy
- Game attendance: 62,209
- Referee: Walt Coleman
- TV announcers (Fox): Joe Buck (play-by-play), Troy Aikman (color commentator), Pam Oliver, and Chris Myers (sideline reporters)

Game information

First quarter

- CAR – Steve Smith 58-yard pass from Jake Delhomme (John Kasay kick), 14:05. Panthers 7–0. Drive: 2 plays, 60 yards, 0:55.

Second quarter

- CAR – John Kasay yard 20 field goal, 14:57. Panthers 10–0. Drive: 10 plays, 62 yards, 4:01.
- CAR – John Kasay yard 38 field goal, 6:26. Panthers 13–0. Drive: 8 plays, 40 yards, 4:26.
- CHI – Adrian Peterson 1-yard run (Robbie Gould kick), 1:57. Panthers 13–7. Drive: 9 plays, 67 yards, 4:29.
- CAR – John Kasay 37-yard field goal, 0:00. Panthers 16–7. Drive: 8 plays, 51 yards, 1:57.

Third quarter

- CHI – Desmond Clark 1-yard pass from Rex Grossman (Robbie Gould kick), 11:21. Panthers 16–14. Drive: 8 plays, 68 yards, 3:39.
- CAR – Steve Smith 39-yard pass from Jake Delhomme (John Kasay kick), 2:07. Panthers 23–14. Drive: 5 plays, 56 yards, 3:24.

Fourth quarter

- CHI – Jason McKie 3-yard run (Robbie Gould kick), 12:23. Panthers 23–21. Drive: 11 plays, 66 yards, 4:44.
- CAR – Kris Mangum 1-yard pass from Jake Delhomme (kick failed), 8:04. Panthers 29–21. Drive: 7 plays, 62 yards, 4:19.

Top passers

- CAR – Jake Delhomme – 24/33, 319 yards, 3 TD, INT
- CHI – Rex Grossman – 17/41, 192 yards, TD, INT

Top rushers

- CAR – DeShaun Foster – 16 rushes, 54 yards
- CHI – Thomas Jones – 20 rushes, 80 yards

Top receivers

- CAR – Steve Smith – 12 receptions, 218 yards, 2 TD
- CHI – Bernard Berrian – 5 receptions, 68 yards

The Panthers recorded 434 yards of total offense, and avenged a 13–3 regular season defeat by the Bears, to advance to their third NFC Championship Game in their eleven-year existence. Carolina receiver Steve Smith caught 12 passes for 218 yards and two touchdowns, the first coming 55 seconds into the contest, and rushed for 26 yards. Panthers kicker John Kasay contributed three second-quarter field goals, while quarterback Jake Delhomme threw for 319 yards and three touchdowns. Although the Panthers lost key running back DeShaun Foster to a broken ankle in the third quarter, they still held off the Bears.

The Panthers got the ball first and scored quickly. Jamal Robertson returned the opening kickoff 34 yards to the 40-yard line, and one play later, Delhomme threw a 58-yard touchdown pass to Smith. Later on, Smith's 46-yard reception set up a 20-yard field goal on the first play of the second quarter, increasing their lead to 10–0. On their next drive, Carolina had a chance to increase their lead even more after Delhomme completed passes to Drew Carter for gains of 14 and 29 yards, moving the ball to the Bears 23-yard line. But linebacker Brian Urlacher ended the drive by intercepting a pass from Delhomme at the 10. However, the Panthers forced another punt and scored with a second field goal from Kasay. Bears quarterback Rex Grossman completed five passes for 62 yards on a 67-yard drive that ended with a 1-yard touchdown run by Adrian Peterson cutting the score to 13–7. But Carolina stormed right back, driving 51 yards and scoring with Kasay's third field goal on the last play of the first half.

After the second half kickoff, a 24-yard run by Bears running back Thomas Jones moved the ball to the Panthers 41-yard line. Then Grossman went to work, completing two passes to Bernard Berrian for 29 yards before finishing the drive with a 1-yard touchdown pass to tight end Desmond Clark. But after an exchange of punts, Delhomme threw a 39-yard touchdown pass to Smith, and the Panthers retook their 9-point lead.

Early in the fourth quarter, Chicago's Jason McKie scored a 3-yard touchdown run to cut their deficit to 23–21. But Delhomme led the Panthers right back, completing five passes for 45 yards and scoring with a 1-yard touchdown pass to tight end Kris Mangum. After an exchange of punts, the Bears drove into Carolina territory, but cornerback Ken Lucas put the game away by intercepting a pass from Grossman on the Panthers 22-yard line.

This was the first postseason meeting between the Panthers and Bears.

== Conference championships ==
This was the first time since the 1989–90 NFL playoffs that neither conference championship game took place in the Eastern or Central time zone. During that season, the Conference Championship Games were changed from the then-traditional starting times of 12:30 p.m. and 4:00 p.m. to 1:30 p.m. and 5:00 p.m. EST respectively. This was to accommodate the fact that the Denver Broncos and San Francisco 49ers hosted the 1989–90 AFC and NFC Championship Games in the Mountain Time Zone and Pacific Time Zone, respectively — thus avoiding a locally played game at 9:30 a.m. PST/10:30 a.m. MST, but also forcing the networks to change or move their prime time lineups in a moment's notice. When the league changed the traditional starting times for the 2002–03 NFL playoffs to 3 p.m. and 6:30 p.m. EST, it eliminated the future possibility of having to reschedule.

=== Sunday, January 22, 2006 ===
==== AFC: Pittsburgh Steelers 34, Denver Broncos 17 ====
Pittsburgh Steelers vs. Denver Broncos – Game summary

Quarter	1	2	3	4	Total
Steelers	3	21	0	10	34
Broncos	0	3	7	7	17

at Invesco Field at Mile High, Denver, Colorado

- Game time: 3:00 p.m. EST/1:00 p.m. MST
- Game weather: 34 °F (1 °C), sunny
- Game attendance: 76,775
- Referee: Terry McAulay
- TV announcers (CBS): Jim Nantz (play-by-play), Phil Simms (color commentator), Bonnie Bernstein, and Armen Keteyian (sideline reporters)

Game information

First quarter

- PIT – Jeff Reed 47-yard field goal, 4:11. Steelers 3–0. Drive: 12 plays, 62 yards, 6:29.

Second quarter

- PIT – Cedrick Wilson 12-yard pass from Ben Roethlisberger (Jeff Reed kick), 14:54. Steelers 10–0. Drive: 5 plays, 39 yards, 2:53.
- DEN – Jason Elam 23-yard field goal, 9:23. Steelers 10–3. Drive: 12 plays, 55 yards, 5:31.
- PIT – Jerome Bettis 3-yard run (Jeff Reed kick), 1:55. Steelers 17–3. Drive: 14 plays, 80 yards, 7:28.
- PIT – Hines Ward 17-yard pass from Ben Roethlisberger (Jeff Reed kick), 0:07. Steelers 24–3. Drive: 4 plays, 38 yards, 1:41.

Third quarter

- DEN – Ashley Lelie 30-yard pass from Jake Plummer (Jason Elam kick), 3:36. Steelers 24–10. Drive: 5 plays, 80 yards, 2:24.

Fourth quarter

- PIT – Jeff Reed 42-yard field goal, 13:38. Steelers 27–10. Drive: 8 plays, 47 yards, 4:58.
- DEN – Mike Anderson 3-yard run (Jason Elam kick), 7:52. Steelers 27–17. Drive: 7 plays, 85 yards, 3:47.
- PIT – Ben Roethlisberger 4-yard run (Jeff Reed kick), 2:59. Steelers 34–17. Drive: 5 plays, 17 yards, 1:53.

Top passers

- PIT – Ben Roethlisberger – 21/29, 275 yards, 2 TD
- DEN – Jake Plummer – 18/30, 223 yards, TD, 2 INT

Top rushers

- PIT – Jerome Bettis – 15 rushes, 39 yards, TD
- DEN – Mike Anderson – 9 rushes, 36 yards, TD

Top receivers

- PIT – Cedrick Wilson – 5 receptions, 92 yards, TD
- DEN – Ashley Lelie – 2 receptions, 68 yards, TD

For the first time since 1984, the Steelers played on the road in the AFC Championship Game, but it hardly mattered as they forced four turnovers and went into halftime with a 24–3 lead en route to advancing to their sixth Super Bowl appearance in team history. In doing so, Pittsburgh became the first #6 playoff seed (since the league expanded to a 12-team playoff format in 1990) to advance to the Super Bowl. Second-year quarterback Ben Roethlisberger, already in his fifth career playoff game, completed 21 of 29 passes for 275 yards and two touchdowns (one each to Cedrick Wilson and Hines Ward) and ran for a third. Steelers running back Jerome Bettis rushed for the other touchdown.

Pittsburgh scored on their opening drive, moving the ball 62 yards in 12 plays and ending it with a Jeff Reed field goal. Three plays after the kickoff, Broncos quarterback Jake Plummer lost a fumble while being sacked by Joey Porter and Steelers nose tackle Casey Hampton recovered it at the Denver 39-yard line. Four plays later, Roethlisberger's 12-yard touchdown pass to Wilson increased the Steelers lead to 10–0 on the first play of the second quarter. The Broncos responded by driving 55 yards and scoring with a field goal from Jason Elam. But Pittsburgh stormed right back, marching 80 yards in 14 plays and scoring with Bettis' 3-yard touchdown run to take a 17–3 lead. Then on the first play after the ensuing kickoff, Ike Taylor intercepted a pass from Plummer on the Broncos 39-yard line. Four plays later, a Bettis touchdown run was called back because of a penalty on Ward. But Ward made up for his mistake by catching a touchdown pass on the next play, giving the Steelers a 24–3 lead with seven seconds left in the half.

In the third quarter, Plummer finally got the Broncos moving by completing four consecutive passes for 80 yards, the last one a 30-yard touchdown pass to Ashley Lelie. But Wilson caught two passes for 45 yards on Pittsburgh's next possession, setting up Reed's second field goal to make the score 27–10.

In the fourth quarter, a 38-yard reception by Lelie and a 22-yard pass interference penalty on Taylor set up a 3-yard touchdown run by Mike Anderson, cutting Denver's deficit to 27–17. But after a Steelers punt, defensive end Brett Keisel forced a fumble on fourth down from Plummer and his teammate Travis Kirschke recovered it at the Broncos 17-yard line. Four plays later, Roethlisberger ended any chance of a Denver comeback with a 4-yard touchdown run.

This would prove to be the Broncos' last playoff game with Mike Shanahan as their head coach, and last until 2011. It would also be Shanahan's last playoff game until 2012, with Washington.

This was the sixth postseason meeting between the Steelers and Broncos. Denver won three of the prior five meetings.

Previous playoff games
Denver leads 3–2 in all-time playoff games

1977

Pittsburgh Steelers 21 @ Denver Broncos 34

1977 AFC Divisional playoffs

1978

Denver Broncos 10 @ Pittsburgh Steelers 33

1978 AFC Divisional playoffs

1984

Pittsburgh Steelers 24 @ Denver Broncos 17

1984 AFC Divisional playoffs

1989

Pittsburgh Steelers 23 @ Denver Broncos 24

1989 AFC Divisional playoffs

1997

Denver Broncos 24 @ Pittsburgh Steelers 21

1997 AFC Championship Game

==== NFC: Seattle Seahawks 34, Carolina Panthers 14 ====
Carolina Panthers vs. Seattle Seahawks – Game summary

Quarter	1	2	3	4	Total
Panthers	0	7	0	7	14
Seahawks	10	10	7	7	34

at Qwest Field, Seattle, Washington

- Game time: 6:30 p.m. EST/3:30 p.m. PST
- Game weather: 48 °F (9 °C), overcast
- Game attendance: 67,837
- Referee: Ed Hochuli
- TV announcers (Fox): Joe Buck (play-by-play), Troy Aikman (color commentator), Pam Oliver, and Chris Myers (sideline reporters)

Game information

First quarter

- SEA – Jerramy Stevens 17-yard pass from Matt Hasselbeck (Josh Brown kick), 5:31. Seahawks 7–0. Drive: 5 plays, 57 yards, 2:16.
- SEA – Josh Brown 24-yard field goal, 2:23. Seahawks 10–0. Drive: 6 plays, 14 yards, 2:41.

Second quarter

- SEA – Shaun Alexander 1-yard run (Josh Brown kick), 14:53. Seahawks 17–0. Drive: 4 plays, 17 yards, 0:57.
- CAR – Steve Smith 59-yard punt return (John Kasay kick), 9:05. Seahawks 17–7.
- SEA – Josh Brown 39-yard field goal, 4:03. Seahawks 20–7. Drive: 10 plays, 57 yards, 4:59.

Third quarter

- SEA – Darrell Jackson 20-yard pass from Matt Hasselbeck (Josh Brown kick), 11:09. Seahawks 27–7. Drive: 8 plays, 65 yards, 3:51.

Fourth quarter

- SEA – Shawn Alexander 1-yard run (Josh Brown kick), 6:00. Seahawks 34–7. Drive: 8 plays, 53 yards, 4:48.
- CAR – Drew Carter 47-yard pass from Jake Delhomme (John Kasay kick), 5:09. Seahawks 34–14. Drive: 4 plays, 80 yards, 0:51.

Top passers

- CAR – Jake Delhomme – 15/35, 196 yards, TD, 3 INT
- SEA – Matt Hasselbeck – 20/28, 219 yards, 2 TD

Top rushers

- CAR – Jamal Robertson – 4 rushes, 19 yards
- SEA – Shaun Alexander – 34 rushes, 132 yards, 2 TD

Top receivers

- CAR – Drew Carter – 2 receptions, 88 yards, TD
- SEA – Darrell Jackson – 6 receptions, 75 yards, TD

The Seahawks forced four turnovers, and allowed only 36 rushing yards and 14 points, as they advanced to their first Super Bowl in the team's 30-year history. Meanwhile, running back Shaun Alexander, coming off his divisional round injury, rushed for a franchise playoff record 134 yards and two touchdowns.

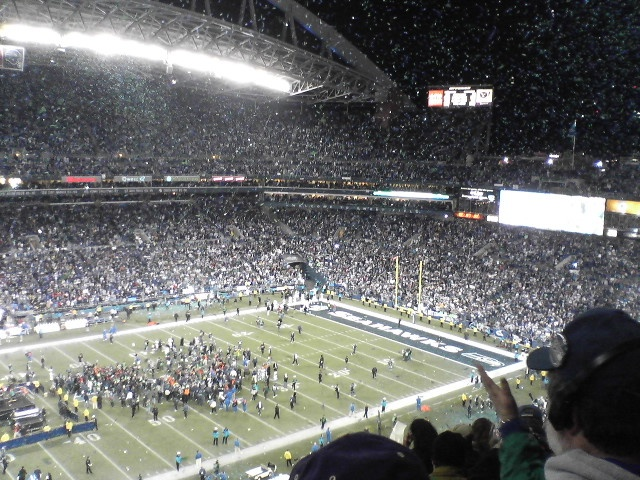
Seahawks celebrations after winning the NFC Championship

Midway through the first quarter, the Seahawks drove 57 yards in five plays, featuring a 28-yard reception by Seneca Wallace, and scored with quarterback Matt Hasselbeck's 17-yard touchdown pass to Jerramy Stevens. Then three plays after the ensuing kickoff, linebacker Lofa Tatupu intercepted a pass from Jake Delhomme and returned it 22 yards to the Panthers 20-yard line, setting up a field goal from Josh Brown. The next time Carolina got the ball, Delhomme was intercepted again, this time by Marquand Manuel, who returned it 32 yards to the Panthers 17-yard line, setting up Alexander's 1-yard touchdown run that increased Seattle's lead to 17–0 on the first play of the second quarter. The Panthers eventually cut the score to 17–7 on Steve Smith's 59-yard punt return for a touchdown with 9:56 left in the first half.

The Seahawks scored another 17 unanswered points. On their first drive after the punt return touchdown, they moved the ball 57 yards and scored with a 39-yard field goal from Brown. Brown missed a field goal on the Seahawks next possession, but on the first drive of the second half, they scored with Hasselbeck's 20-yard touchdown pass to Darrell Jackson. Then in the fourth quarter, they put the game completely out of reach with a 53-yard drive that ended with Alexander's second touchdown. Carolina responded with a 47-yard touchdown pass from Delhomme to receiver Drew Carter, cutting the score to 34–14, but by then there was only five minutes left in the game.

This was the first postseason meeting between the Panthers and Seahawks.

== Super Bowl XL: Pittsburgh Steelers 21, Seattle Seahawks 10 ==
Super Bowl XL – Seattle Seahawks vs. Pittsburgh Steelers – Game summary

Quarter	1	2	3	4	Total
Seahawks (NFC)	3	0	7	0	10
Steelers (AFC)	0	7	7	7	21

at Ford Field, Detroit, Michigan

- Date: February 5, 2006
- Game time: 6:25 p.m. EST
- Game weather: Played indoors, domed stadium
- Game attendance: 68,206
- Referee: Bill Leavy
- TV announcers (ABC): Al Michaels (play-by-play), John Madden (color commentator), Michele Tafoya, and Suzy Kolber (sideline reporters)
- Recap

This was the first Super Bowl meeting between the Seahawks and Steelers.

== Sources ==
- "Redskins defense eliminates Bucs 17–10". NFL.com wire reports. January 7, 2006.
- "NFL Gamebook – WAS @ TB" (PDF). NFL.com. January 7, 2006.
- "McGinest, Patriots sack Jaguars 28–3". NFL.com wire reports. January 7, 2006.
- "NFL Gamebook – JAC @ NE" (PDF). NFL.com. January 7, 2006.
- "Panthers blast Giants 23–0 in wild card". NFL.com wire reports. January 8, 2006.
- "NFL Gamebook – CAR @ NYG" (PDF). NFL.com. January 8, 2006.
- "Bengals lose Palmer, then fall to Steelers". NFL.com wire reports. January 8, 2006.
- "NFL Gamebook – PIT @ CIN" (PDF). NFL.com. January 8, 2006.
- "Seattle advances without Alexander 20–10". NFL.com wire reports. January 14, 2006.
- "NFL Gamebook – WAS @ SEA" (PDF). NFL.com. January 14, 2006.
- "Broncos dethrone Patriots 27–13". NFL.com wire reports. January 14, 2006.
- "NFL Gamebook – NE @ DEN" (PDF). NFL.com. January 14, 2006.
- "Steelers survive strange Colts rally, 21–18". NFL.com wire reports. January 15, 2006.
- "NFL Gamebook – PIT @ IND" (PDF). NFL.com. January 15, 2006.
- "Smith, Panthers down Bears 29–21". NFL.com wire reports. January 15, 2006.
- "NFL Gamebook – CAR @ CHI" (PDF). NFL.com. January 15, 2006.
- "Steelers Super Bowl bound with 34–17 win". NFL.com wire reports. January 22, 2006.
- "NFL Gamebook – PIT @ DEN" (PDF). NFL.com. January 22, 2006.
- "Dominant Seahawks reach first Super Bowl". NFL.com wire reports. January 22, 2006.
- "NFL Gamebook – CAR @ SEA" (PDF). NFL.com. January 22, 2006.
