= 2005 Carolina Panthers season =

NFL team season

- Owner: Jerry Richardson
- General manager: Marty Hurney
- Head coach: John Fox
- Home stadium: Bank of America Stadium

Results
- Record: 11–5
- Division place: 2nd NFC South
- Playoffs: Won Wild Card Playoffs (at Giants) 23–0; Won Divisional Playoffs (at Bears) 29–21; Lost NFC Championship (at Seahawks) 14–34
- Pro Bowlers: QB Jake Delhomme; DE Julius Peppers; WR Steve Smith; G Mike Wahle

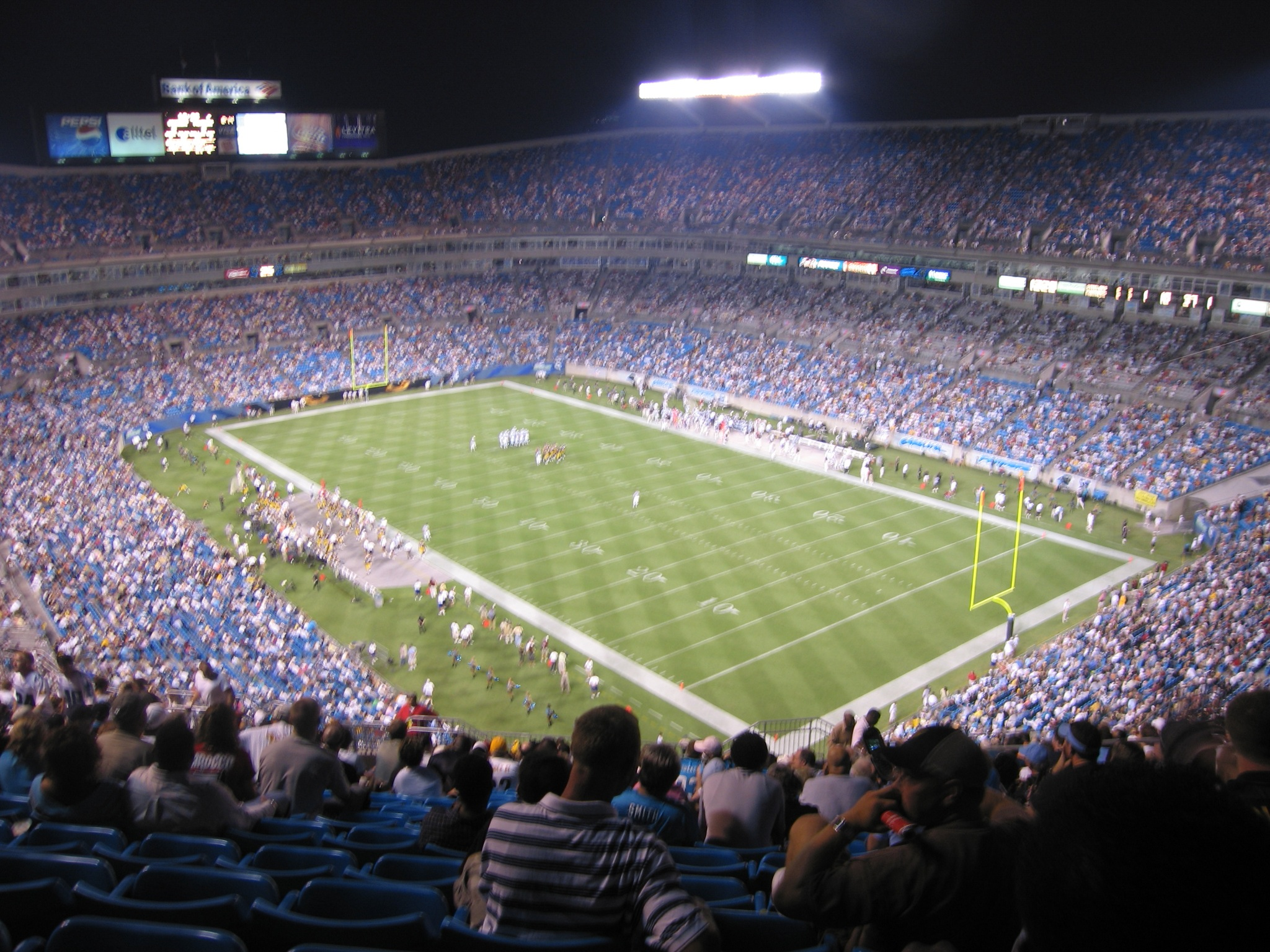
The preseason game between the Panthers and the eventual Super Bowl XL champion Pittsburgh Steelers at Bank of America Stadium in Charlotte, North Carolina, September 1, 2005.

The 2005 season was the Carolina Panthers' 11th in the National Football League (NFL) and their fourth under head coach John Fox. It was also the team's ninth season at Bank of America Stadium. They improved on their 7–9 record from 2004, going 11–5, and returned to the playoffs after a one-year absence following their Super Bowl appearance in 2003. They eventually fell to the Seattle Seahawks 34–14 in the NFC Championship Game.

== Offseason ==
=== NFL draft ===
2005 Carolina Panthers draft
| Round | Pick | Player | Position | College | Notes |
| 1 | 14 | Thomas Davis * | LB | Georgia | |
| 2 | 54 | Eric Shelton | RB | Louisville | |
| 3 | 79 | Evan Mathis * | OG | Alabama | |
| 3 | 89 | Atiyyah Ellison | DT | Missouri | |
| 4 | 121 | Stefan LeFors | QB | Louisville | |
| 5 | 149 | Adam Seward | LB | UNLV | |
| 5 | 169 | Geoff Hangartner | C | Texas A&M | |
| 5 | 171 | Ben Emanuel | S | UCLA | |
| 6 | 189 | Jovan Haye | DE | Vanderbilt | |
| 6 | 207 | Joe Berger | G | Michigan Tech | |
Made roster † Pro Football Hall of Fame * Made at least one Pro Bowl during career

== Personnel ==
2005 Carolina Panthers staff
| Front office: Owner/founder – Jerry Richardson; President – Mark Richardson; General manager – Marty Hurney; Director of college scouting – Tony Softli; Director of pro scouting – Mark Koncz; Head coaches: Head coach – John Fox; Offensive coaches: Offensive coordinator – Dan Henning; Running backs – Jim Skipper; Wide receivers – Richard Williamson; Tight ends – Dave Magazu; Offensive line – Mike Maser; Offensive assistant/quarterbacks – Mike McCoy | Defensive coaches: Defensive coordinator – Mike Trgovac; Defensive line – Sal Sunseri; Linebackers – Ken Flajole; Secondary – Rod Perry; Defensive assistant/safeties – Mike Gillhamer; Defensive assistant – Sam Mills III; Special teams coaches: Special teams coordinator – Danny Crossman; Special teams assistant – Paul Ferraro; Strength and conditioning: Strength and conditioning – Jerry Simmons |

== Roster ==
2005 Carolina Panthers roster
| Quarterbacks (QB): 17 Jake Delhomme; 15 Stefan LeFors; 16 Chris Weinke; Running backs (RB): 49 Casey Cramer FB; 26 DeShaun Foster; 37 Nick Goings; 45 Brad Hoover FB; 22 Jamal Robertson KR; 32 Rod Smart KR; Wide receivers (WR): 18 Drew Carter; 83 Keary Colbert; 88 Karl Hankton; 5 Efrem Hill; 81 Ricky Proehl; 89 Steve Smith; Tight ends (TE): 84 Michael Gaines; 86 Kris Mangum; 82 Mike Seidman | Offensive linemen (OL): 78 Todd Fordham OT; 69 Jordan Gross OT; 63 Geoff Hangartner C; 61 Dave Kadela OT; 71 Evan Mathis G; 60 Jeff Mitchell C; 76 Tutan Reyes G; 68 Mike Wahle G; 70 Travelle Wharton OT; Defensive linemen (DL): 99 Brentson Buckner DT; 67 Jordan Carstens DT; 98 Atiyyah Ellison DT; 92 Jovan Haye DE; 94 Kindal Moorehead DT; 90 Julius Peppers DE; 97 Kemp Rasmussen DE; 93 Mike Rucker DE; 96 Al Wallace DE | Linebackers (LB): 54 Vinny Ciurciu OLB; 52 Chris Draft MLB; 55 Dan Morgan MLB; 53 Brandon Short OLB; 57 Sean Tufts OLB; 54 Will Witherspoon OLB; Defensive backs (DB): 47 Thomas Davis SS; 20 Chris Gamble CB; 29 Jermaine Hardy FS; 21 Ken Lucas CB; 24 Ricky Manning CB; 27 Marlon McCree SS; 30 Mike Minter FS; 21 Dante Wesley CB; Special teams (ST): 7 Jason Baker P; 4 John Kasay K; 56 Jason Kyle LS | Practice squad: 95 Lorenzo Alexander DT; 46 David Bergeron LB; 25 Alex Haynes RB; 31 Billy Parker S; 64 Scott Peters G; 85 Chris Samp WR; 91 Khaleed Vaughn DE; 38 Garnell Wilds CB; Reserve: 33 Idrees Bashir S (IR); 28 Colin Branch S (IR); 48 Stephen Davis RB (IR); -- Scott Farley S (IR); 66 Matt Hill OT; 77 Kris Jenkins DT (IR); 59 Adam Seward LB (IR); 35 Eric Shelton RB (IR); Rookies in italics 53 active, 8 reserve, 8 practice squad |

== Regular season ==
=== Schedule ===
| Week | Date | Opponent | Result | Record | Venue | Attendance |
|---|---|---|---|---|---|---|
| 1 | September 11 | **New Orleans Saints** | **L** 20–23 | 0–1 | Bank of America Stadium | 72,920 |
| 2 | September 18 | New England Patriots | **W** 27–17 | 1–1 | Bank of America Stadium | 73,528 |
| 3 | September 25 | at Miami Dolphins | **L** 24–27 | 1–2 | Dolphins Stadium | 72,288 |
| 4 | October 3 | Green Bay Packers | **W** 32–29 | 2–2 | Bank of America Stadium | 73,657 |
| 5 | October 9 | at Arizona Cardinals | **W** 24–20 | 3–2 | Sun Devil Stadium | 38,809 |
| 6 | October 16 | at Detroit Lions | **W** 21–20 | 4–2 | Ford Field | 61,083 |
| 7 | Bye | | | | | |
| 8 | October 30 | Minnesota Vikings | **W** 38–13 | 5–2 | Bank of America Stadium | 73,502 |
| 9 | November 6 | at **Tampa Bay Buccaneers** | **W** 34–14 | 6–2 | Raymond James Stadium | 65,014 |
| 10 | November 13 | New York Jets | **W** 30–3 | 7–2 | Bank of America Stadium | 73,529 |
| 11 | November 20 | at Chicago Bears | **L** 3–13 | 7–3 | Soldier Field | 62,156 |
| 12 | November 27 | at Buffalo Bills | **W** 13–9 | 8–3 | Ralph Wilson Stadium | 71,440 |
| 13 | December 4 | **Atlanta Falcons** | **W** 24–6 | 9–3 | Bank of America Stadium | 73,661 |
| 14 | December 11 | **Tampa Bay Buccaneers** | **L** 10–20 | 9–4 | Bank of America Stadium | 73,467 |
| 15 | December 18 | at **New Orleans Saints** | **W** 27–10 | 10–4 | Tiger Stadium | 32,551 |
| 16 | December 24 | Dallas Cowboys | **L** 20–24 | 10–5 | Bank of America Stadium | 73,436 |
| 17 | January 1 | at **Atlanta Falcons** | **W** 44–11 | 11–5 | Georgia Dome | 70,796 |
Note: Intra-division opponents are in **bold** text.

=== Standings ===
NFC South
| | W | L | T | PCT | DIV | CONF | PF | PA | STK |
|---|---|---|---|---|---|---|---|---|---|
| ^{(3)} Tampa Bay Buccaneers | 11 | 5 | 0 | .688 | 5–1 | 9–3 | 300 | 274 | W2 |
| ^{(5)} Carolina Panthers | 11 | 5 | 0 | .688 | 4–2 | 8–4 | 391 | 259 | W1 |
| Atlanta Falcons | 8 | 8 | 0 | .500 | 2–4 | 5–7 | 351 | 341 | L3 |
| New Orleans Saints | 3 | 13 | 0 | .188 | 1–5 | 1–11 | 235 | 398 | L5 |

== Postseason ==
=== Schedule ===
| Week | Date | Opponent | Result | Record | Venue | Attendance |
|---|---|---|---|---|---|---|
| Wild Card | January 8 | at New York Giants (4) | W 23–0 | 1–0 | Giants Stadium | 79,378 |
| Divisional | January 15 | at Chicago Bears (2) | W 29–21 | 2–0 | Soldier Field | 62,209 |
| Conference | January 22 | at Seattle Seahawks (1) | L 14–34 | 2–1 | Qwest Field | 67,837 |

=== Wild Card Round ===
Carolina Panthers 23, New York Giants 0

| Quarter | 1 | 2 | 3 | 4 | Total |
|---|---|---|---|---|---|
| Panthers | 0 | 10 | 7 | 6 | 23 |
| Giants | 0 | 0 | 0 | 0 | 0 |

at Giants Stadium, East Rutherford, New Jersey

- Game time: 1:00 p.m. EST
- Game weather: Sunny, 44 °F (7 °C)
- Game attendance: 79,378
- Referee: Bill Leavy
- TV announcers (Fox): Joe Buck (play-by-play), Troy Aikman (color commentator), Pam Oliver and Chris Myers (sideline reporters)
- Recap, Game Book

Game information
First quarter
- No scoring plays

Second quarter

- CAR – Steve Smith 22-yard pass from Jake Delhomme (John Kasay kick), 9:41. Panthers 7–0. Drive: 12 plays, 77 yards, 7:46.
- CAR – John Kasay 31-yard field goal, 0:30. Panthers 10–0. Drive: 4 plays, 2 yards, 0:58.

Third quarter

- CAR – Steve Smith 12-yard run (John Kasay kick), 6:57. Panthers 17–0. Drive: 1 play, 12 yards, 0:06.

Fourth quarter

- CAR – John Kasay 45-yard field goal, 13:33. Panthers 20–0. Drive: 10 plays, 55 yards, 6:07.
- CAR – John Kasay 18-yard field goal, 2:40. Panthers 23–0. Drive: 14 plays, 55 yards, 8:55.

The Panthers forced five turnovers, limited the Giants to only 109 yards of total offense, and became the first club to shut out a home playoff team since the Los Angeles Rams shut out the Tampa Bay Buccaneers in the 1979 NFC Championship Game. Although the Giants entered the game with Pro Bowler Tiki Barber starting at running back, the Panthers running game, featuring DeShaun Foster and Nick Goings, outgained the Giants 223 yards to 41 on the ground. Carolina wide receiver Steve Smith caught 10 passes for 84 yards and scored two touchdowns, a 22-yard reception and a 12-yard run, while kicker John Kasay added three field goals and Foster rushed for 151 yards. Meanwhile, quarterback Eli Manning threw three interceptions in his first playoff start.

After the first five possessions of the game ended with punts, Carolina drove 77 yards in 12 plays and scored with Jake Delhomme's 22-yard touchdown pass to Smith. On Carolina's next possession, they were forced to punt, but New York safety Gibril Wilson muffed the kick and CB Dante Wesley recovered the ball at the Giants 15-yard line, setting up a 31-yard Kasay field goal to increase the lead to 10–0.

Carolina dominated the second half, intercepting Eli Manning three times. Midway through the third quarter, Ken Lucas intercepted a pass from Manning and returned it 14 yards to the Giants 12-yard line, setting up Delhomme's 12-yard touchdown pass to Smith on the next play. On New York's next drive, a 17-yard pass interference penalty on Lucas nullified his second interception and gave the Giants a first down at the Panthers 43-yard line. But two plays later, Manning's pass was intercepted by Marlon McCree at the 18. On the Panthers ensuing drive, Foster rushed three times for 44 yards, and Delhomme completed a 25-yard pass to Keary Colbert, moving the ball to the Giants 27-yard line where Kasay's 45-yard field goal made the score 20–0. Then five plays after the kickoff, McCree recorded his second interception on the Panthers 44-yard line. Carolina subsequently closed out the scoring with a 14-play, 55-yard drive that ended with Kasay's third field goal with 2:40 left in the game.

=== Divisional Round ===
Carolina Panthers 29, Chicago Bears 21

| Quarter | 1 | 2 | 3 | 4 | Total |
|---|---|---|---|---|---|
| Panthers | 7 | 9 | 7 | 6 | 29 |
| Bears | 0 | 7 | 7 | 7 | 21 |

at Soldier Field, Chicago

- Date: January 15, 2006
- Game time: 4:30 p.m. EST/3:30 p.m. CST
- Game weather: Partly cloudy, 42 °F (6 °C)
- Game attendance: 62,209
- Referee: Walt Coleman
- TV announcers (Fox): Joe Buck (play-by-play), Troy Aikman (color commentator), Pam Oliver and Chris Myers (sideline reporters)
- Recap, Game Book

Game information
First quarter
- CAR – Steve Smith 58-yard pass from Jake Delhomme (John Kasay kick), 14:05. Panthers 7–0. Drive: 2 plays, 60 yards, 0:55.

Second quarter

- CAR – John Kasay 20-yard field goal, 14:57. Panthers 10–0. Drive: 10 plays, 62 yards, 4:01.
- CAR – John Kasay 38-yard field goal, 6:26. Panthers 13–0. Drive: 8 plays, 40 yards, 4:26.
- CHI – Adrian Peterson 1-yard run (Robbie Gould kick), 1:57. Panthers 13–7. Drive: 9 plays, 67 yards, 4:29.
- CAR – John Kasay 37-yard field goal, 0:00. Panthers 16–7. Drive: 8 plays, 51 yards, 1:57.

Third quarter

- CHI – Desmond Clark 1-yard pass from Rex Grossman (Robbie Gould kick), 11:21. Panthers 16–14. Drive: 8 plays, 68 yards, 3:39.
- CAR – Steve Smith 39-yard pass from Jake Delhomme (John Kasay kick), 2:07. Panthers 23–14. Drive: 5 plays, 56 yards, 3:24.

Fourth quarter

- CHI – Jason McKie 3-yard run (Robbie Gould kick), 12:23. Panthers 23–21. Drive: 11 plays, 66 yards, 4:44.
- CAR – Kris Mangum 1-yard pass from Jake Delhomme (kick failed, hit right upright), 8:04. Panthers 29–21. Drive: 7 plays, 62 yards, 4:19.

The Panthers recorded 434 yards of total offense, and avenged a 13–3 regular season defeat by the Bears, to advance to their third NFC Championship Game in their eleven-year existence. Carolina receiver Steve Smith caught 12 passes for 219 yards and 2 touchdowns, the first coming 55 seconds into the contest, and rushed for 26 yards. Panthers kicker John Kasay contributed three second-quarter field goals, while quarterback Jake Delhomme threw for 319 yards and 3 touchdowns. The Panthers managed to hold off the Bears, however the team lost key running back DeShaun Foster to a broken ankle in the third quarter (which would severely cripple their running game in the NFC Championship match up to the Seahawks.)

The Panthers got the ball first and scored quickly. Jamal Robertson returned the opening kickoff 34 yards to the 40-yard line, and one play later, Delhomme threw a 58-yard touchdown pass to Smith. Later on, Smith's 46-yard reception set up a 20-yard field goal on the first play of the second quarter, increasing their lead to 10–0. On their next drive, Carolina had a chance to increase their lead even more after Delhomme completed passes to Drew Carter for gains of 14 and 29 yards, moving the ball to the Bears 23-yard line. But linebacker Brian Urlacher ended the drive by intercepting a pass from Delhomme at the 10. However, the Panthers forced another punt and scored with a second field goal from Kasay. Bears quarterback Rex Grossman completed 5 passes for 62 yards on a 67-yard drive that ended with a 1-yard touchdown run by Adrian Peterson cutting the score to 13–7. But Carolina stormed right back, driving 51 yards and scoring with Kasay's third field goal on the last play of the first half.

After the second half kickoff, a 24-yard run by Bears halfback Thomas Jones moved the ball to the Panthers 41-yard line. Then Grossman went to work, completing two passes to Bernard Berrian for 29 yards before finishing the drive with a 1-yard touchdown pass to tight end Desmond Clark. But after an exchange of punts, Delhomme threw a 39-yard touchdown pass to Smith, and the Panthers retook their 9-point lead.

Early in the fourth quarter, Chicago's Jason McKie scored a 3-yard touchdown run to cut their deficit to 23–21. But Delhomme led the Panthers right back, completing five passes for 45 yards and scoring with a 1-yard touchdown pass to tight end Kris Mangum. After an exchange of punts, the Bears drove into Carolina territory, but CB Ken Lucas put the game away by intercepting a pass from Grossman on the Panthers 22-yard line.

=== Conference Championship ===
Seattle Seahawks 34, Carolina Panthers 14

| Quarter | 1 | 2 | 3 | 4 | Total |
|---|---|---|---|---|---|
| Panthers | 0 | 7 | 0 | 7 | 14 |
| Seahawks | 10 | 10 | 7 | 7 | 34 |

at Qwest Field, Seattle, Washington

- Date: January 22, 2006
- Game time: 6:30 p.m. EST/3:30 p.m. PST
- Game weather: 48 °F (9 °C), cloudy
- Game attendance: 67,837
- Referee: Ed Hochuli
- TV announcers (Fox): Joe Buck (play-by-play), Troy Aikman (color commentator), Pam Oliver and Chris Myers (sideline reporters)
- Recap, Game Book

Game information
First quarter
- SEA – Jerramy Stevens 17-yard pass from Matt Hasselbeck (Josh Brown kick), 5:31. Seahawks 7–0. Drive: 5 plays, 57 yards, 2:16.
- SEA – Josh Brown 24-yard field goal, 2:23. Seahawks 10–0. Drive: 6 plays, 14 yards, 2:41.

Second quarter

- SEA – Shaun Alexander 1-yard run (Josh Brown kick), 14:53. Seahawks 17–0. Drive: 4 plays, 17 yards, 0:57.
- CAR – Steve Smith 59-yard punt return (John Kasay kick), 9:05. Seahawks 17–7.
- SEA – Josh Brown 39-yard field goal, 4:03. Seahawks 20–7. Drive: 10 plays, 57 yards, 4:59.

Third quarter

- SEA – Darrell Jackson 20-yard pass from Matt Hasselbeck (Josh Brown kick), 11:09. Seahawks 27–7. Drive: 8 plays, 65 yards, 3:51.

Fourth quarter

- SEA – Shaun Alexander 1-yard run (Josh Brown kick), 6:00. Seahawks 34–7. Drive: 8 plays, 53 yards, 4:48.
- CAR – Drew Carter 47-yard pass from Jake Delhomme (John Kasay kick), 5:09. Seahawks 34–14. Drive: 4 plays, 80 yards, 0:51.

The Seahawks forced four turnovers, and allowed only 36 rushing yards and 14 points, as they advanced to their first Super Bowl trip in the team's 30-year history. Meanwhile, running back Shaun Alexander, coming off his divisional round injury, rushed for a franchise playoff record 134 yards and 2 touchdowns.

Midway through the first quarter, the Seahawks drove 57 yards in five plays, featuring a 28-yard reception by Seneca Wallace, and scored with quarterback Matt Hasselbeck's 17-yard touchdown pass to Jerramy Stevens. Then three plays after the ensuing kickoff, linebacker Lofa Tatupu intercepted a pass from Jake Delhomme and returned it 22 yards to the Panthers 20-yard line, setting up a field goal from Josh Brown. The next time Carolina got the ball, Delhomme was intercepted again, this time by Marquand Manuel, who returned it 32 yards to the Panthers 17-yard line, setting up Alexander's 1-yard touchdown run that increased Seattle's lead to 17–0 on the first play of the second quarter. The Panthers eventually cut the score to 17–7 on Steve Smith's 59-yard punt return for a touchdown with 9:56 left in the first half.

The Seahawks scored another 17 unanswered points. On their first drive after the punt return touchdown, that moved the ball 57 yards and scored with a 39-yard field goal from Brown. Brown missed a field goal on the Seahawks next possession, but on the first drive of the second half, they score with Hasselbeck's 20-yard touchdown pass Darrell Jackson. Then in the fourth quarter, they put the game completely out of reach with a 53-yard drive that ended with Alexander's second touchdown. Carolina responded with a 47-yard touchdown pass from Delhomme to receiver Drew Carter, cutting the score to 34–14, but by then there was only 5 minutes left in the game.
