= Ken Lucas (American football) =

American football player (born 1979)

No. 21, 23, 31
- Position: Cornerback

Personal information
- Born: January 23, 1979 (age 47); Cleveland, Mississippi, U.S.
- Listed height: 6 ft 0 in (1.83 m)
- Listed weight: 205 lb (93 kg)

Career information
- High school: Cleveland (MS) East Side
- College: Ole Miss
- NFL draft: 2001: 2nd round, 40th overall pick

Career history
- Seattle Seahawks (2001–2004); Carolina Panthers (2005–2008); Seattle Seahawks (2009)

Awards and highlights
- All-American (2000); Second-team All-SEC (2000)

Career NFL statistics
- Total tackles: 533
- Forced fumbles: 3
- Fumble recoveries: 7
- Pass deflections: 110
- Interceptions: 25
- Defensive touchdowns: 2
- Stats at Pro Football Reference

Kenyatta Cornelius Lucas (born January 23, 1979) is an American former professional football player who was a cornerback in the National Football League (NFL). He was selected by the Seattle Seahawks in the second round of the 2001 NFL draft. He played college football for the Ole Miss Rebels. In 2004 he was the NFC co-leader in interceptions.

Lucas has also played for the Carolina Panthers.

== Early life ==
Lucas attended East Side High School in Cleveland, Mississippi, where he garnered first-team all-district honors at wide receiver and kick returner and all-county recognition at wide receiver and cornerback playing alongside former Seattle Seahawks offensive lineman Floyd "Pork Chop" Womack. He was selected the district rookie of the year as a freshman and named the team's most outstanding player as a junior and most valuable player as a senior. Lucas also lettered four times in baseball, finishing with a .395 career batting average. He graduated from East Side in 1997.

== College career ==
Lucas began playing at the University of Mississippi as a wide receiver before moving to defensive back late in his sophomore season. He finished his college career with 87 tackles, seven interceptions and 33 passes defensed on defense; in addition, he totaled 23 catches for 292 yards and one touchdown and four carries for 73 yards on offense. Lucas returned 20 kickoffs for 383 yards and one punt for 17 yards, had nine tackles and blocked two punts on special teams.

== Professional career ==
=== Pre-draft ===
He attended the annual NFL Scouting Combine, but opted to not participate in any physical drills. NFL analysts and scouts projected Lucas to be selected late in the first round or early in second round pick in the 2001 NFL Draft. ESPN draft analyst Mel Kiper Jr. had Lucas ranked as the fourth best cornerback prospect in the draft. Pro Football Weekly also ranked Lucas as the fourth best cornerback prospect. The Herald-Times and United Press International ranked Lucas as the fifth best cornerback prospect available in the draft. The San Francisco Chronicle listed him as the sixth best cornerback amongst his position group in the draft.

Pre-draft measurables
Height	Weight
6 ft 0 1/4 in (1.84 m)	200 lb (91 kg)
Values from NFL Combine

=== Seattle Seahawks (first stint) ===
The Seattle Seahawks selected Lucas in the second round (40th overall) of the 2001 NFL draft. He was the fifth cornerback drafted in 2001 and also became the highest drafted defensive back from Ole Miss in the history of the NFL draft, surpassing 1996 second round pick (47th overall) Fred Thomas, who was coincidentally also selected by the Seattle Seahawks.

==== 2001 ====
On July 26, 2001, the Seattle Seahawks signed Lucas to a four–year, $2.98 million rookie contract that included a signing bonus of $1.39 million.

Throughout training camp, Lucas competed against Ike Charlton for a role as a starting cornerback. On August 11, 2001, No. 1 starting cornerback Shawn Springs tore his left hamstring in the Seahawks' preseason-opener during the second quarter of a 21–28 loss at the Indianapolis Colts. The following week, No. 2 starting cornerback Willie Williams fractured his forearm during a 13–16 overtime loss to the Arizona Cardinals. On September 1, 2001, nickelback Ike Charlton injured his knee during a 28–14 victory against the New Orleans Saints in the Seahawks' preseason finale and was expected to miss anywhere from 2–10 weeks. Head coach Mike Holmgren reluctantly named Lucas and backup Paul Miranda as the starting cornerbacks for the beginning of the season. Lucas had no experience starting as a rookie and Miranda had never earned a start in the regular season as he primarily was used as a backup and special teams player.

On September 9, 2001, Lucas made his professional regular season debut and earned his first career start in the Seattle Seahawks' season-opener at the Cleveland Browns and recorded three solo tackles and set a season-high with four pass deflections as they won 9–6. He broke up a pass attempt Tim Couch threw to wide receiver Quincy Wilson on third down to seal the Seahawks' victory. On November 26, 2001, the NFL issued a four–game suspension to Shawn Springs for violating the league's wellness policy against anabolic steroids and other substances after he failed a test for anabolic steroids. He finished his rookie season with a total of 49 combined tackles (41 solo), 15 pass deflections, a fumble recovery, and one interception in 16 games and eight starts.

==== 2002 ====
He entered training camp as a candidate to earn a spot as a starting cornerback, along with Doug Evans, due to Shawn Springs continued recovery from a hamstring injury and the Seahawks trading Ike Charlton to the Jacksonville Jaguars. Head coach Mike Holmgren named Lucas and Shawn Springs as the starting cornerbacks to begin the season, alongside Willie Williams as the starting nickelback.

On September 8, 2002, Lucas started in the Seattle Seahawks' season-opener at the Oakland Raiders and set a career-high 12 combined tackles (seven solo) in a 17–31 loss. In Week 13, Lucas made six combined tackles (five solo), one pass deflection, and intercepted a pass Jeff Garcia threw to wide receiver Tai Streets during a 24–31 loss at the San Francisco 49ers. On December 15, 2002, Lucas made three solo tackles, two pass deflections, and set a season-high with two interceptions off passes thrown by Michael Vick during a 30–24 overtime victory at the Atlanta Falcons. In Week 17, he set a season-high with nine solo tackles and recorded three pass deflections during a 31–28 overtime victory at the San Diego Chargers. He started in all 16 games throughout the 2002 NFL season for the first time in his career and set a career-high with 82 combined tackles (71 solo) while also making 12 pass deflections and three interceptions.

On December 31, 2002, the Seattle Seahawks removed Mike Holmgren from his position as General Manager after they finished the seasons with a 7–9 record. In response, Holmgren fired five members of his coaching staff, including defensive coordinator Steve Sidwell.

==== 2003 ====
On February 4, 2003, the Seattle Seahawks hired Ray Rhodes to be their new defensive coordinator. The Seahawks selected cornerback Marcus Trufant in the first round (11th overall) of the 2003 NFL draft. Lucas commented that he took it personally when the Seahawks decided to take Trufant in the first round. Throughout training camp, Lucas and Trufant competed for the spot as the No. 2 starting cornerback. On August 8, 2003, No. 1 starting cornerback Shawn Springs fractured his right shoulder bone in the first preseason game as the Seahawks defeated the St. Louis Rams 20–7. Head coach Mike Holmgren subsequently named Lucas the No. 1 starting cornerback to begin the season, alongside rookie Marcus Trufant. In Week 2, he set a season-high with nine combined tackles (eight solo) as the during a 32–0 victory at the Arizona Cardinals. He was inactive for two games (Weeks 7–8) after spraining his ankle during a 20–19 victory against the San Francisco 49ers in Week 6. Upon returning from injury, Lucas was demoted to being the primary backup as the third cornerback on the depth chart after he was supplanted by Shawn Springs. On November 30, 2003, Lucas recorded seven combined tackles (five solo), set a season-high with three pass deflections, and had his lone interception of the season on a pass Kelly Holcomb threw to wide receiver André Davis during a 34–7 victory against the Cleveland Browns. He finished with 62 combined tackles (52 solo), 12 pass deflections, one forced fumble, a fumble recovery, and an interception in 14 games and 7 starts.

==== 2004 ====
Throughout training camp, Lucas competed against Bobby Taylor for the role as the No. 2 starting cornerback following the departures of Shawn Springs, Willie Williams, and Doug Evans. Head coach Mike Holmgren named Lucas and Marcus Trufant as the starting cornerback duo to begin the season with Bobby Taylor as the nickelback.

In Week 3, he recorded six combined tackles (five solo), set a season-high with three pass deflections, and intercepted a pass Ken Dorsey to wide receiver Rashaun Woods as they routed the San Francisco 49ers 0–34. On October 24, 2004, Lucas made six solo tackles, two pass deflections, and intercepted a pass Josh McCown threw to wide receiver Freddie Jones and returned it for 21–yards to score the first touchdown of his career to take the lead in the fourth quarter 17–16 against the Arizona Cardinals in the fourth quarter. The Seahawks would go on to lose 17–25 after quarterback Matt Hasselbeck threw two interceptions late in the fourth quarter. On November 10, 2004, Lucas made five solo tackles, two pass deflections, and set a season-high with two interceptions off passes Marc Bulger threw to wide receivers Torry Holt and Isaac Bruce during a 27–44 overtime loss to the St. Louis Rams. The following week, he set a season-high with nine combined tackles (eight solo) and had one pass break-up during a 20–30 loss at the New England Patriots in Week 6. In Week 9, Lucas had one pass break-up before he was carted off-the-field in the second quarter of a 42–27 win at the San Francisco 49ers after he apparently suffered an injury breaking up a pass to Brandon Lloyd that resulted in him falling and then slamming into the turf field with Brandon Lloyd on top of him. On November 8, 2004, Lucas was released from a Bay area hospital with a bruised lung and was expected to miss a few games before returning. In Week 16, Lucas made four combined tackles (three solo), two pass deflections, and tied his career-high with his sixth interception of the season on a pass Josh McCown threw to wide receiver Larry Fitzgerald as the Seahawks defeated the Arizona Cardinals 20–24. He started in all 16 games during the 2004 NFL season and finished with a total of 70 combined tackles (62 solo), 21 pass deflections, six interceptions, two fumble recoveries, and a touchdown.

=== Carolina Panthers ===
==== 2005 ====
On March 4, 2005, the Carolina Panthers signed Lucas to a six–year, $36.50 million contract that included an initial signing bonus of $13 million. The Panthers were the first team Lucas had a visit scheduled with at the start of free agency. It was reported by a source that the Panthers were not actually intending to have a visit and meet with Lucas, but were actually meeting for his contract signing.

He entered training camp slated as the No. 2 starting cornerback, taking over for Ricky Manning, who was assigned the role of starting nickelback under defensive coordinator Mike Trgovac. Head coach John Fox named Lucas and Chris Gamble the starting cornerbacks to begin the season, along with Ricky Manning at nickelback.

In Week 2, he set a season-high ten solo tackles and made one pass deflection during a 21–17 victory against the New England Patriots. He injured his shoulder during the game and was inactive as the Panthers lost 24–27 at the Miami Dolphins. On October 9, 2005, Lucas recorded five solo tackles, set a season-high with four pass deflections, and recovered a fumble that linebacker Thomas Davis Sr. forced by wide receiver Anquan Boldin during a 24–20 victory at the Arizona Cardinals. On November 13, 2005, Lucas made three solo tackles, two pass deflections, and set a season-high with two interceptions on passes Brooks Bollinger threw to wide receiver Laveranues Coles as the Panthers routed the New York Jets 3–30. In Week 14, he set a career-high with 12 combined tackles (ten solo) and had one pass break-up during a 10–20 loss to the Tampa Bay Buccaneers. He finished the 2005 NFL season with 69 combined tackles (62 solo), 15 pass deflections, and tied his career-high with of six interceptions in 15 games and 15 starts.

==== 2006 ====
The Carolina Panthers selected cornerback Richard Marshall in the second round (58th overall) of the 2006 NFL draft following the departure of Ricky Manning. Head coach John Fox named Lucas and Chris Gamble as the starting cornerbacks to begin the season with Richard Marshall at nickelback. Throughout the season, Lucas' ability to perform was hampered due to multiple injuries, including to his shoulder, neck, and groin. He was demoted to being a backup cornerback in lieu of rookie Richard Marshall as the Panthers defeated the New Orleans Saints 21–19 in Week 4, but reclaimed his starting role immediately the week afterwards. He would injured his thigh and was sidelined for two games (Weeks 11–12). He also would be sidelined for a 13–27 loss to the New York Giants in Week 14 due to his thigh injury. On December 24, 2006, Lucas recorded four combined tackles (three solo), set a season-high with three pass deflections, and intercepted a pass Michael Vick threw to fullback Fred McCrary during a 10–3 victory at the Atlanta Falcons. He completed the 2006 NFL season with 45 combined tackles (31 solo), ten pass deflections, and made three interceptions in 13 games and 12 starts.

==== 2007 ====
Lucas and Chris Gamble returned as the starting cornerbacks under defensive coordinator Mike Trgovac in 2007. In Week 3, starting quarterback Jake Delhomme injured his elbow during a 27–20 victory at the Atlanta Falcons and was placed on season-ending injured reserve, effectively ending the possibility of a successful season. In Week 5, he set a season-high with nine solo tackles and made two pass deflections during a 16–13 victory at the New Orleans Saints. On November 4, 2007, Lucas made three combined tackles (two solo), set a season-high with four pass deflections, and intercepted a pass Vince Young threw to wide receiver Roydell Williams during a 7–20 loss at the Tennessee Titans. In Week 10, Lucas made five solo tackles, three pass deflections, and returned a fumble recovery for the second and final touchdown of his career during a 20–13 loss to the Atlanta Falcons. During the second quarter, Lucas recovered a fumble that was caused after safety Chris Harris (safety) forced a fumble by wide receiver Laurent Robinson and returned it for a 27–yard touchdown, tying the game 7–7 following a PAT. He started in all 16 games throughout the 2007 NFL season and recorded 62 combined tackles (58 solo), 13 pass deflections, two interceptions, two fumble recoveries, and scored one touchdown.

==== 2008 ====
During training camp for the 2008 season, Lucas was involved in an altercation with Panthers star receiver Steve Smith. Smith blackened Lucas' eye and broke his nose during the scuffle. Ken Lucas was praised by numerous people for forgiving Smith completely.

On March 11, 2009, the Panthers released Lucas to clear about $2.3 million in salary cap space.

=== Seattle Seahawks (second stint) ===
After four seasons in Carolina, Lucas re-signed with the Seattle Seahawks on April 27, 2009.

== NFL career statistics ==
Legend
**Bold**	Career high

=== Regular season ===
Year	Team	Games		Tackles					Interceptions					Fumbles			
Year	Team	GP	GS	Cmb	Solo	Ast	Sck	TFL	Int	Yds	TD	Lng	PD	FF	FR	Yds	TD
2001	SEA	**16**	8	49	44	5	0.0	0	1	0	0	0	15	0	1	0	0
2002	SEA	**16**	**16**	**82**	**71**	11	0.0	**3**	3	67	0	40	12	**1**	0	0	0
2003	SEA	14	7	62	52	10	0.0	1	1	27	0	27	12	**1**	1	24	0
2004	SEA	**16**	**16**	70	62	8	0.0	2	**6**	46	**1**	25	**21**	**1**	**2**	3	0
2005	CAR	15	15	69	62	7	0.0	**3**	**6**	70	0	32	15	0	1	24	0
2006	CAR	13	12	45	31	**14**	0.0	0	3	13	0	13	10	0	0	0	0
2007	CAR	**16**	**16**	62	58	4	0.0	2	2	1	0	1	13	0	**2**	**43**	**1**
2008	CAR	**16**	**16**	60	53	7	0.0	1	2	**74**	0	**43**	10	0	0	0	0
2009	SEA	**16**	6	34	28	6	0.0	0	1	0	0	0	2	0	0	0	0
		138	112	533	461	72	0.0	12	25	298	1	43	110	3	7	94	1

=== Playoffs ===
Year	Team	Games		Tackles					Interceptions					Fumbles			
Year	Team	GP	GS	Cmb	Solo	Ast	Sck	TFL	Int	Yds	TD	Lng	PD	FF	FR	Yds	TD
2003	SEA	1	0	7	4	**3**	0.0	0	0	0	0	0	0	0	0	0	0
2004	SEA	1	1	4	4	0	0.0	0	0	0	0	0	2	0	0	0	0
2005	CAR	**3**	**3**	**13**	**11**	2	0.0	0	**2**	**15**	0	**14**	**4**	0	0	0	0
2008	CAR	1	1	6	5	1	0.0	0	0	0	0	0	0	0	0	0	0
		6	5	30	24	6	0.0	0	2	15	0	14	6	0	0	0	0
