= List of Ole Miss Rebels in the NFL draft =

This is a list of Ole Miss Rebels football players in the NFL draft.

== Key ==
B	Back	K	Kicker	NT	Nose tackle
C	Center	LB	Linebacker	FB	Fullback
DB	Defensive back	P	Punter	HB	Halfback
DE	Defensive end	QB	Quarterback	WR	Wide receiver
DT	Defensive tackle	RB	Running back	G	Guard
E	End	T	Offensive tackle	TE	Tight end

== Selections ==
Year	Round	Pick	Player	Team	Position
1937	7	64	Jim Poole	New York Giants	E
1938	3	18	Frank Kinard	Brooklyn Dodgers	T
1939	1	3	Parker Hall	Cleveland Rams	B
1939	10	85	Kimble Bradley	Brooklyn Dodgers	B
1940	19	172	Bill Schneller	Philadelphia Eagles	B
1941	13	118	George Kinard	Brooklyn Dodgers	G
1941	14	121	Les Dodson	Philadelphia Eagles	B
1942	1	8	Merle Hapes	New York Giants	B
1942	18	168	John Hovious	New York Giants	B
1943	12	110	Dan Wood	Washington Redskins	C
1943	14	130	Oscar Britt	Washington Redskins	G
1944	13	125	Ray Poole	New York Giants	E
1944	15	147	Ollie Poole	New York Giants	E
1945	13	127	Charlie Conerly	Washington Redskins	QB
1946	14	123	Bob McCain	Pittsburgh Steelers	E
1946	26	243	Clarence Castle	Pittsburgh Steelers	B
1946	32	299	Mike Campbell	Washington Redskins	E
1947	8	65	Houston Smith	Chicago Bears	E
1948	6	36	Bill Erickson	New York Giants	T
1948	29	268	Buddy Bowen	Washington Redskins	B
1949	5	47	Earl Howell	Los Angeles Rams	B
1949	11	109	Jerry Tiblier	Chicago Bears	B
1949	11	111	Bobby Wilson	Philadelphia Eagles	B
1949	20	196	Ben Mann	Pittsburgh Steelers	G
1950	2	24	John Dottley	Chicago Bears	B
1950	9	118	Bobby "Red" Wilson	Philadelphia Eagles	B
1950	20	258	Jim Crawford	Chicago Bears	G
1950	21	267	Bill Stribling	New York Giants	E
1951	6	68	Ken Farragut	Philadelphia Eagles	C
1952	5	53	Mel Sinquefield	Boston Yanks	C
1952	10	118	Carl West	San Francisco 49ers	B
1952	20	239	Rex Boggan	New York Giants	T
1952	21	250	Arnold Boykin	Detroit Lions	B
1952	23	271	Ken Barfield	Washington Redskins	T
1952	23	274	Hal Maxwell	Detroit Lions	E
1953	6	68	Kline Gilbert	Chicago Bears	T
1953	14	162	Charley Montgomery	Pittsburgh Steelers	T
1953	16	183	Jimmy Lear	Chicago Cardinals	B
1953	16	184	Jim Slay	Washington Redskins	E
1953	18	214	Marv Trauth	Philadelphia Eagles	T
1953	23	270	Jim Mask	Chicago Bears	E
1954	1	10	Ed Beatty	Los Angeles Rams	C
1954	18	209	Crawford Mims	New York Giants	G
1954	23	268	Pete Mangum	New York Giants	B
1954	23	273	Harold Lofton	Philadelphia Eagles	B
1955	8	92	Jimmy Patton	New York Giants	B
1955	10	116	Lea Paslay	New York Giants	B
1955	21	252	Jim Walters	Detroit Lions	T
1956	2	25	Billy Kinard	Cleveland Browns	B
1956	13	153	Eddie Crawford	New York Giants	B
1956	15	176	Buddy Alliston	Green Bay Packers	G
1956	17	195	Dick Weiss	San Francisco 49ers	T
1956	17	203	Eagle Day	Washington Redskins	QB
1956	18	208	Billy Yelverton	San Francisco 49ers	T
1956	23	273	Bob McCool	New York Giants	B
1956	26	308	Dick Goehe	Green Bay Packers	T
1957	7	78	Gene Hickerson	Cleveland Browns	T
1957	17	205	Jerry Stone	New York Giants	C
1957	22	256	Paige Cothren	Los Angeles Rams	B
1958	5	50	Ray Brown	Baltimore Colts	B
1958	6	70	Billy Lott	New York Giants	B
1958	12	140	Leroy Reed	Pittsburgh Steelers	B
1958	16	190	John West	New York Giants	T
1958	20	232	Kent Lovelace	Philadelphia Eagles	B
1958	21	246	Jackie Simpson	Washington Redskins	G
1958	23	268	Billy Templeton	Philadelphia Eagles	E
1958	23	273	Billy Hurst	New York Giants	B
1959	5	60	Don Churchwell	Baltimore Colts	G
1959	12	142	Charlie Flowers	New York Giants	B
1959	13	156	Rudi Smith	Baltimore Colts	T
1959	19	228	Milt Crain	Baltimore Colts	C
1959	20	233	Billy Brewer	Washington Redskins	B
1960	2	24	Marvin Terrell	Baltimore Colts	G
1960	4	41	Johnny Brewer	Cleveland Browns	TE
1960	6	69	Robert Khayat	Cleveland Browns	G
1960	6	72	George Blair	New York Giants	B
1960	9	104	Ken Kirk	Chicago Bears	C
1960	11	127	Bobby Franklin	Cleveland Browns	DB
1960	15	178	Larry Grantham	Baltimore Colts	E
1961	1	10	Bobby Crespino	Cleveland Browns	E
1961	5	67	Jerry Daniels	New York Giants	E
1961	8	109	Allen Green	New York Giants	C
1961	9	125	Jake Gibbs	Cleveland Browns	QB
1961	11	151	Bob Benton	New York Giants	T
1961	13	171	Doug Elmore	Washington Redskins	B
1961	15	209	Charley Taylor	Cleveland Browns	B
1962	3	36	Billy Adams	San Francisco 49ers	RB
1962	4	54	Glynn Griffing	New York Giants	QB
1962	5	58	Bookie Bolin	New York Giants	G
1962	5	65	Chuck Morris	Green Bay Packers	B
1962	6	76	Jerry Brown	San Francisco 49ers	G
1962	8	111	Ralph Smith	Philadelphia Eagles	E
1962	9	120	Jim Roberts	San Francisco 49ers	T
1963	1	3	Jim Dunaway	Minnesota Vikings	T
1963	3	40	Louis Guy	Philadelphia Eagles	B
1963	4	48	Whaley Hall	Dallas Cowboys	T
1963	9	124	Ken Dill	Detroit Lions	LB
1964	4	45	Perry Lee Dunn	Dallas Cowboys	QB
1964	9	114	Larry Smith	Philadelphia Eagles	B
1964	10	135	Bobby Robinson	Cleveland Browns	G
1964	15	208	Chuck Hinton	New York Giants	G
1964	19	264	Frank Kinard	New York Giants	B
1964	20	268	Tommy Lucas	Philadelphia Eagles	G
1965	3	38	Allen Brown	Green Bay Packers	E
1965	5	59	Jim Harvey	Green Bay Packers	T
1965	5	62	Frank Lambert	New York Giants	E
1965	5	69	Bill Irwin	Cleveland Browns	T
1965	9	124	Jimmy Heidel	St. Louis Cardinals	B
1966	1	11	Stan Hindman	San Francisco 49ers	T
1966	3	33	Mike Dennis	Atlanta Falcons	RB
1966	4	53	Billy Clay	Washington Redskins	DB
1966	15	230	Lee Garner	Baltimore Colts	LB
1967	5	124	Gerald Warfield	Oakland Raiders	RB
1967	6	145	Doug Cunningham	San Francisco 49ers	RB
1967	8	207	Tommy Luke	Buffalo Bills	DB
1967	15	370	Marvin McQueen	Houston Oilers	LB
1968	2	35	Jimmy Keyes	Miami Dolphins	LB
1968	2	49	Mac Haik	Houston Oilers	WR
1968	3	62	Jim Urbanek	Miami Dolphins	T
1968	3	75	Bob Vaughn	Denver Broncos	T
1968	4	103	Dan Sartin	New Orleans Saints	T
1968	4	106	Alan Bush	Chicago Bears	G
1968	7	179	Jerry Richardson	San Francisco 49ers	LB
1968	9	239	Wayne McClure	Kansas City Chiefs	LB
1968	12	304	Bobby Hendrix	Denver Broncos	T
1970	5	106	Glenn Cannon	New Orleans Saints	DB
1970	7	181	Hap Farber	Minnesota Vikings	LB
1970	9	233	George Morrow	Minnesota Vikings	DE
1970	16	410	Claude Herard	New York Jets	DT
1970	17	430	Julian Fagan	Houston Oilers	P
1971	1	2	Archie Manning	New Orleans Saints	QB
1971	4	88	Wimpy Winther	New Orleans Saints	C
1971	4	103	Adam Mitchell	Dallas Cowboys	T
1971	5	128	Fred Brister	Pittsburgh Steelers	LB
1971	6	151	Dennis Coleman	Miami Dolphins	LB
1971	6	154	Wyck Neely	Philadelphia Eagles	DB
1971	7	164	Worthy McClure	Pittsburgh Steelers	T
1971	11	266	Vernon Studdard	New York Jets	WR
1971	12	295	Floyd Franks	Denver Broncos	WR
1972	6	136	Elmer Allen	Houston Oilers	LB
1972	11	267	Paul Dongieux	New Orleans Saints	LB
1972	13	326	Preston Carpenter	Philadelphia Eagles	DE
1973	10	241	William Barry	Chicago Bears	WR
1974	4	99	Norris Weese	Los Angeles Rams	QB
1974	7	162	Burney Veszey	New York Jets	TE
1975	16	392	Bill Malouf	Baltimore Colts	QB
1976	3	78	Ben Williams	Buffalo Bills	DE
1976	9	242	James Reed	Cleveland Browns	RB
1976	11	305	Paul Hofer	San Francisco 49ers	RB
1978	6	156	Ken Coleman	New England Patriots	LB
1978	7	172	George Plasketes	Green Bay Packers	LB
1979	9	241	Curtis Weathers	Cleveland Browns	TE
1979	11	302	Eddie Cole	Detroit Lions	LB
1980	3	65	Jim Miller	San Francisco 49ers	P
1981	7	185	Ken Toler	New England Patriots	WR
1981	9	247	Chuck Commiskey	Philadelphia Eagles	DB
1983	10	255	Melvin Brown	Minnesota Vikings	DB
1983	11	301	Mike Harmon	New York Jets	WR
1984	2	46	Andre Townsend	Denver Broncos	DE
1984	11	286	Buford McGee	San Diego Chargers	RB
1985	1	18	Freddie Nunn	St. Louis Cardinals	DE
1985	3	79	Tim Moffett	Los Angeles Raiders	WR
1985	5	129	Lee Davis	Cincinnati Bengals	DB
1985	7	173	James Harbour	Indianapolis Colts	WR
1985	8	219	Barry Wilburn	Washington Redskins	DB
1986	10	250	Benton Reed	Tampa Bay Buccaneers	DE
1986	12	312	Kent Austin	St. Louis Cardinals	QB
1987	7	191	Bill Smith	Green Bay Packers	P
1987	9	245	Jonathan Shelley	San Francisco 49ers	DB
1987	11	294	Mario Perry	Los Angeles Raiders	TE
1988	4	96	J. R. Ambrose	Kansas City Chiefs	WR
1988	9	234	Todd Irvin	Detroit Lions	T
1988	9	243	Jeff Herrod	Indianapolis Colts	LB
1989	2	56	Wesley Walls	San Francisco 49ers	TE
1989	7	181	Stevon Moore	New York Jets	DB
1989	10	272	Rodney Lowe	New York Giants	DE
1989	12	317	Joe Mickles	Washington Redskins	RB
1990	1	18	Tony Bennett	Green Bay Packers	LB
1990	8	194	Willie Green	Detroit Lions	WR
1990	9	237	Pat Coleman	Houston Oilers	WR
1991	1	20	Kelvin Pritchett	Dallas Cowboys	DT
1991	4	92	Randy Baldwin	Minnesota Vikings	RB
1992	3	79	Tyji Armstrong	Tampa Bay Buccaneers	TE
1992	8	219	Vincent Brownlee	New York Jets	WR
1993	5	133	Everett Lindsay	Minnesota Vikings	T
1993	8	199	Chadrick Brown	Phoenix Cardinals	DE
1993	8	211	Marquise Thomas	Indianapolis Colts	LB
1994	1	20	Tim Bowens	Miami Dolphins	DT
1994	4	131	DeWayne Dotson	Dallas Cowboys	LB
1995	4	117	Jeff Miller	Green Bay Packers	T
1995	4	129	Alundis Brice	Dallas Cowboys	DB
1995	5	145	Roell Preston	Atlanta Falcons	WR
1995	5	158	Norman Hand	Miami Dolphins	DT
1996	2	47	Fred Thomas	Seattle Seahawks	DB
1997	7	228	Kris Mangum	Carolina Panthers	TE
1998	1	29	John Avery	Miami Dolphins	RB
1998	7	219	Nate Wayne	Denver Broncos	LB
2000	2	53	Todd Wade	Miami Dolphins	T
2000	3	72	Kendrick Clancy	Pittsburgh Steelers	DT
2000	5	131	Tutan Reyes	New Orleans Saints	T
2001	1	23	Deuce McAllister	New Orleans Saints	RB
2001	2	40	Ken Lucas	Seattle Seahawks	DB
2001	3	63	Derrick Burgess	Philadelphia Eagles	DE
2002	3	93	Terrence Metcalf	Chicago Bears	G
2003	5	157	Ben Claxton	Denver Broncos	C
2004	1	1	Eli Manning	San Diego Chargers	QB
2004	4	123	Stacy Andrews	Cincinnati Bengals	T
2004	6	173	Von Hutchins	Indianapolis Colts	DB
2004	6	200	Charlie Anderson	Houston Texans	LB
2005	1	26	Chris Spencer	Seattle Seahawks	C
2005	2	49	Marcus Johnson	Minnesota Vikings	T
2005	7	221	Rick Razzano	Tampa Bay Buccaneers	RB
2006	6	186	Tre' Stallings	Kansas City Chiefs	G
2007	1	11	Patrick Willis	San Francisco 49ers	LB
2007	7	221	Trumaine McBride	Chicago Bears	DB
2009	1	23	Michael Oher	Baltimore Ravens	T
2009	1	24	Peria Jerry	Atlanta Falcons	DT
2009	3	84	Mike Wallace	Pittsburgh Steelers	WR
2009	7	231	Jamarca Sanford	Minnesota Vikings	DB
2010	2	36	Dexter McCluster	Kansas City Chiefs	RB
2010	3	73	John Jerry	Miami Dolphins	G
2010	5	136	Kendrick Lewis	Kansas City Chiefs	DB
2010	6	175	Greg Hardy	Carolina Panthers	DE
2011	6	199	Jerrell Powe	Kansas City Chiefs	DT
2012	4	112	Bobby Massie	Arizona Cardinals	T
2014	3	90	Donte Moncrief	Indianapolis Colts	WR
2015	2	56	Senquez Golson	Pittsburgh Steelers	DB
2016	1	13	Laremy Tunsil	Miami Dolphins	T
2016	1	23	Laquon Treadwell	Minnesota Vikings	WR
2016	1	29	Robert Nkemdiche	Arizona Cardinals	DT
2016	5	174	Fahn Cooper	San Francisco 49ers	T
2016	6	199	Cody Core	Cincinnati Bengals	WR
2017	1	23	Evan Engram	New York Giants	TE
2017	6	198	D. J. Jones	San Francisco 49ers	DT
2017	6	204	Derrick Jones	New York Jets	DB
2017	7	253	Chad Kelly	Denver Broncos	QB
2018	2	46	Breeland Speaks	Kansas City Chiefs	DE
2018	4	136	Marquis Haynes	Carolina Panthers	DE
2018	5	169	Jordan Wilkins	Indianapolis Colts	RB
2018	7	252	Rod Taylor	Cincinnati Bengals	G
2019	2	37	Greg Little	Carolina Panthers	T
2019	2	51	A. J. Brown	Tennessee Titans	WR
2019	2	64	DK Metcalf	Seattle Seahawks	WR
2019	3	96	Dawson Knox	Buffalo Bills	TE
2019	7	246	Javon Patterson	Indianapolis Colts	G
2019	7	252	Ken Webster	New England Patriots	DB
2021	2	34	Elijah Moore	New York Jets	WR
2021	4	142	Royce Newman	Green Bay Packers	G
2022	2	56	Sam Williams	Dallas Cowboys	DE
2022	3	94	Matt Corral	Carolina Panthers	QB
2022	5	154	Snoop Conner	Jacksonville Jaguars	RB
2022	6	219	Chance Campbell	Tennessee Titans	LB
2022	7	225	Mark Robinson	Pittsburgh Steelers	LB
2022	7	236	Deane Leonard	Los Angeles Chargers	DB
2023	2	39	Jonathan Mingo	Carolina Panthers	WR
2023	4	124	Tavius Robinson	Baltimore Ravens	LB
2023	6	215	Zach Evans	Los Angeles Rams	RB
2023	7	230	Nick Broeker	Buffalo Bills	T
2024	5	153	Deantre Prince	Jacksonville Jaguars	DB
2024	6	214	Cedric Johnson	Cincinnati Bengals	DE
2024	7	224	Daijahn Anthony	Cincinnati Bengals	DB
2025	1	16	Walter Nolen	Arizona Cardinals	DT
2025	1	25	Jaxson Dart	New York Giants	QB
2025	2	55	Tre Harris	Los Angeles Chargers	WR
2025	2	61	Trey Amos	Washington Commanders	CB
2025	3	77	Princely Umanmielen	Carolina Panthers	DE
2025	4	138	Jordan Watkins	San Francisco 49ers	WR
2025	5	172	Chris Paul Jr.	Los Angeles Rams	LB
2025	6	180	JJ Pegues	Las Vegas Raiders	DT
2026	2	33	De'Zhaun Stribling	San Francisco 49ers	WR
2026	7	217	Jayden Williams	Arizona Cardinals	T

== Notable undrafted players ==
Note: No drafts held before 1920

Debut year	Player name	Position	Debut NFL/AFL team	Notes
1960	Charlie Kempinska	G	Los Angeles Chargers	—
1977	Wade Griffin	T	Baltimore Colts	—
1980	Leon Perry	RB	New York Giants	—
1984	Skip Lane	DB	Kansas City Chiefs	—
1986	Nathan Wonsley	RB	Tampa Bay Buccaneers	—
1987	Dwight Bingham	DE	Atlanta Falcons	—
1996	Michael Lowery	LB	Chicago Bears	—
2022	Dontario Drummond	WR	Dallas Cowboys	—
2022	Jerrion Ealy	RB/WR	Kansas City Chiefs	—
2022	Jaylon Jones	CB	Jacksonville Jaguars	—
2022	Braylon Sanders	WR	Miami Dolphins	—
2023	Malik Heath	WR	Green Bay Packers	—
2024	DeShawn Gaddie	CB	Carolina Panthers	—
2024	Jeremiah Jean-Baptiste	LB	Los Angeles Chargers	—
2024	Isaac Ukwu	DE	Detroit Lions	—
2024	Dayton Wade	WR	Baltimore Ravens	—
2024	Zamari Walton	CB	Los Angeles Chargers	—
2025	Ulysses Bentley IV	RB	Indianapolis Colts	—
2025	Caden Davis	PK	New York Jets	—
2025	Jared Ivey	LB	Seattle Seahawks	Super Bowl champion (LX)
2025	Caden Prieskorn	TE	Detroit Lions	—
2025	Trey Washington	S	Indianapolis Colts	—
2025	Antwane Wells Jr.	WR	New York Giants	—
2026	Tahj Chambers	LB	Indianapolis Colts	—
2026	Kapena Gushiken	S	Philadelphia Eagles	—
2026	Zxavian Harris	DT	New Orleans Saints	—
2026	Diego Pounds	OT	Baltimore Ravens	—
2026	Harrison Wallace III	WR	Arizona Cardinals	—
2026	Wydett Williams Jr.	S	Arizona Cardinals	—
2026	Dae'Quan Wright	TE	Philadelphia Eagles	—
