= Ricky Manning =

American football player and coach (born 1980)

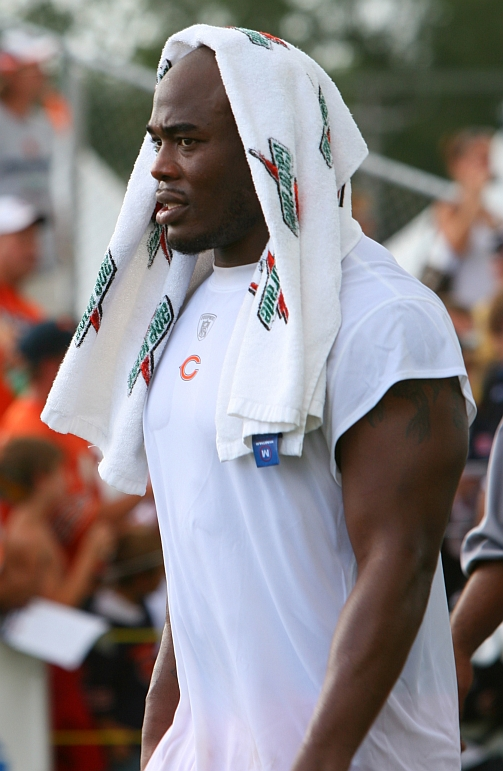
- Manning with the Bears in 2007

Atlanta Falcons
- Title: Assistant defensive backs coach

Personal information
- Born: November 18, 1980 (age 45); Fresno, California, U.S.
- Listed height: 5 ft 9 in (1.75 m)
- Listed weight: 193 lb (88 kg)

Career information
- Position: Cornerback (No. 24, 27)
- High school: Edison (Fresno, California)
- College: UCLA
- NFL draft: 2003: 3rd round, 82nd overall pick

Career history

Playing
- Carolina Panthers (2003–2005); Chicago Bears (2006–2007); St. Louis Rams (2008); Oakland Raiders (2009)*; Florida Tuskers/Virginia Destroyers (2009–2011)
- * Offseason or practice squad member only

Coaching
- Edison HS (CA) (2012) Head coach; Fresno City (2013–2014) Defensive backs coach & special teams coach; Fresno State (2015) Graduate assistant; Seattle Seahawks (2016–2017) Assistant defensive backs coach; New York Jets (2021–2023) Defensive assistant; Las Vegas Raiders (2024) Cornerbacks coach; Atlanta Falcons (2026–present) Assistant defensive backs coach

Awards and highlights
- 3× First-team All-Pac-10 (2000, 2001, 2002)

Career NFL statistics
- Total tackles: 268
- Sacks: 4
- Forced fumbles: 4
- Fumble recoveries: 5
- Interceptions: 14
- Defensive touchdowns: 3
- Stats at Pro Football Reference

Richard Manning Jr. (born November 18, 1980) is an American football coach and former cornerback who is currently the assistant defensive backs coach for the Atlanta Falcons of the National Football League (NFL). He previously served as an assistant coach for the New York Jets, Seattle Seahawks and Las Vegas Raiders, and at California State University, Fresno.

Manning played college football for the UCLA Bruins and was selected by the Carolina Panthers in the third round of the 2003 NFL draft. Along with the Panthers he also played for the Chicago Bears, St. Louis Rams, Oakland Raiders, and the Florida Tuskers of the United Football League (UFL).

== Early life ==
Manning played high school football at Edison High School in Fresno.

== Playing career ==
=== College ===
Manning started 45 consecutive games for UCLA, which ranks as the second longest streak in school history. His 13 interceptions tie him for seventh all-time among Bruin players. In addition, he made first-team All-Pac-10 for his last three years.

=== Professional ===
Pre-draft measurables
Height	Weight	Arm length	Hand span	40-yard dash	10-yard split	20-yard split	20-yard shuttle	Three-cone drill	Vertical jump	Broad jump	Bench press
5 ft 8 5/8 in (1.74 m)	185 lb (84 kg)	29 in (0.74 m)	9 3/4 in (0.25 m)	4.59 s	1.64 s	2.66 s	4.17 s	7.11 s	36.5 in (0.93 m)	9 ft 9 in (2.97 m)	12 reps
All values from NFL Combine

==== Carolina Panthers ====
Manning was taken in the third round (82nd overall) of the 2003 NFL draft by Carolina. His first pick came in only his second game, as he intercepted Atlanta Falcons quarterback Doug Johnson. With injuries to the secondary, Manning eventually took over a starting role. His first interception to be returned for a touchdown came against the New York Giants. But he will be forever remembered by Panthers fans for his performance during the 2003-04 NFL playoffs. In the NFC Divisional game against the St. Louis Rams, Manning's timely interception of Marc Bulger set up the game-winning touchdown to propel the Panthers into the NFC Championship game against the Philadelphia Eagles. There, Manning made a permanent mark on Panther history by intercepting Donovan McNabb three times en route to the Panthers' victory. Manning became the first rookie to win Defensive Player of the Week honors twice in the same postseason. As of 2017's NFL off-season, Manning's 4 postseason interceptions in 2003 remain franchise records for both a career and single season, as do his 3 interceptions in the Philadelphia game.

During the Panthers' injury-riddled 2004 season, Manning helped anchor a defense that ranked first in the league in interceptions. Against the Rams, Manning and teammate Dan Morgan picked off two passes each, the first game where a pair of teammates had a pair of interceptions in three years.

==== Chicago Bears ====
Ricky became a restricted free agent in the following offseason, and the Bears signed him to an offer sheet on April 21. The Panthers declined to match Chicago's offer, and received a third round pick (88th overall, later used to select James Anderson) from the Bears in the 2006 NFL draft. Manning intercepted five passes during the 2006 season. He intercepted two passes from Matt Hasselbeck, and later returned an interception for a touchdown against the Minnesota Vikings during week thirteen. He also had an interception during the Divisional Playoffs against the Seattle Seahawks.

Manning saw minimal playtime during the 2007 season, and was used at nickelback. He later worked with the team's third string defense, and tutored Danieal Manning, who would eventually replace him as the team's nickelback. On August 26, 2008, the Chicago Bears released Manning after a two-year stint.

==== St. Louis Rams ====
On August 31, 2008, Manning agreed to terms with the St. Louis Rams. He officially signed the following day. Then on October 14, 2008, Manning was placed on injured reserve after injuring his foot in a game against the Washington Redskins.

==== Oakland Raiders ====
Manning signed with the Oakland Raiders on August 15, 2009, after the team released tight end John Paul Foschi. Manning was released on August 24.

==== Legal troubles ====
In 2002 Manning was convicted of assault as a result of a fight with cheerleaders Brian Herbert and Seth Spiker outside a Westwood bar. Originally charged with two counts of felony assault, Manning pleaded not guilty to one count and the other count was dismissed. He received probation.

On April 23, 2006, Manning attacked Soroush Sabzi, in a Denny's restaurant after first teasing him for working on a laptop computer. He was charged with assault with a deadly weapon. Two days before the incident, the Bears had signed Manning to a $21 million offer sheet. In light of the assault charge, the Panthers declined to match Chicago's offer and Manning signed with the Bears.

Facing up to 4 years in prison, Manning pleaded no contest in September 2006 to felony assault in exchange for another probation deal. Later, Manning proclaimed his innocence. He acknowledged having words with the victim then pushing him in the head—but after that, according to him, his former UCLA teammates did the damage. "Yeah, I did it" explained Manning (AP report). "If I don't plea to this I have to go through trial. We're in season now. Then I'd have to put it in the hands of a jury. There are tons of things that can happen with a jury... I just can't risk that."

The NFL suspended him for one game for this, his second felony assault conviction.

== Coaching career ==
=== Early career ===
In 2012 Manning was hired to coach his high school alma mater's varsity football team. He was the head coach of the Edison High Tigers, in Fresno, California, for just one year. From there Manning went on to coach 2 seasons at Fresno City College as defensive backs and special teams coach before going back to school at Fresno State and working as a graduate assistant.

=== Seattle Seahawks ===
In 2016, Manning was hired as an assistant coach with the Seattle Seahawks. It was announced in February 2018, that Manning would not return to the Seahawks for the 2018 season.

=== New York Jets ===
Manning was named a defensive assistant on the New York Jets staff in 2021.

=== Las Vegas Raiders ===
On February 23, 2024, Manning was hired by the Las Vegas Raiders as their cornerbacks coach under head coach Antonio Pierce. On February 4, 2025, Manning was dismissed by the Raiders.

=== Atlanta Falcons ===
On February 10, 2026, the Atlanta Falcons hired Manning to serve as the team's assistant defensive backs/nickels coach under newly-hired head coach Kevin Stefanski.

== NFL career statistics ==
=== Regular season ===
Year	Team	GP	Tackles				Interceptions						Fumbles	
Year	Team	GP	Comb	Solo	Ast	Sack	PD	Int	Yds	Avg	Lng	TD	FF	FR
2003	CAR	16	57	50	7	0.0	7	3	33	11.0	27	1	2	1
2004	CAR	16	66	54	12	0.0	9	2	46	11.5	30	0	0	0
2005	CAR	16	41	33	8	0.0	6	4	20	10.0	10	0	1	3
2006	CHI	15	53	42	11	2.0	10	5	113	22.6	54	1	1	0
2007	CHI	16	44	33	11	1.0	1	0	0	0.0	0	0	0	1
2008	STL	5	7	6	1	1.0	0	0	0	0.0	0	0	0	0
Career		84	268	218	50	4.0	33	14	212	15.1	54	2	4	5

=== Postseason ===
Year	Team	GP	Tackles				Interceptions						Fumbles	
Year	Team	GP	Comb	Solo	Ast	Sack	PD	Int	Yds	Avg	Lng	TD	FF	FR
2003	CAR	4	19	17	2	0.0	8	4	15	3.8	13	0	0	0
2005	CAR	3	9	9	0	0.0	0	0	0	0.0	0	0	0	0
2006	CHI	3	11	9	2	0.0	1	1	6	6.0	6	0	0	0
Career		10	39	35	4	0.0	9	5	21	4.2	13	0	0	0
