= Lemar Marshall =

American football player (born 1976)

No. 52, 98
- Position: Linebacker

Personal information
- Born: December 17, 1976 (age 49); Cincinnati, Ohio, U.S.
- Listed height: 6 ft 2 in (1.88 m)
- Listed weight: 225 lb (102 kg)

Career information
- High school: St. Xavier (Cincinnati)
- College: Michigan State
- NFL draft: 1999: undrafted

Career history
- Tampa Bay Buccaneers (1999)*; Philadelphia Eagles (1999-2000)*; Tampa Bay Buccaneers (2000)*; Denver Broncos (2001)*; Washington Redskins (2001–2006); Cincinnati Bengals (2007)
- * Offseason or practice squad member only

Career NFL statistics
- Total tackles: 302
- Sacks: 6.5
- Forced fumbles: 3
- Fumble recoveries: 1
- Interceptions: 4
- Defensive touchdowns: 1
- Stats at Pro Football Reference

Lemar Willie Marshall (born December 17, 1976) is an American former professional football player who was a linebacker in the National Football League (NFL). He played college football for the Michigan State Spartans and was signed by the Tampa Bay Buccaneers as an undrafted free agent in 1999.

== Early life ==
Marshall was a first-team All-State pick as a senior at St. Xavier High School in Cincinnati, where he graduated in 1995. Lemar was a three-year starter at cornerback for the Bomber football team, including his sophomore year when he played on the state finalist squad. He was first-team all-GCL and all-city as a junior and senior and was a first-team All-Ohio pick as a senior. Lemar also earned three letters in basketball and was a second-team all-GCL pick as a senior. He was inducted into the school's Hall of Fame in 2008.

== College career ==
Marshall was recruited by Michigan State University in 1995. He played in 11 games as a true freshman, including two at cornerback. As a sophomore in 1996, he posted 54 stops in 12 games. He started four of 12 games at strong safety as a junior, recording 79 tackles in 1997. As a senior in 1998, he finished third on the team with a career-high 101 tackles, and also recorded two interceptions, breaking up 16 other passes. At Michigan State, Marshall lettered all four years, compiling 261 tackles and 27 passes defensed. He was a merchandising management major.

== Professional career ==
Marshall entered the National Football League as an undrafted free agent with the Tampa Bay Buccaneers in 1999. He spent parts of 1999 and 2000 on the practice squads of the Buccaneers and the Philadelphia Eagles.

In 2001, he spent training camp with the Denver Broncos before being released in early September. Marshall signed with the Washington Redskins in late 2001.

In 2002, he made his professional debut in Week 1 against the Arizona Cardinals. He went on to play all 16 games as a reserve linebacker and on special teams coverage units. He posted nine total tackles, mostly on special teams.

In 2003, Marshall played in 12 games, primarily on special teams units but also logged some action at reserve linebacker, getting ten total tackles and 0.5 sacks. He was inactive for four games.

In 2004, Marshall had a breakthrough season, starting 14 games at outside linebacker when LaVar Arrington was sidelined with a knee injury. Marshall stepped up, recording 69 tackles and 1.5 sacks.

During the 2005 season, Marshall started all 16 games, recording 98 tackles and 2 sacks, as well as four interceptions, two forced fumbles, and one defensive touchdown. Marshall anchored the middle of the defense as the Redskins made the playoffs for the first time since 1999.

In 2006, he didn't perform as well because he was bothered by knee and ankle injuries. However, he managed to get a career-high of 104 tackles. This was the only time in his professional career that he had over 100 tackles, along with his 1.5 sacks and 1 safety.

Marshall signed a one-year contract with his hometown-Bengals August 23, 2007, two days after a surprise move by the Washington Redskins who released him in training camp. He appeared in four games for the Bengals, starting three, and recorded eight tackles, 1 sack, 1 forced fumble, and 1 safety. However, he was placed on the injured reserve with a ruptured Achilles tendon after his fourth game. He was not retained by Cincinnati.

== Personal life ==
He is the co-owner of a fitness studio called Phenom Strength & Conditioning in Ashburn, Virginia.
