= Dante Wesley =

American football player (born 1979)

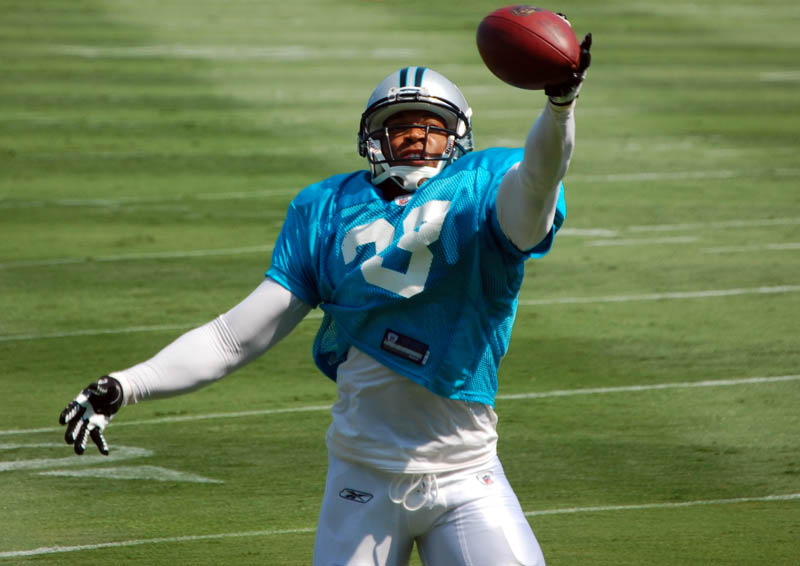
- Wesley at the Carolina Panthers 2008 Fan Fest

No. 29, 21, 23, 33
- Position: Cornerback

Personal information
- Born: April 5, 1979 (age 47); St. Louis, Missouri, U.S.
- Listed height: 6 ft 1 in (1.85 m)
- Listed weight: 215 lb (98 kg)

Career information
- High school: Watson Chapel (Pine Bluff, Arkansas)
- College: Arkansas–Pine Bluff
- NFL draft: 2002: 4th round, 100th overall pick

Career history
- Carolina Panthers (2002–2005); Chicago Bears (2006); New England Patriots (2007)*; Carolina Panthers (2007–2009); Detroit Lions (2010)
- * Offseason or practice squad member only

Awards and highlights
- All-American (2001); First-team All-SWAC (2001); 2× second-team All-SWAC (1999-2000)

Career NFL statistics
- Total tackles: 104
- Forced fumbles: 5
- Fumble recoveries: 5
- Pass deflections: 18
- Defensive touchdowns: 1
- Stats at Pro Football Reference

Dante Julius Wesley (born April 5, 1979) is an American former professional football player who was a cornerback in the National Football League (NFL). He was selected by the Carolina Panthers in the fourth round of the 2002 NFL draft. He played college football for the Arkansas–Pine Bluff Golden Lions. Wesley was also a member of the Chicago Bears, New England Patriots and Detroit Lions.

== Professional career ==
=== Carolina Panthers (first stint) ===
Wesley was selected by the Carolina Panthers in the fourth round (100th overall) of the 2002 NFL draft.

=== Chicago Bears ===
In March 2006 he signed a 2-year contract with the Chicago Bears.

=== New England Patriots ===
After one season with the Bears, Wesley was acquired by the New England Patriots for an undisclosed draft pick in the 2008 NFL draft.

=== Carolina Panthers (second stint) ===
On September 3, 2007, after being released by the Patriots, he signed again with the Panthers.

Wesley scored his first career touchdown on a 12-yard fumble return against the New Orleans Saints in the 2008 season finale.

In the 2009 NFL season, during a game against the Tampa Bay Buccaneers, Wesley hit the punt returner Clifton Smith, who had called for a fair catch but not yet received the ball. The Panthers were assessed a 15-yard penalty and he was ejected from the game. Two days later, the NFL suspended Wesley for one game without pay. Wesley said he never meant to harm Smith, saying he merely mistimed his hit on him and wanted to apologize to Smith.

=== Detroit Lions ===
Wesley signed with the Detroit Lions as an unrestricted free agent on April 3, 2010. Wesley was cut after the Lions had to go to the 53-man roster. He was re-signed by the Lions on September 30, 2010. He was released on October 19.

=== NFL statistics ===
| Year | Team | GP | COMB | TOTAL | AST | SACK | FF | FR | FR YDS | INT | IR YDS | AVG IR | LNG | TD | PD |
|---|---|---|---|---|---|---|---|---|---|---|---|---|---|---|---|
| 2002 | CAR | 13 | 17 | 14 | 3 | 0.0 | 1 | 0 | 0 | 0 | 0 | 0 | 0 | 0 | 8 |
| 2003 | CAR | 16 | 16 | 14 | 2 | 1.0 | 1 | 1 | 0 | 0 | 0 | 0 | 0 | 0 | 3 |
| 2004 | CAR | 13 | 20 | 18 | 2 | 0.0 | 0 | 0 | 0 | 0 | 0 | 0 | 0 | 0 | 0 |
| 2005 | CAR | 16 | 17 | 16 | 1 | 0.0 | 1 | 1 | 0 | 0 | 0 | 0 | 0 | 0 | 1 |
| 2006 | CHI | 13 | 10 | 9 | 1 | 0.0 | 0 | 0 | 0 | 0 | 0 | 0 | 0 | 0 | 0 |
| 2007 | CAR | 2 | 2 | 2 | 0 | 0.0 | 0 | 0 | 0 | 0 | 0 | 0 | 0 | 0 | 0 |
| 2008 | CAR | 16 | 9 | 8 | 1 | 0.0 | 2 | 1 | 0 | 0 | 0 | 0 | 0 | 0 | 3 |
| 2009 | CAR | 15 | 11 | 11 | 0 | 1.0 | 0 | 2 | 0 | 0 | 0 | 0 | 0 | 0 | 3 |
| 2010 | DET | 3 | 2 | 2 | 0 | 0.0 | 0 | 0 | 0 | 0 | 0 | 0 | 0 | 0 | 0 |
| Career | | 107 | 104 | 94 | 10 | 2.0 | 5 | 5 | 0 | 0 | 0 | 0 | 0 | 0 | 18 |
