= 2005 Cincinnati Bengals season =

NFL team season

- Owner: Mike Brown
- Head coach: Marvin Lewis
- Home stadium: Paul Brown Stadium

Results
- Record: 11–5
- Division place: 1st AFC North
- Playoffs: Lost Wild Card Playoffs (vs. Steelers) 17–31
- All-Pros: WR Chad Johnson (1st team)
- Pro Bowlers: OT Willie Anderson; WR Chad Johnson; QB Carson Palmer; CB Deltha O'Neal; K Shayne Graham

Uniform
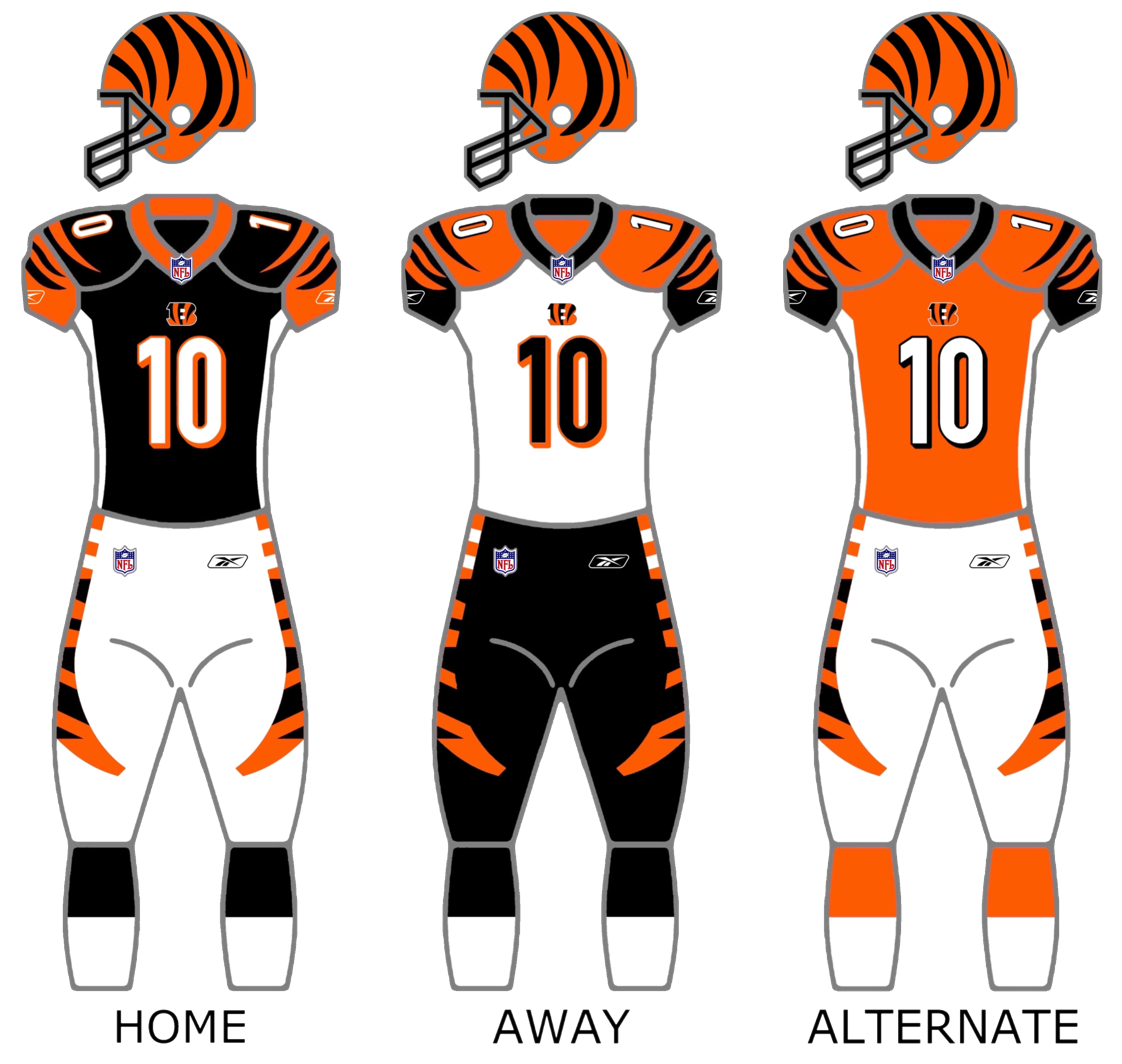

The 2005 Cincinnati Bengals season was the franchise's 36th season in the National Football League (NFL), the 38th overall, and the third under head coach Marvin Lewis. It was the team's first season with a winning record, playoff berth, and division title since 1990. In the fourteen seasons and 224 games in between (1991–2004), the Bengals' record was 71–153, a 0.317 winning percentage. It would be the Bengals' lone playoff appearance in a span of 18 years (1991–2008). Quarterback Carson Palmer got off to a strong start on his way to a solid 3836-yard season with 32 touchdown passes, earning a trip to the Pro Bowl. Receiving many of Palmer's passes was Chad Johnson, who followed teammate Palmer to the Pro Bowl in Hawaii, racking up an impressive 1,432 yards in receiving with nine touchdowns, many of which were followed by unique celebrations that made him a regular star on the sports highlight shows.

Following a 42–29 win over the Baltimore Ravens, the Bengals faced the Pittsburgh Steelers, this time in Pittsburgh, where the Bengals offense continued to fly behind Carson Palmer, who had three touchdown passes and 227 yards passing in an impressive 38–31 win that gave the Bengals first place in the AFC North at 9–3. The Bengals would not relinquish first place, winning the next two games to clinch the division with two weeks to go. On December 18, with a 41–17 win over the Detroit Lions, the Bengals clinched a playoff spot. After clinching the division the Bengals played cautiously and dropped their final two games to finish with an 11–5 record, beating out the eventual Super Bowl champion Pittsburgh Steelers, who finished with an identical record, on a tiebreaker situation.

However, a costly loss to the Steelers in the wild card round extended their playoff win drought to 16 years.

== Offseason ==
Additions	Subtractions
OLB Hannibal Navies (Packers)	WR Peter Warrick (Seahawks)
DT Bryan Robinson (Dolphins)	MLB Frank Chamberlin (Texans)
S Ifeanyi Ohalete (Cardinals)	
FB Nick Luchey (Packers)	

=== NFL draft ===
2005 Cincinnati Bengals draft
Round	Pick	Player	Position	College	Notes
1	17	David Pollack	Linebacker	Georgia	
2	48	Odell Thurman	Linebacker	Georgia	
3	83	Chris Henry	Wide receiver	West Virginia	
4	119	Eric Ghiaciuc	Center	Central Michigan	
5	153	Adam Kieft	Offensive tackle	Central Michigan	
6	190	Tab Perry	Wide receiver	UCLA	
7	233	Jonathan Fanene	Defensive end	Utah	
Made roster

=== Undrafted free agents ===
2005 undrafted free agents of note
Player	Position	College
Lyonel Anderson	Tight end	Kansas
Patrick Body	Cornerback	Toledo
Herana-Daze Jones	Safety	Indiana
Cedric Sullivan	Linebacker	Troy
Kyle Takavitz	Guard	Cincinnati
Jeremy Thomas	Fullback	Georgia
Steven Vieira	Guard	UCLA
Ben Wilkerson	Center	LSU

== Personnel ==
2005 Cincinnati Bengals staff
Front office: President – Mike Brown; Head coaches: Head coach – Marvin Lewis; Assistant head coach/offensive line – Paul Alexander; Offensive coaches: Offensive coordinator – Bob Bratkowski; Quarterbacks – Ken Zampese; Running backs – Jim Anderson; Wide receivers – Hue Jackson; Tight ends – Jonathan Hayes; Assistant offensive line – Bob Surace	Defensive coaches: Defensive coordinator – Chuck Bresnahan; Defensive line – Jay Hayes; Linebackers – Ricky Hunley; Defensive backs – Kevin Coyle; Assistant defensive backs – Louie Cioffi; Special teams coaches: Special teams – Darrin Simmons; Staff assistant – Paul Guenther; Strength and conditioning: Strength and conditioning – Chip Morton; Assistant strength and conditioning – Ray Oliver

== Roster ==
2005 Cincinnati Bengals roster
Quarterbacks (QB): 3 Jon Kitna; 6 Craig Krenzel; 9 Carson Palmer; Running backs (RB): 31 Jeremi Johnson FB; 32 Rudi Johnson; 30 Nick Luchey FB; 23 Chris Perry; Wide receivers (WR): 15 Chris Henry; 84 T. J. Houshmandzadeh; 85 Chad Johnson; 88 Tab Perry; 83 Kevin Walter; 87 Kelley Washington; Tight ends (TE): 82 Reggie Kelly; 89 Matt Schobel; 86 Tony Stewart	Offensive linemen (OL): 71 Willie Anderson RT; 79 Stacy Andrews RT; 74 Rich Braham C; 53 Eric Ghiaciuc C; 76 Levi Jones LT; 75 Scott Kooistra; 65 Eric Steinbach G; 63 Bobbie Williams G; Defensive linemen (DL): 96 Matthias Askew DT; 92 Duane Clemons DE; 68 Jonathan Fanene DE; 91 Robert Geathers DE; 72 Carl Powell DE; 98 Bryan Robinson DT; 90 Justin Smith DE; 66 Shaun Smith DT; 97 John Thornton DT	Linebackers (LB): 59 Landon Johnson OLB; 58 Caleb Miller MLB; 57 Hannibal Navies OLB; 99 David Pollack OLB; 56 Brian Simmons OLB; 51 Odell Thurman MLB; 52 Nate Webster MLB; 55 Marcus Wilkins OLB; Defensive backs (DB): 21 Rashad Bauman CB; 41 Patrick Body CB; 27 Greg Brooks CB; 20 Tory James CB; 34 Kevin Kaesviharn FS; 42 Anthony Mitchell FS; 26 Ifeanyi Ohalete SS; 24 Deltha O'Neal CB; 25 Keiwan Ratliff CB; Special teams (ST): 17 Shayne Graham K; 19 Kyle Larson P; 48 Brad St. Louis LS	Practice squad: 13 Jamall Broussard WR; 36 Tony Bua S; 49 Ronnie Ghent FB; 44 Herana-Daze Jones S; 61 Pete Lougheed OT; 73 Kyle Takavitz G; 67 Ryan Hayslip OT; 35 Quincy Wilson RB; Reserve: 22 Kim Herring S (IR); 70 Adam Kieft RT (IR); 50 Larry Moore C/G (IR); 33 Kenny Watson RB (IR); 64 Ben Wilkerson C (NF-Inj.); 40 Madieu Williams S (IR); Rookies in italics 53 active, 6 reserve, 8 practice squad

== Regular season ==
In addition to their regular games with AFC North rivals, the Bengals played teams from the AFC South and NFC North as per the schedule rotation, and also played intraconference games against the Bills and the Chiefs based on divisional positions from 2004.

=== Schedule ===
Week	Date	Opponent	Result	Record	Venue	Recap
1	September 11	at **Cleveland Browns**	**W** 27–13	1–0	Cleveland Browns Stadium	Recap
2	September 18	Minnesota Vikings	**W** 37–8	2–0	Paul Brown Stadium	Recap
3	September 25	at Chicago Bears	**W** 24–7	3–0	Soldier Field	Recap
4	October 2	Houston Texans	**W** 16–10	4–0	Paul Brown Stadium	Recap
5	October 9	at Jacksonville Jaguars	**L** 20–23	4–1	Alltel Stadium	Recap
6	October 16	at Tennessee Titans	**W** 31–23	5–1	The Coliseum	Recap
7	October 23	**Pittsburgh Steelers**	**L** 13–27	5–2	Paul Brown Stadium	Recap
8	October 30	Green Bay Packers	**W** 21–14	6–2	Paul Brown Stadium	Recap
9	November 6	at **Baltimore Ravens**	**W** 21–9	7–2	M&T Bank Stadium	Recap
10	Bye					
11	November 20	Indianapolis Colts	**L** 37–45	7–3	Paul Brown Stadium	Recap
12	November 27	**Baltimore Ravens**	**W** 42–29	8–3	Paul Brown Stadium	Recap
13	December 4	at **Pittsburgh Steelers**	**W** 38–31	9–3	Heinz Field	Recap
14	December 11	**Cleveland Browns**	**W** 23–20	10–3	Paul Brown Stadium	Recap
15	December 18	at Detroit Lions	**W** 41–17	11–3	Ford Field	Recap
16	December 24	Buffalo Bills	**L** 27–37	11–4	Paul Brown Stadium	Recap
17	January 1	at Kansas City Chiefs	**L** 3–37	11–5	Arrowhead Stadium	Recap

Note: Intra-divisional opponents are in bold text

=== Week 1 ===
Team	1	2	3	4	Total
• Bengals	0	17	10	0	27
Browns	3	7	0	3	13

- Date: September 11
- Location: Cleveland Browns Stadium
- Game attendance: 73,013
- Game weather: 80° Sunny
- Referee: Scott Green
- TV announcers (CBS): Ian Eagle and Solomon Wilcots

Scoring summary
Q1	4:37	CLE	Dawson 29 yard field goal	CLE 3–0
Q2	13:44	CIN	R. Johnson 1 yard run (Graham kick)	CIN 7–3
Q2	8:46	CIN	Graham 32 yard field goal	CIN 10–3
Q2	5:03	CLE	Jackson 68 yard pass from Dilfer (Dawson kick)	Tie 10–10
Q2	0:45	CIN	Walter 20 yard pass from Palmer (Graham kick)	CIN 17–10
Q3	9:48	CIN	J. Johnson 18 yard pass from Palmer (Graham kick)	CIN 24–10
Q3	8:24	CIN	Graham 23 yard field goal	CIN 27–10
Q4	9:48	CLE	Dawson 34 yard field goal	CIN 27–13

- Rudi Johnson 26 Rush, 126 Yds

=== Week 8 vs Packers ===
Week Eight: Green Bay Packers (1–5) at Cincinnati Bengals (5–1)

Quarter	1	2	3	4	Total
Packers	0	7	0	7	**14**
Bengals	7	7	0	7	**21**

at Paul Brown Stadium • Cincinnati, Ohio

- Date: October 30
- Game time: 1:00 p.m. EDT
- Game weather: Sunny • 58 °F (14 °C) • Wind SW 9 miles per hour (14 km/h; 7.8 kn)
- Game attendance: 65,940
- Referee: Bill Vinovich
- TV announcers (FOX): Sam Rosen, Bill Maas, and Jay Glazer
- Gamebook

Game information

Packers

- Brett Favre
  26/39, 279 Yds, TD, 5 INT
- Tony Fisher
  17 Rush, 51 Yds, TD
- Antonio Chatman
  8 Rec, 97 Yds

Bengals

- Carson Palmer
  22/34, 237 Yds, 3 TD, INT
- Rudi Johnson
  22 Rush, 72 Yds
- T.J. Houshmanzadeh
  5 Rec, 77 Yds, TD

Scoring summary

Quarter	Time	Drive			Team	Scoring information	Score	
Quarter	Time	Plays	Yards	TOP	Team	Scoring information	GB	CIN
1	8:45	11	60	6:15	Bengals	Chris Perry 4-yard touchdown reception from Carson Palmer, Shayne Graham kick good	0	7
2	9:35	11	66	5:54	Packers	Tony Fisher 1-yard touchdown run, Ryan Longwell kick good	7	7
2	3:07	12	73	6:28	Bengals	T.J. Houshmandzadeh 8-yard touchdown reception from Carson Palmer, Shayne Graham kick good	7	14
4	13:17	1	27	0:07	Bengals	Jeremi Johnson 27-yard touchdown reception from Carson Palmer, Shayne Graham kick good	7	21
4	3:11	13	88	5:17	Packers	Bubba Franks 1-yard touchdown reception from Brett Favre, Ryan Longwell kick good	14	21
"TOP" = time of possession. For other American football terms, see Glossary of American football.							14	21

=== Standings ===
AFC North
	W	L	T	PCT	DIV	CONF	PF	PA	STK
^{(3)} Cincinnati Bengals	11	5	0	.688	5–1	7–5	421	350	L2
^{(6)} Pittsburgh Steelers	11	5	0	.688	4–2	7–5	389	258	W4
Baltimore Ravens	6	10	0	.375	2–4	4–8	265	299	L1
Cleveland Browns	6	10	0	.375	1–5	4–8	232	301	W1

== Postseason ==
=== Wild Card vs Steelers ===
AFC wild card game: (#6) Pittsburgh Steelers (11–5) at (#3) Cincinnati Bengals (11–5)

Quarter	1	2	3	4	Total
Steelers	0	14	14	3	31
Bengals	10	7	0	0	17

at Paul Brown Stadium • Cincinnati, Ohio

- Date: January 8, 2006
- Game time: 4:30 p.m. EDT
- Game weather: Partly cloudy • 61 °F (16 °C) • Wind SW 22 miles per hour (35 km/h; 19 kn)
- Game attendance: 65,870
- Referee: Larry Nemmers
- TV announcers (CBS): Jim Nantz, Phil Simms, and Bonnie Bernstein
- Game Book

Game information

Steelers

- Ben Roethlisberger
  14/19, 208 Yds, 3 TD
- Jerome Bettis
  10 Rush, 52 Yds, TD
- Cedrick Wilson
  3 Rec, 104 Yds, TD

Bengals

- Jon Kitna
  24/40, 197 Yds, TD, 2 INT
- Rudi Johnson
  13 Rush, 56 Yds, TD
- Kevin Walter
  5 Rec, 73 Yds

On January 8, 2006, the Cincinnati Bengals took on the Pittsburgh Steelers in the opening round of the playoffs, making it the Bengals’ first playoff appearance of the decade. Early in the game, disaster struck for the Bengals when Steelers lineman Kimo von Oelhoffen hit Bengals quarterback Carson Palmer's knee, resulting in a tear of Palmer's anterior cruciate ligament (ACL). Backup quarterback Jon Kitna took over and did very well, giving Cincinnati leads of 10–0 and 17–7 at points of the game. All seemed well for the Bengals until the Steelers came back with 24 unanswered points and upset the Cincinnati Bengals with a final score of 31–17. The Steelers went on to win the Super Bowl.

With the costly loss, the Bengals season ended at 11–6, thus once again it extended their playoff win drought to 16 years.

Scoring summary

Quarter	Time	Drive			Team	Scoring information	Score	
Quarter	Time	Plays	Yards	TOP	Team	Scoring information	PIT	CIN
1	6:54	9	84	4:25	Bengals	23-yard field goal by Shayne Graham	0	3
1	1:09	7	76	3:26	Bengals	Rudi Johnson 20-yard touchdown run, Shayne Graham kick good	0	10
2	13:11	8	60	2:58	Steelers	Willie Parker 19-yard touchdown reception from Ben Roethlisberger, Jeff Reed kick good	7	10
2	6:13	14	57	6:58	Bengals	T.J. Houshmandzadeh 7-yard touchdown reception from Jon Kitna, Shayne Graham kick good	7	17
2	3:48	6	76	2:25	Steelers	Hines Ward 5-yard touchdown reception from Ben Roethlisberger, Jeff Reed kick good	14	17
3	5:12	8	66	4:39	Steelers	Jerome Bettis 5-yard touchdown run, Jeff Reed kick good	21	17
3	1:13	3	50	1:35	Steelers	Cedrick Wilson 43-yard touchdown reception from Ben Roethlisberger, Jeff Reed kick good	28	17
4	10:29	6	37	2:56	Steelers	21-yard field goal by Jeff Reed	31	17
"TOP" = time of possession. For other American football terms, see Glossary of American football.							31	17

== Team leaders ==
=== Passing ===
Player	Att	Comp	Yds	TD	INT	Rating
Carson Palmer	509	345	3836	32	12	101.1

=== Rushing ===
Player	Att	Yds	YPC	Long	TD
Rudi Johnson	337	1458	4.3	33	12

=== Receiving ===
Player	Rec	Yds	Avg	Long	TD
Chad Johnson	97	1432	14.8	70	9

=== Defensive ===
Player	Tackles	Sacks	INTs	FF	FR
Odell Thurman	148	1.5	5	4	0
Justin Smith	92	6.0	0	1	1
Deltha O'Neal	63	0.0	10	0	1

=== Kicking and punting ===
Player	FGA	FGM	FG%	XPA	XPM	XP%	Points
Shayne Graham	32	28	87.5%	47	47	100.0%	131

Player	Punts	Yards	Long	Blkd	Avg.
Kyle Larson	60	2591	75	1	43.2

=== Special teams ===
Player	KR	KRYards	KRAvg	KRLong	KRTD	PR	PRYards	PRAvg	PRLong	PRTD
Tab Perry	64	1562	24.4	94	0	0	0	0.0	0	0
Keiwan Ratliff	0	0	0.0	0	0	28	157	5.6	13	0

== Awards and records ==
=== Pro Bowl selections ===
- Carson Palmer QB, AFC Pro Bowl selection
- Rudi Johnson RB, AFC Pro Bowl selection
- Chad Johnson WR, AFC Pro Bowl selection
- Willie Anderson RT, AFC Pro Bowl selection
- Deltha O'Neal CB, AFC Pro Bowl selection

=== All-Pro selections ===
- Chad Johnson WR, first-team All-Pro
- Willie Anderson RT, first-team All-Pro
- Deltha O'Neal CB, first-team All-Pro

=== Milestones ===
- Carson Palmer's first six starts of the season, combined with his last three starts of 2004, made him only the second passer in NFL history to post nine straight games with a passer rating of 100 or more (Peyton Manning, 2004)
- Carson Palmer led the NFL in three major passing categories – TD passes (32), completion percentage (67.8) and TD-INT differential (32–12)
- Rudi Johnson, 2nd 1000 yard rushing season (1,458 yards)
- Chad Johnson 4th 1000 yard receiving season
- Tab Perry, 1st 1000-yard return season (1,562 yards)

=== Records ===
- Cincinnati Bengals Chad Johnson and T. J. Houshmandzadeh set Bengals records for most receptions (175) and receiving yards (2,388) by a duo.
- The Bengals established a home season attendance record of 526,469 to break the mark of 524,248 set a season earlier.
