= 2005 Buffalo Bills season =

46th season in franchise history

- Owner: Ralph Wilson
- General manager: Tom Donahoe
- Head coach: Mike Mularkey
- Home stadium: Ralph Wilson Stadium

Results
- Record: 5–11
- Division place: 3rd AFC East
- Playoffs: Did not qualify
- Pro Bowlers: P Brian Moorman; LS Mike Schneck

The 2005 Buffalo Bills season was their 46th in the National Football League. The team was unable to improve upon their previous season's output of 9–7, instead finishing 5–11. This was the sixth consecutive season in which the team missed the playoffs.

Mike Mularkey coached the Bills for his second year. (Note: Second of two total years; Mularkey would resign from the Bills after the 2005 season)

== Offseason ==
Drew Bledsoe, who had been the team's quarterback from 2002 to 2004, was released by the Bills after the 2004 season to make way for backup quarterback J. P. Losman. It was the second time that Bledsoe's team had let him go for a younger quarterback. When Bledsoe was later signed by the Dallas Cowboys, he expressed bitterness with the Bills for the move, stating "I can't wait to go home and dress my kids in little stars and get rid of the other team’s [Buffalo’s] stuff."

The Bills failed to re-sign defensive tackle Pat Williams, who would sign with the Minnesota Vikings for the 2005 season. The Bills also lost starting offensive tackle Jonas Jennings to the San Francisco 49ers.

=== Draft ===
Buffalo had six draft picks in the 2005 draft. The Bills traded their only first round pick in 2005 to the Dallas Cowboys to move up in the previous draft, a pick they used to draft J. P. Losman.

2005 Buffalo Bills draft
Round	Pick	Player	Position	College	Notes
2	55	Roscoe Parrish	WR	Miami (FL)	
3	86	Kevin Everett	TE	Miami (FL)	
4	122	Duke Preston	C	Illinois	
5	156	Eric King	CB	Wake Forest	
6	197	Justin Geisinger	OG	Vanderbilt	
7	236	Lionel Gates	RB	Louisville	
Made roster † Pro Football Hall of Fame * Made at least one Pro Bowl during career

=== Undrafted free agents ===
2005 undrafted free agents of note
Player	Position	College
Brad Cieslak	Tight end	Northern Illinois
Liam Ezekiel	Linebacker	Northeastern
Therrian Fontenot	Cornerback	Fresno State
Jon Goldberry	Fullback	Purdue
Wendell Hunter	Linebacker	California
Rob Lee	Cornerback	Northern Illinois
Daniel Leger	Safety	Colorado School of Mines
Jim Leonhard	Safety	Wisconsin
Tom Sverchek	Defensive tackle	California
Marvin Ward	Cornerback	Northwestern

== Personnel ==
=== Staff ===
2005 Buffalo Bills staff
Front office: Owner/founder – Ralph Wilson; President/general manager – Tom Donahoe; Assistant general manager – Tom Modrak; Director of pro personnel – John Guy; Coordinator of college scouting – Doug Majeski; Head coaches: Head coach – Mike Mularkey; Offensive coaches: Offensive coordinator – Tom Clements; Quarterbacks – Sam Wyche; Running backs – Eric Studesville; Wide receivers – Tyke Tolbert; Tight ends – Mike Miller; Offensive line – Jim McNally; Offensive line – Frank Verducci	Defensive coaches: Defensive coordinator – Jerry Gray; Defensive line – Tim Krumrie; Linebackers – Don Blackmon; Defensive backs – Steve Szabo; Defensive assistant – Chuck Lester; Special teams coaches: Special teams – Bobby April; Strength and conditioning: Strength and conditioning coordinator – Brad Roll; Assistant strength and conditioning – John Allaire

=== Roster ===
2005 Buffalo Bills roster
Quarterbacks (QB): 10 Kelly Holcomb; 7 J. P. Losman; 6 Shane Matthews; Running backs (RB): 35 Joe Burns; 25 Lionel Gates; 44 Jon Goldsberry FB; 21 Willis McGahee; 31 Daimon Shelton FB; 20 Shaud Williams; Wide receivers (WR): 89 Sam Aiken; 83 Lee Evans; 80 Eric Moulds; 11 Roscoe Parrish; 82 Josh Reed; 19 Jonathan Smith; 15 George Wilson; Tight ends (TE): 84 Mark Campbell; 48 Brad Cieslak; 87 Tim Euhus	Offensive linemen (OL): 66 Bennie Anderson G; 69 Mike Gandy OT; 73 Justin Geisinger G; 76 Greg Jerman G; 79 Dylan McFarland OT; 71 Jason Peters OT; 75 Duke Preston C; 70 Trey Teague C; 58 Chris Villarrial G; 68 Mike Williams G/OT; Defensive linemen (DL): 95 Sam Adams DT; 77 Tim Anderson DT; 97 Justin Bannan DT; 92 Ryan Denney DE; 99 Jason Jefferson DT; 90 Chris Kelsay DE; 94 Aaron Schobel DE	Linebackers (LB): 55 Angelo Crowell OLB; 50 Liam Ezekiel MLB; 59 London Fletcher MLB; 53 Mario Haggan OLB; 96 Jeff Posey OLB; 57 Josh Stamer OLB; Defensive backs (DB): 26 Rashad Baker FS; 22 Nate Clements CB; 33 Jabari Greer CB; 29 Eric King CB; 42 Jim Leonhard SS; 24 Terrence McGee CB; 36 Lawyer Milloy SS; 23 Troy Vincent FS; Special teams (ST): 9 Rian Lindell K; 8 Brian Moorman P; 54 Mike Schneck LS	Practice squad: 67 LaWaylon Brown DT; 60 Jasen Esposito OT; 40 Wendell Hunter LB; 39 Rob Lee CB; 72 Marques Ogden OT; 91 Eric Powell DE; Reserve: 98 Ron Edwards DE (IR); 85 Kevin Everett TE (IR); 88 Ryan Neufeld TE (IR); 72 Lawrence Smith G (IR); 93 Lauvale Sape DT (IR); 51 Takeo Spikes MLB (IR); 28 Kevin Thomas CB (PUP); 27 Coy Wire S (IR); Rookies in italics 53 active, 8 reserve, 6 practice squad

== Regular season ==
In addition to their regular games with AFC East rivals, the Bills played teams from the AFC West and NFC South as per the schedule rotation, and also played intraconference games against the Bengals and the Texans based on divisional positions from 2004.

=== Schedule ===
Week	Date	Opponent	Result	Record	Venue	Attendance	Recap
1	September 11	Houston Texans	**W** 22–7	1–0	Ralph Wilson Stadium	71,781	Recap
2	September 18	at Tampa Bay Buccaneers	**L** 3–19	1–1	Raymond James Stadium	64,777	Recap
3	September 25	Atlanta Falcons	**L** 16–24	1–2	Ralph Wilson Stadium	72,032	Recap
4	October 2	at New Orleans Saints	**L** 7–19	1–3	Alamodome	58,688	Recap
5	October 9	**Miami Dolphins**	**W** 20–14	2–3	Ralph Wilson Stadium	72,160	Recap
6	October 16	**New York Jets**	**W** 27–17	3–3	Ralph Wilson Stadium	72,045	Recap
7	October 23	at Oakland Raiders	**L** 17–38	3–4	McAfee Coliseum	42,779	Recap
8	October 30	at **New England Patriots**	**L** 16–21	3–5	Gillette Stadium	68,756	Recap
9	Bye						
10	November 13	Kansas City Chiefs	**W** 14–3	4–5	Ralph Wilson Stadium	72,093	Recap
11	November 20	at San Diego Chargers	**L** 10–48	4–6	Qualcomm Stadium	65,602	Recap
12	November 27	Carolina Panthers	**L** 9–13	4–7	Ralph Wilson Stadium	71,440	Recap
13	December 4	at **Miami Dolphins**	**L** 23–24	4–8	Dolphins Stadium	72,051	Recap
14	December 11	**New England Patriots**	**L** 7–35	4–9	Ralph Wilson Stadium	71,810	Recap
15	December 17	Denver Broncos	**L** 17–28	4–10	Ralph Wilson Stadium	71,887	Recap
16	December 24	at Cincinnati Bengals	**W** 37–27	5–10	Paul Brown Stadium	65,485	Recap
17	January 1	at **New York Jets**	**L** 26–30	5–11	Giants Stadium	76,822	Recap

Note: Intra-division opponents are in bold text.

== Standings ==
AFC East
	W	L	T	PCT	DIV	CONF	PF	PA	STK
^{(4)} New England Patriots	10	6	0	.625	5–1	7–5	379	338	L1
Miami Dolphins	9	7	0	.563	3–3	7–5	318	317	W6
Buffalo Bills	5	11	0	.313	2–4	5–7	271	367	L1
New York Jets	4	12	0	.250	2–4	3–9	240	355	W1

== Season summary ==
=== Week 1: vs. Houston Texans ===
Week One: Houston Texans (0–0) at Buffalo Bills (0–0)

Quarter	1	2	3	4	Total
Texans	0	7	0	0	7
Bills	6	13	0	3	22

at Ralph Wilson Stadium, Orchard Park, New York

- Date: September 11, 2005
- Game time: 1:00 pm EDT
- Game weather: Sunny, 75 °F or 23.9 °C
- Game attendance: 71,781
- Referee: Ron Winter
- TV announcers (CBS): Gus Johnson, Brent Jones
- Box Score

Game information

First quarter

- BUF – Rian Lindell 35-yard field goal, 9:24. Bills 3–0. Drive: 10 plays, 65 yards, 5:36.
- BUF – Rian Lindell 21-yard field goal, 1:43. Bills 6–0. Drive: 9 plays, 63 yards, 5:45.

Second quarter

- BUF – Rian Lindell 42-yard field goal, 13:57. Bills 9–0. Drive: 4 plays, 9 yards, 1:09.
- BUF – Rian Lindell 39-yard field goal, 11:07. Bills 12–0. Drive: 4 plays, 6 yards, 2:34.
- HOU – David Carr 1-yard run (Kris Brown kick). Bills 12–7. Drive: 12 plays, 75 yards, 4:30.
- BUF – Jason Peters 1-yard pass from J. P. Losman (Rian Lindell kick), 0:29. Bills 19–7. Drive: 11 plays, 61 yards, 6:08.

Third quarter

- No scoring

Fourth quarter

- BUF – Rian Lindell 31-yard field goal, 7:11. Bills 22–7. Drive: 6 plays, 10 yards, 2:31.

Top passers

- HOU – David Carr – 9/21, 70 yards, 3 INT
- BUF – J. P. Losman – 17/28, 170 yards, TD

Top rushers

- HOU – Domanick Williams – 17 rushes, 48 yards
- BUF – Willis McGahee – 22 rushes, 117 yards

Top receivers

- HOU – Mark Bruener – 1 reception, 19 yards
- BUF – Lee Evans – 3 receptions, 68 yards

- The Bills wore throwback AFL "standing buffalo" helmets
- J. P. Losman's 1st career start

=== Week 2: at Tampa Bay Buccaneers ===
Week Two: Buffalo Bills (1–0) at Tampa Bay Buccaneers (1–0)

Quarter	1	2	3	4	Total
Bills	0	3	0	0	3
Buccaneers	0	9	7	3	19

at Raymond James Stadium, Tampa, Florida

- Date: September 18, 2005
- Game time: 1:00 pm EDT
- Game weather: Partly Cloudy, 91 °F or 32.8 °C
- Game attendance: 64,777
- Referee: Terry McAulay
- TV announcers (CBS): Bill Macatee, Rich Gannon
- Box Score

Game information

First quarter

- No scoring plays

Second quarter

- TB – Team safety, 9:29. Buccaneers 2–0.
- TB – Mike Alstott 1 yard rush (Matt Bryant kick), 2:36. Buccaneers 9–0. Drive: 11 plays, 67 yards, 6:53.
- BUF – Rian Lindell 40-yard field goal, 1:01. Buccaneers 9–3. Drive: 6 plays, 31 yards, 1:35.

Third quarter

- TB – Cadillac Williams 3 yard rush (Matt Bryant kick), 10:12. Buccaneers 16–3. Drive: 9 plays, 80 yards, 5:03.

Fourth quarter

- TB – Matt Bryant 40 yard field goal, 9:22. Buccaneers 19–3. Drive: 8 plays, 54 yards, 5:23.

Top passers

- BUF – J.P. Losman – 11/28, 113 yards, 2 INT
- TB – Brian Griese – 16/22, 136 yards

Top rushers

- BUF – Willis McGahee – 13 rushes, 34 yards
- TB – Cadillac Williams – 24 rushes, 148 yards, TD

Top receivers

- BUF – Josh Reed – 6 receptions, 71 yards
- TB – Michael Clayton – 6 receptions, 84 yards

=== Week 3: vs. Atlanta Falcons ===
Week Three: Atlanta Falcons (1–1) at Buffalo Bills (1–1)

Quarter	1	2	3	4	Total
Falcons	7	10	0	7	24
Bills	3	10	3	0	16

at Ralph Wilson Stadium, Orchard Park, New York

- Date: September 25, 2005
- Game time: 1:00 pm EDT
- Game weather: Cloudy, 77 °F or 25.0 °C
- Game attendance: 72,032
- Referee: Scott Green
- TV announcers (Fox): Sam Rosen, Bill Maas, and Chris Myers
- Box Score

Game information

First quarter

- BUF – Rian Lindell 36-yard field goal, 9:32. Bills 3–0. Drive: 13 plays, 50 yards, 5:28.
- ATL – Dwayne Blakley 9 yard pass from Michael Vick (Todd Peterson kick), 3:44. Falcons 7–3. Drive: 10 plays, 84 yards, 5:48.

Second quarter

- BUF – Rian Lindell 41-yard field goal, 14:45. Falcons 7–6. Drive: 9 plays, 57 yards, 3:59.
- ATL – Michael Jenkins 15 yard pass from Michael Vick (Todd Peterson kick), 10:07. Falcons 14–6. Drive: 10 plays, 74 yards, 4:38.
- BUF – Willis McGahee 8 yard rush (Rian Lindell kick), 3:55. Falcons 14–13. Drive: 11 plays, 80 yards, 6:12.
- ATL – Todd Peterson 27-yard field goal, 0:00. Falcons 17–13. Drive: 9 plays, 82 yards, 1:08.

Third quarter

- BUF – Rian Lindell 30-yard field goal, 10:10. Falcons 17–16. Drive: 7 plays, 23 yards, 4:09.

Fourth quarter

- ATL – T. J. Duckett 12 yard rush (Todd Peterson kick), 12:07. Falcons 24–16. Drive: 9 plays, 65 yards, 5:14.

Top passers

- ATL – Michael Vick – 15/27, 167 yards, 2 TD, 1 INT
- BUF – J.P. Losman – 10/23, 75 yards, 1 INT

Top rushers

- ATL – Warrick Dunn – 15 rushes, 97 yards
- BUF – Willis McGahee – 27 rushes, 140 yards, TD

Top receivers

- ATL – Brian Finneran – 4 receptions, 57 yards
- BUF – Josh Reed – 2 receptions, 24 yards

- Linebacker Takeo Spikes was lost for the season after an injury to his right achilles tendon being torn.

=== Week 4: at New Orleans Saints ===
Week Four: Buffalo Bills (1–2) at New Orleans Saints (1–2)

Quarter	1	2	3	4	Total
Bills	7	0	0	0	7
Saints	0	13	0	6	19

at Alamo Dome, San Antonio, Texas

- Date: October 2, 2005
- Game time: 1:00 pm EDT / 12:00 pm CDT
- Game weather: None, domed stadium
- Game attendance: 58,688
- Referee: Bill Vinovich
- TV announcers (CBS): Don Criqui, Rich Gannon
- Box Score

Game information

First quarter

- BUF – Willis McGahee 1 yard rush (Rian Lindell kick), 9:40. Bills 7–0. Drive: 10 plays, 75 yards, 5:20.

Second quarter

- NO – John Carney 23-yard field goal, 9:05. Bills 7–3. Drive: 13 plays, 56 yards, 8:04.
- NO – Aaron Brooks 4 yard run (John Carney kick), 5:38. Saints 10–7. Drive: 5 plays, 23 yards, 3:01.
- NO – John Carney 40-yard field goal, 0:10. Saints 13–7. Drive: 6 plays, 43 yards, 1:13.

Third quarter

- No scoring plays

Fourth quarter

- NO – John Carney 20-yard field goal, 4:59. Saints 16–7. Drive: 11 plays, 48 yards, 6:15.
- NO – John Carney 37-yard field goal, 1:09. Saints 19–7. Drive: 8 plays, 75 yards, 2:59.

Top passers

- BUF – J.P. Losman – 7/15, 75 yards, 1 INT
- NO – Aaron Brooks – 15/26, 172 yards

Top rushers

- BUF – Willis McGahee – 16 rushes, 84 yards, TD
- NO – Deuce McAllister – 27 rushes, 130 yards

Top receivers

- BUF – Jonathan Smith – 2 receptions, 30 yards
- NO – Donté Stallworth – 8 receptions, 129 yards

=== Week 5: vs. Miami Dolphins ===
Week Five: Miami Dolphins (2–1) at Buffalo Bills (1–3)

Quarter	1	2	3	4	Total
Dolphins	0	0	7	7	14
Bills	10	7	0	3	20

at Ralph Wilson Stadium, Orchard Park, New York

- Date: October 9, 2005
- Game time: 1:00 pm EDT
- Game weather: Cloudy, 52 °F or 11.1 °C
- Game attendance: 72,160
- Referee: Walt Coleman
- TV announcers (CBS): Kevin Harlan, Randy Cross
- Box Score

Game information

First quarter

- BUF – Willis McGahee 1 yard run (Rian Lindell kick), 11:23. 7–0 Bills. Drive: 8 plays, 67 yards, 3:37.
- BUF – Rian Lindell 24-yard field goal, 4:15. 10–0 Bills. Drive: 11 plays, 51 yards, 5:38.

Second quarter

- BUF – Eric Moulds 2 yard pass from Kelly Holcomb (Rian Lindell kick), 8:08. Bills 17–0. Drive: 12 plays, 45 yards, 6:52.

Third quarter

- MIA – Will Heller 1 yard pass from Gus Frerotte (Olindo Mare kick), 5:50. Bills 17–7. Drive: 4 plays, 90 yards, 2:24.

Fourth quarter

- MIA – Randy McMichael 30 yard pass from Gus Frerotte (Olindo Mare kick), 8:18. Bills 17–14. Drive: 3 plays, 35 yards, 1:21.
- BUF – Rian Lindell 47-yard field goal, 4:35. Bills 20–14. Drive: 7 plays, 4 yards, 3:43.

Top passers

- BUF – Kelly Holcomb – 20/26, 169 yards, TD
- MIA – Gus Frerotte – 21/33, 226 yards, 2 TD, 3 INT

Top rushers

- BUF – Willis McGahee – 31 rushes, 86 yards, TD
- MIA – Ronnie Brown – 17 rushes, 97 yards

Top receivers

- BUF – Lee Evans – 3 receptions, 65 yards
- MIA – Marty Booker – 3 receptions, 72 yards

=== Week 6: vs. New York Jets ===
Week Six: New York Jets (2–3) at Buffalo Bills (2–3)

Quarter	1	2	3	4	Total
Jets	0	10	7	0	17
Bills	7	10	7	3	27

at Ralph Wilson Stadium, Orchard Park, New York

- Date: October 16, 2005
- Game time: 4:15 pm EDT
- Game weather: Cloudy, 52 °F or 11.1 °C
- Game attendance: 72,045
- Referee: Jeff Triplette
- TV announcers (CBS): Ian Eagle, Solomon Wilcots
- Box Score

Game information

First quarter

- BUF – Jonathan Smith 8 yard pass from Kelly Holcomb (Rian Lindell kick), 8:45. Bills 7–0. Drive: 10 plays, 60 yards, 6:15.

Second quarter

- BUF – Eric Moulds 15 yard pass from Kelly Holcomb (Rian Lindell kick), 10:05. Bills 14–0. Drive: 10 plays, 67 yards, 6:02.
- NYJ – Mike Nugent 44-yard field goal, 5:53. Bills 14–3. Drive: 5 plays, 53 yards, 1:48.
- NYJ – Curtis Martin 1 yard rush (Mike Nugent kick), 0:30. Bills 14–10. Drive: 7 plays, 91 yards, 1:55.
- BUF – Rian Lindell 50-yard field goal, 0:00. Bills 17–10. Drive: 2 plays, 21 yards, 0:30.

Third quarter

- BUF – Willis McGahee 1 yard rush (Rian Lindell kick), 6:32. Bills 24–10. Drive: 10 plays, 82 yards, 6:41.
- NYJ – Vinny Testaverde 1 yard rush (Mike Nugent kick), 1:41. Bills 24–17. Drive: 2 plays, 2 yards, 0:43.

Fourth quarter

- BUF – Rian Lindell 38-yard field goal, 5:54. Bills 27–17. Drive: 10 plays, 56 yards, 5:41.

Top passers

- BUF – Kelly Holcomb – 18/26, 172 yards, 2 TD, 2 INT
- NYJ – Vinny Testaverde – 12/26, 161 yards, 2 INT

Top rushes

- BUF – Willis McGahee – 29 rushes, 143 yards, TD
- NYJ – Curtis Martin – 18 rushes, 148 yards, TD

Top receivers

- BUF – Eric Moulds – 7 receptions, 63 yards, TD
- NYJ – Justin McCareins – 5 receptions, 116 yards

=== Week 7: at Oakland Raiders ===
Week Seven: Buffalo Bills (3–3) at Oakland Raiders (1–4)

Quarter	1	2	3	4	Total
Bills	7	3	0	7	17
Raiders	0	17	7	14	38

at McAfee Coliseum, Oakland, California

- Date: October 23, 2005
- Game time: 4:15 pm EDT / 1:15 pm PDT
- Game weather: Sunny, 59 °F or 15.0 °C
- Game attendance: 42,779
- Referee: Pete Morelli
- TV announcers (CBS): Bill Macatee, Rich Gannon
- Box Score

Game information

First quarter

- BUF – Lee Evans 5 yard pass from Kelly Holcomb (Rian Lindell kick), 6:37. Bills 7–0. Drive: 14 plays, 82 yards, 8:23.

Second quarter

- OAK – Sebastian Janikowski 25-yard field goal, 14:47. Bills 7–3. Drive: 10 plays, 72 yards, 2:55.
- OAK – Randy Moss 22 yard pass from Kerry Collins (Sebastian Janikowski kick), 11:43. Raiders 10–7. Drive: 3 plays, 35 yards, 1:26.
- BUF – Rian Lindell 41-yard field goal, 4:04. Tied 10–10. Drive: 4 plays, 6 yards, 1:01.
- OAK – LaMont Jordan 1 yard rush (Sebastian Janikowski kick), 0:40. Raiders 17–10. Drive: 9 plays, 60 yards, 3:24.

Third quarter

- OAK – LaMont Jordan 17 yard rush (Sebastian Janikowski kick), 10:10. Raiders 24–10. Drive: 9 plays, 80 yards, 4:50.

Fourth quarter

- BUF – Josh Reed 9 yard pass from Kelly Holcomb (Rian Lindell kick), 14:53. Raiders 24–17. Drive: 7 plays, 38 yards, 2:56.
- OAK – LaMont Jordan 7 yard rush (Sebastian Janikowski kick), 8:49. Raiders 31–17. Drive: 10 plays, 77 yards, 6:04.
- OAK – Zack Crockett 2 yard rush (Sebastian Janikowski kick), 0:14. Raiders 38–17. Drive: 15 plays, 69 yards, 7:27.

Top passers

- BUF – Kelly Holcomb – 19/27, 159 yards, 2 TD
- OAK – Kerry Collins – 19/27, 261 yards, TD

Top rushers

- BUF – Willis McGahee – 16 rushes, 50 yards
- OAK – LaMont Jordan – 28 rushes, 122 yards, 3 TD

Top receivers

- BUF – Willis McGahee – 3 receptions, 36 yards
  Eric Moulds – 4 receptions, 36 yards
- OAK – Doug Gabriel – 5 receptions, 101 yards

=== Week 8: at New England Patriots ===
Week Eight: Buffalo Bills (3–4) at New England Patriots (3–3)

Quarter	1	2	3	4	Total
Bills	0	3	7	6	16
Patriots	0	0	7	14	21

at Gillette Stadium, Foxborough, Massachusetts

- Date: October 30, 2005
- Game time: 8:37 pm EDT
- Game weather: Cloudy, 58 °F or 14.4 °C
- Game attendance: 68,756
- Referee: Ron Winter
- TV announcers (ESPN): Mike Patrick, Joe Theismann, Paul Maguire, and Suzy Kolber
- Box Score

Game information

First quarter

- No scoring plays

Second quarter

- BUF – Rian Lindell 23-yard field goal, 8:41. Bills 3–0. Drive: 11 plays, 49 yards, 5:35.

Third quarter

- NE – Deion Branch 33 yard pass from Tom Brady (Adam Vinatieri kick), 12:32. Patriots 7–3. Drive: 5 plays, 70 yards, 2:28.
- BUF – Eric Moulds 55 yard pass from Kelly Holcomb (Rian Lindell kick), 11:09. Bills 10–7. Drive: 3 plays, 83 yards, 1:23.

Fourth quarter

- BUF – Rian Lindell 35-yard field goal, 13:02. Bills 13–7. Drive: 12 plays, 80 yards, 6:16.
- BUF – Rian Lindell 41-yard field goal, 10:07. Bills 16–7. Drive: 7 plays, 6 yards, 2:42.
- NE – Corey Dillon 1 yard rush (Adam Vinatieri kick), 7:06. Bills 16–14. Drive: 6 plays, 61 yards, 3:01.
- NE – Corey Dillon 1 yard rush (Adam Vinatieri kick), 5:32. Patriots 21–16. Drive: 2 plays, 23 yards, 0:42.

Top passers

- BUF – Kelly Holcomb – 20/33, 262 yards, TD, INT
- NE – Tom Brady – 14/21, 199 yards, TD

Top rushers

- BUF – Willis McGahee – 31 rushes, 136 yards
- NE – Corey Dillon – 18 rushes, 72 yards, 2 TD

Top receivers

- BUF – Eric Moulds – 9 receptions, 125 yards, TD
- NE – Deion Branch – 3 receptions, 92 yards, TD

=== Week 10: vs. Kansas City Chiefs ===
Week Ten: Kansas City Chiefs (5–3) at Buffalo Bills (3–5)

Quarter	1	2	3	4	Total
Chiefs	3	0	0	0	3
Bills	0	7	7	0	14

at Ralph Wilson Stadium, Orchard Park, New York

- Date: November 13, 2005
- Game time: 1:00 pm EDT
- Game weather: Cloudy, 61 °F or 16.1 °C
- Game attendance: 72,093
- Referee: Tom White
- TV announcers (CBS): Kevin Harlan, Randy Cross
- Box Score

Game information

First quarter

- KC – Lawrence Tynes 35-yard field goal, 1:17. Chiefs 3–0. Drive: 7 plays, 45 yards, 4:05.

Second quarter

- BUF – Lee Evans 33 yard pass from J.P. Losman (Rian Lindell kick), 1:53. Bills 7–3. Drive: 7 plays, 66 yards, 2:44.

Third quarter

- BUF – Lee Evans 29 yard pass from J.P. Losman (Rian Lindell kick), 8:16. Bills 14–3. Drive: 2 plays, 27 yards, 1:17.

Fourth quarter

- No scoring plays

Top passers

- BUF – J.P. Losman – 9/16, 137 yards, 2 TD
- KC – Trent Green – 23/40, 220 yards, 3 INT

Top rushers

- BUF – Willis McGahee – 20 rushes, 66 yards
- KC – Larry Johnson – 27 rushes, 132 yards

Top receivers

- BUF – Lee Evans – 3 receptions, 66 yards, 2 TD
- KC – Tony Gonzalez – 8 receptions, 81 yards

- On the second score of the game wide receiver Lee Evans and Chiefs cornerback Eric Warfield collided into a stadium security guard who sustained a leg injury and had to be carted off the field.

=== Week 11: at San Diego Chargers ===
Week Eleven: Buffalo Bills (4–5) at San Diego Chargers (5–4)

Quarter	1	2	3	4	Total
Bills	3	7	0	0	10
Chargers	14	21	3	10	48

at Qualcomm Stadium, San Diego, California

- Date: November 20, 2005
- Game time: 4:15 pm EDT / 1:15 pm PDT
- Game weather: Partly Cloudy, 78 °F or 25.6 °C
- Game attendance: 65,602
- Referee: Bill Leavy
- TV announcers (CBS): Gus Johnson, Steve Tasker, and Scott Kaplan
- Box Score

Game information

First quarter

- SD – LaDainian Tomlinson 1 yard rush (Nate Kaeding kick), 9:31. Chargers 7–0. Drive: 9 plays, 75 yards, 5:29.
- BUF – Rian Lindell 53-yard field goal, 6:40. Chargers 7–3. Drive: 6 plays, 12 yards, 2:51.
- SD – Antonio Gates 27 yard pass from Drew Brees (Nate Kaeding kick), 0:32. Chargers 14–3. Drive: 10 plays, 72 yards, 6:08.

Second quarter

- SD – Eric Parker 23 yard pass from Drew Brees (Nate Kaeding kick), 7:22. Chargers 21–3. Drive: 8 plays, 70 yards, 3:54.
- SD – Lorenzo Neal 2 yard pass from Drew Brees (Nate Kaeding kick), 3:12. Chargers 28–3. Drive: 6 plays, 22 yards, 7:08.
- BUF – Daimon Shelton 3 yard pass from J.P. Losman (Rian Lindell kick), 1:23. Chargers 28–10. Drive: 8 plays, 55 yards, 1:49.
- SD – Keenan McCardell 29 yard pass from Drew Brees (Nate Kaeding kick), 0:37. Chargers 35–10. Drive: 6 plays, 83 yards, 0:46.

Third quarter

- SD – Nate Kaeding 28-yard field goal, 4:01. Chargers 38–10. Drive: 11 plays, 75 yards, 6:31.

Fourth quarter

- SD – Nate Kaeding 38-yard field goal, 14:14. Chargers 41–10. Drive: 5 plays, 21 yards, 2:02.
- SD – Michael Turner 8 yard rush (Nate Kaeding kick), 4:06. Chargers 48–10. Drive: 10 plays, 64 yards, 7:03.

Top passers

- BUF – J.P. Losman – 20/36, 168 yards, TD, INT
- SD – Drew Brees – 28/33, 339 yards, 4 TD

Top rushers

- BUF – Willis McGahee – 10 rushes, 39 yards
- SD – LaDainian Tomlinson – 19 rushes, 67 yards, TD

Top receivers

- BUF – Lee Evans – 4 receptions, 69 yards
- SD – Keenan McCardell – 6 receptions, 88 yards, TD

=== Week 12: vs. Carolina Panthers ===
Week Twelve: Carolina Panthers (7–3) at Buffalo Bills (4–6)

Quarter	1	2	3	4	Total
Panthers	0	3	3	7	13
Bills	0	6	0	3	9

at Ralph Wilson Stadium, Orchard Park, New York

- Date: November 27, 2005
- Game time: 1:00 pm EDT
- Game weather: Cloudy, 41 °F or 5.0 °C
- Game attendance: 71,440
- Referee: Mike Carey
- TV announcers (Fox): Sam Rosen, Bill Maas, and Jay Glazer
- Box Score

Game information

First quarter

- No scoring plays

Second quarter

- CAR – John Kasay 25-yard field goal, 14:56. Panthers 3–0. Drive: 16 plays, 74 yards, 11:18.
- BUF – Rian Lindell 31-yard field goal, 2:03. Tied 3–3. Drive: 13 plays, 76 yards, 6:45.
- BUF – Rian Lindell 45-yard field goal, 0:00. Bills 6–3. Drive: 8 plays, 7 yards, 1:14.

Third quarter

- CAR – John Kasay 25-yard field goal, 0:00. Tied 6–6. Drive: 6 plays, 49 yards, 3:06.

Fourth quarter

- BUF – Rian Lindell 33-yard field goal, 10:04. Bills 9–6. Drive: 12 plays, 48 yards, 4:56.
- CAR – Michael Gaines 3 yard pass from Jake Delhomme (John Kasay kick), 2:16. Panthers 13–9. Drive: 14 plays, 68 yards, 7:48.

Top passers

- BUF – J.P. Losman – 16/29, 197 yards, INT
- CAR – Jake Delhomme – 20/27, 191 yards, TD

Top rushers

- BUF – Willis McGahee – 21 rushes, 53 yards
- CAR – DeShaun Foster – 22 rushes, 74 yards

Top receivers

- BUF – Eric Moulds – 7 receptions, 84 yards
- CAR – Steve Smith Sr. – 3 receptions, 55 yards

=== Week 13: at Miami Dolphins ===
Week Thirteen: Buffalo Bills (4–7) at Miami Dolphins (4–7)

Quarter	1	2	3	4	Total
Bills	21	0	2	0	23
Dolphins	0	3	0	21	24

at Dolphins Stadium, Miami Gardens, Florida

- Date: December 4, 2005
- Game time: 1:00 pm EDT
- Game weather: Cloudy, 77 °F or 25.0 °C
- Game attendance: 72,051
- Referee: Ed Hochuli
- TV announcers (CBS): Don Criqui, Steve Beuerlein
- Box Score

Game information

First quarter

- BUF – Lee Evans 46 yard pass from J.P. Losman (Rian Lindell kick), 12:47. Bills 7–0. Drive: 4 plays, 61 yards, 2:13.
- BUF – Lee Evans 56 yard pass from J.P. Losman (Rian Lindell kick), 11:07. Bills 14–0. Drive: 1 play, 56 yards, 0:11.
- BUF – Lee Evans 4 yard pass from J.P. Losman (Rian Lindell kick), 2:14. Bills 21–0. Drive: 6 plays, 26 yards, 2:43.

Second quarter

- MIA – Olindo Mare 23-yard field goal, 0:43. Bills 21–3. Drive: 11 plays, 57 yards, 2:15.

Third quarter

- BUF – Team safety, 10:12. Bills 23–3.

Fourth quarter

- MIA – Ricky Williams 5 yard rush (Olindo Mare kick), 11:35. Bills 23–10. Drive: 9 plays, 70 yards, 2:18.
- MIA – Ronnie Brown 23 yard pass from Sage Rosenfels (Olindo Mare kick), 7:35. Bills 23–17. Drive: 8 plays, 49 yards, 2:18.
- MIA – Chris Chambers 4 yard pass from Sage Rosenfels (Olindo Mare kick), 0:06. Dolphins 24–23. Drive: 10 plays, 73 yards, 1:45.

Top passers

- BUF – J.P. Losman – 13/26, 224 yards, 3 TD, INT
- MIA – Sage Rosenfels – 22/37, 272 yards, 2 TD, INT

Top rushers

- BUF – Willis McGahee – 27 rushes, 81 yards
- MIA – Ricky Williams – 11 rushes, 46 yards, TD

Top receivers

- BUF – Lee Evans – 5 receptions, 117 yards, 3 TD
- MIA – Chris Chambers – 15 receptions, 238 yards, TD

=== Week 14: vs. New England Patriots ===
Week Fourteen: New England Patriots (7–5) at Buffalo Bills (4–8)

Quarter	1	2	3	4	Total
Patriots	7	7	7	14	35
Bills	0	0	0	7	7

at Ralph Wilson Stadium, Orchard Park, New York

- Date: December 11, 2005
- Game time: 1:00 pm EDT
- Game weather: Snow, 30 °F or −1.1 °C
- Game attendance: 71,810
- Referee: Bill Carollo
- TV announcers (CBS): Kevin Harlan, Randy Cross
- Box Score

Game information

First quarter

- NE – Tom Brady 3 yard rush (Adam Vinatieri kick), 5:33. Patriots 7–0. Drive: 8 plays, 80 yards, 3:33.

Second quarter

- NE – Corey Dillon 12 yard rush (Adam Vinatieri kick), 8:13. Patriots 14–0. Drive: 9 plays, 49 yards, 4:21.

Third quarter

- NE – Troy Brown 5 yard pass from Tom Brady (Adam Vinatieri kick), 5:27. Patriots 21–0. Drive: 7 plays, 76 yards, 4:05.

Fourth quarter

- NE – Christian Fauria 2 yard pass from Tom Brady (Adam Vinatieri kick), 8:18. Patriots 28–0. Drive: 14 plays, 78 yards, 7:05.
- NE – James Sanders 39 yard interception return (Adam Vinatieri kick), 2:43. Patriots 35–0.
- BUF – Josh Reed 51 yard pass from J.P. Losman (Rian Lindell kick), 2:14. Patriots 35–7. Drive: 2 plays, 51 yards, 0:09.

Top passers

- BUF – J.P. Losman – 10/27, 181 yards, TD, 3 INT
- NE – Tom Brady – 29/38, 329 yards, 2 TD, 2 INT

Top rushers

- BUF – J.P. Losman – 1 rush, 7 yards
- NE – Corey Dillon – 22 rushes, 102 yards, TD

Top receivers

- BUF – Lee Evans – 4 receptions, 83 yards
- NE – Deion Branch – 5 receptions, 83 yards

=== Week 15: vs. Denver Broncos ===
Week Fifteen: Denver Broncos (10–3) at Buffalo Bills (4–9)

Quarter	1	2	3	4	Total
Broncos	0	7	14	7	28
Bills	7	0	3	7	17

at Ralph Wilson Stadium, Orchard Park, New York

- Date: December 17, 2005
- Game time: 8:35 pm EDT
- Game weather: Clear, 28 °F or −2.2 °C
- Game attendance: 71,887
- Referee: Bernie Kukar
- TV announcers (ESPN): Mike Tirico, Sterling Sharpe, and Suzy Kolber
- Box Score

Game information

First quarter

- BUF – Willis McGahee 1 yard rush (Rian Lindell kick), 10:10. Bills 7–0. Drive: 9 plays, 56 yards, 4:50.

Second quarter

- DEN – Rod Smith 3 yard pass from Jake Plummer (Jason Elam kick), 0:43. Tied 7–7. Drive: 14 plays, 73 yards, 4:51.

Third quarter

- DEN – Wesley Duke 1 yard pass from Jake Plummer (Jason Elam kick), 10:53. Broncos 14–7. Drive: 10 plays, 69 yards, 4:07.
- BUF – Rian Lindell 31-yard field goal, 5:11. Broncos 14–10. Drive: 10 plays, 62 yards, 5:42.
- DEN – Mike Anderson 11 yard rush (Jason Elam kick), 0:19. Broncos 21–10. Drive: 9 plays, 70 yards, 4:52.

Fourth quarter

- DEN – Mike Anderson 6 yard rush (Jason Elam kick), 5:49. Broncos 28–10. Drive: 15 plays, 71 yards, 8:22.
- BUF – Joe Burns 19 yard pass from Kelly Holcomb (Rian Lindell kick), 3:49. Broncos 28–17. Drive: 7 plays, 58 yards, 2:00.

Top passers

- BUF – Kelly Holcomb – 22/35, 202 yards, TD
- DEN – Jake Plummer – 20/37, 259 yards, 2 TD

Top rushers

- BUF – Shaud Williams – 5 rushes, 40 yards
- DEN – Mike Anderson – 21 rushes, 97 yards, 2 TD

Top receivers

- BUF – Eric Moulds – 9 receptions, 110 yards
- DEN – Rod Smith – 11 receptions, 137 yards, TD

=== Week 16: at Cincinnati Bengals ===
Week Sixteen: Buffalo Bills (4–10) at Cincinnati Bengals (11–3)

Quarter	1	2	3	4	Total
Bills	6	7	7	17	37
Bengals	0	14	10	3	27

at Paul Brown Stadium, Cincinnati, Ohio

- Date: December 24, 2005
- Game time: 1:00 pm EDT
- Game weather: Cloudy, 51 °F or 10.6 °C
- Game attendance: 65,485
- Referee: Pete Morelli
- TV announcers (CBS): Ian Eagle, Solomon Wilcots
- Box Score

Game information

First quarter

- BUF – Rian Lindell 21-yard field goal, 11:44. Bills 3–0. Drive: 5 plays, 65 yards, 1:43.
- BUF – Rian Lindell 24-yard field goal, 5:37. Bills 6–0. Drive: 8 plays, 40 yards, 4:13.

Second quarter

- CIN – Tab Perry 2 yard rush (Shayne Graham kick), 14:29. Bengals 7–6. Drive: 13 plays, 69 yards, 5:20.
- BUF – Lee Evans 3 yard pass from Kelly Holcomb (Rian Lindell kick), 9:37. Bills 13–7. Drive: 9 plays, 67 yards, 4:52.
- CIN – Chad Johnson 41 yard pass from Carson Palmer (Shayne Graham kick), 1:17. Bengals 14–13. Drive: 6 plays, 81 yards, 2:55.

Third quarter

- CIN – Shayne Graham 31-yard field goal, 4:09. Bengals 17–13. Drive: 13 plays, 49 yards, 7:27.
- BUF – Terrence McGee 99 yard kickoff return (Rian Lindell kick), 3:57. Bills 20–17.
- CIN – Chris Henry 27 yard pass from Carson Palmer (Shayne Graham kick), 1:36. Bengals 24–20. Drive: 6 plays, 74 yards, 2:21.

Fourth quarter

- BUF – Kelly Holcomb 1 yard rush (Rian Lindell kick), 11:29. Bills 27–24. Drive: 9 plays, 56 yards, 5:07.
- CIN – Shayne Graham 27-yard field goal, 7:27. Tied 27–27. Drive: 10 plays, 39 yards, 4:02.
- BUF – Rian Lindell 22-yard field goal, 0:58. Bills 30–27. Drive: 13 plays, 66 yards, 6:29.
- BUF – Terrence McGee 46 yard interception return (Rian Lindell kick), 0:35. Bills 37–27.

Top passers

- BUF – Kelly Holcomb – 24/31, 308 yards, TD, INT
- CIN – Carson Palmer – 25/36, 266 yards, 2 TD, 2 INT

Top rushers

- BUF – Willis McGahee – 23 rushes, 66 yards
- CIN – Rudi Johnson – 18 rushes, 88 yards

Top receivers

- BUF – Lee Evans – 5 receptions, 107 yards, TD
- CIN – Chad Johnson – 9 receptions, 117 yards, TD

=== Week 17: at New York Jets ===
Week Seventeen: Buffalo Bills (5–10) at New York Jets (3–12)

Quarter	1	2	3	4	Total
Bills	3	10	10	3	26
Jets	3	14	3	10	30

at Giants Stadium, East Rutherford, New Jersey

- Date: January 1, 2006
- Game time: 1:00 pm EDT
- Game weather: Cloudy, 35 °F or 1.7 °C
- Game attendance: 76,822
- Referee: Gerry Austin
- TV announcers (CBS): Ian Eagle, Solomon Wilcots
- Box Score

Game information

First quarter

- BUF – Rian Lindell 21-yard field goal, 9:29. Bills 3–0. Drive: 8 plays, 53 yards, 3:38.
- NYJ – Mike Nugent 49-yard field goal, 4:58. Tied 3–3. Drive: 6 plays, 13 yards, 2:31.

Second quarter

- BUF – Rian Lindell 24-yard field goal, 14:12. Bills 6–3. Drive: 11 plays, 62 yards, 5:46.
- NYJ – Cedric Houston 3 yard rush (Mike Nugent kick), 13:31. Jets 10–6. Drive: 2 plays, 46 yards, 0:41.
- NYJ – Mark Brown 33 yard interception return (Mike Nugent kick), 13:15. Jets 17–6.
- BUF – Eric Moulds 22 yard pass from Kelly Holcomb (Rian Lindell kick), 3:57. Jets 17–13. Drive: 10 plays, 67 yards, 4:52.

Third quarter

- BUF – Rian Lindell 52-yard field goal, 11:52. Jets 17–16. Drive: 8 plays, 27 yards, 3:08.
- NYJ – Mike Nugent 25-yard field goal, 5:26. Jets 20–16. Drive: 13 plays, 69 yards, 6:26.
- BUF – Roscoe Parrish 3 yard pass from Kelly Holcomb (Rian Lindell kick), 0:36. Bills 23–20. Drive: 8 plays, 50 yards, 4:50.

Fourth quarter

- NYJ – Mike Nugent 34-yard field goal, 10:35. Tied 23–23. Drive: 12 plays, 55 yards, 5:01.
- BUF – Rian Lindell 36-yard field goal, 6:13. Bills 26–23. Drive: 10 plays, 47 yards, 4:22.
- NYJ – Justin Miller 95 yard kick return (Mike Nugent kick), 5:58. Jets 30–26.

Top passers

- BUF – Kelly Holcomb – 23/37, 184 yards, 2 TD, 4 INT
- NYJ – Brooks Bollinger – 11/20, 153 yards

Top rushers

- BUF – Willis McGahee – 22 rushes, 113 yards
- NYJ – Cedric Houston – 16 rushes, 55 yards, TD

Top receivers

- BUF – Eric Moulds – 8 receptions, 96 yards, TD
- NYJ – Laveranues Coles – 4 receptions, 79 yards
