= Leon Hall =

American football player (born 1984)

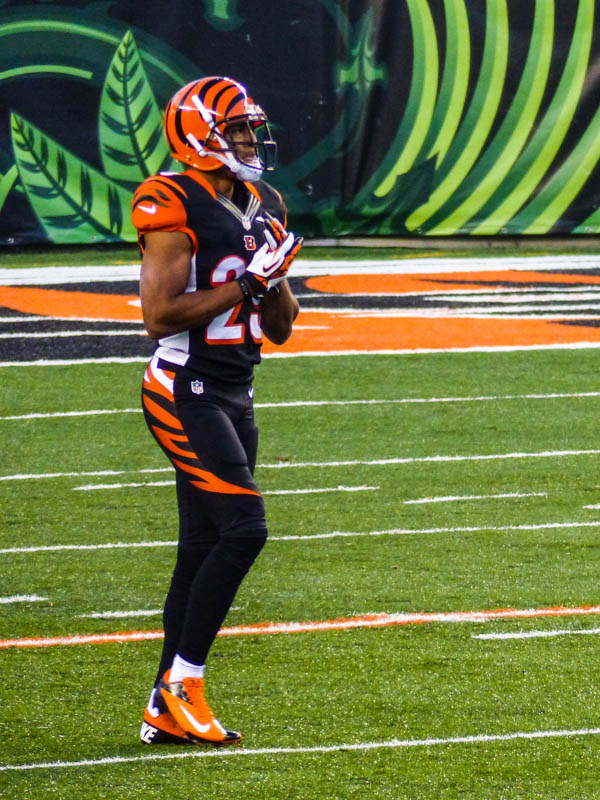
- Hall with the Cincinnati Bengals in 2013

No. 29, 25, 20
- Position: Cornerback

Personal information
- Born: December 9, 1984 (age 41); Vista, California, U.S.
- Listed height: 5 ft 11 in (1.80 m)
- Listed weight: 195 lb (88 kg)

Career information
- High school: Vista
- College: Michigan (2003–2006)
- NFL draft: 2007: 1st round, 18th overall pick

Career history
- Cincinnati Bengals (2007–2015); New York Giants (2016); San Francisco 49ers (2017); Oakland Raiders (2018)

Awards and highlights
- Second-team All-Pro (2009); PFWA All-Rookie Team (2007); Consensus All-American (2006); First-team All-Big Ten (2006); Second-team All-Big Ten (2005)

Career NFL statistics
- Total tackles: 542
- Pass deflections: 117
- Interceptions: 27
- Forced fumbles: 6
- Fumble recoveries: 2
- Defensive touchdowns: 3
- Stats at Pro Football Reference

Leon Lastarza Hall (born December 9, 1984) is an American former professional football player who was a cornerback in the National Football League (NFL). He played college football for the Michigan Wolverines and earned consensus All-American honors. Hall was selected by the Cincinnati Bengals in the first round of the 2007 NFL draft and also played for the New York Giants, San Francisco 49ers, and Oakland Raiders.

== Early life ==
Leon Hall was born in Vista, California. He attended Vista High School where he played wide receiver and cornerback. He also played in the 2003 U.S. Army All-American Bowl. After high school, he committed to the University of Michigan without taking an official visit.

== Professional career ==
Pre-draft measurables
Height	Weight	Arm length	Hand span	40-yard dash	10-yard split	20-yard split	20-yard shuttle	Three-cone drill	Vertical jump	Broad jump	Bench press
5 ft 11 1/4 in (1.81 m)	193 lb (88 kg)	33 3/8 in (0.85 m)	9 in (0.23 m)	4.41 s	1.45 s	2.54 s	4.07 s	6.50 s	37.5 in (0.95 m)	10 ft 5 in (3.18 m)	15 reps
All values from NFL Combine

=== Cincinnati Bengals ===
==== 2007 ====
The Cincinnati Bengals selected Hall in the first round (18th overall) of the 2007 NFL draft. Hall was the second cornerback drafted in 2007, behind Pittsburgh's Darrelle Revis (14th overall). On July 29, 2007, the Bengals signed Hall to a five-year $13.60 million contract with $8.20 million guaranteed.

Hall entered training camp slated as the third cornerback and first-team nickelback on the depth chart. Head coach Marvin Lewis officially named him the third cornerback and nickelback to begin the season, behind Deltha O'Neal and Johnathan Joseph.

He made his professional regular season debut and first career start in the Cincinnati Bengals' season-opener against the Baltimore Ravens and had three combined tackles, two pass deflections, and a fumble recovery in their 27–20 victory. He earned the start over Johnathan Joseph. On September 23, 2007, Hall recorded two solo tackles, broke up a pass, and made his first career interception off a pass by quarterback Matt Hasselbeck during a 24–21 loss at the Seattle Seahawks in Week 4. In Week 9, Hall recorded five combined tackles, a pass deflection, and an interception during a 33–21 loss at the Buffalo Bills. Defensive coordinator Chuck Bresnahan named him the starting cornerback for Week 10, replacing Deltha O'Neal in the starting lineup. In Week 10, he recorded seven solo tackles, broke up two passes, and intercepted a pass by Kyle Boller in the Bengals' 21–7 victory at the Baltimore Ravens. On December 2, 2007, Hall collected a season-high ten combined tackles (seven solo) in a 24–10 loss at the Pittsburgh Steelers in Week 13. He finished his rookie season in 2007 with 68 combined tackles (54 solo), 12 pass deflections, and five interceptions in 16 games and ten starts. Hall finished the 2007 season as the Bengals' interception leader with five and tied a team record for most interceptions in a rookie season.

==== 2008 ====
Hall entered training camp as a starting cornerback after Deltha O'Neal was granted his release and defensive coordinator Chuck Bresnahan was fired after the defense finished 28th in total yards. Head coach Marvin Lewis officially named Hall and Johnathan Joseph the starting duo to begin the regular season.

On December 21, 2008, Hall recorded two solo tackles, three pass deflections, and made three interceptions during a 14–0 victory at the Cleveland Browns in Week 16. He intercepted three passes by quarterback Ken Dorsey that were originally intended for wide receiver and former Michigan teammate Braylon Edwards. Hall returned the second interception for a 51-yard touchdown in the second quarter, marking his first career pick six. The following week, he tied a season-high eight solo tackles and a pass deflection during a 16–6 victory against the Kansas City Chiefs in Week 17. His three interceptions tied a franchise record for most interceptions in a single game. Hall completed the 2007 season with a career-high 75 combined tackles (61 solo), a career-high 24 pass break-ups, three interceptions, and a touchdown in 16 games and 16 starts.

==== 2009 ====
Defensive coordinator Mike Zimmer retained Hall and Joseph as the starting cornerbacks to begin 2009. He was involved in a memorable play in the Bengals week 1 game against the Denver Broncos. With the Bengals leading 7-6 late in the 4th quarter, the Broncos were attempting to get into field goal range. On 2nd down, Broncos quarterback Kyle Orton threw a pass to the outside with Hall in coverage. Hall tipped the pass into the air. However, the ball was tipped in-bounds instead of out of bounds. As a result, Brandon Stokley made the catch off the ricochet and ran it 87 yards for a go-ahead and game-winning touchdown, giving Denver a 12-7 win. This play is the longest game winning touchdown with under a minute to play in NFL history. In Week 6, Hall collected a season-high 12 combined tackles (ten solo) and deflected a pass during a 28–17 loss to the Houston Texans. The following week, he made seven combined tackles, a season-high four pass deflections, and intercepted two passes by quarterback Jay Cutler during a 45–10 win against the Chicago Bears in Week 7. Hall finished the 2009 season with 71 combined tackles (58 solo), 24 pass break-ups, two forced fumbles, and a career-high six interceptions.

==== 2010 ====
Hall and Joseph returned as the Bengals' starting cornerbacks for the third consecutive season and began establishing themselves as a premier cornerback tandem. The AFC North blog ranked them the third best duo in the league behind Al Harris/Charles Woodson (Packers) and Darrelle Revis/Lito Sheppard (Jets).

On September 26, 2010, Hall recorded a season-high six combined tackles, two pass deflections, and intercepted a pass by rookie quarterback Jimmy Clausen in a 20–7 victory at the Carolina Panthers in Week 3. The following week, he recorded two solo tackles, a pass deflection, and intercepted a pass by Seneca Wallace in the Bengals' 23–20 loss at the Cleveland Browns in Week 4. Hall completed the 2010 season with 44 combined tackles (33 solo), 11 assists, and four interceptions in 16 games and 16 starts.

==== 2011 ====
On September 2, 2011, the Cincinnati Bengals signed Hall to a four-year, $39 million contract extension with $14.10 guaranteed and a signing bonus of $9 million.

Head coach Marvin Lewis chose Hall and Nate Clements to be the starting cornerbacks to begin the regular season after Johnathan Joseph departed for the Houston Texans during free agency. On November 13, 2011, Hall tore his left Achilles tendon in a Week 10 loss against the Pittsburgh Steelers and was placed on injured reserve the following day. He ended the season with 32 combined tackles (29 solo), seven pass deflections, and two interceptions in nine games and nine starts.

==== 2012 ====
Hall returned to training camp in 2012 and saw competition for his starting job from 2012 first round pick Dre Kirkpatrick. The Bengals also signed free agents Jason Allen and Terence Newman to bring their total to six cornerbacks who are former first round picks. Head coach Marvin Lewis named Hall and Nate Clements the starting cornerbacks to start the regular season.

In Week 2, Hall recorded a season-high seven assisted tackle and two pass deflections during a 34–27 victory against the Cleveland Browns. He missed two games (Weeks 3–4) after injuring his hamstring in Week 2. On December 23, 2012, Hall deflected a pass and returned an interception for a 15-yard touchdown in the Bengals' 13–10 victory at the Pittsburgh Steelers in Week 16. He finished the season with 38 combined tackles (24 solo), 11 passes defensed, two interceptions, and a touchdown in 14 games and 14 starts.

The Cincinnati Bengals finished second in the AFC North with a 10–6 record and clinched a wildcard berth. On January 6, 2013, Hall started in the AFC Wildcard Game and recorded four solo tackles, a pass deflection, and returned an interception for a 21-yard touchdown in their 19–13 loss at the Houston Texans.

==== 2013 ====
Defensive coordinator Mike Zimmer retained Hall as a starting cornerback to start the regular season, along with Terence Newman. Hall started in the Cincinnati Bengals' season-opener at the Chicago Bears and recorded a season-high seven combined tackles and two pass deflections in their 24–21 loss. He was inactive for two games (Weeks 4–5) due to a hamstring injury. On October 20, 2013, Hall sustained an injury while breaking up a pass to Calvin Johnson in the first quarter of the Bengals' 27–24 victory at the Detroit Lions in Week 7. On October 29, 2013, the Cincinnati Bengals officially placed Hall on injured reserve after he was diagnosed with a torn Achilles tendon. Hall was limited to 20 combined tackles (14 solo), five pass deflections, and an interception in five games and five starts.

==== 2014 ====
Head coach Marvin Lewis retained Hall and Newman as the starting cornerback duo for the second consecutive season, ahead of Adam "Pacman" Jones, Dre Kirkpatrick, and 2014 first round pick Darqueze Dennard. In Week 5, Hall collected a season-high eight combined tackles during a 43–17 loss at the New England Patriots. He was inactive for the Bengals' Week 10 loss to the Cleveland Browns after sustaining a concussion the previous week. He completed the 2014 season with 67 combined tackles (48 solo), eight pass deflections, and an interception in 15 games and 15 starts.

==== 2015 ====
Defensive coordinator Paul Guenther held an open competition for the jobs at starting cornerback after replacing Mike Zimmer who became head coach for the Minnesota Vikings. Hall competed against Adam Jones, Dre Kirkpatrick, and Darqueze Dennard. Head coach Marvin lewis named Hall the third cornerback on the depth chart to begin the regular season, behind Kirkpatrick and Jones, marking the first time Hall began a season as a backup.

On November 29, 2015, Hall recorded six combined tackles, two pass deflections, and returned an interception for a 19-yard touchdown during a 31–7 victory against the St. Louis Rams in Week 10. Hall was awarded the AFC Defensive Player of the Week for his performance. Throughout the season, Hall dealt with a back injury and was sidelined for the Bengals' Week 13 win at the Cleveland Browns. Hall sustained a concussion during a Week 17 victory against the Baltimore Ravens. He finished the season with 55 combined tackles (44 solo), nine pass deflections, two interceptions, and a touchdown in 15 games and four starts.

The Cincinnati Bengals finished atop their division with a 12–4 record. On January 9, 2016, Hall started in the AFC Wildcard Game and recorded two solo tackles and a pass deflection during an 18–16 loss to the Pittsburgh Steelers. He received an overall grade of 78.4 from Pro Football Focus in 2015 and primarily played slot corner.

Hall became an unrestricted free agent in 2016 and attended private visits with the Dallas Cowboys and Arizona Cardinals. It was speculated that Hall remain unsigned due to a back surgery he underwent in the beginning of the offseason to repair a disc injury. Hall required epidurals to play throughout the injury in the second half of the season. Hall remained a free agent, but received interest from the Cincinnati Bengals after they lost rookie 2016 first round pick William Jackson III to injury. It was reported that Hall declined a contract offer to return to the Bengals and chose to sign with the New York Giants instead.

=== 2016 ===
On August 4, 2016, the New York Giants signed Hall to a one-year contract, $2 million contract with a signing bonus of $115,000.

Throughout training camp, Hall competed against Eli Apple and Trevin Wade to be the first-team nickelback and third cornerback on the depth chart. Head coach Ben McAdoo named Hall the fifth cornerback on the depth chart to begin the regular season, behind Janoris Jenkins, Dominique Rodgers-Cromartie, Eli Apple, and Trevin Wade.

Hall spent the season-opener on special teams, but quickly surpassed Trevin Wade on the depth chart and became the Giants' fourth cornerback option for the following game. On September 16, 2016, Hall recorded five combined tackles and made his first career sack on Drew Brees during a 16–13 victory against the New Orleans Saints in Week 2. In Week 4, he collected a season-high seven combined tackles in the Giants' 24–10 loss at the Minnesota Vikings in Week 4. He became the third cornerback on the depth chart after Apple injured his hamstring and was sidelined for three games (Weeks 4–5). Hall was surpassed on the depth chart by Trevin Wade and Coty Sensabaugh and was a healthy scratch for four games (Weeks 9–12). He finished the season with 31 combined tackles (21 solo), two pass deflections, two sacks, and an interception in 12 games and two starts. Pro Football Focus gave Hall an overall grade of 75.9, which ranked him as the 43rd best cornerback in 2016.

==== 2017 ====
Hall became an unrestricted free agent after his lone season with the New York Giants. On May 31, 2017, Hall attended a private meeting with the San Francisco 49ers, but was not signed to contract.

=== San Francisco 49ers ===
On October 10, 2017, the San Francisco 49ers signed Hall to a one-year, $1 million contract for the league minimum as a ten-year veteran. The 49ers signed Hall after cornerback Asa Jackson was placed on injured reserve. Head coach Kyle Shanahan named Hall the fourth cornerback on the depth chart, behind Ahkello Witherspoon, Dontae Johnson, and K'Waun Williams. Hall was a healthy scratch for the 49ers' Week 6 loss at the Washington Redskins. On October 19, 2017, the 49ers released Hall, but was re-signed five days later after K'Waun Williams sustained a quadriceps injury. In Week 16, Hall recorded a season-high five solo tackles during a 44–33 win against the Jacksonville Jaguars. Hall finished the 2017 season with 16 combined tackles (15 solo) and deflected a pass in nine games and one start. He earned an overall grade of 44.2 from Pro Football Focus in 2017.

=== Oakland Raiders ===
On March 29, 2018, the Oakland Raiders signed Hall to a one-year, $1 million contract that includes a signing bonus of $45,000. He played in 10 games, starting four, before being placed on injured reserve on November 30, 2018 with a back injury.

== NFL career statistics ==
Year	Team	GP	Tackles				Fumbles			Interceptions					
Year	Team	GP	Cmb	Solo	Ast	Sck	FF	FR	Yds	Int	Yds	Avg	Lng	TD	PD
2007	CIN	16	68	54	14	0.0	1	0	0	5	16	3.2	12	0	12
2008	CIN	16	75	61	14	0.0	0	1	0	3	87	29.0	50	1	24
2009	CIN	16	71	58	13	0.0	2	0	0	6	47	7.8	26	0	24
2010	CIN	16	44	33	11	0.0	2	0	0	4	19	4.8	22	0	11
2011	CIN	9	32	29	3	0.0	0	1	10	2	15	7.5	15	0	7
2012	CIN	14	38	24	14	0.0	0	0	0	2	61	30.5	44	1	11
2013	CIN	5	20	14	6	0.0	0	0	0	1	0	0.0	0	0	5
2014	CIN	15	67	48	19	0.0	0	0	0	1	-3	-3.0	-3	0	8
2015	CIN	14	55	44	11	0.0	0	0	0	2	19	9.5	19	1	9
2016	NYG	12	31	21	10	2.0	1	0	0	1	29	29.0	29	0	2
2017	SF	9	16	15	1	0.0	0	0	0	0	0	0.0	0	0	1
2018	OAK	10	25	22	3	0.0	0	0	0	0	0	0.0	0	0	3
Career		142	542	423	119	2.0	6	2	10	27	290	10.7	50	3	117
