= Johnathan Joseph =

American football player (born 1984)

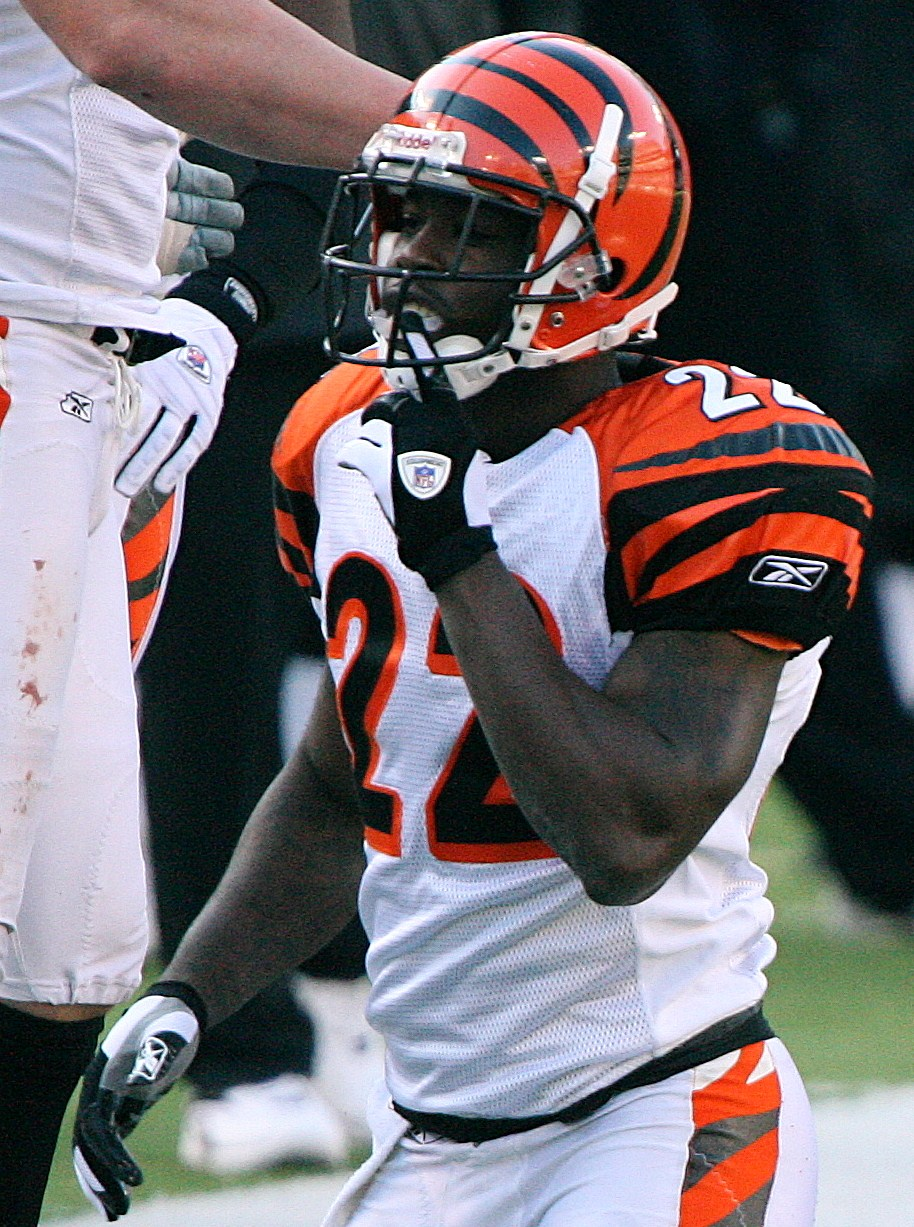
- Joseph with the Cincinnati Bengals in 2006

No. 22, 24, 33, 25
- Position: Cornerback

Personal information
- Born: April 16, 1984 (age 42); Rock Hill, South Carolina, U.S.
- Listed height: 5 ft 11 in (1.80 m)
- Listed weight: 186 lb (84 kg)

Career information
- High school: Northwestern (Rock Hill)
- College: Coffeyville (2003); South Carolina (2004–2005)
- NFL draft: 2006: 1st round, 24th overall pick

Career history
- Cincinnati Bengals (2006–2010); Houston Texans (2011–2019); Tennessee Titans (2020); Arizona Cardinals (2020)

Awards and highlights
- Second-team All-Pro (2011); 2× Pro Bowl (2011, 2012); Second-team All-SEC (2005)

Career NFL statistics
- Total tackles: 787
- Forced fumbles: 8
- Fumble recoveries: 6
- Interceptions: 32
- Pass deflections: 200
- Defensive touchdowns: 8
- Stats at Pro Football Reference

Johnathan Lee Joseph (born April 16, 1984) is an American former professional football player who was a cornerback in the National Football League (NFL). He played college football for the South Carolina Gamecocks and was selected by the Cincinnati Bengals in the first round of the 2006 NFL draft. Joseph also played for the Houston Texans, Tennessee Titans, and Arizona Cardinals.

== College career ==
Joseph began his college football career at Coffeyville Community College in Coffeyville, Kansas in 2003. He was ranked the 31st-best JUCO player in the nation by College Football News and earned all-conference honors. Joseph recorded three interceptions, one for a touchdown, and 43 tackles. He also recorded a sack and two pass breakups.

Joseph transferred to the University of South Carolina, where he played for South Carolina Gamecocks football team in 2004 and 2005. He started at cornerback his first two games of the 2004 season, recording two tackles in his first game against Vanderbilt and forcing a fumble. Joseph broke his foot in the first quarter against the Georgia Bulldogs, and spent the remainder of the year rehabilitating his injury.

Joseph was scheduled to have a big season in 2005, along with teammate Ko Simpson. He earned the Outstanding Defensive Back Award in spring practice and recorded two tackles and a broken up pass in the Garnet and Black Game. Joseph finished the season with 55 tackles, four interceptions, and nine broken up passes.

== Professional career ==
A year before the NFL draft, Joseph was not regarded as a highly touted prospect and wasn't on any big boards since he was still an underclassman and only had played two games at South Carolina. He began to improve his stock after playing well in 2005. Joseph was invited to the NFL Combine and after running a 4.31 40-yard dash, his draft stock immediately soared. Scouts and analysts projected him as a first or second round pick. Joseph was ranked the third-best cornerback by NFLDraftScout.com.

Pre-draft measurables
Height	Weight	Arm length	Hand span	40-yard dash	10-yard split	20-yard split	20-yard shuttle	Three-cone drill	Vertical jump	Broad jump	Bench press
5 ft 11 in (1.80 m)	193 lb (88 kg)	31 in (0.79 m)	9 5/8 in (0.24 m)	4.31 s	1.53 s	2.57 s	4.23 s	6.92 s	37.0 in (0.94 m)	10 ft 3 in (3.12 m)	15 reps
All values from NFL Combine

=== Cincinnati Bengals ===
The Cincinnati Bengals selected Joseph in the first round (24th overall) of the 2006 NFL draft. He was the third cornerback selected in the first round (15th Tye Hill, 19th Antonio Cromartie).

==== 2006 season ====
On July 31, 2006, the Bengals signed Joseph to a five-year, $8.10 million contract with $4.82 million guaranteed and a signing bonus of $1.09 million. He entered training camp competing with veteran Tory James and Deltha O'Neal for a starting cornerback position. Joseph was named the third cornerback on the depth chart behind O'Neal and James to begin the season and was named the nickelback.

Joseph earned the start over O'Neal in the season-opener against the Kansas City Chiefs and finished with three solo tackles in a 23–10 victory. On November 12, 2006, Joseph started his third game and made five solo tackles in a 31–16 victory over the New Orleans Saints. He started in place of Deltha O'Neal who suffered a shoulder injury the previous week and would miss the following three games. Joseph remained the starter the rest of the season. During a Week 13 matchup with the Baltimore Ravens, he recorded seven combined tackles and a season-high four pass deflections in a 13–7 victory. On December 31, 2006, Joseph made a season-high ten combined tackles and two pass deflections in a 23–17 loss to the Pittsburgh Steelers.

Joseph finished his rookie season with 58 combined tackles (45 solo) and 20 pass breakups in 16 games and nine starts.

==== 2007 season ====
With the departure of Tory James in free agency and Deltha O'Neal receiving shoulder surgery in the offseason, Joseph was slated to be the Bengals' starting cornerback. He faced competition for his starting position after the Bengals drafted cornerback Leon Hall with the 18th overall pick in the 2007 NFL draft. Joseph was named the starting right cornerback, opposite Deltha O'Neal, to begin the season. Hall and O'Neal were the starters for the season-opener against the Baltimore Ravens, but Joseph made two combined tackles in the 27–20 victory. The following week, he made his first start of the season and recorded three solo tackles in a 51–45 loss to the Cleveland Browns. On October 21, 2007, Joseph made five combined tackles and intercepted Chad Pennington for the first pick of his career. He returned it for a 42-yard touchdown and helped defeat New York Jets by a score of 38–31. On November 25, 2007, he recorded five combined tackles, three pass deflections, and intercepted Vince Young as the Bengals routed the Titans 35–6. The next game, Joseph made a season-high seven solo tackles and intercepted Ben Roethlisberger's pass during a 24–10 loss to the Pittsburgh Steelers. In Week 16, he made a season-high tying seven combined tackles and intercepted Cleveland Browns' quarterback Derek Anderson in a 19–14 victory. Joseph finished the 2007 season with 62 combined tackles (49 solo), 15 pass deflections, four interceptions, and a touchdown. He was second on the team with four interceptions, behind Leon Hall's five interceptions.

==== 2008 season ====
After Deltha O'Neal left during free agency, Leon Hall and Joseph became the Bengals' starting cornerbacks. He was named the left cornerback to begin the regular season.

Joseph started the season-opener against the Baltimore Ravens and made five combined tackles and three pass deflections, and recovered Ray Rice's fumble and returned it for a 65-yard touchdown in a 17–10 loss. He missed three games (Weeks 3–5) with an ankle injury and returned as a starter in Week 6, making three solo tackles and three pass deflections in a 26–14 loss to the New York Jets. On November 2, 2008, Joseph recorded a career-high 15 combined tackle (11 solo) and two pass deflections in a 21–19 win against the Jacksonville Jaguars. In the next game, he made five combined tackles and three pass deflections, and intercepted Donovan McNabb in a 13–13 tie with the Philadelphia Eagles. On November 21, 2008, Joseph was added to injured-reserve after a recurring foot injury. Joseph finished with 42 combined tackles (31 solo), 13 pass breakups, an interception, a forced fumble, a fumble recovery, and a touchdown in eight games and seven starts.

==== 2009 season ====
Joseph returned to his starting role in 2009 and combined with Leon Hall to become one of the better cornerback duos in the league.

On September 27, 2008, Joseph made six combined tackles and a pass deflection, and intercepted Ben Roethlisberger and returned it for a 30-yard touchdown, en route to a 22–19 victory against the Pittsburgh Steelers. The following game, he recorded two solo tackles, a pass deflection, and intercepted Derek Anderson in a 23–20 victory over the Cleveland Browns. During a Week 5 matchup with the Baltimore Ravens, Joseph had three solo tackles, a pass deflection, and intercepted Joe Flacco in a 17–14 victory. He had three consecutive games with an interception, which marked the longest streak of his career. On December 6, 2009, he made a season-high eight solo tackles and a pass deflection in a 23–13 defeat over the Detroit Lions. In Week 15, Joseph racked up six solo tackles and intercepted Matt Cassel for his sixth interception of the season, as the Bengals routed the Kansas City Chiefs 17–10. Joseph finished the season with 69 combined tackles (58 solo), 20 deflected passes, and a forced fumble in 16 games and starts. He also made a career-high six interceptions and returned one for a touchdown. He was ranked the sixth best cornerback by Pro Football Focus and posted a +14.5 in the measures.

The Bengals finished atop the AFC North with a 10–6 record. They faced the New York Jets in the AFC Wildcard game and Joseph made five combined tackles in the 24–14 loss. After the season, USA Today named Joseph to their annual "All-Joe" team which recognizes quality players that don't get their due. In December 2009, Sports Illustrated writer Peter King called Joseph and Hall "the best tandem in the NFL". Leon Hall and Joseph were named the Cincinnati Bengals' co-MVPS.

==== 2010 season ====
The Bengals entered the season with high expectations after ranking fourth in yards allowed in 2009. With the addition of Adam Jones, they entered with one of the most talented cornerback teams in the league. Hall and Joseph were ranked the third best cornerback tandem in 2009 by the AFC North Blog, behind Al Harris and Charles Woodson of the Green Bay Packers and Darrelle Revis and Lito Sheppard of the New York Jets.

Joseph started thee against the New England Patriots and made six solo tackles in a 38–24 loss. On October 10, 2010, he recorded two combined tackles and two pass deflections, and intercepted Josh Freeman in a 24–21 loss to the Tampa Bay Buccaneers. Joseph missed Weeks 7 and 8 with a sprained ankle and returned in Week 9 making four combined tackles in a 27–21 loss to the Pittsburgh Steelers. On November 21, 2010, he recorded two solo tackles and intercepted Ryan Fitzpatrick in a 49–31 loss to the Buffalo Bills.

Joseph finished the season with a career-lows 42 combined tackles (37 solo), eight pass deflections, three interceptions, and a touchdown in 12 games and starts. At the end of the season, he completed his rookie contract and became a free agent. Joseph entered negotiations with the Bengals and received two offers from them.

=== Houston Texans ===
On July 29, 2011, the Houston Texans signed Joseph to a five-year, $48.75 million contract with $23.50 million guaranteed and a signing bonus of $12.50 million. He and former Chicago Bears safety Danieal Manning were signed to help improve a defense that was ranked 30th overall and 32nd in pass defense the previous season.

==== 2011 season ====
Joseph entered the 2011 season as the Texans' de facto starting cornerback, opposite Kareem Jackson. Joseph started the season-opener and made five combined tackles in a 34–7 victory over the Indianapolis Colts. The following week, he recorded four solo tackles and three pass deflections, and intercepted Miami Dolphins' quarterback Chad Henne in a 23–13 victory. It was his first interception as a Texan. During Week 3 against the New Orleans Saints, Joseph racked up three solo tackles and two pass deflections, and intercepted Drew Brees in the 40–33 loss. On October 16, 2011, Joseph made a season-high seven combined tackles, a pass deflection, and intercepted Baltimore Ravens quarterback Joe Flacco in a 29–14 road loss.

Joseph finished his first season with the Texans with a total of four interceptions and 15 passes defended. He also registered 44 combined tackles (40 solo) and a forced fumble. On December 28, 2011, Joseph was invited to the 2012 Pro Bowl. and was named a second-team All-Pro by the Associated Press. On January 7, 2012, Joseph made six solo tackles and intercepted Andy Dalton in a 31–10 victory over his former team, the Cincinnati Bengals. marking the Texans first ever playoff victory. During the AFC Divisional Round, the Texans were defeated by the Ravens. Joseph made two solo tackles in the game. On January 29, 2012, he appeared in his first career Pro Bowl and intercepted Cam Newton, as the AFC defeated the NFC, 59–41.

==== 2012 season ====
On May 9, 2012, Joseph was announced as the 73rd-ranked player on the NFL Top 100.

Joseph started in the 30–10 victory over the Miami Dolphins with five combined tackles and a pass deflection, and intercepted Ryan Tannehill. On October 14, 2012, he made seven total tackles in a 42–24 loss to the Green Bay Packers. The following week, Joseph made five combined tackles and a pass deflection, and intercepted Joe Flacco and returned it for a 52-yard touchdown in a 43–13 win over the Baltimore Ravens. Joseph missed Weeks 11 and 12 due to a groin injury.

Joseph finished the season with 57 total tackles (52 solo), 11 pass deflections, two interceptions, and touchdown in 14 games and starts. He was selected to his second Pro Bowl along with eight of his Texans teammates.

==== 2013 season ====
During the offseason, Joseph had surgery to repair two sports hernias he had endured through the year before and attributed the defensive passing game falling to 16th in 2012 to multiple hamstring, groin, and hernia injuries. He entered training camp at 100%.

Joseph started against the San Diego Chargers and made two solo tackles and two pass deflections in a 31–28 victory. In Week 3, he made two solo tackles, three pass deflections, and intercepted Russell Wilson for his first pick of the season in a 23–20 loss to the Seattle Seahawks. On December 13, 2013, Joseph made a season-high nine combined tackles, a pass deflection, and intercepted Andrew Luck in a 25–3 loss to the Indianapolis Colts. Joseph had a surgery in December to repair a torn ligament in his toe.

Joseph finished the season with a combined 47 tackles (43 solo), 16 pass deflections, and three interceptions in 15 games and starts. The Texans finished the season with a 2–14 record and head coach Gary Kubiak was fired after Week 15. Football Outsiders ranked him fifth among qualified corners with a 63% success rate.

==== 2014 season ====
Joseph returned to his starting role, along with Kareem Jackson, under new head coach Bill O'Brien to begin 2014. In the season-opener, Joseph made 11 solo tackles in a 17–6 victory over the Washington Redskins. On November 23, 2014, he made three combined tackles, a pass deflection, and returned an interception for a 60-yard touchdown in a 22–13 loss to the Cincinnati Bengals. Joseph finished the season with a career-high 75 combined tackles (70 solo), 11 pass deflections, two forced fumbles, two interceptions, and a touchdown in 16 games and starts. Joseph's rank fell to 30th in Football Outsiders success rate. Pro Football Focus ranked him the 20th-best coverman in 2014.

==== 2015 season ====
Joseph entered training camp facing competition from Kevin Johnson who was selected with the 16th overall pick in the 2015 NFL draft and A. J. Bouye. Kareem Jackson and Joseph were able to maintain their starting roles to begin the season.

On June 18, 2015, the Texans signed him to a two-year, $13.50 million contract with $11.50 million guaranteed.

Joseph started the season-opener against the Kansas City Chiefs and made four solo tackles and a pass deflection in a 27–20 loss. On November 16, 2015, Joseph made four solo tackles, a pass deflection, and intercepted Andy Dalton in a 10–6 victory over the Cincinnati Bengals. In Week 12, he made a season-high seven combined tackles in, as the Texans routed the New Orleans Saints 24–6. The Texans finished atop the AFC South with a 9–7 record. Joseph started the AFC Wildcard game and made two combined tackles as the Texans were defeated by the Kansas City Chiefs by a score of 30–0. He finished the season with 56 combined tackles (46 solo), 22 pass deflections, and a touchdown in 16 games and starts. Football Outsiders ranked him 31st with a 54% success rate.

==== 2016 season ====
Joseph started the first game against the Chicago Bears and made four combined tackles and a pass deflection in a 23–14 victory. On November 13, 2016, Joseph recorded a season-high eight solo tackles and a pass deflection during a 24–21 victory over the Jacksonville Jaguars. During Week 13 against the Green Bay Packers, he made four solo tackles but left in the third quarter of the 21–13 loss, due to a rib injury. Joseph missed the next two games with two cracked ribs and a bruised lung.

Joseph finishing the season with 45 combined tackles (38 solo), nine pass deflections, and posted his first season in his career without an interception in 13 games and 11 starts. The Texans finished atop the AFC South with a 9–7 record. On January 7, 2017, Joseph made ten solo tackles and three pass deflections in a 27–14 AFC Wildcard victory over the Oakland Raiders.

==== 2017 season ====
In Week 5, Joseph collected a season-high six combined tackles in a 42–34 loss to the Kansas City Chiefs. In the next game, he recorded three combined tackles, a season-high three pass deflections, two interceptions, and a touchdown during a 33–17 victory against the Cleveland Browns. Joseph returned an interception by Kevin Hogan, that was intended for Duke Johnson, for an 82-yard touchdown in the second quarter. His performance in Week 6 earned him AFC Defensive Player of the Week. Joseph finished the 2017 season with 47 combined tackles (37 solo), nine pass deflections, two interceptions, and a touchdown in 16 games and starts. Pro Football Focus gave him an overall grade of 75.7, which ranked 65th among all qualifying cornerbacks in 2017.

==== 2018 season ====
On March 15, 2018, the Texans signed Joseph to a two-year, $10 million contract with $3.90 million guaranteed.

During Week 6 against the Buffalo Bills, Joseph intercepted Nathan Peterman late in the fourth quarter and returned it for a 28-yard touchdown to win the game 20–13.

==== 2019 season ====
In the 2019 season, Joseph recorded 51 tackles, 13 pass deflections, and an interception in 14 games and 11 starts.

On March 18, 2020, Joseph and the Texans mutually agreed to part ways, making him a free agent.

=== Tennessee Titans ===
On May 6, 2020, Joseph signed with the Tennessee Titans.

During Week 3 against the Minnesota Vikings, Joseph recorded his first interception and forced fumble as a Titan in the narrow 31–30 road victory. During a Week 8 31–20 road loss to the Cincinnati Bengals, he gave up eight completions for 92 yards and a touchdown. Joseph was released on November 3.

=== Arizona Cardinals ===
On November 11, 2020, Joseph was signed by the Arizona Cardinals. He made his Cardinals debut during a narrow Week 10 32–30 victory over the Buffalo Bills. Joseph was placed on injured reserve on December 12.

=== Retirement ===
On June 10, 2021, Joseph announced his retirement after 15 seasons in the NFL.

== NFL career statistics ==
Legend
	Led the league
**Bold**	Career high

=== Regular season ===
Year	Team	Games		Tackles				Fumbles				Interceptions					
Year	Team	GP	GS	Comb	Solo	Ast	Sack	FF	FR	Yds	TD	Int	Yds	Avg	Lng	TD	PD
2006	CIN	16	9	57	45	12	0.0	1	**2**	7	0	0	0	0.0	0	0	20
2007	CIN	15	14	62	49	**13**	0.0	0	0	0	0	4	76	19.0	42T	**1**	15
2008	CIN	8	7	42	31	11	0.0	1	1	65	**1**	1	22	22.0	22	0	13
2009	CIN	16	16	70	59	11	0.0	0	0	0	0	**6**	**92**	15.3	32	**1**	20
2010	CIN	12	12	42	37	5	0.0	0	0	0	0	3	38	12.7	21T	**1**	8
2011	HOU	15	15	44	40	4	0.0	1	0	0	0	4	40	10.0	29	0	15
2012	HOU	14	14	57	52	5	0.0	0	0	0	0	2	88	**44.0**	52T	**1**	10
2013	HOU	15	15	47	44	3	0.0	0	0	0	0	3	64	21.3	32	0	16
2014	HOU	16	16	**75**	**70**	5	0.0	**2**	**2**	**73**	0	2	85	42.5	60T	**1**	11
2015	HOU	16	16	58	48	10	0.0	1	1	0	0	1	2	2.0	2	0	**22**
2016	HOU	13	11	45	38	7	0.0	1	0	0	0	0	0	0.0	0	0	9
2017	HOU	16	16	47	37	10	0.0	0	0	0	0	2	85	42.5	**82T**	**1**	9
2018	HOU	14	14	58	49	9	0.0	0	0	0	0	2	46	23.0	28T	**1**	13
2019	HOU	14	11	51	43	8	0.0	0	0	0	0	1	0	0.0	0	0	13
2020	TEN	7	6	29	25	4	0.0	1	0	0	0	1	5	5.0	0	0	5
2020	ARI	4	0	3	3	0	0.0	0	0	0	0	0	0	0.0	0	0	1
Career		211	192	787	670	117	0.0	8	6	145	1	32	643	20.1	82T	7	200

=== Postseason ===
Year	Team	Games		Tackles				Fumbles				Interceptions					
Year	Team	GP	GS	Comb	Solo	Ast	Sack	FF	FR	Yds	TD	Int	Yds	Avg	Lng	TD	PD
2009	CIN	1	1	3	2	1	0.0	0	0	0	0	0	0	0.0	0	0	0
2011	HOU	2	2	8	8	0	0.0	0	0	0	0	**1**	-1	-1.0	-1	0	**5**
2012	HOU	2	2	10	8	**2**	0.0	0	0	0	0	**1**	**14**	**14.0**	**14**	0	2
2015	HOU	1	1	2	1	1	0.0	0	0	0	0	0	0	0.0	0	0	0
2016	HOU	2	2	**14**	**14**	0	0.0	0	0	0	0	0	0	0.0	0	0	3
2018	HOU	1	1	6	4	**2**	0.0	0	0	0	0	0	0	0.0	0	0	0
2019	HOU	1	0	0	0	0	0.0	0	0	0	0	0	0	0.0	0	0	0
Career		10	9	43	37	6	0.0	0	0	0	0	2	13	6.5	14	0	10

== Personal life ==
Joseph was a criminal justice major at the University of South Carolina. He and his wife, Delaina, reside in Houston, Texas. Joseph has three children: Jay’vion, Johnathan II, and Danae. He is of Haitian descent.

Joseph's father, John, worked at a cotton mill for over 30 years and died in 2014 at age 76 after having emphysema that developed into lung cancer from being a smoker. Joseph credits his father for molding him into the man he is today and instilling core values. He always practices yoga and Pilates to help his body deal better with age.
