= Lionel Gates =

American football player (born 1982)

No. 36
- Position: Running back

Personal information
- Born: March 13, 1982 (age 44); Jacksonville, Florida, U.S.
- Listed height: 6 ft 0 in (1.83 m)
- Listed weight: 223 lb (101 kg)

Career information
- High school: Parker (Jacksonville)
- College: Louisville
- NFL draft: 2005: 7th round, 236th overall pick

Career history
- Buffalo Bills (2005); Tampa Bay Buccaneers (2006–2007)
- Stats at Pro Football Reference

Lionel Theron Gates (born March 13, 1982) is an American former professional football player who was a running back in the National Football League (NFL). He was selected by the Buffalo Bills in the seventh round of the 2005 NFL draft with the 236th overall pick. He played college football for the Louisville Cardinals.

== Early life ==
Gates attended Terry Parker High School (Jacksonville, Florida) and was awarded four varsity letters each in football and track. In football, he was chosen twice for the All-Northeast Florida team and was named one of the top Senior Football Players in the state of Florida by FOX.com.

== College career ==
Gates attended University of Louisville, where he split carries with Eric Shelton (Panthers) and finished his college career with 310 rushing attempts for 1,475 yards (4.8 yards per rushing attempt average) and 20 rushing touchdowns, 40 receptions for 469 yards (11.7 yards per receiving average) and 2 receiving touchdowns, and 6 kickoff returns for 92 yards (15.33 yards per kick return average).
