= Patrick Body =

American football player (born 1982)

No. 41
- Position: Cornerback/Safety

Personal information
- Born: January 17, 1982 (age 44); Pittsburgh, Pennsylvania, U.S.
- Listed height: 6 ft 2 in (1.88 m)
- Listed weight: 198 lb (90 kg)

Career information
- High school: Schenley (Pittsburgh)
- College: Toledo
- NFL draft: 2005: undrafted

Career history
- Cincinnati Bengals (2005); Minnesota Vikings (2006–2007)*; Detroit Lions (2007); Winnipeg Blue Bombers (2009)*; Utah Blaze (2010)
- * Offseason or practice squad member only

Career NFL statistics
- Total tackles: 4
- Stats at Pro Football Reference

Patrick Body (born January 17, 1982) is an American former professional football player who was a cornerback and safety in the National Football League (NFL). He was signed by the Cincinnati Bengals as an undrafted free agent in 2005. He played college football for the Toledo Rockets.

Body was also a member of the Minnesota Vikings, Detroit Lions and Winnipeg Blue Bombers. He has one son, Patrick Body Jr, who attends Gateway High School. Patrick Body Jr is a 3 Star DB in the class of 2022 who holds multiple division 1 offers.

== Early life ==
Body attended Schenley High School and was a student and a letterman in football. In football, he played wide receiver and defensive back and as a senior, he led his team to the first City Championship in 49 years and was an All-City League selection and an All-City League Academic selection.

== Professional career ==
On February 15, 2010, Body was assigned to the Utah Blaze of the Arena Football League.
