= 2005 All-Pro Team =

Official list of the best NFL players in 2005

The 2005 All-Pro Team was composed of the National Football League players that were named to the Associated Press, Pro Football Writers Association, and The Sporting News All-Pro Teams in 2005. Both first and second teams are listed for the AP team. These are the three teams that are included in Total Football II: The Official Encyclopedia of the National Football League. In 2005 the Pro Football Writers Association and Pro Football Weekly combined their All-pro teams, a practice which continued through 2008.

== Teams ==
Offense
Position	First team	Second team
Quarterback	Peyton Manning, Indianapolis Colts (AP, PFWA, TSN)	Tom Brady, New England Patriots (AP-2)
Running back	Tiki Barber, New York Giants (AP, PFWA); Shaun Alexander, Seattle Seahawks (AP, PFWA, TSN); LaDainian Tomlinson, San Diego Chargers (TSN)	Larry Johnson, Kansas City Chiefs (AP-2); LaDainian Tomlinson, San Diego Chargers (AP-2)
Fullback	Mack Strong, Seattle Seahawks (AP)	Lorenzo Neal, San Diego Chargers (AP-2)
Wide receiver	Chad Johnson, Cincinnati Bengals (AP, PFWA, TSN); Steve Smith, Carolina Panthers (AP, PFWA, TSN)	Santana Moss, Washington Redskins (AP-2); Marvin Harrison, Indianapolis Colts (AP-2)
Tight end	Antonio Gates, San Diego Chargers (AP, PFWA, TSN)	none
Tackle	Walter Jones, Seattle Seahawks (AP, PFWA, TSN); Willie Anderson, Cincinnati Bengals (AP, PFWA); Willie Roaf, Kansas City Chiefs (TSN)	Willie Roaf, Kansas City Chiefs (AP-2); Jon Jansen, Washington Redskins (AP-2)
Guard	Alan Faneca, Pittsburgh Steelers (AP, PFWA, TSN); Brian Waters, Kansas City Chiefs (AP-t); Steve Hutchinson, Seattle Seahawks (AP-t, PFWA, TSN)	Will Shields, Kansas City Chiefs (AP-2)
Center	Jeff Saturday, Indianapolis Colts (AP); Olin Kreutz, Chicago Bears (PFWA, TSN)	Olin Kreutz, Chicago Bears (AP-2)

Special teams
Position	First team	Second team
Kicker	Neil Rackers, Arizona Cardinals (AP, PFWA, TSN)	Shayne Graham, Cincinnati Bengals (AP-2)
Punter	Brian Moorman, Buffalo Bills (AP, PFWA, TSN)	Josh Bidwell, Tampa Bay Buccaneers (AP-2)
Kick Returner	Jerome Mathis, Houston Texans (AP, PFWA, TSN)	Terrence McGee, Buffalo Bills (AP-2)
Punt Returner	Antwaan Randle El, Pittsburgh Steelers (PFWA); B. J. Sams, Baltimore Ravens (TSN)	
Special Teams	David Tyree, New York Giants (PFWA)	

Defense
Position	First team	Second team
Defensive end	Osi Umenyiora, New York Giants (AP, PFWA); Dwight Freeney, Indianapolis Colt (AP, PFWA, TSN); Michael Strahan, New York Giants (TSN)	Derrick Burgess, Oakland Raiders (AP-2); Michael Strahan, New York Giants (AP-2)
Defensive tackle	Richard Seymour, New England Patriots (AP, PFWA); Jamal Williams, San Diego Chargers (AP, TSN); Rod Coleman, Atlanta Falcons (PFWA); Marcus Stroud, Jacksonville Jaguars (TSN)	Rod Coleman, Atlanta Falcons (AP-2); Tommie Harris, Chicago Bears (AP-2)
Inside linebacker	Brian Urlacher, Chicago Bears (AP, PFWA, TSN); Al Wilson, Denver Broncos (AP, TSN)	Zach Thomas, Miami Dolphins (AP-2); Mike Peterson, Jacksonville Jaguars (AP-2)
Outside linebacker	Lance Briggs, Chicago Bears (AP, PFWA); Derrick Brooks, Tampa Bay Buccaneers (AP); Cato June, Indianapolis Colts (PFWA); Shawne Merriman, San Diego Chargers (TSN)	Joey Porter, Pittsburgh Steelers (AP-2); Cato June, Indianapolis Colts (AP-2)
Cornerback	Champ Bailey, Denver Broncos (AP, PFWA, TSN); Ronde Barber, Tampa Bay Buccaneers (AP); Nathan Vasher, Chicago Bears (PFWA); Deltha O'Neal, Cincinnati Bengals (TSN)	Nathan Vasher, Chicago Bears (AP-2); Deltha O'Neal, Cincinnati Bengals (AP-2)
Safety	Bob Sanders, Indianapolis Colts (AP); Troy Polamalu, Pittsburgh Steelers (AP, PFWA, TSN); Darren Sharper, Minnesota Vikings (PFWA, TSN)	Darren Sharper, Minnesota Vikings (AP-2); Mike Brown, Chicago Bears (AP-2)

== Key ==
- AP = Associated Press first-team All-Pro
- AP-2 = Associated Press second-team All-Pro
- PFWA = Pro Football Writers Association All-NFL
- TSN = The Sporting News All-Pro
