= Deltha O'Neal =

American football player (born 1977)

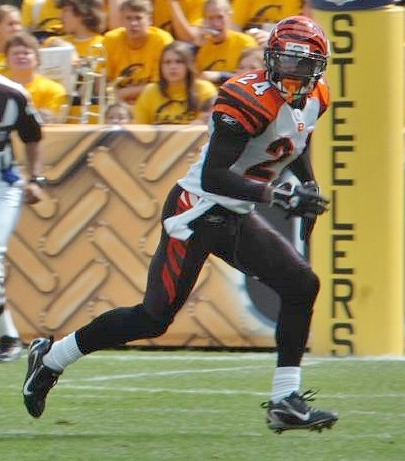
- O'Neal with the Cincinnati Bengals in 2006

No. 24, 21
- Position: Cornerback

Personal information
- Born: January 30, 1977 (age 49); Palo Alto, California, U.S.
- Listed height: 5 ft 11 in (1.80 m)
- Listed weight: 194 lb (88 kg)

Career information
- High school: Milpitas (Milpitas, California)
- College: California (1996–1999)
- NFL draft: 2000: 1st round, 15th overall pick

Career history
- Denver Broncos (2000–2003); Cincinnati Bengals (2004–2007); New England Patriots (2008); Houston Texans (2009)*
- * Offseason or practice squad member only

Awards and highlights
- Second-team All-Pro (2005); 2× Pro Bowl (2001, 2005); NFL interceptions co-leader (2005); Consensus All-American (1999); Pac-10 Defensive Player of the Year (1999); Mosi Tatupu Award (1999); Pop Warner Trophy (1999); First-team All-Pac-10 (1999); NFL record: Most passes intercepted in a single game: 4 (tied)

Career NFL statistics
- Total tackles: 388
- Forced fumbles: 3
- Fumble recoveries: 4
- Interceptions: 34
- Total return yards: 2,644
- Total touchdowns: 6
- Stats at Pro Football Reference

Deltha Lee O'Neal, III (born January 30, 1977) is an American former professional football player who was a cornerback for nine seasons in the National Football League (NFL). He played college football for the California Golden Bears, and was recognized as a consensus All-American. He was selected by the Denver Broncos as the 15th pick overall in the 2000 NFL draft, and also played for the Cincinnati Bengals, and New England Patriots. He was a two-time Pro Bowl selection.

== Early life ==
O'Neal was born in Palo Alto, California. He is a 1995 graduate of Milpitas High School in Milpitas, California, where he was a running back, cornerback, and kick returner for the Milpitas high school football team. In track & field, he was a state-qualifier in the 100 and 200-meters, with personal-bests of 10.75 in the 100 and 21.66 in the 200. He was also a member of the 4 × 100 m (41.65s) relay squad.

== College career ==
He attended the University of California, Berkeley, and played for the California Golden Bears football team. In his senior year with the Golden Bears, O'Neal set the NCAA single-season record of four interceptions returned for touchdowns and was recognized as a consensus first-team All-American. He graduated from California with a degree in social welfare in 2000.

== Professional career ==
Pre-draft measurables
Height	Weight
5 ft 11 in (1.80 m)	193 lb (88 kg)
Values from NFL Combine

=== Denver Broncos ===
The Denver Broncos selected O'Neal in the first round (15th overall) of the 2000 NFL draft. He was the first cornerback selected in 2000 and was only the second cornerback drafted in the first round of the NFL draft by the Broncos, joining Louis Wright (1975).

On April 25, 2000, the Broncos' No. 1 starting cornerback Dale Carter was notified he will be suspended for the entire 2000 NFL season after violating the NFL Substance Abuse Policy.

==== 2000 season ====
On July 21, 2000, the Denver Broncos signed O'Neal to a five—year, $6.96 million rookie contract that includes a signing bonus of $4.55 million.

He entered training camp as a possible candidate to take over the role as the No. 1 starting cornerback, but had to compete with Terrell Buckley, Darryl Pounds, and Jimmy Spencer. Head coach Mike Shanahan named O'Neal a backup cornerback and listed him as the third cornerback on the depth chart to start the regular season, behind starting tandem Ray Crockett and Terrell Buckley.

On September 4, 2000, O'Neal made his professional regular season debut in the Denver Broncos' season-opener at the St. Louis Rams and recorded two solo tackles as they lost 36—41. In Week 13, he made two solo tackles, set a season-high with two pass deflections, and forced a fumble during a 38—31 victory at the Seattle Seahawks. He finished his rookie season with eight solo tackles, three pass deflections, three forced fumbles, and a fumble recovery in 16 games and zero starts.

==== 2001 season ====
On January 16, 2001, the Denver Broncos hired Ray Rhodes to be their new defensive coordinator, replacing Greg Robinson. Throughout training camp, O'Neal competed against Denard Walker, Eric Davis, Tyrone Poole, and rookie first round pick (24th overall) Willie Middlebrooks to earn a starting role at cornerback following the departures of Terrell Buckley and Ray Crockett. Head coach Mike Shanahan named O'Neal the No. 1 starting cornerback to begin the regular season, along with Denard Walker.

On October 7, 2001, O'Neal recorded three solo tackles, made six pass deflections, and set a career-high and tied a single game record with four interceptions on pass attempts by Trent Green during a 6—20 victory against the Kansas City Chiefs. In Week 7, O'Neal made five solo tackles, four pass deflections, and intercepted two passes thrown by Tom Brady as the Broncos defeated the New England Patriots 20—31. The following week, he set a season-high with eight solo tackles during a 28—38 loss at the Oakland Raiders in Week 9. On December 30, 2001, O'Neal made six combined tackles (five solo), a pass break-up, and made a key interception on a pass Rich Gannon to wide receiver James Jett late in the fourth quarter as the Broncos defeated the Oakland Raiders 23—17. On January 6, 2002, O'Neal made three combined tackles (two solo), two pass deflections, and set a career-high with nine interceptions after picking off Peyton Manning's pass attempt to wide receiver Marvin Harrison during a 10—29 loss at the Indianapolis Colts. He started all 16 games and finished with 69 combined tackles (62 solo), 25 pass deflections, and nine interceptions.

==== 2002 season ====
He returned as the No. 1 starting cornerback alongside Denard Walker for the 2002 NFL season. In Week 2, O'Neal recorded five combined tackles (four solo), made one pass break-up, and sealed a 24—14 victory against the San Francisco 49ers by intercepting a pass Jeff Garcia threw to wide receiver Tai Streets late in the fourth quarter. The following week, he set a season-high with nine solo tackles during a 28—23 victory against the Buffalo Bills in Week 3. On October 6, 2002, O'Neal made seven combined tackles (six solo), two pass break-ups, set a season-high with two interceptions, and returned one of them for a touchdown to mark the first of his career as the Broncos routed the San Diego Chargers 26—9. He scored on a pick-six in the fourth quarter after intercepting a pass Drew Brees threw to wide receiver Tim Dwight and returning it 28—yards for the first touchdown of his career. On November 17, 2002, O'Neal made four combined tackles (three solo), two pass break-ups, and intercepted a pass Matt Hasselbeck attempted to throw to fullback Mack Strong 22—yards to score a touchdown during a 31—9 victory at the Seattle Seahawks. He started all 16 games for the second consecutive season and made 69 combined tackles (59 solo), nine pass deflections, five interceptions, two touchdowns, and one fumble recovery.

==== 2003 season ====
On January 11, 2003, the Denver Broncos announced their decision to fire defensive coordinator Ray Rhodes after a disappointing 2002 NFL season where they finished with a 9—7 record. Linebackers coach Larry Coyer was promoted to in his place. Entering training camp, O'Neal was slated to return as a starting cornerback. Head coach Mike Shanahan named O'Neal and Lenny Walls the starting cornerbacks to begin the season.

In Week 2, he set a season-high with eight combined tackles (seven solo) as the Broncos won 37—13 at the San Diego Chargers. Following a 23—24 loss at the Kansas City Chiefs in Week 5, head coach Mike Shanahan demoted O'Neal after he struggled in the beginning of the season and was held responsible for allowing five touchdown receptions. He would be designated as a backup for the rest of the season and was supplanted on the depth chart by Kelly Herndon. On November 3, 2003, O'Neal recorded two solo tackles and returned a punt by Ken Walter for a 57—yard touchdown during a 26—30 loss to the New England Patriots. Following Week 8, O'Neal was demoted after he was surpassed on the depth chart by Willie Middlebrooks. Head coach Marvin Lewis experimented with O'Neal playing wide receiver in two games (Weeks 12—13), but ended the experiment after he caught two receptions for four—yards. He finished his last season with the Broncos with a total of 31 combined tackles (23 solo), two pass deflections, one forced fumble, and a single interception in 13 games and six starts.

=== Cincinnati Bengals ===
==== 2004 season ====
On April 8, 2004, the Denver Broncos traded O'Neal, along with their first (24th overall) and fourth-round selections (117th overall) in the 2004 NFL draft to the Cincinnati Bengals in return for their 2004 first-round selection (17th overall). On the same day, the Cincinnati Bengals signed O'Neal to a five—year, $8.52 million contract extension that included a signing bonus of $2.00 million. The contract added four years to the final year of his rookie contract and was restructured into a five—year deal that will keep him under contract throughout 2009.

Entering training camp, he was slated to be a starter at cornerback following the departures of Jeff Burris and Artrell Hawkins via free agency. Head coach Marvin Lewis named O'Neal the No. 2 starting cornerback to begin the season, alongside Tory James. O'Neal missed the end of the preseason and remained inactive for the Bengals' 24—31 loss at the New York Jets in their season-opener due to an ankle injury.

On October 25, 2004, O'Neal made four combined tackles (three solo), two pass break-ups, and made his first interception as a member of the Bengals on a pass Jake Plummer attempted to throw to wide receiver Ashley Lelie during a 10—23 win against his former team, the Denver Broncos. The following game, he set a season-high with seven combined tackles (six solo) and made two pass deflections during a 20—27 loss at the Tennessee Titans in Week 8. On November 28, 2004, O'Neal made four combined tackles (three solo), one pass deflection, and intercepted a pass Kelly Holcomb threw to tight end Aaron Shea and returned it 31—yards to score a touchdown to seal a 48—58 victory against the Cleveland Browns late in the fourth quarter. In Week 13, he recorded three solo tackles and had his first career sack on Kyle Boller for an eight—yard loss during a 27—26 victory at the Baltimore Ravens. O'Neal left the game shortly due to an ankle injury and would be sidelined for the next two games (Weeks 14—15). He finished the season with 40 combined tackles (35 solo), 15 pass deflections, four interceptions, and one touchdown in 13 games and 10 starts.

==== 2005 season ====
The Cincinnati Bengals elected not to re-sign defensive coordinator Leslie Frazier and subsequently promoted Chuck Bresnahan to takeover as his replacement. Head coach Marvin Lewis named O'Neal and Tory James as the starting cornerbacks to begin the season.

On September 18, 2005, O'Neal had one of his best statistical performances of his career, recording nine combined tackles (seven solo), set a season-high with five pass break-ups, and set another season-high with three interceptions on passes thrown by Daunte Culpepper as the Bengals routed the Minnesota Vikings 8—37. On October 30, 2005, he made five combined tackles (four solo), three pass deflections, and intercepted two pass attempts thrown by Brett Favre during a 21—14 win against the Green Bay Packers. In Week 15, O'Neal made four solo tackles, two pass deflections, and set a new career-high with his tenth interception of the season after picking off Jeff Garcia during a 41—17 win at the Detroit Lions. His tenth interception broke the Cincinnati Bengals' franchise record, surpassing Ken Riley in 1976. He was inactive as the Bengals lost 3—37 at the Kansas City Chiefs in Week 17 due to a knee injury. He finished with 65 combined tackles (56 solo), 20 pass deflections, 10 interceptions, and made one fumble recovery in 15 games and 14 starts. His performance throughout the 2005 NFL season earned him a selection to the 2006 Pro Bowl, marking the second Pro Bowl selection of his career. He tied for the most interceptions that season with Ty Law of the New York Jets.

==== 2006 season ====
Throughout training camp, O'Neal competed against Tory James and rookie first round pick (24th overall) Johnathan Joseph to retain his starting role at cornerback as he recovered from undergoing knee surgery during the off-season. Head coach Marvin Lewis retained O'Neal and Tory James as the starting cornerbacks to begin the season with rookie Johnathan Joseph at nickelback.

In early December 2006, O'Neal was arrested on DWI charges.

==== 2007 season ====
In the 2007 season, O'Neal recorded 52 tackles and one interception.

==== 2008 season ====
On August 30, 2008, the Cincinnati Bengals officially released O'Neal as part of their final roster cuts.

=== New England Patriots ===
On September 1, 2008, the New England Patriots signed O'Neal to a one—year, $1 million contract as an unrestricted free agenct.

=== Houston Texans ===
O'Neal signed with the Houston Texans on August 6, 2009, following an injury to cornerback Jacques Reeves. He was released on September 5, 2009.

== NFL career statistics ==
Year	Team	GP	Tackles				Fumbles		Interceptions						Punt returns					Kickoff returns			
Year	Team	GP	Cmb	Solo	Ast	Sck	FF	FR	Int	Yds	Avg	Lng	TD	PD	Ret	Yds	Lng	TD	FC	Ret	Yds	Lng	TD
2000	DEN	16	2	2	0	0.0	1	1	0	0	0.0	0	0	3	34	354	64	0	11	46	1,102	87	1
2001	DEN	16	69	62	7	0.0	0	0	9	115	12.8	42	0	25	31	405	86	1	9	0	0	0	0
2002	DEN	16	69	59	10	0.0	0	0	5	70	14.0	28	2	9	30	251	53	0	7	1	15	15	0
2003	DEN	13	23	20	3	0.0	0	0	1	6	6.0	6	0	2	33	315	57	1	10	8	128	24	0
2004	CIN	12	39	34	5	1.0	1	0	4	60	15.0	31	1	15	7	33	17	0	6	1	15	15	0
2005	CIN	15	65	56	9	0.0	0	1	10	103	10.3	37	0	18	0	0	0	0	0	1	14	14	0
2006	CIN	12	37	30	7	0.0	0	1	1	42	42.0	42	0	9	1	10	10	0	2	0	0	0	0
2007	CIN	16	52	48	4	0.0	1	1	1	7	7.0	7	0	9	—	—	—	—	—	—	—	—	—
2008	NE	16	32	30	2	0.0	0	0	3	49	16.3	47	0	8	2	2	2	0	1	0	0	0	0
Career		132	388	341	47	1.0	3	4	34	452	13.3	47	3	98	138	1,370	86	2	46	57	1,274	87	1

== Legal issues ==
On December 9, 2006, O'Neal was arrested in the Pierce Twp community of Cincinnati after he was pulled over for driving while intoxicated. O'Neal was driving a black Cadillac Escalade. He was one of 9 Bengals players arrested during the 2006 offseason and regular season.

In December 2019, O'Neal was charged with one count of DUI with serious injury and one of DUI with property damage in Royal Palm Beach, Florida after speeding 100 mph in his Mercedes Benz and striking a utility pole, causing the vehicle to catch fire on August 7, 2019. He and a passenger were airlifted to St. Mary's Medical Center, where O'Neal suffered a broken ankle, a fractured back and neck, an eye injury, brain bleeding and intestinal injuries.
