= Brad Cieslak =

American football player (born 1982)

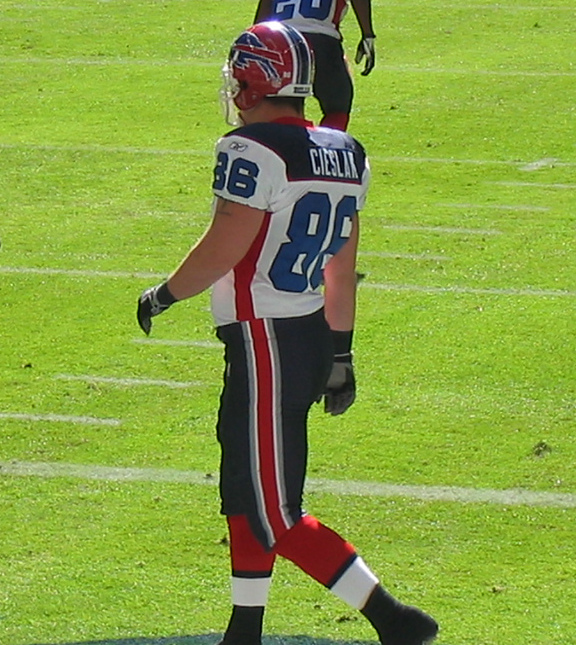
- Cieslak in 2006

No. 48, 86, 88
- Position: Tight end

Personal information
- Born: July 1, 1982 (age 44); Long Grove, Illinois, U.S.
- Listed height: 6 ft 3 in (1.91 m)
- Listed weight: 252 lb (114 kg)

Career information
- High school: Adlai E. Stevenson (Lincolnshire, Illinois)
- College: Northern Illinois
- NFL draft: 2005: undrafted

Career history
- Buffalo Bills (2005–2007); Cleveland Browns (2007–2008)

Awards and highlights
- First-team All-MAC (2004)

Career NFL statistics
- Receptions: 6
- Receiving yards: 46
- Stats at Pro Football Reference

Bradley Ryan Cieslak (/ˈsɪslæk/; born July 1, 1982) is an American former professional football player who was a tight end in the National Football League (NFL). He played college football for the Northern Illinois Huskies before being signed by the Buffalo Bills as an undrafted free agent in 2005.

== Early life ==
Cieslak played quarterback, linebacker and punter at Lincolnshire's Stevenson High School. He also played baseball and basketball. Bradley did not have the chance to start his Jr year at Stevenson as he was back up to All Conference Branko Vajda class of 99. Vajda quit football after high school to pursue his career in civil engineering while Cieslak continued living out his dream of playing in the NFL.

== College career ==
Cieslak played college football at Northern Illinois University. During his time with the Huskies, he made 47 receptions totaling 531 yards and five touchdowns.

== Professional career ==
=== Buffalo Bills ===
Cieslak joined the Buffalo Bills as an undrafted free agent. He spent most of his rookie season on the practice squad but was signed to the active roster on December 22. He made his NFL debut at the Cincinnati Bengals on December 24.

Like in 2005, he was signed initially to the practice squad where he spent the majority of the season. He was elevated to the active roster on November 17 and played in seven games with six receptions for 46 yards. He only appeared in two games for the Bills and was waived on December 6.

=== Cleveland Browns ===
He was signed by the Cleveland Browns to the practice squad on December 12. He was re-signed in the 2008 offseason but was waived during final cuts on August 30.

Cieslak was re-signed by the Browns on December 23, 2008, after running back Jason Wright was placed on injured reserve. Cieslak was not re-signed after the 2008 season.
