= Tab Perry =

American football player (born 1982)

No. 88, 13
- Position: Wide receiver

Personal information
- Born: January 20, 1982 (age 44); Wilkes-Barre, Pennsylvania, U.S.
- Listed height: 6 ft 3 in (1.91 m)
- Listed weight: 208 lb (94 kg)

Career information
- High school: Milpitas (Milpitas, California)
- College: UCLA
- NFL draft: 2005: 6th round, 190th overall pick

Career history
- Cincinnati Bengals (2005–2007); Miami Dolphins (2008); Las Vegas Locomotives (2009–2010)

Awards and highlights
- 2× UFL champion (2009, 2010)

Career NFL statistics
- Receptions: 10
- Receiving yards: 109
- Receiving touchdowns: 1
- Stats at Pro Football Reference

Tab Wilson Perry (born January 20, 1982) is an American former professional football player who was a wide receiver in the National Football League (NFL). He was selected by the Cincinnati Bengals in the sixth round of the 2005 NFL draft. He played college football for the UCLA Bruins.

Perry was also a member of the Miami Dolphins and Las Vegas Locomotives.

== Early life ==
Perry played wide receiver and safety at Milpitas High School wearing the jersey number 3.

== College career ==
During his first three seasons at UCLA, played wide receiver and wore the jersey number 1 (because number 3 was already taken). He worked hard over the summer, attending classes at three small schools in between his junior and senior year, to remain eligible to play football at UCLA. Once it was vacated, he wore the number 3 for his senior year.

== Professional career ==
=== Cincinnati Bengals ===
Perry was expected to go somewhere around the third to fifth round of the 2005 NFL draft, but fell to the Bengals in the sixth round getting selected 190th overall. Most teams saw him primarily as a kick returner, because that was his specialty at UCLA (where he set numerous records). He wore the number 12 during preseason for the Bengals and during a short minicamp due to the late graduation date of UCLA.

Perry was used primarily as a kick returner for his first year with the Bengals. He earned special teams player of the week in a victory over the Pittsburgh Steelers due in part to a long kick return that set up the game clinching touchdown. He was listed from as high as the third down to the fifth receiver for Cincinnati.

Perry finished the 2005 season with a franchise record 1,562 kickoff return yards, and 2 touchdowns on offense, assisting the team to an 11–5 record and their first playoff appearance in over a decade. Perry was also the starting returner for the Bengals in 2006, but he suffered a season-ending injury in the second game of the year.

=== Miami Dolphins ===
On March 15, 2008, Perry signed a one-year deal worth just under $1 million with the Miami Dolphins. On May 24, he suffered a torn Achilles' tendon. He was waived/injured by the Dolphins four days later and subsequently placed on injured reserve.

=== Las Vegas Locomotives ===
Perry was signed by the Las Vegas Locomotives of the United Football League on August 31, 2009.
