= December 1938 =

Month of 1938

<<	December 1938					>>
Su	Mo	Tu	We	Th	Fr	Sa
				1	2	3
4	5	6	7	8	9	10
11	12	13	14	15	16	17
18	19	20	21	22	23	24
25	26	27	28	29	30	31

The following events occurred in December 1938:

== December 1, 1938 (Thursday) ==
- At 8:34 am, a freight train collided with a school bus in South Jordan, Utah, killing the bus driver and 23 students.
- Britain introduced a "national register" for war service.
- Two more "victims" of the Halifax Slasher confessed to faking the attacks on themselves. The panic soon wound down as doubts arose as to whether the slasher really existed.

== December 2, 1938 (Friday) ==
- The first 200 Jewish children of the Kindertransport program arrived in England.
- Born: Luis Artime, Argentine footballer; in Parque Civit

== December 3, 1938 (Saturday) ==
- Nazi Germany had a nationwide "day of solidarity" collecting street donations for the Winterhilfswerk fund. Jews were ordered to stay off the streets between noon and 8 p.m. because, according to the order issued by Heinrich Himmler, they had "no share in the solidarity of the German nation."
- Heinrich Himmler ordered all driver's licenses of Jews invalidated.
- Died: Félix Córdova Dávila, 60, Puerto Rican political leader and judge

== December 4, 1938 (Sunday) ==
- Anti-Italian riots broke out in Tunis over Italy's recent demand that France hand over Tunisia. Windows of an Italian tourist office, newspaper and bookstore were smashed, but police reinforcements prevented any such attack on the Italian consulate. 15 arrests were made.
- Born:
  - Andre Marrou, U.S. politician; in Nixon, Texas
  - Yvonne Minton, Australian opera singer; in Sydney

== December 5, 1938 (Monday) ==
- Decrees from the Reich Economic Ministry forbade Jews from buying real estate or selling securities such as stocks and bonds or jewelry. All securities were to be placed in a special foreign exchange bank which could only be accessed with government permission.
- The U.S. Supreme Court decided Lyeth v. Hoey.
- Born: JJ Cale, American musician; in Oklahoma City, Oklahoma (d. 2013)

== December 6, 1938 (Tuesday) ==
- Foreign Ministers Joachim von Ribbentrop and Georges Bonnet signed a treaty in Paris by which Germany and France guaranteed the inviolability of one another's borders and agreed to engage in mutual consultation to resolve all disputes peacefully.
- Italians marched in the streets of Rome, Genoa and Turin shouting "Tunisia and Corsica for Italy".

== December 7, 1938 (Wednesday) ==
- British Secretary of State for the Colonies Malcolm MacDonald told the House of Commons that the question of restoring colonies to Germany was not under discussion and "not now an issue in practical politics." A motion calling for the creation of an international pool of colonies under a general mandate was voted upon, but it was defeated 253-127.
- Died: Anna Marie Hahn, 32, German-born American serial killer, was executed by electric chair.

== December 8, 1938 (Thursday) ==
- Another day of violence occurred in Tunis as Italians, French and Arabs rioted during competing demonstrations. 16 were arrested.
- Heinrich Himmler issued the first Nazi decree aimed at the Romani people, ordering all Roma over the age of six to be registered with the police.
- The German aircraft carrier Graf Zeppelin was launched.
- Born:
  - John Kufuor, President of Ghana; in Kumasi, Gold Coast colony
  - Ken Delo, American singer; in River Rouge, Michigan (d. 2016)

== December 9, 1938 (Friday) ==
- István Csáky became Hungarian Foreign Minister.
- The 1939 NFL draft was held. Ki Aldrich was selected first overall by the Chicago Cardinals.

== December 10, 1938 (Saturday) ==
- The 1938 Nobel Prizes were awarded in Stockholm. The recipients were Enrico Fermi of Italy for Physics, Richard Kuhn of Germany (Chemistry), Corneille Heymans of Belgium (Physiology or Medicine) and Pearl S. Buck of the United States (Literature). In Oslo, the Nansen International Office for Refugees was given the Peace Prize. Richard Kuhn was unable to claim his award at the time due to Nazi Germany's policy of not allowing its citizens to accept Nobel Prizes after the Carl von Ossietzky controversy. Kuhn finally received his medal and diploma in 1949.
- The Toronto Argonauts beat the Winnipeg Blue Bombers 30-7 to win the 26th Grey Cup of Canadian football.

== December 11, 1938 (Sunday) ==
- Elections were held in Memel in which the Nazi Party received an overwhelming 90 percent of the vote.
- Sir Edwin Lutyens was elected President of the Royal Academy of Arts.
- The New York Giants defeated the Green Bay Packers 23-17 in the NFL Championship Game at the Polo Grounds in New York City.
- Died: Christian Lous Lange, 69, Norwegian historian, teacher and political scientist

== December 12, 1938 (Monday) ==
- A new foreign currency law in Nazi Germany restricted the possessions emigrants could take out of the country (including money and valuables) to only include items of personal use.
- Comedian George Burns pleaded guilty in a New York federal courtroom to charges of smuggling jewelry. Sentencing was deferred until January, but Burns faced a maximum of 18 years in prison and fines up to $45,000.
- The Daily Express reported that Lloyd's of London was quoting 32 to 1 odds against Britain being involved in a war before December 31, 1939.
- The U.S. Supreme Court decided Missouri ex rel. Gaines v. Canada.

== December 13, 1938 (Tuesday) ==
- Neville Chamberlain spoke to 600 journalists and diplomats at the Foreign Press Association jubilee dinner in London, saying there would be no letup in British rearmament even though he was convinced that the wish of the British and German people remained "still what it was recorded to me in the Munich Agreement – namely, never to go to war with one another again, and to settle any difference that might arise between us by the method of consultation." There were a number of empty seats at the function because the Germans boycotted after seeing an advance copy of the speech, which included a passage criticizing the German press for its tone and for rarely showing "any sign of a desire to understand our point of view."
- Clark Gable announced he was seeking a divorce from his estranged second wife Rhea. Friends of the actor disclosed that he planned to marry the actress Carole Lombard when the divorce was finalized.
- The Neuengamme concentration camp opened.
- Born:
  - Heino, German singer; in Düsseldorf-Oberbilk, Germany
  - Gus Johnson, basketball player; in Akron, Ohio (d. 1987)
- Died: Leandro Verì, Italian carabiniere, was shot in line of duty (b. 1903)

== December 14, 1938 (Wednesday) ==
- Nazi Germany cancelled all state contracts with Jewish-owned firms.

== December 15, 1938 (Thursday) ==
- At the opening ceremony of a new section of the Autobahn in Rangsdorf, Joseph Goebbels told the German people that the territories occupied by the Reich were "still too small to meet our vital needs."
- The Juan Negrín government in Spain claimed to have uncovered a Nationalist espionage ring and put 200 people on trial.
- The Nationalists announced the restoration of the citizenship and property of Alfonso XIII.
- Born: Billy Shaw, American football player; in Vicksburg, Mississippi (d. 2024)

== December 16, 1938 (Friday) ==
- Plaek Phibunsongkhram became 3rd Prime Minister of Thailand.
- The Cross of Honour of the German Mother was established.
- The film A Christmas Carol starring Reginald Owen was released.
- Born:
  - Frank Deford, sportswriter and novelist; in Baltimore, Maryland (d. 2017)
  - Liv Ullmann, Norwegian actress, in Tokyo, Japan

== December 17, 1938 (Saturday) ==
- Otto Hahn and his assistant Fritz Strassmann discovered nuclear fission at the Kaiser Wilhelm Institute in Berlin but did not realize it at the time.
- Italy sent a diplomatic note to France indicating that the Franco-Italian Agreement of 1935 was invalid because ratifications had never been exchanged.
- Wilhelm Keitel issued a secret directive on behalf of Hitler stating that preparations for the "liquidation of the rump Czech state" were to be carried out "on the assumption that no appreciable resistance is to be expected. Outwardly it must be quite clear that it is only a peaceful action and not a warlike undertaking."
- Born:
  - Carlo Little, English rock drummer; in Shepherd's Bush, London (d. 2005)
  - Peter Snell, New Zealand runner; in Opunake (d. 2019)

== December 18, 1938 (Sunday) ==
- 1938 Slovak parliamentary election
- Benito Mussolini officially inaugurated the new Sardinian coal town of Carbonia.
- Born: Roger E. Mosley, American actor; in Los Angeles (d. 2022)

== December 19, 1938 (Monday) ==
- Herschel Grynszpan appeared before a magistrate in Paris and explained why he shot Ernst vom Rath. Grynszpan said he did not intend to kill vom Rath but only wanted to shoot him as a protest against the Nazi treatment of Jews.

== December 20, 1938 (Tuesday) ==
- New York City Mayor Fiorello H. La Guardia was attacked from behind on the steps of City Hall and knocked down by a discharged WPA worker. La Guardia suffered a welt to his right cheekbone but was not seriously hurt. The assailant gave mostly incoherent responses to questioning by authorities and maintained that La Guardia knew the reason for the attack, even though the mayor said he'd never seen him before.
- Vladimir K. Zworykin received a patent for the iconoscope, fifteen years after filing a patent application.
- Born: John Harbison, American composer; in Orange, New Jersey
- Died: Annie Armstrong, 88, American Southern Baptist denominational leader

== December 21, 1938 (Wednesday) ==
- Sir John Anderson outlined a government plan in the House of Commons to construct steel air-raid shelters around Britain. The cost was set at £20 million for 20 million persons.
- Nazi Germany banned Jews from serving as midwives.

== December 22, 1938 (Thursday) ==
- Japanese Prime Minister Fumimaro Konoye gave a speech in which he proclaimed a New Order of East Asia, encompassing Japan, Manchukuo and China.
- A strange fish was found on a fishing trawler in East London, South Africa. It was later identified as a coelacanth, previously thought to be extinct.
- Born: Brian Locking, English rock bassist; in Bedworth, Warwickshire (d. 2020)

== December 23, 1938 (Friday) ==
- The Nationalists launched the Catalonia Offensive.
- Born: Bob Kahn, American internet pioneer; in Brooklyn, New York

== December 24, 1938 (Saturday) ==
- Representatives of 21 countries of the Americas met in Lima, Peru and adopted the Lima Declaration, affirming the sovereignty of Latin American states and the determination to resist foreign intervention.
- The war film The Dawn Patrol starring Errol Flynn, Basil Rathbone and David Niven was released.
- Died: Bruno Taut, 58, German architect

== December 25, 1938 (Sunday) ==
- 80 were killed in a train collision south of Chișinău in Romania.
- The radio play The Plot to Overthrow Christmas by Norman Corwin was first performed on CBS.
- Born: Duane Armstrong, American painter; in Fresno, California
- Died: Karel Čapek, 48, Czech writer, died from pneumonia.

== December 26, 1938 (Monday) ==
- The Earl Carroll Theatre opened on Sunset Boulevard in Hollywood.
- Born: Bahram Beyzai, Iranian film and theatre director; in Tehran

== December 27, 1938 (Tuesday) ==
- The Communist Party of Czechoslovakia dissolved and its leaders went into exile in the Soviet Union.
- The Soviet Union established the Medal "For Distinguished Labour".
- American opera singer Grace Moore gave the Duchess of Windsor a deep curtsey during a concert in France and started a new controversy over whether or not the duchess counted as royalty and was entitled to receive such an honor.

== December 28, 1938 (Wednesday) ==
- The Soviet Union issued a new decree aimed at slackers and frequently absent workers. The new law threatened executives with removal or arrest if they failed to deal harshly with "disorganizers of production". Maternity leave was reduced and workers were to get no vacations until they had been on the job for at least one year.
- Died: Florence Lawrence, 48 or 52, Canadian-American stage performer and film actress, committed suicide by poison.

== December 29, 1938 (Thursday) ==
- A scandal hit the French film industry when the bankrupt Pathé studio obtained warrants charging Bernard Natan and three other former associates of the company with fraud and conspiracy. The alleged embezzlement was estimated to total at least 140 million francs.
- Born: Jon Voight, American actor; in Yonkers, New York

== December 30, 1938 (Friday) ==
- Joseph Goebbels' extramarital affair with Czech actress Lída Baarová was revealed in the international press.
- Iran broke off diplomatic relations with France over an article in a Paris newspaper about a cat show. Rezā Shāh was insulted by a picture of a cat that carried the caption "His Majesty the cat" (the French word for cat is chat, pronounced the same as shah).

== December 31, 1938 (Saturday) ==
- The U.S. government refused to recognize Japan's "New Order" in the Far East.
- Austrian passports became invalid.
- The Boeing 307 Stratoliner had its first flight.
- "You Must Have Been a Beautiful Baby" by Bing Crosby topped the American singles charts.
- Born: Rosalind Cash, American actress and singer; in Atlantic City, New Jersey (d. 1995)
