= January 1939 =

Month of 1939

<<	January 1939					>>
Su	Mo	Tu	We	Th	Fr	Sa
1	2	3	4	5	6	7
8	9	10	11	12	13	14
15	16	17	18	19	20	21
22	23	24	25	26	27	28
29	30	31

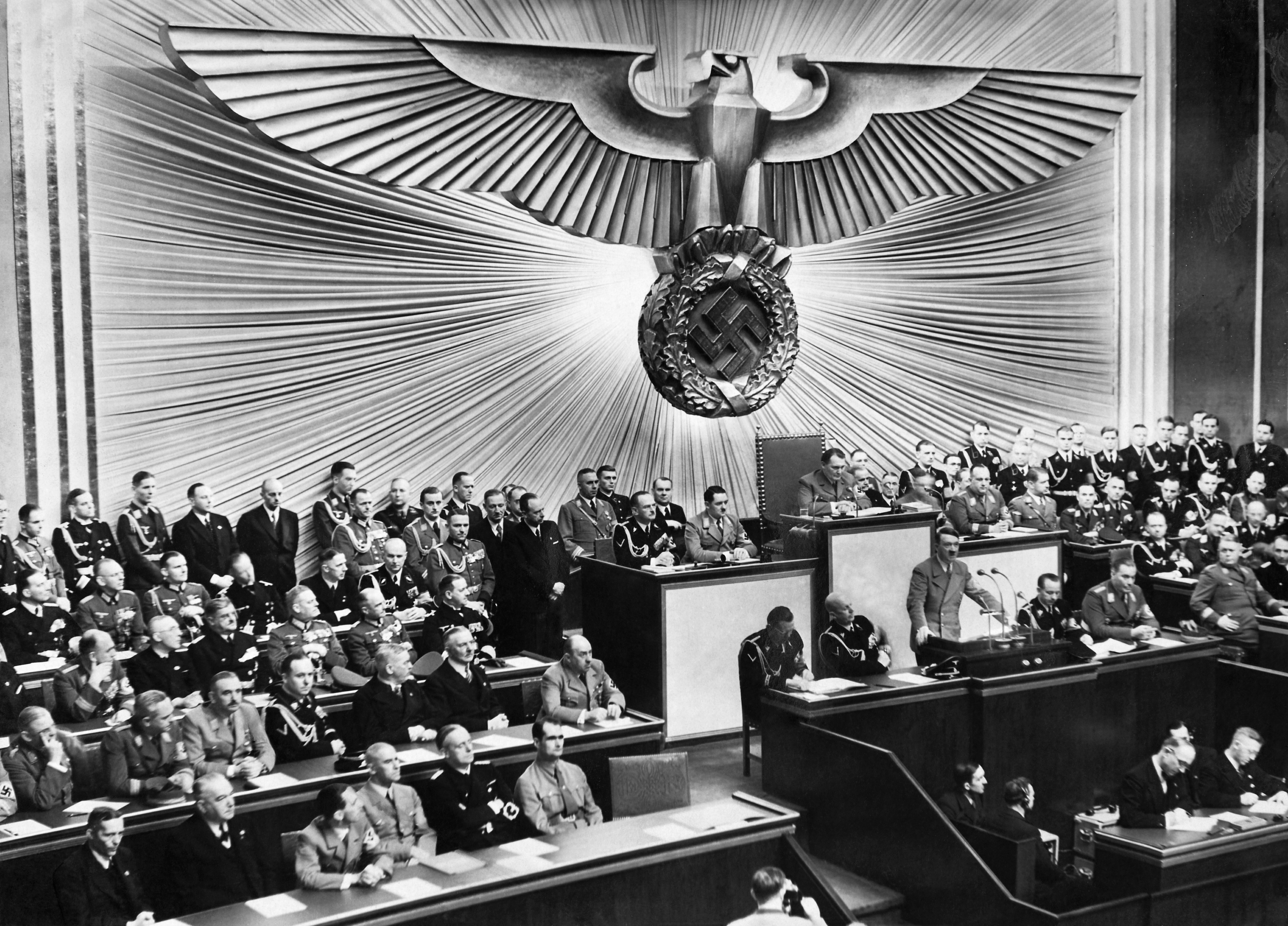
January 30, 1939: Adolf Hitler addresses the Reichstag and announces the annihilation of European Jews in the event of a war.

The following events occurred in January 1939:

== January 1, 1939 (Sunday) ==
  - Third Reich
    - Jews are forbidden to work with Germans.
    - The Youth Protection Act was passed on April 30, 1938, and the Working Hours Regulations came into effect.
    - The small businesses obligation to maintain adequate accounting came into effect.
    - The Jews name change decree has gone into effect.
    - With his traditional call to the New Year, Führer and Reich Chancellor Adolf Hitler addressed the members of the National Socialist German Workers' Party (NSDAP).
  - The rest of the world
    - In Spain, it becomes a duty of all young women under 25 to complete compulsory work service for one year.
    - First edition of the Vienna New Year's Concert.
    - The company of technology and manufacturing scientific instruments Hewlett-Packard, was founded in a garage in Palo Alto, California, by William (Bill) Hewlett and David Packard. This garage is now considered the birthplace of Silicon Valley.
    - Sydney, in Australia, records temperature of 45 ˚C, the highest record for the city.
    - Philipp Etter took over as Swiss Federal President.
    - Texas A&M became the US champion in college football.
    - The Nobel Prize-winning nuclear physicist Enrico Fermi, along with his family, left Italy to move to exile in the United States.
    - In Finland, the densely populated settlement of Vähäheikkilä was abolished and transferred from the municipality of Kaarina to the city of Turku.
    - The National Pension Act has entered into force in Finland.
    - Launch of the Third Soviet Five Year Plan.
    - In the proposal of the Congregation of the Mosaic, the Swedish government approves the acceptance of about 1000 Jews from Germany as refugees in transit. The parish is responsible for them and visa requirements are introduced for all non-Nordic refugees in country.
- Born: Michèle Mercier, actress, in Nice, France

== January 2, 1939 (Monday) ==
- USC Trojans defeated the Duke Blue Devils 7-3 in the 25th Rose Bowl.
- TCU Horned Frogs defeated Carnegie Tech Titans 15-7 at the Sugar Bowl.
- The Tennessee Volunteers beat the Oklahoma Sooners 17-0 in the Orange Bowl.
- Saint Mary's Gaels defeated the Texas Tech Red Raiders 20-14 in the Cotton Bowl Classic.
- Allan Tomlinson won the Australian Grand Prix. The race would not be held again until 1947.
- Died: Roman Dmowski, 74, Polish politician

== January 3, 1939 (Tuesday) ==
- The Battle of the Segre ended in Nationalist victory.
- The U.S. Supreme Court decided Ford Motor Co. v. NLRB.
- Born: Arik Einstein, singer and actor, in Tel Aviv, Mandatory Palestine (d. 2013); Bobby Hull, ice hockey player, in Point Anne, Ontario, Canada (d. 2023); Ruben Reyes, jurist, in Hagonoy, Bulacan, Philippines (d. 2021); Gene Summers, singer, in Dallas (d. 2021)

== January 4, 1939 (Wednesday) ==
- U.S. President Franklin D. Roosevelt gave the 1939 State of the Union Address to Congress. "A war which threatened to envelop the world in flames has been averted; but it has become increasingly clear that world peace is not assured", Roosevelt warned. "The deadline of danger from within and from without is not within our control. The hour-glass may be in the hands of other nations. Our own hour-glass tells us that we are off on a race to make democracy work, so that we may be efficient in peace and therefore secure in national defense."
- The Nationalists captured Borjas Blancas.

== January 5, 1939 (Thursday) ==
- The Battle of Valsequillo began.
- Polish Foreign Minister Józef Beck visited Adolf Hitler at the Berghof and was surprised when Hitler demanded that the Free City of Danzig be returned to Germany. Hitler offered a guarantee on Poland's borders if a "final settlement" on Danzig could be reached. Beck avoided committing to a response but said that Polish public opinion would oppose any change in Danzig's status.
- Hiranuma Kiichirō became Prime Minister of Japan.
- Judge Clarence Elliot Craig of the Superior Court of the County of Los Angeles County declared Amelia Earhart to be legally dead, in absentia. Earhart and her navigator, Fred Noonan, had disappeared over the Pacific Ocean on July 2, 1937, while circumnavigating the world.

== January 6, 1939 (Friday) ==
- Al Capone was transferred out of Alcatraz Federal Penitentiary and sent to a prison on Terminal Island to serve the last year of his sentence.
- Born: Valeriy Lobanovskyi, footballer and manager, in Kiev, USSR (d. 2002); Murray Rose, English-born Australian swimmer, actor and sportscaster, in Birmingham (d. 2012)

== January 7, 1939 (Saturday) ==
- The German battleship Scharnhorst entered commission.
- French physicist Marguerite Perey identified francium, the last chemical element first discovered in nature, as a decay product of ^{227}Ac.

== January 8, 1939 (Sunday) ==
- The radio anthology series The Screen Guild Theater premiered on CBS.
- Died: Charles Eastman, 80, Native American physician, writer, lecturer and reformer

== January 9, 1939 (Monday) ==
- A new Reich Chancellery designed by Albert Speer was inaugurated on the Voßstraße in Berlin.
- Brush fires started by a heat wave burned throughout the Australian state of Victoria.
- Born: Jimmy Boyd, musician and actor, in McComb, Mississippi (d. 2009); Susannah York, actress, in Chelsea, London, England (d. 2011)

== January 10, 1939 (Tuesday) ==
- British Prime Minister Neville Chamberlain and his foreign minister Lord Halifax met with their French counterparts Édouard Daladier and Georges Bonnet in Paris. Britain agreed to stand with France in rejecting any Italian terrorial demands made upon French colonial possessions.
- Comedian Jack Benny was indicted by a federal grand jury on charges of smuggling jewelry, in part of the same investigation that George Burns had already pleaded guilty to.
- Born: Sal Mineo, actor, in the Bronx, New York (d. 1976); Bill Toomey, track and field athlete, in Philadelphia

== January 11, 1939 (Wednesday) ==
- Neville Chamberlain and Lord Halifax traveled on to Rome and met with Benito Mussolini. Chamberlain hoped to persuade Mussolini to advise Hitler not to make any warlike moves. Mussolini said that Italy desired peace but made no promises. Chamberlain was heartened by the loud cheers he received from Italians during his visit.
- Born: Anne Heggtveit, alpine ski racer, in Ottawa, Ontario, Canada

== January 12, 1939 (Thursday) ==
- Chamberlain and Mussolini ended their face-to-face talks with nothing concrete accomplished.
- Born: William Lee Golden, country music singer, in Brewton, Alabama

== January 13, 1939 (Friday) ==
- Hungary agreed to join the Anti-Comintern Pact.
- The Nationalists captured Tortosa.
- A British delegation led by Neville Chamberlain met Pope Pius XI. The pope talked of the resistance democracies must make against the dangerous regimes of the world, as well as racial persecution and the need to help refugees.
- Arthur "Doc" Barker, Dale Stamphill, William Martin, Rufus McCain and Henri Young tried to escape from Alcatraz Federal Penitentiary by sawing through their cell bars and then bending the bars of a window. Prison guards spotted them at the shoreline – three of the five men surrendered but Barker and Stamphill refused and were shot. Barker died from his injuries.
- The casting of Vivien Leigh to play Scarlett O'Hara in the film adaptation of Gone With the Wind was announced.
- The horror film Son of Frankenstein starring Basil Rathbone, Boris Karloff and Bela Lugosi was released.
- The Black Friday bushfires in Australia kill 71 people during an intense heatwave, which saw Melbourne record temperatures of 45.6°C
- Died: Arthur Barker, 39, American criminal (shot trying to escape Alcatraz); Jacob Ruppert, 71, American businessman, politician and owner of the New York Yankees baseball team

== January 14, 1939 (Saturday) ==
- Norway laid claim to about a million square miles in the Antarctic to be used for whaling.
- The Reich Propaganda Ministry notified the German press that Hitler was no longer to be referred to as "Führer and Reich Chancellor" but was now to be called simply "Führer".

== January 15, 1939 (Sunday) ==
- The Nationalists captured Tarragona.
- The first-ever National Football League All-Star Game was played at Wrigley Field in Los Angeles. The reigning NFL champions the New York Giants defeated a team of all-stars, 13-10.
- The musical revue Set to Music by Noël Coward opened at the Music Box Theatre on Broadway.

== January 16, 1939 (Monday) ==
- Three early morning bomb explosions occurred in the London suburbs, one of them knocking out a power station in the north of the city that affected 25,000 people. These were the first of the S-Plan bombings conducted by the Irish Republican Army against public utilities on the British mainland. A further explosion in Manchester killed a railway porter.
- Superman premiered as a daily newspaper comic strip.
- A column by noted American gossip writer Hedda Hopper denounced the choice of Vivien Leigh to play Scarlett O'Hara in Gone With the Wind, criticizing the casting of an English actress in such a sought-after American role. Hopper printed a letter from a reader predicting that millions of Americans would stay away from the film in protest.

== January 17, 1939 (Tuesday) ==
- The U.S. Senate unanimously confirmed the appointment of Felix Frankfurter to the Supreme Court.
- A board of trustees of the New York Yankees, newly created in accordance with the will of the late Jacob Ruppert, met for the first time. Ed Barrow was made team president.
- Born: Christodoulos of Athens, Archbishop of Athens and All Greece, in Xanthi, Greece (d. 2008); Maury Povich, television presenter and talk show host, in Washington, D.C.

== January 18, 1939 (Wednesday) ==
- British police arrested 14 suspected IRA members and seized large quantities of ammunition in their investigation of the S-Plan bombings.
- Born: Bo Gritz, Vietnam War veteran and U.S. presidential candidate, in Enid, Oklahoma
- Died: Ivan Mosjoukine, 49, Russian film actor (tuberculosis)

== January 19, 1939 (Thursday) ==
- The German cruiser Seydlitz was launched.
- Born: Philip Everly, member of The Everly Brothers rock and roll duo, in Chicago (d. 2014)

== January 20, 1939 (Friday) ==
- Adolf Hitler dismissed Hjalmar Schacht as President of the Reichsbank and appointed Walther Funk to replace him.
- The Nationalists captured Calaf.
- Bugs Moran and two other defendants were acquitted of forgery charges in a Chicago court.
- Born: Chandra Wickramasinghe, mathematician, astronomer and astrobiologist, in Colombo, British Ceylon

== January 21, 1939 (Saturday) ==
- Czechoslovak Foreign Minister František Chvalkovský went to Berlin to see Adolf Hitler, who made a series of harsh demands. Czechoslovakia was ordered to quit the League of Nations, drastically reduce the size of its military, do as Germany instructed with regard to foreign policy and pass antisemitic legislation.

== January 22, 1939 (Sunday) ==
- The first Albanian Cup of football was awarded to KF Tirana. The Cup was not awarded again until 1948.

== January 23, 1939 (Monday) ==
- After thirty months of civil war, the Second Spanish Republic finally declared martial law.
- British Prime Minister Neville Chamberlain launched a recruitment drive with the goal of mobilizing 30 million Britons for the voluntary civil defense army.
- Died: Matthias Sindelar, 35, Austrian footballer (carbon monoxide poisoning, possibly suicide)

== January 24, 1939 (Tuesday) ==
- The Chillán earthquake devastated Chile, killing about 28,000 people.
- The adventure film Gunga Din starring Cary Grant, Victor McLaglen and Douglas Fairbanks, Jr. premiered in Los Angeles.
- Born: Ray Stevens, singer and comedian, in Clarkdale, Georgia
- Died: Maximilian Bircher-Benner, 71, Swiss physician and nutritionist

== January 25, 1939 (Wednesday) ==
- The Juan Negrín government fled Barcelona. Another capital was set up in Figueres the following day.
- Refik Saydam became Prime Minister of Turkey.
- Joe Louis retained the world heavyweight boxing title, defeating John Henry Lewis in the first round at Madison Square Garden. The referee stopped the bout after 2 minutes and 29 seconds once Lewis had been knocked down three times. It was Lewis' last fight.
- Sir Stafford Cripps was expelled from the Labour Party for advocating the creation of a Popular Front.
- Died: Helen Ware, 61, American actress

== January 26, 1939 (Thursday) ==
- German Foreign Minister Joachim von Ribbentrop went to Warsaw to meet with Józef Beck and repeated Hitler's offer of January 5. Beck once again only said he was willing to consider the offer, which Ribbentrop understood to mean rejection.
- Principal photography began on Gone with the Wind.

== January 27, 1939 (Friday) ==
- Hitler approved Plan Z, an ambitious naval construction program that would give the Kriegsmarine some 800 ships by 1948.

== January 28, 1939 (Saturday) ==
- The first of two days of Nationalist air raids known as the Bombing of La Garriga occurred.
- The Nationalists reported the capture of Arenys de Mar.
- Died: W. B. Yeats, 73, Irish poet

== January 29, 1939 (Sunday) ==
- Subhas Chandra Bose was re-elected President of the Indian National Congress, despite Mahatma Gandhi's support of his opponent Bhogaraju Pattabhi Sitaramayya.
- Born: Germaine Greer, academic and writer, in Melbourne, Australia
- Died: George Weinberg, 37 or 38, American mobster (suicide)

== January 30, 1939 (Monday) ==
- Hitler made a speech to the Reichstag on the sixth anniversary of the Nazis' coming to power, predicting that if "Jewish financiers" started a war, the result would be "the annihilation of the Jewish race in Europe."
- The German National Prize for Art and Science was presented for the second and final year.

== January 31, 1939 (Tuesday) ==
- President Roosevelt held a meeting with several powerful senators in the Oval Office and said that "the safety of the Rhine frontier does necessarily interest us." When asked if he meant that he considered the Rhine frontier to be America's frontier, the president said he did not, but "practically speaking if the Rhine frontiers are threatened the rest of the world is too." Someone at the meeting leaked the details to the press, resulting in a wave of alarmist articles warning the American public, which mostly favored isolationism at the time, that Roosevelt was prepared to entangle the country in a European war.
- George Burns was fined $8,000 for jewelry smuggling in addition to the $9,770 already paid in duties and penalties. He was also sentenced to a year and a day in prison but that sentence was suspended.
- The Berliner Tageblatt was shut down by the Nazis.
- The last issue of the Austrian newspaper Neue Freie Presse was published.
