= Lloyd L. Gaines =

Plaintiff in 1930s U.S. civil rights case who disappeared

- Lloyd Gaines
- Born: Lloyd Lionel Gaines; 1911; Water Valley, Mississippi, U.S.
- Disappeared: March 19, 1939 (aged 27 or 28); Chicago, Illinois, U.S.
- Status: Missing for 87 years, 5 months and 14 days
- Education: Harris-Stowe State University; Lincoln University (BA); University of Michigan (MA)

Lloyd Lionel Gaines (born 1911 – disappeared March 19, 1939) was the plaintiff in Gaines v. Canada (1938), one of the most important early court cases in the 20th-century U.S. civil rights movement. After being denied admission to the University of Missouri School of Law because he was African American, and refusing the university's offer to pay for him to attend a neighboring state's law school that had no racial restriction, Gaines filed suit. The U.S. Supreme Court ultimately ruled in his favor, holding that the separate but equal doctrine required that Missouri either admit him or set up a separate law school for black students.

The Missouri General Assembly chose the latter option. It authorized conversion of a former cosmetology school in St. Louis to establish the Lincoln University School of Law, to which other, mostly black, students were admitted. The National Association for the Advancement of Colored People (NAACP), which had supported Gaines's suit, planned to file another one challenging the adequacy of the new law school. While waiting for classes to begin, Gaines traveled between St. Louis, Kansas City and Chicago looking for work. He worked odd jobs and gave speeches before local NAACP chapters. One night in Chicago he left the fraternity house where he was staying and never returned. He was never seen again by anyone who knew or recognized him.

Gaines's disappearance was not noted immediately, since he frequently traveled independently and alone, without telling anyone his plans. Only in late 1939, when the NAACP's lawyers were unable to locate him to take depositions for a rehearing in state court, did a serious search begin. It failed, and the suit was dismissed. While most of his family believed at the time that he had been killed in retaliation for his legal victory, there has been speculation that Gaines had tired of his role in the movement and gone elsewhere, either New York or Mexico City, to start a new life. In 2007 the Federal Bureau of Investigation (FBI) agreed to look into the case, among many other missing persons cold cases related to the civil rights era.

His unknown fate notwithstanding, Gaines has been honored by the University of Missouri School of Law and the state. The Black Culture Center at the University of Missouri and a scholarship at its law school are named for him and another black student initially denied admission. In 2006 Gaines was posthumously granted an honorary law degree. The state bar granted him a posthumous law license. A portrait of Gaines hangs in the University of Missouri law school building.

== Early life ==
Born in 1911 in Water Valley, Mississippi, Gaines moved with his mother, Callie Gaines, and siblings to St. Louis, Missouri, in 1926 after the death of their father, Henry Gaines. Part of the Great Migration from rural communities in the South to industrial cities in the North, his family settled in the city's Central West End neighborhood. Gaines did well academically, and was a valedictorian at Vashon High School, one of the two historically all-black high schools in the area.

Gaines was placed in the fifth grade at fifteen years old because of his education in Mississippi. He caught up quickly, completing four years of grammar school in only two years and four years of high school in only three. While Gaines supported his family with an after-school job, he graduated first in his class.

After winning a $250 ($5,000 in current dollars) scholarship in an essay contest, Gaines went to college. He attended Stowe Teachers College in St. Louis for one year before transferring. He graduated with honors and a bachelor's in history from Lincoln University, a historically black college in Jefferson City, Missouri. It was the state's segregated undergraduate institution for African Americans.

To cover the gap between his scholarship and the college's tuition, he sold magazines on the street. Gaines was elected as president of the senior class and a brother in the Alpha Phi Alpha fraternity.

== Law school application ==
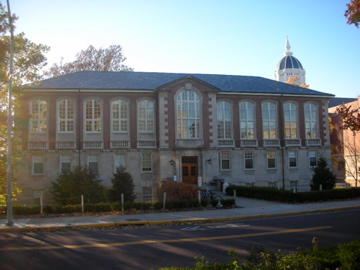
Tate Hall, home to the University of Missouri School of Law in the late 1930s

Following his 1935 graduation, during the Great Depression, Gaines unsuccessfully sought work as a teacher.

Around that time, NAACP lawyer Charles Hamilton Houston was looking for a plaintiff to bring a case challenging Missouri's Jim Crow laws that restricted the University of Missouri to white students. He sent St. Louis lawyer Sidney Revels Redmond, one of three dozen African Americans then admitted to the Missouri bar, to visit the university's Columbia campus, with instructions to take pictures of buildings that housed departments and courses of study not available at Lincoln University, and obtain admission forms.

In June 1935, Gaines had requested a catalog and admission form from Sy Woodson Canada, registrar, of the University of Missouri Law School. They were sent to his address at Lincoln in Jefferson City. By August he applied for admission, encouraged by Lorenzo Greene, a Lincoln University professor and veteran civil rights activist. Accounts vary as to whether Gaines did this on his own initiative or was encouraged by the NAACP, in order to have a plaintiff, without any interest in a legal career. When Redmond informed Houston that Gaines was willing to be a plaintiff, Houston initially asked for another candidate. Houston later accepted Gaines, when it became apparent he was the only available plaintiff, but never explained what his initial objections might have been.

At first Canada did not realize that Gaines was black, since the application form did not ask for prospective students to indicate their race. Only when he received Gaines' transcript from Lincoln University did he understand. He left Gaines's application on his desk, without taking any action, although the young man was otherwise qualified for admission to the law school. Canada sent Gaines a telegram urging him to meet with the registrar to discuss "further advice" and "possible arrangement". Gaines wrote both the president of Lincoln to ask what this meant, and to Frederick Middlebush, president of University of Missouri, requesting admission to the law school. Middlebush never replied.

== Lawsuit ==
The official policy of Missouri was to pay the "out of state" expenses for education of African Americans who wished to study law until such time as demand was sufficient to build a separate law school within the state for them. At first Houston and Redmond hoped that the ruling in University of Maryland v. Murray (1936), which they had won when Maryland's Court of Appeals invalidated a similar provision there, would persuade Missouri to allow Gaines to attend without legal resistance. They began planning security arrangements for him.

They filed a writ of mandamus in January 1936 ordering that Gaines's application be considered. When Middlebush asked the university's board how it should respond, the lawyers recommended defending their policy. They adopted a resolution formally denying Gaines's admission, arguing that segregated higher education was the public policy of the state, and that Gaines had the legal option of attending law school outside Missouri at the state's expense.

With Gaines's application formally denied, the mandamus petition was now moot. Houston and the NAACP filed another petition, State ex rel. Gaines v. Canada, arguing that the law school's refusal to admit him on racial grounds was a violation of his Fourteenth Amendment rights. The university responded with the same points it had made in the board's resolution. Further, it said that Gaines should have sued Lincoln to compel it to open a law school. Gaines and his lawyers argued in response that lawyers educated out of state lost the benefit of courses that were specific to Missouri law, as well as the connections and firsthand experience of the state's courts that were gained by an in-state legal education.

The NAACP did not expect to overturn the "separate but equal" standard set by the US Supreme Court's 1896 Plessy v. Ferguson decision, which allowed states to impose legal racial segregation, but to undermine it by requiring states that had segregated education to provide the "equal" part of the ruling. They targeted graduate and professional public institutions of higher learning. Unlike most other segregated facilities, these were few in number and under centralized state control. They expected that if the court ruled in their favor, segregationist states would realize they had to choose between the expense of developing duplicates of such institutions for a small group of African Americans and integrating existing facilities, and that those states would pragmatically choose the latter. Houston believed that, since such graduate schools served small portions of the population, attempts to integrate them would incite less public opposition than efforts to integrate public elementary and secondary schools. Lastly, judges had been educated in law schools and could be expected to understand the adverse effects of inequalities on students.

Houston and the other NAACP attorneys were encouraged in this strategy by their victory in Murray, two years earlier. In Missouri, the racial bar to attendance was by state law rather than administrative regulation. The NAACP hoped to get the US Supreme Court to hear the case and establish a precedent.

=== Trial ===
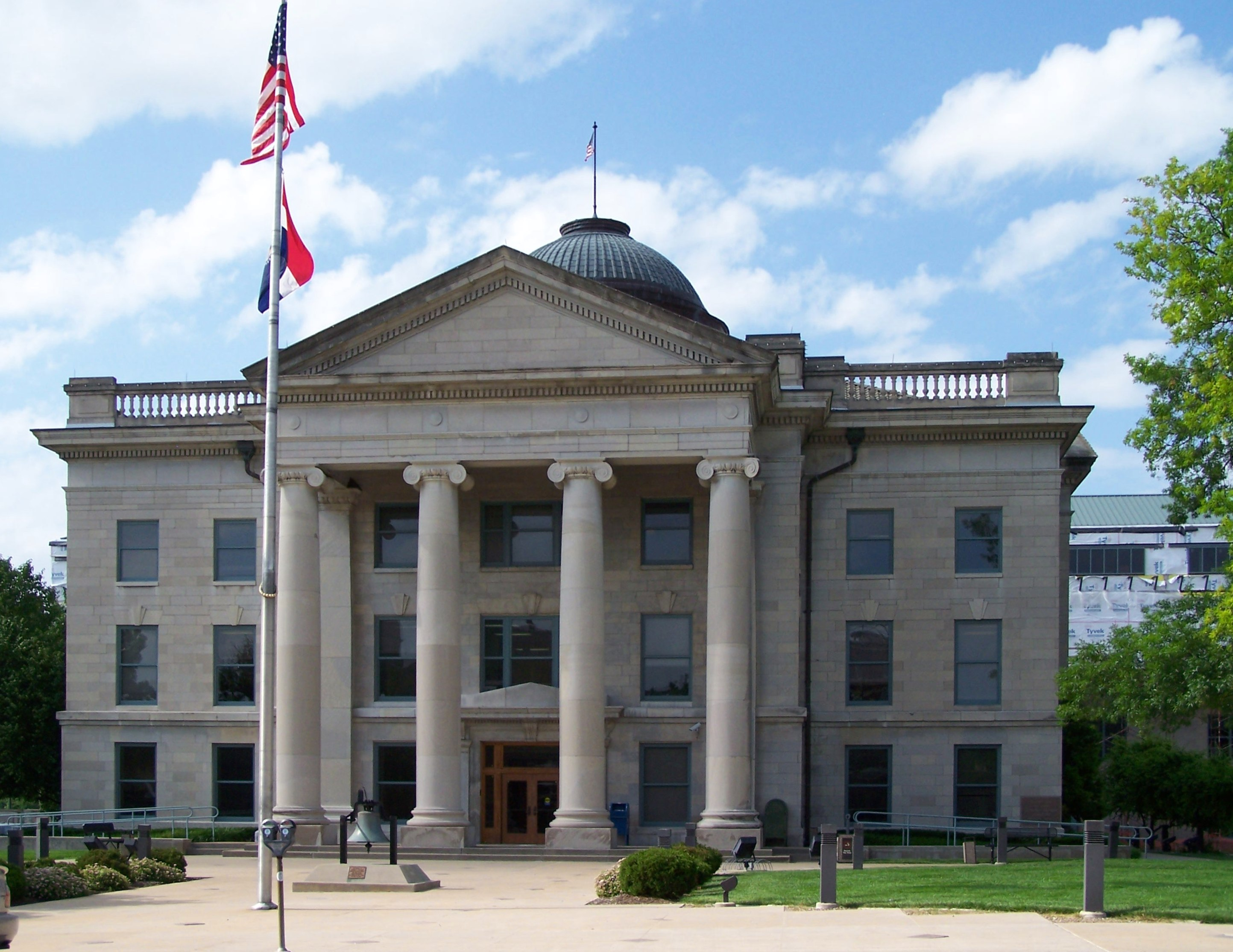
The Boone County Courthouse, where Gaines's case was tried

Houston, Redmond and Gaines drove to Columbia, Missouri for the July 1936 trial at Boone County Courthouse. They arrived as the courthouse was beginning to open for the morning. Due to that summer's severe heat and drought, many of the white farmers from surrounding communities were there, waiting to apply for financial relief. Some went into the courtroom to take in the unusual sight, at that time, of African-American lawyers arguing a case.

They were joined by a hundred current University of Missouri law students, reporters, and a few local African Americans. Two recent local lynchings had discouraged most of the local black community from attending, although local NAACP chapters tried to encourage attendance. African Americans sat among the whites, since the courtroom facilities were not segregated. The lawyers for both sides shared a table, and shook hands before the case.

By the time the trial began, the heat outside already exceeded 100 °F (38 °C). The crowds and poor ventilation made it even hotter in the courtroom. Judge W.M. Dinwiddie suggested to the lawyers that he and they remove their jackets.

During his opening arguments, Houston reiterated that Gaines's exclusion from the law school solely on racial grounds violated his constitutional rights. Representing the state, William Hogsett conceded in his argument that Gaines was an excellent and qualified student with a right to a legal education, as long as it was somewhere other than the state university's law school. He noted that racial segregation was public policy of the state, codified in the constitution and laws enacted by its legislature elected by the people, which prohibited African-American students from attending University of Missouri law school.

Presentation of witnesses began with Gaines testifying on his own behalf that he wished to attend Missouri's law school because of its quality. He did not want to attend law school out of state, even at the state's expense, because Columbia was more convenient to his home in St. Louis than the law schools of neighboring states' universities. And at one of those schools, he would not be as able to develop the expertise in Missouri law necessary to practice in the state as he would be at Missouri's law school.

On cross-examination, Hogsett suggested that Gaines was interested in applying to law school only to act as a plaintiff in this lawsuit, pressing Gaines on when he had contacted the NAACP after he had learned that his application had been denied. Had he ever seen a black student attending the university? Why had he refused, in an earlier deposition, to answer a question about whether he would have been interested in attending a hypothetical Lincoln law school? Gaines conceded that some of the out-of-state law schools were closer to St. Louis than Columbia, and cost less to travel to, per evidence the state introduced, but noted that students there were not compelled to choose them. Hogsett concluded by asking Gaines if he was aware that black students were not accepted at Missouri's law school when he applied; Gaines said he had not been.

Houston next called law school dean William Masterton to the stand as a hostile witness. Masterson denied that there was any special benefit to attending the law school for a student interested in Missouri law in particular, since the other law schools Gaines could have attended all used the same casebook as Missouri. He maintained this position even when Houston reminded him that the school's law review had a stated editorial policy of publishing one article in every issue that addressed an issue specific to Missouri. Houston showed him the Iowa law school's catalog, which touted the benefits of attending for a student interested in practicing law in Iowa. On cross-examination, Masterson claimed not to know details of the admissions process or the school's budget, (Note: Houston later described Masterson as "wriggling like an earthworm" during his testimony, with this claim "the most complete lapse of memory" he ever saw in his career.) and could not answer Houston's question as to whether or not Missouri's was the only public law school in the state.

Other state and university officials took the stand, with both sides using their testimony to buttress their cases. Canada told Houston that to his knowledge black students were the only ones barred from the university on account of their race; the university's assistant secretary added later that the school not only admitted students from overseas but extended financial aid to them if necessary. Robert Witherspoon, an African-American lawyer who practiced in St. Louis, testified that having had to attend law school out of state had put him at a disadvantage.

State Senator F.M. McDavid, chair of the state's Board of Regents, testified on direct examination that the admission of a black student would be very disruptive for the university and its students, undermining a hundred years of tradition. Houston asked on cross if he really believed that that tradition "could bind progress forever." McDavid also worried that it would be "very unhappy" for Gaines. But when Houston asked him also if he was aware of any problems caused by the admission of a black student at Maryland following that lawsuit, McDavid said he was not, as he had not researched the issue.

Hogsett presented his case for the audience, some of whom nodded in sympathy with his arguments, while Houston concentrated on getting facts in the record for appeal, hopefully to the U.S. Supreme Court, the only venue where he expected and wanted to prevail. Two weeks later Dinwiddie held for the state, without writing an opinion. Gaines appealed to the Missouri Supreme Court.

=== Appeals ===
==== Missouri Supreme Court ====
The state's highest court heard the arguments near the end of the year. While normally it sat in two divisions, the case was considered so important that all seven justices were present. Two months later, it upheld Judge Dinwiddie.

In his opinion for a unanimous court, Justice William Francis Frank conceded that the state's constitution's provision requiring that its public schools be racially segregated did not explicitly extend to higher education. But that did not mean the legislature was barred from making such a prohibition. Despite language in one statute, which Gaines had relied on, saying that the university was open to "all youths" of the state, the legislature had gone to great lengths to create Lincoln and differentiate between white and black colleges.

Citing both Plessy and his own court's prior holdings, Frank reiterated that this segregation did not violate the Fourteenth Amendment: "The right of a state to separate the races for the purpose of education is no longer an open question." He also rejected a due process argument, that Gaines had been unconstitutionally deprived of his proprietary interest in the university as a citizen and taxpayer of Missouri. "[E]quality and not identity of school advantages is what the law guarantees to every citizen, white or black."

Frank addressed the only remaining question, whether, as Gaines alleged, his legal education out of state would have been the equal of that he could have received at Missouri's law school. He accepted the law school's evidence about its non-specialization in the state's law and similarities in its curriculum to the neighboring state's law schools. As for the distance involved, some of those schools, such as Illinois's, were closer to St. Louis than Columbia would be for residents of Caruthersville, in the state's southeastern Bootheel. And if Gaines were to attend school outside the state, the state would subsidize his living expenses while he did, costs he would have to bear himself if he went to Missouri.

Lastly, Frank distinguished Gaines's case from Murray by noting that that state's Court of Appeals had found that Maryland had made no provisions for establishing a law school for black students and did not financially support those who attended law school out of state, unlike Missouri. He believed that the construction of a law school for blacks at Lincoln would satisfy Gaines's desires if he could wait.

==== U.S. Supreme Court ====
Houston and Redmond successfully petitioned to the United States Supreme Court for certiorari. Now known as Gaines v. Canada, the case was argued in November 1938. Houston said the state's offer to pay for Gaines to attend law school out of state could not guarantee him a legal education equal to that offered white students at Missouri.

A month later a 6-2 (Note: Justice Benjamin Cardozo had recently died, and Felix Frankfurter had not yet been appointed to take his place, leaving one seat vacant.) majority ordered the State of Missouri either to admit Gaines to the University of Missouri School of Law or to provide another school of equal stature within the state borders. Chief Justice Charles Evans Hughes wrote for the majority:

The basic consideration is not as to what sort of opportunities other States provide, or whether they are as good as those in Missouri, but as to what opportunities Missouri itself furnishes to white students and denies to negroes solely upon the ground of color. The admissibility of laws separating the races in the enjoyment of privileges afforded by the State rests wholly upon the equality of the privileges which the laws give to the separated groups within the State. The question here is not of a duty of the State to supply legal training, or of the quality of the training which it does supply, but of its duty when it provides such training to furnish it to the residents of the State upon the basis of an equality of right. By the operation of the laws of Missouri, a privilege has been created for white law students which is denied to negroes by reason of their race. The white resident is afforded legal education within the State; the negro resident having the same qualifications is refused it there and must go outside the State to obtain it. That is a denial of the equality of legal right to the enjoyment of the privilege which the State has set up, and the provision for the payment of tuition fees in another State does not remove the discrimination.

The case articulated an important rule of law in the sequence of NAACP cases leading to the eventual order for desegregation of public schools: that any academic program that a state provided to whites had to have an equivalent available to blacks. The Gaines holding helped the NAACP lay the foundation for the Supreme Court's landmark 1954 ruling in Brown v. Board of Education, holding that separate facilities for public schools were inherently unequal and ordering such schools to be desegregated, thus overturning Plessy.

Since the Supreme Court had ordered the Missouri Supreme Court to rehear the case in light of its ruling, Gaines's legal battle was not over. Historian Gary Lavergne describes Gaines during this period as "high-maintenance": he sought media attention, then complained about how stressful it was being the center of that attention. Heman Marion Sweatt, later the plaintiff in another desegregation case heard by the Supreme Court, worked with Gaines at the University of Michigan. The NAACP had paid for him to attend graduate school there and Sweatt reportedly found Gaines "rather arrogant".

After working as a clerk for the Works Progress Administration in Michigan and completing his master's in economics, Gaines returned to Missouri in anticipation of the proceedings there, set to begin in August. The Missouri legislature hastily passed a bill appropriating $275,000 ($6.37 million in current dollars) to convert an old beauty school in St. Louis into the new Lincoln University School of Law, in the hope that would satisfy the court. The NAACP planned to challenge the establishment of the new law school as still inadequate compared to the resources of the existing University of Missouri School of Law.

Gaines, who would need to pay his law school tuition as well as his daily living expenses, looked for work in the meantime. Between the continuing Depression and segregation, he had to settle for work at a gas station. He gave speeches to local NAACP chapters and church groups while seeking donations, telling them "I am ready, willing and able to enroll in the law department at the University of Missouri in September, and I have the fullest intention of doing so," but he still had to borrow money from his brother George for everyday expenses.

Gaines quit the job at the gas station when he discovered the owner was purposely mislabeling low-grade fuel as high-grade. He feared getting caught in the legal consequences should the fraud be discovered. After taking a train across the state to Kansas City to give a speech to the local NAACP chapter and look, unsuccessfully, for work, he boarded another train for Chicago. There he reunited with the Page family, friends and neighbors from his youth in the Central West End. He stayed at a local YMCA.

== Disappearance ==
Over the next several weeks, Gaines looked for work and visited with the Pages. While he maintained at public appearances that he was determined to continue his court case until its end and to attend the University of Missouri School of Law, in private he was becoming increasingly ambivalent. His mother later said that he had decided not to go, as they both believed it was "too dangerous." Nancy Page later recalled asking Gaines directly about this. "His answer wasn't straightforward, and if I remember correctly, he said something like this: 'If I don't go, I will have at least made it possible for some other boy or girl to go.'"

In his last letter to his mother, dated March 3, Gaines wrote:

As for my publicity relative to the university case, I have found that my race still likes to applaud, shake hands, pat me on the back and say how great and noble is the idea: how historical and socially important the case but — and it ends ... Off and out of the confines of the publicity columns, I am just a man — not one who has fought and sacrificed to make the case possible: one who is still fighting and sacrificing — almost the 'supreme sacrifice' to see that it is a complete and lasting success for thirteen million Negroes — no! — just another man. Sometimes I wish I were just a plain, ordinary man whose name no one recognized.

Gaines had begun his letter by telling his mother that he had gone to Chicago "hoping to find it possible to make my own way." He ended with "Should I forget to write for a time, don't worry about it. I can look after myself OK."

Gaines also wrote that his accommodations at the YMCA were paid through March 7, and that if he stayed in Chicago beyond that date, he would have to make "other arrangements". After that, brothers at an Alpha Phi Alpha house took him in. He continued to have dinner at the Pages' home.

Nancy Page said that Gaines had told her he had taken a job at a department store. A reporter later found that although he had been hired, Gaines never reported for what would have been his first day of work. In the last days that she had contact with Gaines, Page said he seemed "to be running away from something". Gaines's family members and descendants believe he—and possibly the family as a whole—had received death threats. Given their background in rural Mississippi, where they knew of lynchings, they would have been too fearful to report such threats to the police.

Gaines's financial woes continued. The Alpha Phi Alpha brothers took up a collection for him. Gaines promised the Pages that he would repay their generosity by taking them out to dinner on the night of March 19 but he never got the chance to do so. Earlier that evening, Gaines told the house attendant at Alpha Phi Alpha that he was going out to buy stamps, although the weather was cold and wet. Gaines never returned, and no one ever reported seeing him again.

== Aftermath ==
Gaines had left a duffel bag filled with clothing at the fraternity house when he disappeared. Since he had had a history of leaving for days at a time with little or no notice to his friends and family, and often kept to himself, his absence seemed unremarkable at first. No one reported him missing to the police in either Chicago or St. Louis.

Several months later, people became aware that he was missing. In August, Houston and Sidney Redmond went looking for Gaines, as they had begun to argue his case at the Missouri Supreme Court's rehearing. They could not locate him. Redmond said later that the Gaines family was neither concerned nor very helpful in trying to do so. The Lincoln University School of Law in St. Louis opened in late September, and pickets denounced it as a segregationist sham. Thirty students had been admitted to the first year and they arrived for classes, but Gaines was not among them. Since only Gaines had been denied admission to the University of Missouri School of Law, only he had standing to pursue the case before the Supreme Court of Missouri. The case could not proceed without him.

Near the end of 1939, the NAACP began a frantic effort to find Gaines. There were rumors that he had been killed or committed suicide, or that he had been paid to disappear and was living in Mexico City or teaching school in New York. The story received widespread media attention, and Gaines's photograph was published in newspapers across the country, with a plea for anyone with information to contact the NAACP. No credible leads were received. In his 1948 memoir, NAACP president Walter White said, "He [Gaines] has been variously reported in Mexico, apparently supplied with ample funds, and in other parts of North America."

Lavergne notes that Houston, Marshall, and Redmond never publicly called for an investigation of Gaines's disappearance or said that they believed he had met with foul play. Since extrajudicial abductions and murders of African Americans who challenged segregation were not unheard of at the time, and the three lawyers frequently spoke out and demanded investigations when they believed such events had occurred, he thinks that they had no such evidence in Gaines' case. He suggests that they believed that Gaines, whom they knew had grown resentful of the NAACP and his role in the lawsuit, had purposely dropped out of sight. Fifty years later, near the end of his own career as a Supreme Court justice, Thurgood Marshall recalled the case in terms that suggest this assessment: "The sonofabitch just never contacted us again."

In January 1940, the state of Missouri moved to dismiss the case due to the absence of the plaintiff. Houston and Redmond did not oppose the motion, and it was granted.

== Investigations ==
No law enforcement agency of the era formally investigated Gaines's disappearance; it had not been reported to any, and many African Americans distrusted the police. J. Edgar Hoover, director of the Federal Bureau of Investigation (FBI), who was more concerned about potential communist influence on the civil rights movement, wrote in an internal memo in 1940 that he did not believe the case fell under the FBI's jurisdiction.

With the onset of World War II, other concerns displaced the Gaines case for most of the 1940s. Later the FBI released a 1970 letter from Hoover to an unidentified member of the public, thanking them for their interest in the case but reiterating his position from 30 years earlier that he did not believe the FBI had any jurisdiction to investigate. Two media outlets looked into the case, a half-century apart: Ebony magazine, in the 1950s, and The Riverfront Times of St. Louis, in the 2000s.

=== Ebony ===
Ebony reporter Edward T. Clayton revisited Gaines and his disappearance in 1951; the Times described his article as the most thorough investigation of the case. Clayton retraced Gaines's movements in the months between the Supreme Court ruling and his trip to Chicago. Many persons who knew Gaines were still alive, such as family members in St. Louis and fraternity brothers in Chicago, and Clayton interviewed them.

Clayton found little new information. He drew a fuller portrait of Gaines that revealed the young man's disillusionment with his activist path. Callie Gaines, bedridden in her attic, shared her last conversation with her son. She said that both of them realized that he would not be following through and enrolling in the University of Missouri School of Law. She said that he had sent her a final postcard saying, "Goodbye. If you don't hear from me anymore you know I'll be all right." She had heard all the rumors about him turning up in Mexico or New York. "But nobody knows any more than we do." One of his sisters believed he was still alive. The family has never sought to have him declared legally dead.

Gaines's brother George, who had continued to loan his brother spending money at that time, said that when he disappeared, Gaines had owed him $500. He expressed bitterness that the NAACP had, in his opinion, exploited his brother. "That organization—the N-A-A-C-P or whatever it was—had him going around here making speeches," George Gaines told Clayton, "but when he got ready to go to Kansas City, I had to let him have $10 so he could get himself a white shirt." Sidney Redmond agreed that the Gaines family "doesn't seem too much concerned—and never was as I recall" about finding him, due to their resentment of the NAACP's role in pushing Lloyd Gaines into the public eye without adequately providing for or protecting him.

George provided Clayton with Lloyd's letters home, including the last one, written almost two weeks before he disappeared, in which he had lamented what he felt was a lack of support from fellow African Americans and said he wished he were just a regular, unknown person again. Like the postcard, it concludes by implying that he might be out of touch for a while.

In Chicago, Clayton talked to the Alpha Phi Alpha brothers among whom Gaines had spent his last known days and the Pages, his family friends from St. Louis. The former could offer little beyond clarifying the precise date of his disappearance and the duffel bag of dirty laundry he had left behind. Two who claimed Gaines had sent them postcards from Mexico were unable to corroborate their accounts by producing the postcards.

The Pages shared the details of Gaines's increasingly anxious state of mind in March 1939. Nancy Page said she had not inquired closely, out of respect for his privacy, but could tell something was bothering him. She reported a conversation with Gaines in which he was at best ambivalent about continuing the legal case and attending the University of Missouri School of Law. Clayton learned from her that Gaines had accepted a job, and found through his own research that Gaines had never started work there.

=== The Riverfront Times ===
In 2007 The Riverfront Times, St Louis's alternative weekly newspaper, revisited the case, well over 60 years after Gaines's disappearance. By that time Gaines had received posthumous honors. The FBI had accepted the case as the oldest of nearly a hundred civil-rights era disappearances referred to it for investigation by the NAACP. His immediate family and all others who had worked or socialized with him during that time had died. Reporter Chad Garrison spoke with George Gaines, a nephew of Lloyd's, and other, younger descendants. George was one of two surviving family members who had been alive when Lloyd disappeared, although he had only been an infant.

George Gaines said his family rarely spoke of Lloyd during his childhood in the 1940s, but when they did it was usually in positive terms. "Lloyd was always held in high regard as a person who set a positive example and stood up for what was right", he recalled. He had assumed that his uncle had died. He did not learn until reading the Ebony article that his uncle's fate was unknown.

While Garrison did not find any new facts about the disappearance itself or Gaines's time in Chicago, he found more direct evidence that Gaines might have fled to Mexico and lived out his life there. Sid Reedy, a University City librarian who had been an Alpha Phi Alpha brother at Lincoln University, told Garrison that he became fascinated by the case in the late 1970s. Reedy had sought out Lorenzo Greene, Gaines's mentor at Lincoln University and an esteemed civil rights activist and intellectual. Greene told Reedy that while on a visit to Mexico City in the late 1940s, he had made contact with Lloyd Gaines.

Greene, who died in 1988, claimed to have spoken on the telephone several times with Gaines, whose voice he recognized instantly. The two made plans to have dinner together, but Gaines did not show up. Greene told Reedy that Gaines had indeed "grown tired of the fight ... He had some business in Mexico City and apparently did well financially."

Garrison reported that Greene's son, Lorenzo Thomas Greene, said his father also told him of the encounter; the older man always hoped Gaines would return. But because of his experience with the FBI while active in the civil-rights movement during those years, Greene did not report his telephone contact with Gaines. "There wasn't a lot of trust there," said the son. "Even if my father went to them with that information, I really don't think they would have cared."

Some of Gaines's relatives were willing to accept that he lived out his life in Mexico, as opposed to the alternative scenarios. "It's better than being buried in a basement somewhere—Jimmy Hoffa style," said Paulette Mosby-Smith, one of Gaines's great-nieces. Others believe that would have been against his nature. "It's hard for me to believe that he went to Mexico and accepted a big payoff," George Gaines told Garrison. "That's not the same man who presented himself during the trial. I don't believe he would compromise his integrity like that." Another great-niece, Tracy Berry, who graduated from law school and became a federal prosecutor, agrees:

When you think of those old photos of lynchings and burned bodies, who wouldn't want to think that he lived a full life in Mexico? But based on the love my grandmother and great-grandmother had for their brother and son, that's really hard for me to reconcile. If he wanted to walk away, there are easier ways to do it than to sever ties from the entire family."

She has since told The New York Times that she believes her great-uncle was murdered.

== Legacy and honors ==
Although the family never had Lloyd Gaines declared legally dead, they erected a monument to him in 1999 in a Missouri cemetery. "His legacy didn't so much make me want to go to law school," says Tracy Berry. "But I think he did instill the legacy of education in our family. It's expected that you go to college. He started the fight that made it all possible."

In a December 1939 editorial, the Louisville Defender, that city's African-American newspaper, wrote:

"[W]hether Gaines has been bribed, intimidated or worse, should certainly have little permanent effect on the struggle for equal rights and social justice in connection with Negro education in the South ... [where] Negroes are already hammering upon the doors of graduate schools hitherto closed to them, with increasing persistence."

Thurgood Marshall later said, "I remember the Gaines case as one of our greatest legal victories." He had argued Brown v. Board of Education before the Supreme Court and was later that body's first African-American justice. He went on, "But I have never lost the pain of having so many people spend so much time and money on him, just to have him disappear."

Lavergne has noted that the Gaines ruling by the US Supreme Court "[made] constitutional compliance in the absence of integration difficult to achieve," even though the issue was not forced at the Missouri Supreme Court, and the separate but equal doctrine was not directly challenged. He cited three aspects of the Supreme Court decision to this point:

- First, the Court held that Gaines's right was "a personal and individual one." Gaines was entitled to go to law school regardless of how little demand there was in Missouri by African Americans for legal education.
- Second, the state could not meet its constitutional burden by sending students out of state. "With Gaines, the idea of using out-of-state scholarships to meet the test of separate but equal legally ended forever and everywhere in the United States," Lavergne says.
- Third, "the Court said that the promise of future equality ... did not make temporary discrimination constitutional."

Houston had hoped the effect of similar court rulings giving segregationist states a choice between full integration or duplication of programs for students of different races would lead many of them to choose the less expensive former option. But without Gaines, he could not carry through the next stage of his plan in the Missouri Supreme Court.

In the short term, the abrupt dismissal of the case forced by Gaines's disappearance was a setback for efforts to legally challenge segregation. After having spent $25,000 ($575,000 in current dollars) on the case, the NAACP had no money left. It could not support new plaintiffs, who were already difficult to find in the depressed economy. By the mid-1950s, the state closed Lincoln University School of Law, the only tangible result of the case, due to lack of students.

Houston was ill with the tuberculosis that would end his life a decade later. He resigned from the NAACP to return to private practice; Thurgood Marshall took over for him. In the first five years after the war, the NAACP found more plaintiffs and challenged segregationist policies in public graduate schools with cases such as Sipuel v. Board of Regents of Univ. of Okla., Sweatt v. Painter, and McLaurin v. Oklahoma State Regents. The University of Missouri School of Law, bowing to pressure from the student body, finally admitted its first African-American student in 1951. Three years later the desegregation effort climaxed with Brown, overturning Plessy v. Ferguson and the separate but equal doctrine.

=== At University of Missouri ===
In the years after Brown, when desegregation became a reality but tensions persisted and implementation proved difficult, Gaines's story became a cautionary tale at the University of Missouri. In a 2004 paper, LeeAnn Whites, a professor of Civil War history at the school, repeated a version in which Gaines had been on his way to enroll at the school as an undergraduate and had disappeared from a train traveling across the state, with the implication that he was murdered. Gerald M. Boyd, a St. Louis native and Pulitzer Prize-winning reporter for The New York Times, who was one of a few hundred black students at the University of Missouri in the early 1970s, recalls hearing Gaines's story early in his time there. He was also confronted by open displays of racial prejudice, such as the university's "Confederate Rock." "Whatever his fate," Boyd wrote in his memoirs, "in the eyes of blacks, the university bore the brunt of the blame."

The University of Missouri, and particularly the University of Missouri School of Law, began recognizing Gaines near the end of the 20th century, despite his never having been admitted. It established a scholarship in his name in 1995. In 2001, the school's African-American center was named for Gaines and another African American who had legally challenged the school's color bar early in the 20th century. A portrait of Gaines hangs in a prominent public place in the law school building.

In 2006 the law school posthumously awarded Gaines an honorary degree in law. The Supreme Court of Missouri, which had denied Gaines's admission almost 70 years before, and the state bar association, granted him an honorary posthumous law license. If Gaines were still alive and had reappeared (he would have turned 95 in 2006), he might have used those awards to practice law in Missouri.

== See also ==
- List of Alpha Phi Alpha brothers
- List of people who disappeared mysteriously: pre-1970
