= List of United States Supreme Court cases, volume 305 =

Supreme Court of the United States
- Interactive map of Supreme Court of the United States
- 38°53′26″N 77°00′16″W
- Established: March 4, 1789; 236 years ago
- Location: Washington, D.C.
- Coordinates: 38°53′26″N 77°00′16″W
- Composition method: Presidential nomination with Senate confirmation
- Authorised by: Constitution of the United States, Art. III, § 1
- Judge term length: life tenure, subject to impeachment and removal
- Number of positions: 9 (by statute)
- Website: supremecourt.gov

This is a list of cases reported in volume 305 of United States Reports, decided by the Supreme Court of the United States in 1938 and 1939.

== Justices of the Supreme Court at the time of volume 305 U.S. ==
The Supreme Court is established by Article III, Section 1 of the Constitution of the United States, which says: "The judicial Power of the United States, shall be vested in one supreme Court . . .". The size of the Court is not specified; the Constitution leaves it to Congress to set the number of justices. Under the Judiciary Act of 1789 Congress originally fixed the number of justices at six (one chief justice and five associate justices). Since 1789 Congress has varied the size of the Court from six to seven, nine, ten, and back to nine justices (always including one chief justice).

When the cases in volume 305 were decided the Court comprised the following eight members (Justice Cardozo had died in July 1938 and had not yet been replaced):

| Portrait | Justice | Office | Home State | Succeeded | Date confirmed by the Senate (Vote) | Tenure on Supreme Court |
|---|---|---|---|---|---|---|
| | Charles Evans Hughes | Chief Justice | New York | William Howard Taft | February 13, 1930 (52–26) | February 24, 1930 – June 30, 1941 (Retired) |
| | James Clark McReynolds | Associate Justice | Tennessee | Horace Harmon Lurton | August 29, 1914 (44–6) | October 12, 1914 – January 31, 1941 (Retired) |
| | Louis Brandeis | Associate Justice | Massachusetts | Joseph Rucker Lamar | June 1, 1916 (47–22) | June 5, 1916 – February 13, 1939 (Retired) |
| | Pierce Butler | Associate Justice | Minnesota | William R. Day | December 21, 1922 (61–8) | January 2, 1923 – November 16, 1939 (Died) |
| | Harlan F. Stone | Associate Justice | New York | Joseph McKenna | February 5, 1925 (71–6) | March 2, 1925 – July 2, 1941 (Continued as chief justice) |
| | Owen Roberts | Associate Justice | Pennsylvania | Edward Terry Sanford | May 20, 1930 (Acclamation) | June 2, 1930 – July 31, 1945 (Resigned) |
| | Hugo Black | Associate Justice | Alabama | Willis Van Devanter | August 17, 1937 (63–16) | August 19, 1937 – September 17, 1971 (Retired) |
| | Stanley Forman Reed | Associate Justice | Kentucky | George Sutherland | January 25, 1938 (Acclamation) | January 31, 1938 – February 25, 1957 (Retired) |

== Notable Cases in 305 U.S. ==
=== Kellogg Company v. National Biscuit Company ===
In Kellogg Company v. National Biscuit Company, 305 U.S. 111 (1938), the Supreme Court ruled that the Kellogg Company was not violating any trademark or unfair competition laws when it manufactured its own Shredded Wheat breakfast cereal, which had originally been invented by the National Biscuit Company (later called Nabisco). Kellogg's version of the product was of an essentially identical shape, and was also marketed as "Shredded Wheat"; but Nabisco's patents had expired, and its trademark application for the term "Shredded Wheat" had been turned down as a descriptive, non-trademarkable term. The Court therefore "forcefully applied the principle that once a patent has expired, its benefits are to be freely enjoyed by the public." Kellogg has been called possibly "the Supreme Court's most versatile and influential trademark decision." It had a direct impact on the structure of the Lanham Act and is a "routine starting point for analysis in trademark opinions in lower courts."

=== Missouri ex rel. Gaines v. Canada, Registrar of the University of Missouri ===
In Missouri ex rel. Gaines v. Canada, Registrar of the University of Missouri, 305 U.S. 337 (1938), the Supreme Court held that states that provided a law school to white students had to provide similar in-state education to blacks as well. States could satisfy this requirement by allowing blacks and whites to attend the same school or by creating a second school for blacks, but when the state provides legal training, it must provide it to every qualified person to satisfy equal protection. It can neither send them to other states, nor condition that training for one group of people, such as blacks, on levels of demand from that group. Key to the court's conclusion was that there was no provision for legal education of blacks in Missouri so Missouri law guaranteeing equal protection applied.

== Federal court system ==
Under the Judiciary Act of 1789 the federal court structure at the time comprised District Courts, which had general trial jurisdiction; Circuit Courts, which had mixed trial and appellate (from the US District Courts) jurisdiction; and the United States Supreme Court, which had appellate jurisdiction over the federal District and Circuit courts—and for certain issues over state courts. The Supreme Court also had limited original jurisdiction (i.e., in which cases could be filed directly with the Supreme Court without first having been heard by a lower federal or state court). There were one or more federal District Courts and/or Circuit Courts in each state, territory, or other geographical region.

The Judiciary Act of 1891 created the United States Courts of Appeals and reassigned the jurisdiction of most routine appeals from the district and circuit courts to these appellate courts. The Act created nine new courts that were originally known as the "United States Circuit Courts of Appeals." The new courts had jurisdiction over most appeals of lower court decisions. The Supreme Court could review either legal issues that a court of appeals certified or decisions of court of appeals by writ of certiorari. On January 1, 1912, the effective date of the Judicial Code of 1911, the old Circuit Courts were abolished, with their remaining trial court jurisdiction transferred to the U.S. District Courts.

== List of cases in volume 305 U.S. ==
| Case name | Citation | Opinion of the Court | Vote | Concurring opinion or statement | Dissenting opinion or statement | Procedural jurisdiction | Result |
|---|---|---|---|---|---|---|---|
| Great Northern Railroad Company v. Leonidas | 305 U.S. 1 (1938) | per curiam | 7-1 | none | Black (without opinion) | certiorari to the Montana Supreme Court (Mont.) | affirmed in part, and dismissed in part |
| Texas Consolidated Theatres, Inc. v. Pittman | 305 U.S. 3 (1938) | per curiam | 8-0 | none | none | certiorari to the United States Court of Appeals for the Fifth Circuit (5th Cir.) | certiorari dismissed |
| Polk Company v. Glover, County Solicitor | 305 U.S. 5 (1938) | per curiam | 7-1 | none | Black (opinion) | appeal from the United States District Court for the Southern District of Florida (S.D. Fla.) | reversed |
| Guarantee Trust Company v. Virginia | 305 U.S. 19 (1938) | McReynolds | 8-0 | none | none | certiorari to the Virginia Supreme Court (Va.) | affirmed |
| Colorado National Bank v. Commissioner of Internal Revenue | 305 U.S. 23 (1938) | McReynolds | 7-1 | Reed (short statement) | Black (opinion) | certiorari to the United States Court of Appeals for the Tenth Circuit (10th Cir.) | reversed |
| Davis v. Davis | 305 U.S. 32 (1938) | Butler | 8-0 | none | none | certiorari to the United States Court of Appeals for the District of Columbia (D.C. Cir.) | reversed |
| Davidson v. Commissioner of Internal Revenue | 305 U.S. 44 (1938) | Butler | 8-0 | none | none | certiorari to the United States Court of Appeals for the Eighth Circuit (8th Cir.) | affirmed |
| Schriber-Schroth Company v. Cleveland Trust Company | 305 U.S. 47 (1938) | Stone | 7-0[a] | none | none | certiorari to the United States Court of Appeals for the Sixth Circuit (6th Cir.) | reversed |
| Stahmann v. Vidal, Collector of Internal Revenue | 305 U.S. 61 (1938) | Roberts | 7-0[b] | none | none | certiorari to the United States Court of Appeals for the Tenth Circuit (10th Cir.) | reversed |
| Sovereign Camp of Woodmen v. Bolin | 305 U.S. 66 (1938) | Roberts | 8-0 | none | none | certiorari to the Missouri Court of Appeals (Mo. Ct. App.) | reversed |
| Helvering, Commissioner of Internal Revenue v. Winmill | 305 U.S. 79 (1938) | Black | 8-0 | none | none | certiorari to the United States Court of Appeals for the Second Circuit (2d Cir.) | reversed |
| Hines, Administrator of Veterans' Affairs v. Lowrey | 305 U.S. 85 (1938) | Black | 8-0 | none | none | certiorari to the New York Supreme Court (N.Y. Sup. Ct.) | reversed |
| Waialua Agricultural Company v. Christian | 305 U.S. 91 (1938) | Reed | 8-0 | none | none | certiorari to the United States Court of Appeals for the Ninth Circuit (9th Cir.) | reversed |
| Kellogg Company v. National Biscuit Company | 305 U.S. 111 (1938) | Brandeis | 6-2 | none | McReynolds and Butler (joint short statement) | certiorari to the United States Court of Appeals for the Third Circuit (3d Cir.) | reversed |
| General Talking Pictures Corporation v. Western Electric Company | 305 U.S. 124 (1938) | Brandeis | 5-2[a] | none | Black (opinion; joined by Reed) | certiorari to the United States Court of Appeals for the Second Circuit (2d Cir.) | affirmed |
| Welch v. Henry | 305 U.S. 134 (1938) | Stone | 5-3 | none | Roberts (opinion; joined by McReynolds and Butler) | appeal from the Wisconsin Supreme Court (Wis.) | affirmed |
| Harris v. Avery Brundage Company | 305 U.S. 160 (1938) | Black | 8-0 | none | none | certiorari to the United States Court of Appeals for the Seventh Circuit (7th Cir.) | affirmed |
| Stoll v. Gottlieb | 305 U.S. 165 (1938) | Reed | 8-0 | McReynolds (without opinion) | none | certiorari to the Illinois Supreme Court (Ill.) | reversed |
| Shields v. Utah Idaho Central Railroad Company | 305 U.S. 177 (1938) | Hughes | 8-0 | Black (without opinion) | none | certiorari to the United States Court of Appeals for the Tenth Circuit (10th Cir.) | reversed |
| Lyeth v. Hoey, Collector of Internal Revenue | 305 U.S. 188 (1938) | Hughes | 8-0 | none | none | certiorari to the United States Court of Appeals for the Second Circuit (2d Cir.) | reversed |
| Consolidated Edison Company v. National Labor Relations Board | 305 U.S. 197 (1938) | Hughes | 8-0 | Butler (opinion, concurring in part and dissenting in part; with which McReynolds concurred); Reed (opinion, concurring in part and dissenting in part; with which Black concurred) | none | certiorari to the United States Court of Appeals for the Second Circuit (2d Cir.) | affirmed as modified |
| Scher v. United States | 305 U.S. 251 (1938) | McReynolds | 8-0 | none | none | certiorari to the United States Court of Appeals for the Sixth Circuit (6th Cir.) | affirmed |
| California v. Latimer | 305 U.S. 255 (1938) | Brandeis | 8-0 | none | none | original jurisdiction | bill dismissed |
| McDonald v. Thompson | 305 U.S. 263 (1938) | Butler | 8-0 | none | none | certiorari to the United States Court of Appeals for the Fifth Circuit (5th Cir.) | affirmed |
| M.E. Blatt Company v. United States | 305 U.S. 267 (1938) | Butler | 8-0 | Stone (short statement) | none | certiorari to the United States Court of Claims (Ct. Cl.) | reversed |
| White v. United States | 305 U.S. 281 (1938) | Stone | 5-3 | none | McReynolds, Butler, and Robert (without opinions) | certiorari to the United States Court of Claims (Ct. Cl.) | affirmed |
| Helvering, Commissioner of Internal Revenue v. Chester N. Weaver Company | 305 U.S. 293 (1938) | Stone | 5-3 | none | McReynolds, Butler, and Robert (without opinions) | certiorari to the United States Court of Appeals for the Ninth Circuit (9th Cir.) | affirmed |
| Neblett v. Carpenter, Insurance Commissioner | 305 U.S. 297 (1938) | Roberts | 7-0[b] | none | none | certiorari to the California Supreme Court (Cal.) | affirmed |
| Inter-Island Steam Navigation Company v. Hawaii | 305 U.S. 306 (1938) | Black | 8-0 | none | none | certiorari to the United States Court of Appeals for the Ninth Circuit (9th Cir.) | affirmed |
| Armstrong Paint and Varnish Works v. Nu-Enamel Corporation | 305 U.S. 315 (1938) | Reed | 8-0 | none | none | certiorari to the United States Court of Appeals for the Seventh Circuit (7th Cir.) | affirmed |
| Missouri ex rel. Gaines v. Canada, Registrar of the University of Missouri | 305 U.S. 337 (1938) | Hughes | 6-2 | none | McReynolds (opinion; with which Butler concurred) | certiorari to the Missouri Supreme Court (Mo.) | reversed |
| Ex parte Century Indemnity Company | 305 U.S. 354 (1938) | per curiam | 8-0 | none | none | appeal from the United States Court of Appeals for the Ninth Circuit (9th Cir.) | show-cause rule discharged |
| United States v. Pleasants | 305 U.S. 357 (1939) | Hughes | 8-0 | none | none | certiorari to the United States Court of Claims (Ct. Cl.) | affirmed |
| Ford Motor Company v. National Labor Relations Board | 305 U.S. 364 (1939) | Hughes | 7-0[a] | none | none | certiorari to the United States Court of Appeals for the Sixth Circuit (6th Cir.) | affirmed (one case); certiorari dismissed (one case) |
| Patterson v. Stanolind Oil and Gas Company | 305 U.S. 376 (1939) | per curiam | 8-0 | none | none | appeal from the Oklahoma Supreme Court (Okla.) | dismissed |
| J. Bacon and Sons v. Martin | 305 U.S. 380 (1939) | per curiam | 8-0 | none | none | appeal from the Kentucky Court of Appeals (Ky.) | dismissed |
| Minnesota v. United States | 305 U.S. 382 (1939) | Brandeis | 8-0 | none | none | certiorari to the United States Court of Appeals for the Eighth Circuit (8th Cir.) | affirmed |
| Indianapolis Brewing Company v. Liquor Control Commission of Michigan | 305 U.S. 391 (1939) | Brandeis | 8-0 | none | none | appeal from the United States District Court for the Eastern District of Michigan (E.D. Michigan) | affirmed |
| Joseph S. Finch and Company v. McKittrick, Attorney General of Missouri | 305 U.S. 395 (1939) | Brandeis | 8-0 | none | none | appeal from the United States District Court for the Western District of Missouri (W.D. Mo.) | affirmed |
| United States v. Continental National Bank and Trust Company | 305 U.S. 398 (1939) | Butler | 6-2 | none | Stone (opinion; with which Black concurred) | certiorari to the United States Court of Appeals for the Seventh Circuit (7th Cir.) | affirmed |
| James v. United Artists Corporation | 305 U.S. 410 (1939) | Stone | 8-0 | none | none | appeal from the United States District Court for the Southern District of West Virginia (S.D.W. Va.) | affirmed |
| United States v. Algoma Lumber Company | 305 U.S. 415 (1939) | Stone | 6-0[a][c] | none | none | certiorari to the United States Court of Claims (Ct. Cl.) | reversed |
| Socony-Vacuum Oil Company v. Smith | 305 U.S. 424 (1939) | Stone | 6-1[a] | none | McReynolds (short statement) | certiorari to the United States Court of Appeals for the Second Circuit (2d Cir.) | affirmed |
| Gwin, White and Prince, Inc. v. Henneford | 305 U.S. 434 (1939) | Stone | 7-1 | Butler (opinion; joined by McReynolds) | Black (opinion) | appeal from the Washington Supreme Court (Wash.) | reversed |
| Princess Lida of Thurn and Taxis v. Thompson | 305 U.S. 456 (1939) | Roberts | 8-0 | none | none | certiorari to the Pennsylvania Supreme Court (Pa.) | affirmed |
| Helvering, Commissioner of Internal Revenue v. Owens | 305 U.S. 468 (1939) | Roberts | 8-0 | none | none | certiorari to the United States Court of Appeals for the Second Circuit (2d Cir.) | affirmed (one case); reversed (one case) |
| United States v. McClure | 305 U.S. 472 (1939) | Black | 8-0 | none | none | certiorari to the United States Court of Appeals for the Ninth Circuit (9th Cir.) | affirmed |
| Chippewa Indians of Minnesota v. United States | 305 U.S. 479 (1939) | Black | 8-0 | none | none | appeal from the United States Court of Claims (Ct. Cl.) | affirmed |
| Lyon v. Mutual Beneficial Health and Accident Association | 305 U.S. 484 (1939) | Black | 5-2[a] | none | Butler (short statement; joined by McReynolds) | certiorari to the United States Court of Appeals for the Eighth Circuit (8th Cir.) | reversed |
| Connecticut Railway and Lighting Company v. Palmer | 305 U.S. 493 (1939) | Reed | 6-1[d] | none | McReynolds (without opinion) | certiorari to the United States Court of Appeals for the Second Circuit (2d Cir.) | reversed |
| Baltimore and Ohio Railroad Company v. United States | 305 U.S. 507 (1939) | Reed | 8-0 | none | none | appeal from the United States District Court for the Southern District of New York (S.D.N.Y.) | affirmed |
| United States v. Powers | 305 U.S. 527 (1939) | McReynolds | 7-0[b] | none | none | certiorari to the United States Court of Appeals for the Ninth Circuit (9th Cir.) | affirmed |
| Pullman Company v. Jenkins | 305 U.S. 534 (1939) | Hughes | 7-0[a] | Black (opinion) | none | certiorari to the United States Court of Appeals for the Ninth Circuit (9th Cir.) | affirmed |
| Alton Railroad Company v. Illinois Commerce Commission | 305 U.S. 548 (1939) | Butler | 7-0[a] | none | Black (without opinion) | appeal from the Illinois Supreme Court (Ill.) | affirmed |

[a] Roberts took no part in the case
[b] Reed took no part in the case
[c] McReynolds took no part in the case
[d] Brandeis took no part in the case
