= Kellogg Co. v. National Biscuit Co. =

- Supreme Court of the United States

Argued October 10, 1938 Decided November 14, 1938
- Full case name: Kellogg Co. v. National Biscuit Co.
- Citations: 305 U.S. 111 (more) 59 S. Ct. 109; 83 L. Ed. 73; 1938 U.S. LEXIS 1137

Case history
- Prior: Case dismissed in favor of defendant, Delaware district court, 1935; dismissal upheld, Circuit Court of Appeals, 1936; upon rehearing, dismissal vacated and mandate sent to district court, Circuit Court of Appeals, 1936; certiorari denied, U.S. Supreme Court (302 U.S. 733, 58 S.Ct. 120); injunction entered per mandate in favor of plaintiff, 1938, Delaware district court; mandate "clarified", Circuit Court of Appeals, 1938; certiorari granted, U.S. Supreme Court, 304 U.S. 586, 58 S.Ct. 1052.

Holding
- After a patent expires or becomes invalid, the patent holder cannot use unfair competition law to prevent a rival from selling goods of the same shape under the same (non-trademarked) name.

Court membership
- Chief Justice Charles E. Hughes Associate Justices James C. McReynolds · Louis Brandeis; Pierce Butler · Harlan F. Stone; Owen Roberts · Hugo Black; Stanley F. Reed

Case opinions
- Majority: Brandeis, joined by Hughes, Stone, Roberts, Black, Reed
- Dissent: McReynolds, joined by Butler

Kellogg Co. v. National Biscuit Co., 305 U.S. 111 (1938), is a United States Supreme Court case in which the Court ruled that the Kellogg Company was not violating any trademark or unfair competition laws when it manufactured its own Shredded Wheat breakfast cereal, which had originally been invented by the National Biscuit Company (later called Nabisco). Kellogg's version of the product was of an essentially identical shape, and was also marketed as "Shredded Wheat"; but Nabisco's patents had expired, and its trademark application for the term "Shredded Wheat" had been turned down as a descriptive, non-trademarkable term.

The Court therefore "forcefully applied the principle that once a patent has expired, its benefits are to be freely enjoyed by the public." Kellogg has been called possibly "the Supreme Court's most versatile and influential trademark decision." It had a direct impact on the structure of the Lanham Act and is a "routine starting point for analysis in trademark opinions in lower courts."

== Background ==
Inventor Henry Perky developed a shredded wheat machine and introduced the cereal in 1893; he was issued utility patents in 1895 on both the shredded wheat and on the machine. John Kellogg tasted a sample and commented that they were like "eating a whisk broom." Nevertheless, the cereal became successful, and Perky's company, the Shredded Wheat Company, continued to manufacture the product after he retired.

The Kellogg Company started manufacturing shredded wheat cereal in 1912 after Perky's patents expired; after the Shredded Wheat Company objected, Kellogg stopped manufacturing their version in 1919. The nature of the settlement is not clear. In 1927, the Kellogg Company resumed manufacturing shredded wheat, prompting a lawsuit from the Shredded Wheat Company; the lawsuit was settled. In 1930, the Shredded Wheat Company was acquired by the National Biscuit Company (later Nabisco), which again sued Kellogg, both in Canada and in the United States, for unfair competition.

Nabisco complained in its lawsuit about Kellogg's use of the term "Shredded Wheat"; the similarity of its cereal biscuits' shape to the Nabisco cereal biscuits; and Kellogg's use on the product box of a picture of two of the pillow-shaped cereal biscuits submerged in milk. The complaint about the picture was based on trademark law; the other two complaints were that Kellogg's was fraudulently trying to "pass off" its cereal as Nabisco's. Nabisco had previously failed in its attempt to register "Shredded Wheat" as a trademark, as the U.S. Patent and Trademark Office had rejected the registration, as descriptive.

== Opinion of the Court ==
In a 6–2 opinion written by Justice Brandeis, the U.S. Supreme Court rejected Nabisco's arguments, and allowed Kellogg to continue to manufacture its shredded wheat cereal, and name it "Shredded Wheat".

On the protection of the cereal's shape, the Court decided that the shape was functional and that there was a right to copy it after its patent expired, as the use of unfair competition and trademark laws could otherwise be used to impede the ability of rivals to create any competitive product, even though the patent had expired.

On the picture of the two shredded wheat biscuits in the bowl of milk, the Court noted that "the name Kellogg was so prominent on all of the defendant's cartons as to minimize the possibility of confusion", and hence there was no fraudulent "passing off" of Kellogg's cereal biscuits as having been created by Nabisco.

On the use of the term "Shredded Wheat", the Court ruled that the term was generic and not trademarkable; and dismissed a claim by Nabisco that it had acquired a "secondary meaning" under case law.

The Court concluded:

Kellogg Company is undoubtedly sharing in the goodwill of the article known as 'Shredded Wheat'; and thus is sharing in a market which was created by the skill and judgment of plaintiff's predecessor and has been widely extended by vast expenditures in advertising persistently made. But that is not unfair. Sharing in the goodwill of an article unprotected by patent or trade-mark is the exercise of a right possessed by all - and in the free exercise of which the consuming public is deeply interested.

Justice McReynolds and Justice Butler dissented, writing that Kellogg was "fraudulently seeking to appropriate to itself the benefits of a goodwill built up at great cost by the respondent", which should be viewed as illegal.

== Subsequent developments ==
Kellogg has become a foundation of the functionality doctrine, that product designs that are intrinsic to functionality cannot be protected under unfair competition or trademark laws, because this would impede the ability of competitors to make a rival product.

Trademark law was in a state of flux in 1938, when Kellogg was decided, and the U.S. Department of Justice sought to explicitly codify the Kellogg decision into law, as part of the Lanham Act.

One commentator maintained that one could properly—

...view Kellogg as vindication of the views that he [Brandeis] expressed in INS [v. AP]. That Nabisco had invested in the shredded wheat product did not give it control over the use of the pillow shape (or the term SHREDDED WHEAT); it had no property right against misappropriation of the shape after the expiry of the patents. Instead, Brandeis inquired [only] whether Kellogg had engaged in any acts of misrepresentation.

== See also ==
- Attorney General of Quebec v. Kellogg's Co. of Canada
