= Estate tax in the United States =

Tax on the transfer of the property of a deceased person

In the United States, the estate tax is a federal tax on the transfer of the estate of a person who dies. The tax applies to property that is transferred by will or, if the person has no will, according to state laws of intestacy. Other transfers that are subject to the tax can include those made through a trust and the payment of certain life insurance benefits or financial accounts. The estate tax is part of the federal unified gift and estate tax in the United States. The other part of the system, the gift tax, applies to transfers of property during a person's life.

In addition to the federal government, 12 states tax the estate of the deceased. Six states have "inheritance taxes" levied on the person who receives money or property from the estate of the deceased.

The estate tax is periodically the subject of political debate. Some opponents have called it the "death tax" while some supporters have called it the "Paris Hilton tax".

There are many exceptions and exemptions that reduce the number of estates with tax liability: in 2021, only 2,584 estates paid a positive federal estate tax. If an asset is left to a spouse or a federally recognized charity, the tax usually does not apply. In addition, a maximum amount, varying year by year, can be given by an individual, before and/or upon their death, without incurring federal gift or estate taxes: $5,340,000 for estates of persons dying in 2014 and 2015, $5,450,000 (effectively $10.90 million per married couple, assuming the deceased spouse did not leave assets to the surviving spouse) for estates of persons dying in 2016. Because of these exemptions, it is estimated that only the largest 0.2% of estates in the U.S. will pay the tax. For 2017, the exemption increased to $5.49 million. In 2018, the exemption doubled to $11.18 million per taxpayer due to the Tax Cuts and Jobs Act of 2017. As a result, about 3,200 estates were affected by this 2018 increase and were not liable for federal estate tax.

The current individual exemption in 2024 is $13.61 million, or $27.22 million for a married couple.

== Federal estate tax ==
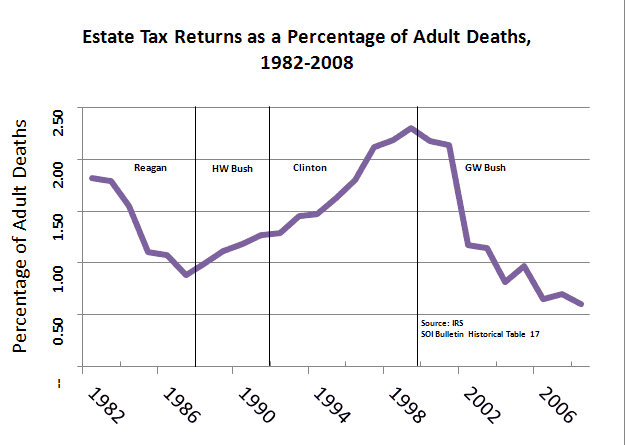
Estate tax returns as a percentage of adult deaths, 1982–2008.

The federal estate tax is imposed "on the transfer of the taxable estate of every decedent who is a citizen or resident of the United States."

Year	Number of estate tax returns	Tax filings as a percentage of adult deaths
1934	8,655	0.88%
1976	139,115	7.65%
1982	34,426	1.81%
1999	53,819	2.30%
2001	50,456	2.14%
2003	27,309	1.14%
2008	14,626	0.60%
2009	5,668	0.24%
2010	0 (Repealed)	
2011	4,415	0.18%
2019	2,129	0.08%

Federal estate taxes give very wealthy families incentives to transfer resources directly to distant generations in order to avoid taxes on successive rounds of transfers. Until recently such transfers were impeded by the rule against perpetuities, which prevented transfers to most potential not-yet-born beneficiaries. Many American states have repealed the rule against perpetuities, raising concerns that the combination of tax incentives and new legal rights encourages the devotion of vast wealth to perpetual trusts designed to benefit distant generations, avoid taxes, and maintain a degree of control over the financial affairs of descendants in perpetuity.

One of the major concerns that motivate estate planning is the potential burden of federal taxes, which apply both to gifts during lifetime and to transfers at death. In practice, only a small fraction of U.S. estates is taxable, reflecting that exemption levels are high and transfers to surviving spouses are entirely excluded from taxable estates; but those estates that are subject to federal taxation typically face high rates. Taxpayers commonly arrange their affairs to soften the impact of federal taxation.

The starting point in the calculation is the "gross estate". Certain deductions from the "gross estate" are allowed to arrive at the "taxable estate".

=== The "gross estate" ===
The "gross estate" for federal estate tax purposes often includes more property than that included in the "probate estate" under the property laws of the state in which the decedent lived at the time of death. The gross estate (before the modifications) may be considered to be the value of all the property interests of the decedent at the time of death. To these interests are added the following property interests generally not owned by the decedent at the time of death:

- the value of property to the extent of an interest held by the surviving spouse as a "dower or curtesy";
- the value of certain items of property in which the decedent had, at any time, made a transfer during the three years immediately preceding the date of death (i.e., even if the property was no longer owned by the decedent on the date of death), other than certain gifts, and other than property sold for full value;
- the value of certain property transferred by the decedent before death for which the decedent retained a "life estate", or retained certain "powers";
- the value of certain property in which the recipient could, through ownership, have possession or enjoyment only by surviving the decedent;
- the value of certain property in which the decedent retained a "reversionary interest", the value of which exceeded five percent of the value of the property;
- the value of certain property transferred by the decedent before death where the transfer was revocable;
- the value of certain annuities;
- the value of certain jointly owned property, such as assets passing by operation of law or survivorship, i.e. joint tenants with rights of survivorship or tenants by the entirety, with special rules for assets owned jointly by spouses.;
- the value of certain "powers of appointment";
- the amount of proceeds of certain life insurance policies.

The above list of modifications is not comprehensive.

As noted above, life insurance benefits may be included in the gross estate (even though the proceeds arguably were not "owned" by the decedent and were never received by the decedent). Life insurance proceeds are generally included in the gross estate if the benefits are payable to the estate, or if the decedent was the owner of the life insurance policy or had any "incidents of ownership" over the life insurance policy (such as the power to change the beneficiary designation). Similarly, bank accounts or other financial instruments which are "payable on death" or "transfer on death" are usually included in the taxable estate, even though such assets are not subject to the probate process under state law.

=== Deductions and the taxable estate ===
Once the value of the "gross estate" is determined, the law provides for various deductions (in Part IV of Subchapter A of Chapter 11 of Subtitle B of the Internal Revenue Code) in arriving at the value of the "taxable estate." Deductions include but are not limited to:

- Funeral expenses, administration expenses, and claims against the estate;
- Certain charitable contributions;
- Certain items of property left to the surviving spouse.
- Beginning in 2005, inheritance or estate taxes paid to states or the District of Columbia.

Of these deductions, the most important is the deduction for property passing to (or in certain kinds of trust, for) the surviving spouse, because it can eliminate any federal estate tax for a married decedent. However, this unlimited deduction does not apply if the surviving spouse (not the decedent) is not a U.S. citizen. A special trust called a Qualified Domestic Trust or QDOT must be used to obtain an unlimited marital deduction for otherwise disqualified spouses.

=== Tentative tax ===
The tentative tax is based on the tentative tax base, which is the sum of the taxable estate and the "adjusted taxable gifts" (i.e., taxable gifts made after 1976). For decedents dying after December 31, 2009, the tentative tax will, with exceptions, be calculated by applying the following tax rates:

Lower limit	Upper limit	Cumulated tax payable	Tax rate between limit
0	$10,000	$0	18% of the amount
$10,000	$20,000	$1,800	20% of the excess
$20,000	$40,000	$3,800	22% of the excess
$40,000	$60,000	$8,200	24% of the excess
$60,000	$80,000	$13,000	26% of the excess
$80,000	$100,000	$18,200	28% of the excess
$100,000	$150,000	$23,800	30% of the excess
$150,000	$250,000	$38,800	32% of the excess
$250,000	$500,000	$70,800	34% of the excess
$500,000	$750,000	$155,800	37% of the excess
$750,000	$1,000,000	$248,300	39% of the excess
$1,000,000	and over	$345,800	40% of the excess

The tentative tax is reduced by gift tax that would have been paid on the adjusted taxable gifts, based on the rates in effect on the date of death (which means that the reduction is not necessarily equal to the gift tax actually paid on those gifts).

=== Credits against tax ===
There are several credits against the tentative tax, the most important of which is a "unified credit" which can be thought of as providing for an "exemption equivalent" or exempted value with respect to the sum of the taxable estate and the taxable gifts during lifetime.

For a person dying during 2006, 2007, or 2008, the "applicable exclusion amount" is $2,000,000, so if the sum of the taxable estate plus the "adjusted taxable gifts" made during lifetime equals $2,000,000 or less, there is no federal estate tax to pay. According to the Economic Growth and Tax Relief Reconciliation Act of 2001, the applicable exclusion increased to $3,500,000 in 2009, and the estate tax was repealed for estates of decedents dying in 2010, but then the Act was to "sunset" in 2011 and the estate tax was to reappear with an applicable exclusion amount of only $1,000,000.

The Tax Relief, Unemployment Insurance Reauthorization, and Job Creation Act of 2010 became law on December 17, 2010. The 2010 Act changed, among other things, the rate structure for estates of decedents dying after December 31, 2009, subject to certain exceptions. It also served to reunify the estate tax credit (aka exemption equivalent) with the federal gift tax credit (aka exemption equivalent). The gift tax exemption is equal to $5,250,000 for estates of decedents dying in 2013, and $5,340,000 for estates of decedents dying in 2014.

The 2010 Act also provided portability to the credit, allowing a surviving spouse to use that portion of the pre-deceased spouse's credit that was not previously used (e.g. a husband died, used $3 million of his credit, and filed an estate tax return. At his wife's subsequent death, she can use her $5 million credit plus the remaining $2 million of her husband's). If the estate includes property that was inherited from someone else within the preceding 10 years, and there was estate tax paid on that property, there may also be a credit for property previously taxed.

Because of these exemptions, only the largest 0.2% of estates in the US will have to pay any estate tax.

Before 2005, there was also a credit for non-federal estate taxes, but that credit was phased out by the Economic Growth and Tax Relief Reconciliation Act of 2001.

=== Portability ===
The Tax Relief, Unemployment Insurance Reauthorization, and Job Creation Act of 2010 authorizes the personal representative of estates of decedents dying on or after January 1, 2011, to elect to transfer any unused estate tax exclusion amount to the surviving spouse, in a concept known as portability. The amount received by the surviving spouse is called the deceased spousal unused exclusion, or DSUE, amount. If the personal representative of the decedent's estate elects transfer, or portability, of the DSUE amount, the surviving spouse may apply the DSUE amount received from the estate of his or her last deceased spouse against any tax liability arising from subsequent lifetime gifts and transfers at death. The portability exemption is claimed by filing Form 706, specifically Part 6 of the estate tax return. Whether the personal representative has an obligation to make the portability election is presently unclear.

=== Requirements for filing return and paying tax ===
For estates larger than the current federally exempted amount, any estate tax due is paid by the executor, other person responsible for administering the estate, or the person in possession of the decedent's property. That person is also responsible for filing a Form 706 return with the Internal Revenue Service (IRS). In addition, the form must be filed if the decedent's spouse wishes to claim any of the decedent's remaining estate/gift tax exemption.

The return must contain detailed information as to the valuations of the estate assets and the exemptions claimed, to ensure that the correct amount of tax is paid. The deadline for filing the Form 706 is 9 months from the date of the decedent's death. The payment may be extended, but not to exceed 12 months, but the return must be filed by the 9-month deadline.

=== Exemptions and tax rates ===
Year	Exclusion amount	Max/top tax rate
1981	$175,000	70%
1982	$225,000	65%
1983	$275,000	60%
1984	$325,000	55%
1985	$400,000	55%
1986	$500,000	55%
1987	$600,000	55%
1998	$625,000	55%
1999	$650,000	55%
2000	$675,000	55%
2001	$675,000	55%
2002	$1 million	50%
2003	$1 million	49%
2004	$1.5 million	48%
2005	$1.5 million	47%
2006	$2 million	46%
2007	$2 million	45%
2008	$2 million	45%
2009	$3.5 million	45%
2010	Repealed	
2011	$5 million	35%
2012	$5.12 million	35%
2013	$5.25 million	40%
2014	$5.34 million	40%
2015	$5.43 million	40%
2016	$5.45 million	40%
2017	$5.49 million	40%
2018	$11.18 million	40%
2019	$11.4 million	40%
2020	$11.58 million	40%
2021	$11.7 million	40%
2022	$12.06 million	40%
2023	$12.92 million	40%
2024	$13.61 million	40%
2025	$13.99 million	40%
2026	$15 million	40%

As noted above, a certain amount of each estate is exempted from taxation by the law. Below is a table of the amount of exemption by year an estate would expect. Estates above these amounts would be subject to estate tax, but only for the amount above the exemption.

For example, assume an estate of $3.5 million in 2006. There are two beneficiaries who will each receive equal shares of the estate. The maximum allowable credit is $2 million for that year, so the taxable value is therefore $1.5 million. Since it is 2006, the tax rate on that $1.5 million is 46%, so the total taxes paid would be $690,000. Each beneficiary will receive $1,000,000 of untaxed inheritance and $405,000 from the taxable portion of their inheritance for a total of $1,405,000. This means the estate would have paid a taxable rate of 19.7%.

As shown below, the 2001 tax act would have repealed the estate tax for one year (2010) and would then have readjusted it in 2011 to the year 2002 exemption level with a 2001 top rate. The estate of a person who died in the year 2010 would have been entirely exempt from tax while that of a person who died in the year 2011 or later would have been taxed as heavily as in 2001. On December 17, 2010, Congress passed the Tax Relief, Unemployment Insurance Reauthorization, and Job Creation Act of 2010. Section 301 of the 2010 Act temporarily adjusted the federal estate tax. The 2010 Act set the exemption for U.S. citizens and residents at $5 million per person, and set 35 percent as the top tax rate for the years 2011 and 2012.

On January 1, 2013, the American Taxpayer Relief Act of 2012 was passed permanently establishing an exemption of $5 million (in 2011 dollars adjusted for inflation) per person for U.S. citizens and residents, and a maximum tax rate of 40% for the year 2013 and beyond.

The 2012 Act again included a sunset provision to make its effect impermanent. The fiscal year 2014 budget called for returning the estate tax exclusion, the generation-skipping transfer tax and the gift-tax exemption to the 2009 level, $3.5 million, in 2018. The exemption amounts set by the Tax Cuts and Jobs Act of 2017, $11,180,000 for 2018 and $11,400,000 for 2019 again have a sunset and will expire 12/31/2025

=== Puerto Rico and other U.S. possessions ===
A decedent who became a U.S. citizen because of their connection with a U.S. territory and who was resident at the time of death in a U.S. territory (e.g. Puerto Rico, Guam, American Samoa, etc.) is treated, for federal tax purposes, as though he or she were a nonresident who is not a citizen of the United States. The federal estate tax does not apply to such a person's estate. A person who became a U.S. citizen otherwise even though resident in a U.S. territory at the time of death is subject to estate tax. For U.S. estate tax purposes, a U.S. resident is someone domiciled in one of the United States or the District of Columbia at the time of death. A person is domiciled in a place by living there, for even a brief period of time, with no intention of moving from that place.

=== Non-residents ===
The $11.2 million exemption specified in the Acts of 2010 and 2012 (cited above) applies only to U.S. citizens or residents, not to non-resident aliens or foreigners. Non-resident aliens and foreigners have a $60,000 exclusion instead, although this amount may be higher if a gift and estate tax treaty applies.

For estate tax purposes, the test determining who is a non-resident alien is different from the one for income tax purposes. The inquiry centers around the decedent's domicile. This is a subjective test that looks primarily at intent. The test considers factors such as the length of stay in the United States; frequency of travel, size, and cost of home in the United States; location of family; participation in community activities; participation in U.S. business and ownership of assets in the United States; and voting. A foreigner can be a U.S. resident for income tax purposes, but not be domiciled for estate tax purposes.

A non-resident alien is subject to a different regime for estate tax than U.S. citizens and residents. The estate tax is imposed only on the part of the gross non-resident alien's estate that at the time of death is situated in the United States. These rules may be ameliorated by an estate tax treaty. The U.S. does not maintain as many estate tax treaties as income tax treaties, but there are estate tax treaties in place with many of the major European countries, Canada, Australia, and Japan.

U.S. real estate owned by a non-resident alien through a foreign corporation is not included in a non-resident alien's estate. The corporation must have a business purpose and activity, lest it be deemed a sham designed to avoid U.S. estate taxes.

In principle, all foreigners holding U.S. property are subject to the estate tax, even if they have never set foot in the U.S. and hold U.S. stocks directly only through a foreign brokerage account. In such cases, the estate should file Form 706-NA with the IRS within nine months of the date of death to be assured of avoiding penalties. This applies even if a foreigner is in a country that has entered into a tax treaty with the U.S. Filing of Form 706-NA by the deadline is required to take advantage of the provisions of the tax treaty, although the estate may also file for a six-month extension using Form 4768, or the Form 706-NA may in some cases be accepted late with reasonable cause. In practice, however, enforcement of this rule is spotty. For example, Canadian brokerages will normally allow U.S. stocks to be transferred to control of the estate trustee and to be liquidated without the estate presenting a U.S. transfer certificate or a U.S. tax closing letter.

=== Noncitizen spouse ===
The estate tax of a deceased spouse depends on the citizenship of the surviving spouse.

All property held jointly with a surviving noncitizen spouse is considered to belong entirely to the gross estate of the deceased, except for the extent the executor can substantiate the contributions of the noncitizen surviving spouse to the acquisition of the property.

U.S. citizens with a noncitizen spouse do not benefit from the same marital deductions as those with a U.S. citizen spouse.

Furthermore, the estate tax exemption is not portable among spouses if one of the spouses is a noncitizen.

== Estate and inheritance taxes at the state level ==
Currently, fifteen states and the District of Columbia have an estate tax, and six states have an inheritance tax. Maryland has both. Some states exempt estates at the federal level. Other states impose tax at lower levels; New Jersey estate tax was abolished for deaths after Jan 1, 2018.

In states that impose an inheritance tax, the tax rate depends on the status of the person receiving the property, and in some jurisdictions, how much they receive. Inheritance taxes are paid not by the estate of the deceased, but by the inheritors of the estate. For example, the Kentucky inheritance tax "is a tax on the right to receive property from a decedent's estate; both tax and exemptions are based on the relationship of the beneficiary to the decedent."

For decedents dying in calendar year 2014, 12 states (Connecticut, Delaware, Hawaii, Illinois, Maine, Massachusetts, Minnesota, New York, Oregon, Rhode Island, Vermont, and Washington) and the District of Columbia impose only estate taxes. Delaware and Hawaii allowed their taxes to expire after Congress repealed the credit for state estate taxes, but reenacted the taxes in 2010. Exemption amounts under the state estate taxes vary, ranging from the federal estate tax exemption amount or $5.34 million, indexed for inflation (two states) to $675,000 (New Jersey). The most common amount is $1 million (three states and the District of Columbia). In 2014, four states increased their exemption amounts: Minnesota (phased up to $2 million for 2018 deaths), Rhode Island ($1.5 million for 2015 deaths), and Maryland and New York (both phased their exemptions up to the federal amount for 2019 deaths). Top rates range from 12 percent to 19 percent with most states, like Minnesota, imposing a top rate of 16 percent.

Five states (Iowa, Kentucky, Nebraska, New Jersey, and Pennsylvania) impose only inheritance taxes. The exemptions under state inheritance taxes vary greatly, ranging from no exemption (Pennsylvania) for bequests to unrelated individuals to unlimited exemptions (Iowa and Kentucky) for bequests to lineal heirs, such as children or parents of the decedent. No states tax bequests to surviving spouses. Only two states (Nebraska and Pennsylvania) tax bequests to lineal heirs. Top tax rates range from 4.5 percent (Pennsylvania on lineal heirs) to 18 percent (Nebraska on collateral heirs).

One state — Maryland — imposes both types of taxes, but the estate tax paid is a credit against the inheritance tax, so the total tax liability is not the sum of the two, but the greater of the two taxes. Its inheritance tax does not apply to bequests to lineal heirs.

== Tax mitigation ==
Mitigation strategies can include making inter vivos (lifetime) transfers that are subject to lower effective tax rates than transfers at death, transferring property through insurance trusts or grantor-retained annuity trusts, making gifts to charity, transferring minority business interests, taking maximal advantage of each spouse's opportunity for exempt transfers; and many others, not the least of which is simply spending more of one's resources during lifetime and thereby reducing total transfers. A 2021 investigation using leaked IRS documents found more than half of the richest 100 Americans are using grantor-retained annuity trusts to avoid paying estate taxes when they die.

== History ==
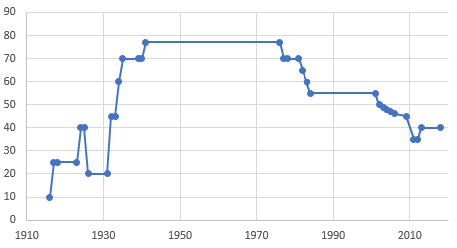
Top Estate Tax Rate, 1914–2018

Taxes on estates or inheritance in the United States have been levied since the 18th century. According to the IRS, a temporary stamp tax in 1797 applied a tax of varying size depending on the size of the bequest, ranging from 25 cents for a bequest between $50 and $100, to 1 dollar for each $500. The tax was repealed in 1802. In the 19th century, the Revenue Act of 1862 and the War Revenue Act of 1898 also imposed similar taxes to fund the Civil War and the Spanish-American War. Each was repealed when the revenue was no longer necessary. The modern estate tax was enacted in 1916.

The modern estate tax was temporarily phased out and repealed by tax legislation in 2001. This legislation gradually dropped the rates until they were eliminated in 2010. However, the law did not make these changes permanent and the estate tax was scheduled to return to 55 percent in 2011.

Late in 2010 Congress passed superseding legislation that fixed the tax at 35 percent tax for 2011 and 2012 on estate in excess of $5 million. Like the 2001 legislation, the 2010 legislation had a sunset clause that would return the tax to its 2001 level, 55 percent, in 2013. On New Year's Day 2013, Congress made permanent a 40 percent tax on estates in excess of $5 million.

In 2025, the One Big Beautiful Act maintained the same federal estate and gift tax exemptions. It raised the lifetime exemption to $15 million for individuals and $30 million for married couples.

== Estate tax and charity ==
Estate tax repeal would have significant deleterious effects on charitable bequests and charitable giving during life. Although estate tax reform will raise many issues, the impact on the nonprofit sector should be a central part of the debate.

== Debate ==
The estate tax is a recurring source of contentious political debate and political football. Generally the debate breaks down between a side which opposes any tax on inheritance, and another which considers it good policy.

=== Arguments in support ===
Proponents of the estate tax argue that large inheritances (currently those over $12 million) are a progressive and fair source of government funding. Removing the estate tax, they argue, favors only the very wealthy and leaves a greater share of the total tax burden on working taxpayers. Proponents further argue that campaigns to repeal the tax rely on public confusion about the estate tax and about tax policy more generally. William Gale and Joel Slemrod give three reasons for taxing at the point of inheritance in their book Rethinking Estate and Gift Taxation. "First, the probate process may reveal information about lifetime economic well-being that is difficult to obtain in the course of enforcement of the income tax but is nevertheless relevant to societal notions of who should pay tax. Second, taxes imposed at death may have smaller disincentive effects on lifetime labor supply and saving than taxes that raise the same revenue (in present value terms) but are imposed during life. Third, if society does wish to tax lifetime transfers among adult households, it is difficult to see any time other than death at which to assess the total transfers made."

While death may be unpleasant to contemplate, there are good administrative, equity, and efficiency reasons to impose taxes at death, and the asserted costs appear to be overblown.

— William Gale and Joel Slemrod

In response to the concern that the estate tax interferes with a middle-class family's ability to pass on wealth, proponents point out that the estate tax currently affects only estates of considerable size (in 2012, over $5 million, and $10 million for couples) and provides numerous credits (including the unified credit) that allow a significant portion of even large estates to escape taxation. Proponents note that abolishing the estate tax will result in tens of billions of dollars being lost annually from the federal budget. Proponents of the estate tax argue that it serves to prevent the perpetuation of wealth, free of tax, in wealthy families and that it is necessary to a system of progressive taxation.

A driving force behind support for the estate tax is the concept of equal opportunity as a basis for the social contract. This viewpoint highlights the association between wealth and power in society – material, proprietary, personal, political, social. Arguments that justify wealth disparities based on individual talents, efforts, or achievements, do not support the same disparities where they result from the dead hand. These views are bolstered by the concept that those who enjoy a privileged position in society should have a greater obligation to pay for its costs. The strength of political opposition to the estate tax, proponents argue, would not be found under a veil of ignorance, in which policy makers were kept from knowing the wealth of their own families.

Winston Churchill argued that estate taxes are "a certain corrective against the development of a race of idle rich". This issue has been referred to as the "Carnegie effect," for Andrew Carnegie. Carnegie once commented, "The parent who leaves his son enormous wealth generally deadens the talents and energies of the son, and tempts him to lead a less useful and less worthy life than he otherwise would'." Some research suggests that the more wealth that older people inherit, the more likely they are to leave the labor market. A 2004 report by the Congressional Budget Office found that eliminating the estate tax would reduce charitable giving by 6–12 percent. Chye-Ching Huang and Nathaniel Frentz of the Center on Budget and Policy Priorities assert that repealing the estate tax "would not substantially affect private saving...." and that repeal would increase government deficits, thereby reducing the amount of capital available for investment. In the 2006 documentary, The One Percent, Robert Reich commented, "If we continue to reduce the estate tax on the schedule we now have, it means that we are going to have the children of the wealthiest people in this country owning more and more of the assets of this country, and their children as well.... It's unfair; it's unjust; it's absurd."

Proponents of the estate tax tend to object to characterizations that it operates as a "double tax". They point out many of the earnings subject to estate tax were never taxed because they were "unrealized" gains. Others describe this point as a red herring given common overlapping of taxes. Chye-Ching Huang and Nathaniel Frentz of the Center on Budget and Policy Priorities assert that large estates "consist to a significant degree of 'unrealized' capital gains that have never been taxed...."

Supporters of the estate tax argue there is longstanding historical precedent for limiting inheritance, and note current generational transfers of wealth are greater than they have been historically. In ancient times, funeral rites for lords and chieftains involved significant wealth expenditure on sacrifices to religious deities, feasting, and ceremonies. The well-to-do were literally buried or burned along with most of their wealth. These traditions may have been imposed by religious edict but they served a real purpose, which was to prevent accumulation of great disparities of wealth, which, estate tax proponents suggest, tended to prevent social destabilization, revolution, or disruption of functioning economic systems.

Economist Jared Bernstein has said: "People call it the 'Paris Hilton tax' for a reason, we live in an economy now where 40 percent of the nation's wealth accumulates to the top 1 percent. And when these folks leave bequests to their heirs, we're talking about bequests in the tens of millions".

Free market supporters of the tax, including Adam Smith and the founding fathers would argue that people should be able to get to the top of the market through earning wealth, based on meritocratic competition, not through unearned, inherited handouts, which were central to the aristocratic systems they were opposed to, and fought the War of Independence to free American citizens from. Smith wrote:

A power to dispose of estates for ever is manifestly absurd. The earth and the fulness of it belongs to every generation, and the preceding one can have no right to bind it up from posterity. Such extension of property is quite unnatural.

Unearned transfers of wealth work against the free market by creating a disincentive of hard work in the recipients, and others in the market. If the income from estate tax is reduced, this would have to be made up broadly through taxes on working people. Accordingly, if estate tax was increased relative to other taxes, Irwin Stelzer argues it could pay for "lowering the marginal tax rate faced by all earners. Reduce taxes on the pay for that extra work, and you will get more of it; reduce taxes on the profits from risk-taking, and entrepreneurs will take more chances and create more jobs. Reduce the taxes on recipients of inheritances, on the other hand, and they will work less and be less likely to start up new businesses..".

Unhindered inheritance has another possible influence on some in the market; if many of the wealthiest in the country acquired their wealth through inheritance, while contributing nothing to the market personally to get there, people at the lower end of the market may have equal economic potential as many of those receiving some of this 40 percent of wealth, but did not have the luck of being born to wealthy parents. The disparity in fair chance of acquiring initial wealth, on top of pre-existing differences in non fiscal sustenance like differing qualities of education, inherited work ethic, and valuable connections, causes resentment and the perception that hard work is of diminished importance, when some will struggle to afford the basics of living even at maximum effort, while others may never need to work, and even present this lifestyle as ideal.. The disparity in initial gifted wealth also means a reduced ability for some to accumulate wealth; it is a lot easier to put money aside if you inherited a house and do not have to rent one. These factors create a system perceived to be rigged against those who are not lucky enough to be born into wealthy families, along with political instability; continuous infighting and even civil wars. Reducing estate tax exacerbates this situation, while increasing estate tax promotes a fairer free market, especially if this excess wealth is used to encourage productivity, while also encouraging wealthy parents to focus on providing the best skills and education for their children. Michael J. Graetz has said: "Indeed, that's what the case for the estate tax boils down to: basic fairness. The tax affects a small number of people who inherit large amounts of wealth—and who can afford to give up a portion of their windfall to help finance their government."

Some proponents of a steep estate tax argue that concentrating wealth in the hands of a few is harmful to both the economy and to democracy itself. Oscar Mayer heir Chuck Collins writes "Billionaires are expanding their shares of the pie at the expense of investments in our social safety net, infrastructure, and education systems," and notes that "Supreme Court Justice Louis Brandeis observed, 'You can have concentrated wealth in the hands of a few or democracy. But you can't have both.'"

=== Arguments against ===
Some people oppose the estate tax on principle of individualism and a market economy. In their view, proponents of the tax often argue that "excess wealth" should be taxed without defining "excess" or explaining why taxing it is undesirable if it was acquired by legal means. Such arguments are seen to have a predilection for collectivist principles that opponents of the estate tax oppose. In arguing against the estate tax, the Investor's Business Daily has editorialized that "People should not be punished because they work hard, become successful and want to pass on the fruits of their labor, or even their ancestors' labor, to their children. As has been said, families shouldn't be required to visit the undertaker and the tax collector on the same day.".

A similar argument is based on a distrust of governments to use taxes for the public good. In an article in Washington Examiner, Michael Shindler argued that "inheritance of multigenerational wealth allows people, especially young people, to comfortably pursue callings that, despite their vital importance to human flourishing, are typically uncompensated by the market" and cites Lord Byron, Thomas Jefferson, and Ludwig Wittgenstein as examples of such individuals. Similarly, Shindler also argues that "whereas in Europe museums, theaters, symphony halls, and other cultural institutions are typically government-subsidized, here they gain the bulk of their funding from the generosity of philanthropic foundations founded and sustained by the stewards of multigenerational wealth....Consequently, American culture is less an expression of the whims of bureaucrats and more a manifestation of the will of its citizenry."

Other arguments against an estate tax are based on its economic effects. The Tax Foundation published research suggesting that the estate tax is a strong disincentive to entrepreneurship. Its 1994 study found that a 55% tax rate had roughly the same effect as doubling an entrepreneur's top effective marginal income tax rate. Also, the estate tax was found to impose a large compliance burden on the U.S. economy. Past studies by the same group estimated compliance costs to be roughly equal to the revenue raised – nearly five times more cost per dollar of revenue than the federal income tax – making it one of the nation's most inefficient revenue sources.

Another argument is that tax obligation can overshadow more fundamental decisions about the assets. In certain cases, it is claimed to create an undue burden. For example, pending estate taxes could be a disincentive to invest in a viable business or an incentive to liquidate, downsize, divest from or retire one. This is especially true when an estate's value is about to surpass the exemption amount. Older people may see less value in maintaining a farm or small business than reducing risk and preserving their capital, by shifting resources, liquidating assets, and using tax avoidance techniques such as insurance, gift transfer, trusts and tax-free investments.

Another argument is that the estate tax burdens farmers because agriculture requires more capital assets, such as land and equipment, to generate the same income that other types of businesses generate with fewer assets. Individuals, partnerships and family corporations own 98% of the nation's 2.2 million farms and ranches. The estate tax may force surviving family members to sell land, buildings, or equipment to continue their operation. The National Farmers Union advocated relief for farmers by increasing the exemption per estate to $5 million. Americans Standing for the Simplification of the Estate Tax advocates relief for farmers and small business owners by eliminating death as a taxable event in what the group describes as a down payment on their estate taxes during their earning years. Along these lines, the American Solution for Simplifying the Estate Tax Act, or 'ASSET Act', of 2014 (H.R. 5872) was introduced on December 11, 2014 to the 113th Congress by Rep. Andy Harris.

Another set of arguments against the estate tax is based on its enforcement. The Tax Foundation notes that because the tax can be avoided with careful estate planning, estate taxes are just "penalties imposed on those who neglect to plan ahead or who retain unskilled estate planners". A disparity between tax rates may encourage wealthy people to minimize taxation by moving their wealth outside the United States. As a result, the collected tax will be far less than claimed by proponents and will lower the tax base, opponents argue. However, most countries have inheritance tax at similar or higher rates.

=== The term "death tax" ===
The caption for section 303 of the Internal Revenue Code of 1954, enacted on August 16, 1954, refers to estate taxes, inheritance taxes, legacy taxes and succession taxes imposed because of the death of an individual as "death taxes". That wording remains in the caption of the Internal Revenue Code of 1986, as amended.

On July 1, 1862, the U.S. Congress enacted a "duty or tax" with respect to certain "legacies or distributive shares arising from personal property" passing, either by will or intestacy, from deceased persons. The modern U.S. estate tax was enacted on September 8, 1916 under section 201 of the Revenue Act of 1916. Section 201 used the term "estate tax". According to Professor Michael Graetz of Columbia Law School and professor emeritus at Yale Law School, opponents of the estate tax began calling it the "death tax" in the 1940s. The term "death tax" more directly refers back to the original use of "death duties" to address the fact that death itself triggers the tax or the transfer of assets on which the tax is assessed.

While the use of terms like "death duty" had been known earlier, specifically calling estate tax the "death tax" was a move that entered mainstream public discourse in the 1990s. This happened after a proposal was shelved that would have reduced the threshold from $600,000 to $200,000, after it proved to be more unpopular than expected, and awakened political interest in reducing the tax. Surveys suggest that opposition to inheritance and estate taxes is even stronger with the poor than with the rich.

The descriptive "death tax" emphasizes that death is the event that invokes a tax on the deceased's former assets. An estate tax is levied on the deceased's assets before they are distributed by the federal government and twelve states; Connecticut, Hawaii, Illinois, Maine, Maryland, Massachusetts, Minnesota, New York, Oregon, Rhode Island, Vermont, and Washington. Six U.S. states levy an inheritance tax on the beneficiary of the estate; Iowa, Kentucky, Maryland, Nebraska, New Jersey and Pennsylvania. Only the state of Maryland taxes both the estate of the deceased and the beneficiary.

Proponents of the tax say the term "death tax" is imprecise, and that the term has been used since the nineteenth century to refer to all the death duties applied to transfers at death: estate, inheritance, succession and otherwise.

Chye-Ching Huang and Nathaniel Frentz of the Center on Budget and Policy Priorities assert that the claim that the estate tax is best characterized as a "death tax" is a myth, and that only the richest 0.14% of estates owe the tax.

Political use of "death tax" as a synonym for "estate tax" was encouraged by Jack Faris of the National Federation of Independent Business during the Speakership of Newt Gingrich.

Well-known Republican pollster Frank Luntz wrote that the term "death tax" "kindled voter resentment in a way that 'inheritance tax' and 'estate tax' do not".

In 2016, presidential candidate Donald Trump released a health care plan which used the term "death penalty" in the context of health savings accounts which would pass tax-free to the heirs of an estate.

== Related taxes ==
The federal government also imposes a gift tax, assessed in a manner similar to the estate tax. One purpose is to prevent a person from avoiding paying estate tax by giving away all his or her assets before death.

There are two levels of exemption from the gift tax. First, transfers of up to (as of 2020) $15,000 per (recipient) person per year are not subject to the tax. Individuals can make gifts up to this amount to each of as many people as they wish each year. In a marriage, a couple can pool their individual gift exemptions to make gifts worth up to $30,000 per (recipient) person per year without incurring any gift tax. Second, there is a lifetime credit on total gifts until a combined total of $5,250,000 (not covered by annual exclusions) has been given.

In many instances, an estate planning strategy is to give the maximum amount possible to as many people as possible to reduce the size of the estate, the effectiveness of which depends on the lifespan of the donor and the number of donees. (This also gives the donees immediate use of the assets, while the donor is alive to see them enjoy it.)

Furthermore, transfers (whether by bequest, gift, or inheritance) in excess of $5 million (tied to inflation in the same manner as the estate tax exemption) may be subject to a generation-skipping transfer tax if certain other criteria are met.

The combined (Federal and state) estate, inheritance, and gift (EIG) tax burden per decedent's impact on the number of firms in the United States. The increase in the gift tax tax burden per decedent reduces the growth in the number of companies, mostly small firms. The asymmetric liquidity effect, which restricts small business owners' ability to collect the funds required to pay the estate tax without liquidating their estates, can be attributed to the higher dissolution rate among small firms.

== Loopholes ==
Many very wealthy people avoid the estate tax by moving money into trusts or charitable foundations before death.

== See also ==
- Lyeth v. Hoey
- Inheritance tax
- Wealth inequality in the United States
