= Sipuel v. Board of Regents of the University of Oklahoma =

Sipuel v. Board of Regents of Univ. of Okla.
- Supreme Court of the United States

Argued January 7–8, 1948 Decided January 12, 1948
- Full case name: Sipuel v. Board of Regents of University of Oklahoma, et al.
- Citations: 332 U.S. 631 (more) 68 S. Ct. 299; 92 L. Ed. 247; 1948 U.S. LEXIS 2645

Case history
- Prior: Judgment for the State, District Court of Cleveland County, Oklahoma, 199 Okla. 36; affirmed, (Supreme Court of Oklahoma 1946) 180 P.2d 135; cert. granted, 332 U.S. 814 (1947).

Holding
- Colleges can not deny admittance based on race.

Court membership
- Chief Justice Fred M. Vinson Associate Justices Hugo Black · Stanley F. Reed; Felix Frankfurter · William O. Douglas; Frank Murphy · Robert H. Jackson; Wiley B. Rutledge · Harold H. Burton

Case opinion
- Per curiam

Laws applied
- U.S. Const. amend. XIV

Sipuel v. Board of Regents of the University of Oklahoma, 332 U.S. 631 (1948), is a per curiam United States Supreme Court decision involving racial segregation toward African Americans by the University of Oklahoma and the application of the Fourteenth Amendment to the United States Constitution.

== Background ==
Ada Lois Sipuel (February 8, 1924 – October 18, 1995), born in Chickasha, Oklahoma, was the daughter of a minister. Her brother planned to challenge segregationist policies of the University of Oklahoma but went to Howard University Law School, in Washington, DC, to avoid delaying his career further by protracted litigation.

Ada Sipuel was willing to delay her legal career to challenge segregation. On January 14, 1946, she applied to the all-white University of Oklahoma, then the only taxpayer-funded law school in Oklahoma. She was denied because of her race.

She then petitioned the District Court of Cleveland County, Oklahoma. Her writ of mandamus was denied. The Oklahoma Supreme Court upheld the decision of the lower district court (in 180 P.2d 135). The petitioners then appealed to the United States Supreme Court.

== Decision ==
Two years later, in 1948, the United States Supreme Court heard the petition on January 7 and 8th, which stated that the "petitioner is entitled to secure legal education afforded by a state institution." They continued, "The State must provide it for her in conformity with the equal protection clause of the Fourteenth Amendment and provide it as soon as it does for applicants of any other group." Citing the 1938 case Missouri ex rel. Gaines v. Canada, a case in which "Lloyd Gaines, a negro, was refused admission to the School of Law of the University of Missouri".

The petitioners, acting on behalf of Miss Sipuel, were Thurgood Marshall of New York City, and Amos Hall, of Tulsa (also on the brief Frank D. Reeves). The respondents, representing the defendants, the university and the State of Oklahoma, were Fred Hansen, of Oklahoma City, the First Assistant Attorney General of Oklahoma, and Maurice H. Merrill, of Norman (also on the brief Mac Q. Williamson, Attorney General). This was a landmark case in the early civil rights movement. The case reversed Lee v. State of Mississippi, and was also a precursor for Brown v. Board of Education.

Only four days after argument, on January 12, the Supreme Court ruled unanimously in favor of Sipuel. The court ruled that the state of Oklahoma must provide instruction for Blacks equal to that of Whites, requiring the admission of qualified black students to previously all-white state law schools, reversing the Supreme Court of Oklahoma decision. In 1950, the Supreme Court again ruled unanimously in Sweatt v. Painter, a case in which Herman Marion Sweatt was refused admission to the University of Texas School of Law on the grounds that the Texas State Constitution prohibited integrated education.

== Aftermath ==
According to Supreme Court Associate Justice John Paul Stevens, who sat in the gallery and watched Marshall argue the case before the court on January 8, 1948, Marshall was "respectful, forceful and persuasive – so persuasive that on the following Monday – only four days after the argument – the Court unanimously ruled in Sipuel's favor." In addition, Ada Sipuel was "not only an excellent student, but was welcomed by her classmates who did not agree with the exclusionary policy that the State had unsuccessfully tried to defend."

A garden, between Jacobson Hall and Carpenter Hall, on the campus of the University of Oklahoma, now stands in honor of the event.

== See also ==
- McLaurin v. Oklahoma State Regents
- Civil Rights Cases
- NCAA v. Board of Regents of the University of Oklahoma
