= The Missouri Bar =

Bar Association in Missouri

- Type: Legal Society
- Headquarters: Jefferson City, Missouri, US
- Location: United States
- Members: 30,000+
- Website: http://www.mobar.org/

The Missouri Bar is the official bar association for all Missouri lawyers and judges. Every licensed Missouri lawyer is automatically a member of The Missouri Bar. Every applicant for admission to the bar must meet a list of requirements set by the Supreme Court of Missouri. To become a Missouri lawyer, a person must have completed an approved law school leading to a juris doctor degree. Additionally, they must pass a comprehensive bar examination and character and fitness investigation and make application for admission to the bar with the Supreme Court of Missouri.

== History ==
The Missouri Bar began as a voluntary membership organization called the Missouri Bar Association founded in 1880. On June 16, 1944, The Missouri Bar was created by order of the Supreme Court of Missouri with the belief that lawyers are stronger when working together. From its start, The Missouri Bar has worked to improve the profession, the law and the administration of justice for all Missourians, with Supreme Court of Missouri Rule 4 stating that it is the "responsibility of the members of the Bar of this Court and of all lawyers who practice in the State of Missouri" and to "strive at all times to uphold the honor and maintain the dignity of the profession and to improve not only the law but the administration of justice".

== Structure ==
Bar policy is set by a board consisting of the organization's officers plus board members elected by district. The officers of The Missouri Bar consist of the President, the President-Elect, the vice-president, and the Immediate Past President. They, along with one representative from each of the three Missouri Court of Appeals districts, make up the organization's executive committee. All members of the executive committee are members of the Board of Governors of The Missouri Bar, the policy-making body elected by the members of the state bar.

Missouri lawyers must complete 15 continuing education credits each year.
