= Missouri ex rel. Gaines v. Canada =

- Supreme Court of the United States

Argued November 9, 1938 Decided December 12, 1938
- Full case name: State of Missouri ex rel. Gaines v. Canada, Registrar of the University of Missouri, et al.
- Citations: 305 U.S. 337 (more) 59 S. Ct. 232; 83 L. Ed. 208; 1938 U.S. LEXIS 440

Case history
- Prior: The Circuit Court denied the writ. The Missouri Supreme Court upheld the judgment against Gaines, 113 S.W.2d 783 (Mo. 1937); cert. granted, 305 U.S. 580 (1938).
- Subsequent: Rehearing denied, 305 U.S. 676 (1939); remanded, 131 S.W.2d 217 (Mo. 1939).

Holding
- States that provide only one educational institution must allow blacks and whites to attend if there is no separate school for blacks.

Court membership
- Chief Justice Charles E. Hughes Associate Justices James C. McReynolds · Louis Brandeis; Pierce Butler · Harlan F. Stone; Owen Roberts · Hugo Black; Stanley F. Reed

Case opinions
- Majority: Hughes, joined by Brandeis, Stone, Roberts, Black, Reed
- Dissent: McReynolds, joined by Butler

Laws applied
- U.S. Const. amend. XIV

Missouri ex rel. Gaines v. Canada, 305 U.S. 337 (1938), was a United States Supreme Court decision holding that states which provided a school to White students had to provide in-state education to Black students as well. States could satisfy this requirement by allowing Black and White students to attend the same school or creating a second school for Black students.

== Background ==
The Registrar at the Law School of the University of Missouri, Silas Woodson Canada, refused admission to Lloyd Gaines because he was black. At the time, Black students could attend no law school specifically in the state. Gaines cited that the refusal violated the Fourteenth Amendment. Furthermore, the state of Missouri had a functioning segregation scholarship program. The State of Missouri had offered to pay for Gaines's tuition at an adjacent state's law school, which he turned down.

Gaines, assisted by the NAACP and Charles Hamilton Houston, sued the all-white university in 1935. The issue was whether Missouri violated the Equal Protection Clause of the Fourteenth Amendment by affording White people, not Black people, the ability to attend law school within the state.

The initial circuit court trial with Missouri Supreme Court began in July 1936. Before the trial began, the chief legal counsel for the University of Missouri, William Hogsett, attempted to convince the courts that Gaines was part of a plot conducted by the NAACP to oppose segregation, and that Gaines did not have any interest in attending law school. Hogsett supported this claim by taking three depositions from other African American applicants. The applicants, Arnett G. Lindsay, John A. Boyd, and Nathaniel A. Sweets denied the claims.

University officials claimed that Gaines was not even eligible for application because Lincoln University, his alma mater, was not an accredited institution. However, Lincoln University was a member of the North Central Association of Colleges and Secondary Schools, which made Gaines valid for application. University officials never officially stated these claims within the trial itself.

== Trial ==
The initial trial started in Columbia, Missouri in Boone County. The registrar of the University of Missouri Law School, Sy Woodson Canada, served as the main defendant and Gaines as the plaintiff. Lawyer Charles H. Houston, who also represented Gaines in circuit court, represented him in the supreme trial.

== Decision ==
Writing for the majority, Chief Justice Charles Evans Hughes held that when the state provides legal training, it must provide it to every qualified person to satisfy equal protection. It can neither send them to other states, nor condition that training for one group of people, such as Black people, on levels of demand from that group. Key to the court's conclusion was that there was no provision for legal education of Black people in Missouri so Missouri law guaranteeing equal protection applied. Sending Gaines to another state would have been irrelevant.

Justice James C. McReynolds's dissent emphasized a body of case law, with sweeping statements about state control of education before suggesting the possibility that despite the majority opinion, Missouri could still deny Gaines admission.

The decision did not quite strike down separate but equal facilities, upheld in Plessy v. Ferguson (1896). Instead, it provided that if there was only one school, students of all races could be admitted. The decision struck down segregation by exclusion if the government provided just one school, making the decision in this case a precursor to Brown v. Board of Education (1954).

This marked the beginning of the Supreme Court's reconsideration of Plessy. The Supreme Court did not overturn Plessy v. Ferguson or violate the "separate but equal" precedents, but began to concede the difficulty and near-impossibility of a state maintaining segregated Black and White institutions that could never be truly equal. This case helped forge the legal framework for Brown v. Board of Education, which banned segregation in public schools.

Despite the initial victory claimed by the NAACP, after the Supreme Court had ruled in Gaines' favor and ordered the Missouri Supreme Court to reconsider the case, Gaines was nowhere to be found. When the University of Missouri soon after moved to dismiss the case, the NAACP did not oppose the motion.

Houston withdrew the case due to Gaines' disappearance. In February 1939, Gaines lived at the Alpha Phi Alpha fraternity house in Chicago while seeking employment. In a brief note to his mother, Callie Gaines, he discussed the pressure that came with his representation of the campaign to desegregate secondary education. A few days after the letter, Gaines left the fraternity house to buy post stamps and was never seen again. Houston and the NAACP dropped the case.

== Legacy ==
While the case was seen as a victory for the NAACP, the Supreme Court still had no power to enforce their decision. Even when declared unconstitutional, many Southern states continued to create new segregation scholarships. Only West Virginia desegregated its graduate and professional school programs because of the case. This decision can be accredited to the president of West Virginia State College (present-day West Virginia State University), John Warren Davis.

Civil Rights activist and advocate Pauli Murray later called the Gaines case the "first major breach in the solid wall of segregated education since Plessy" and considered it "the beginning of the end." The case was the first major legal victory for the NAACP in their campaign for education equality.

== See also ==
- List of United States Supreme Court Cases
- Lloyd L. Gaines
- Civil Rights Cases
- Sipuel v. Board of Regents of Univ. of Okla. - 332 U.S. 631 (1948)
- Sweatt v. Painter - 339 U.S. 629 (1950)
- Brown v. Board of Education of Topeka - 347 U.S. 483 (1954)
- Timeline of the civil rights movement
