= Ford Motor Co. v. NLRB =

- Supreme Court of the United States

Argued December 14, 1938 Decided January 3, 1939
- Full case name: Ford Motor Co. v. National Labor Relations Board
- Citations: 305 U.S. 364 (more) 59 S. Ct. 301; 83 L. Ed. 221; 1939 U.S. LEXIS 1104

Case history
- Prior: 99 F.2d 1003 (6th Cir. 1938); cert. granted, 305 U.S. 585 (1938).
- Subsequent: Remanded, 101 F.2d 1010 (6th Cir. 1939).

Holding
- Right to withdraw petition for enforcement and to withdraw transcripts from record lies within discretion of the court of appeals not the appealing agency, and documents may be retained by court of appeals even after granting permission to withdraw.

Court membership
- Chief Justice Charles E. Hughes Associate Justices James C. McReynolds · Louis Brandeis; Pierce Butler · Harlan F. Stone; Owen Roberts · Hugo Black; Stanley F. Reed

Case opinion
- Majority: Hughes, joined by unanimous
- Roberts took no part in the consideration or decision of the case.

Laws applied
- National Labor Relations Act

Ford Motor Co. v. NLRB, 305 U.S. 364 (1939), is an 8-to-0 decision by the Supreme Court of the United States which held that an administrative agency of the United States government, seeking enforcement of its orders, cannot withdraw its petition or the transcript of the administrative hearing once these have been submitted to the appropriate court. Whether the agency should be permitted to withdraw its petition is a decision for the court of appeals, the Supreme Court said.

== Facts ==
After the passage of the National Labor Relations Act (NLRA) in 1935, the National Labor Relations Board (NLRB) found itself attempting to enforce the law against hundreds of employers, most of whom refused to acknowledge the constitutionality of the NLRA or obey the Board's orders. The Board's practice was to have its Economic Division study the issues and report to the Board; order its attorneys in its Review Division to analyze the case and report to the Board; review the transcripts of the field office trial de novo; receive an oral report about the case from the trial examiner; and have the Chief Counsel's staff prepare a draft decision for Board consideration. But in Morgan v. United States, 298 U.S. 468 (1936) and Morgan v. United States, 304 U.S. 1 (1938), the Supreme Court held that parties in quasi-judicial hearings before the government had the right to be presented with the issues the government was considering, present the agency with a statement, review the proposed findings, review any tentative reports, and submit exceptions and argument to the agency before a final determination is made.

The NLRB had ruled against the Ford Motor Company in a case involving strikebreakers. The agency had asked the United States Court of Appeals for the Sixth Circuit to enforce its order, and had already submitted its trial transcripts and decision to the court. But now the NLRB worried that it might be found in violation of the Morgan rulings, which had come down after its submission to the court of appeals. The NLRB attempted to withdraw its transcripts, but the appellate court refused to turn them over.

== Judgment ==
The Supreme Court held, first, that any decision to allow the agency to withdraw its petition was solely up to the discretion of the court. Second, the Court held that even if the court allowed the petition to be withdrawn, the court still was within its rights to retain the transcripts. Third, the Supreme Court held that the court of appeals had properly permitted the NLRB to withdraw its petition for enforcement so that proceedings could be properly conducted under the Morgan rules, but that the court of appeals still retained the authority to rule on any new petition (for enforcement or dismissal). Fourth, the court of appeals correctly held that it did not have to rule on all the aspects of the case, since the petition for enforcement was being withdrawn for further proceedings.

== See also ==
- US labor law
