= Lyeth v. Hoey =

- Supreme Court of the United States

Argued November 16, 1938 Decided December 5, 1938
- Full case name: Lyeth v. Hoey
- Citations: 305 U.S. 188 (more) 59 S. Ct. 155; 83 L. Ed. 119

Case history
- Prior: Summary judgment granted, 20 F. Supp. 619 (S.D.N.Y. 1937); reversed, 96 F.2d 141 (2d Cir. 1938); cert. granted, 304 U.S. 557 (1938).
- Subsequent: Summary judgment granted on remand, 27 F. Supp. 9 (S.D.N.Y. 1939); affirmed, 112 F.2d 4 (2d Cir. 1940).

Holding
- Property received by an heir under an agreement compromising and settling his contest of the decedent's will is property acquired by "inheritance," within the meaning of § 22(b)(3) of the Revenue Act of 1932, which exempts the value of such property from the income tax.

Court membership
- Chief Justice Charles E. Hughes Associate Justices James C. McReynolds · Louis Brandeis; Pierce Butler · Harlan F. Stone; Owen Roberts · Hugo Black; Stanley F. Reed

Case opinion
- Majority: Hughes

Laws applied
- § 22(b)(3) of the Revenue Act of 1932

Lyeth v. Hoey, 305 U.S. 188 (1938), is a United States Supreme Court case in which the Court held that property received by an heir under a settlement agreement resolving a dispute over the decedent's will is property acquired by "inheritance," which exempts the value of such property from the income tax.

== Background ==
The Petitioner was a grandson of Mary B. Longyear, who died in 1931, a resident of Massachusetts, leaving as her heirs four surviving children and the petitioner and his brother, who were sons of a deceased daughter. In her will, the decedent gave to her heirs certain small legacies. The entire residuary estate, amounting to more than $3,000,000, was bequeathed to an Endowment Trust, the income from which was payable to another trust described as the Longyear Foundation. The main purpose of the Longyear Foundation was to preserve "the records of the earthly life of Mary Baker Eddy," the founder of the Christian Science religion.

When the will was offered for probate in Massachusetts, there was objection by the heirs upon the grounds, among others, of lack of testamentary capacity and undue influence. After a hearing, the probate court granted a motion for the framing of issues for trial before a jury. In that situation, a compromise agreement was entered into between the heirs, the legatees, the devisees, and the executors under the will and the Attorney General of Massachusetts. This agreement provided that the will should be admitted to probate and letters testamentary issued; that the specific and pecuniary bequests to individuals should be enforced; that the bequest of the residuary estate to the Endowment Trust should be disregarded; that $200,000 should be paid to the heirs, and a like amount to the Endowment Trust, and that the net residue of the estate, as defined, should be equally divided between the trustees of the Endowment Trust and the heirs.

The question presented was whether property received from the estate of a decedent in compromise of a claim (settlement of litigation) as an heir was taxable as income. Because of a conflict with the decision of the Court of Appeals for the Fourth Circuit in Magruder v. Segebade, certiorari was granted.

== Opinion of the Court ==
Writing for the majority, Chief Justice Hughes held that whether the petitioner would receive any property in his capacity as heir depended upon the validity of his ancestor's will and the extent to which it would dispose of his ancestor's estate. When, by compromise and the decree enforcing it, that disposition was limited, what he got from the estate came to him because he was heir, the compromise serving to remove pro tanto the impediment to his inheritance. As such, the exemption applies.

== See also ==
- Estate tax in the United States
- Inheritance tax
