= Leandro Verì =

Italian carabiniere (1903–1938)

- Born: 10 November 1903; San Vito Chietino (Chieti)
- Died: 13 December 1938 (aged 35); Laigueglia (Savona)
- Military career
- Allegiance: Kingdom of Italy
- Service: Arma dei Carabinieri
- Service years: 1923 – 1938
- Rank: Appuntato
- Awards: Gold Medal of Military Valour (posthumous)

Leandro Verì (San Vito Chietino, 10 November 1903 – Laigueglia, 13 December 1938) was an Italian carabiniere.

== Biography ==
Born in San Vito Chietino, Chieti, on 10 November 1903, Verì attended the carabiniere student walking course at the Rome school from April to September 1923. Appointed carabiniere, he was assigned to the Legion of Chieti. In December 1926 he moved to that of Treviso and the following year to that of Padua, from which he was transferred, in May 1930, to the Legion of Rome. Moved in December 1931 to the Legion of Genoa, Nervi's company, six years later he was promoted to the rank of appuntato and sent to the Alassio station.

Verì died on 13 December 1938, while serving in Laigueglia, Savona, after being mortally wounded during a nighttime firefight with a dangerous criminal. For this operation, he was decorated posthumously with the Gold Medal of Military Valour by a decree of 18 August 1939.

== Honours ==

At night, searching with his station commander for an unknown man, who, armed with a war rifle and bayonet, had threatened the life of a security guard, he found himself isolated due to the needs of the service itself. Sighting the wanted man, he did not hesitate to chase him and attempt to arrest him. Severely wounded in several parts of the body by a machine gunshot, he returned fire and continued in pursuit of the suspect, reaching him and engaging in a violent struggle with him, even managing to take the rifle from him. Due to his loss of strength, the suspect escaped him and they resumed the pursuit for a long distance. Despite the incessant loss of blood, he fired more shots of his pistol at him, reached him and engaged in a new violent struggle, until, exhausted, he fell along with the opponent who, still able to react, tried to hit him with the bayonet he had at hand. The arrival of the superior officer put an end to the struggle with the killing of the suspect. Transported to a place of treatment, he died after five days of excruciating suffering. Laigueglia (Savona), 13 December 1938.

== Memorials ==
- The Arma dei Carabinieri named the 67th Course of Carabinieri Students after Verì, effective in 1982.
- Subsequently, the 133rd and 246th Auxiliary Carabinieri Students Course and the 124th training course for carabinieri were named after him (year 2009).
- The 2nd Course of Brigadier Students at the Scuola marescialli e brigadieri dei carabinieri (School of Marshals and Brigadiers of the Carabinieri) of Velletri (Metropolitan City of Rome Capital), from 1 September to 5 December 1997.
- The municipality of San Vito Chietino has named a small square in the historic centre after him.
