= Ada Lois Sipuel Fisher =

American civil rights activist and lawyer (1924–1995)

- Born: Ada Lois Sipuel; February 8, 1924; Chickasha, Oklahoma, U.S.
- Died: October 18, 1995 (aged 71); Oklahoma City, Oklahoma, U.S.
- Education: Langston University; University of Oklahoma
- Occupation: Lawyer
- Known for: Key figure in the Oklahoma civil rights movement
- Spouse: Warren Fisher (m. 1944)

Ada Lois Sipuel Fisher (February 8, 1924 – October 18, 1995) was an American lawyer and civil rights activist who was a key figure in the Civil Rights Movement in Oklahoma. She applied for admission into the University of Oklahoma law school in order to challenge the state's segregation laws and to become a lawyer, leading to a landmark US Supreme Court ruling in 1948.

== Early life ==
Fisher was born six years before the lynching of Henry Argo in Chickasha, Oklahoma, to Rev. Travis Bruce Sipuel (1877–1946) and Martha Belle Smith (maiden; 1885–1971). She graduated from Lincoln High School in 1941 as valedictorian. She enrolled in the Arkansas Agricultural, Mechanical & Normal College (now University of Arkansas at Pine Bluff), but transferred to Langston University in 1942. Ada Lois Sipuel, on March 2, 1944, in Chickasha, married Warren Washington Fisher (1916–1987). On May 21, 1945, she graduated from Langston, with honors.

== Supreme Court case ==
Her brother, Lemuel Travis Sipuel (1921–1961), had planned to challenge segregationist policies of the University of Oklahoma, but went to Howard University Law School in Washington, D.C., to not delay his career further by protracted litigation.

Fisher, however, was willing to delay her legal career in order to challenge segregation. In 1946, she applied at the University of Oklahoma and was denied because of race. Two years later, in 1948, the United States Supreme Court ruled in Sipuel v. Board of Regents of the University of Oklahoma that the state of Oklahoma must provide instruction for Blacks equal to that of whites. Thurgood Marshall acted as the head NAACP lawyer for this case and the justices ruled unanimously. The case was also a precursor for Brown v. Board of Education.

== Legal education ==
To comply with the US Supreme Court ruling, Oklahoma created the Langston University School of Law, located at the state capital. Further litigation was necessary to prove that this law school was inferior to the University of Oklahoma College of Law. Finally, on June 18, 1949, Sipuel was the first African American admitted to the University of Oklahoma's law school. By this time, she was married and pregnant with the first of her two children. The law school gave her a chair marked "colored," and roped it off from the rest of the class. Despite this, her classmates and teachers welcomed her, shared their notes and studied with her, helping her to catch up on the materials she had missed. Sipuel had to dine in a separate chained-off guarded area of the law school cafeteria. Years later, she recalled that some white students would duck under the chain and eat with her when the guards were not present.

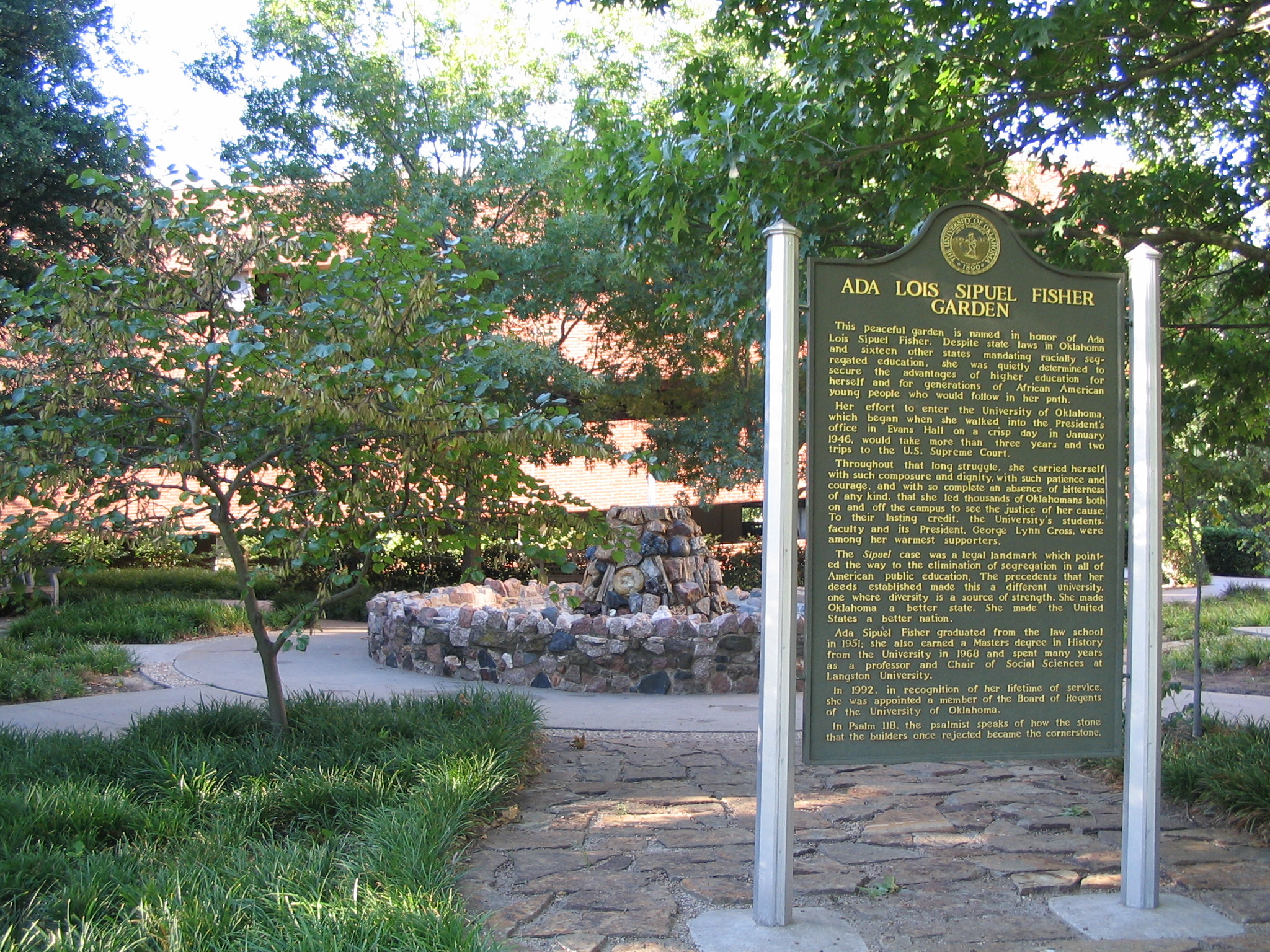
The Ada Lois Sipuel Fisher Garden located on the north part of the main campus in honor of the first African-American to be admitted to the OU College of Law in 1948.

Her lawsuit and tuition were supported by hundreds of small donations.

== Later career ==
She graduated in 1951 with a Bachelor of Laws degree and began practicing law in her hometown of Chickasha in 1952.

In 1992, Oklahoma governor David Walters appointed her to the Board of Regents of the University of Oklahoma, which she noted in an interview, "completes a forty-five-year cycle." She further stated, "Having suffered severely from bigotry and racial discrimination as a student, I am sensitive to that kind of thing," and she planned to bring a new dimension to university policies.

Before her death in 1995, Fisher was a member of Alpha Kappa Alpha sorority and also was a professor at Langston University. She died of cancer, in Oklahoma City in October 1995.

In 1996 she was inducted posthumously in the Oklahoma Women's Hall of Fame. The University of Oklahoma dedicated the Ada Lois Sipuel Fisher Garden in her honor.

== Family ==
Ada Lois Sipuel, on March 2, 1944, in Chickasha, married Warren Washington Fisher (1916–1987), who was born in Paris, Texas, four years before the lynching of Irving and Herman Arthur. Her parents, Rev. Travis Bruce Sipuel and Martha Belle Sipuel, were survivors of the 1921 Tulsa Race Massacre. He was 43 and she was 36. Their house was burned to the ground. They had moved from Dermott, Arkansas, to Tulsa around 1918 to help develop a congregation for the Church of God in Christ (COGIC) (Pentecostal). Sipuel rented a house in the Greenwood District on North Greenwood and leased a building for the North Greenwood COGIC. The building was located at 700 N. Greenwood (presently OSU Tulsa), on the North end of the thriving Black Wall Street. Sipuel helped grow the congregation to 40 during his time there.

== Bibliography ==
=== References ===
- Bernhardt, William [Gene II] (born 1960); Henry, Kim (née Kimberley Diane Blain; born 1964) (2006). Equal Justice: The Courage of Ada Sipuel. Tulsa: Hawk Publishing Group, William Bernhardt, President (publisher). LCCN 2006-928190; ISBN 1-9307-0962-5, 978-1-9307-0962-1 (hardback), ISBN 978-0-9993-4205-3 (e-book); OCLC 76945559; Scribd 358022112 .
- Cross, George Lynn (1975). Blacks in White College – Oklahoma's Landmark Cases (1st ed.). Norman: University of Oklahoma Press. ISBN 9780806112664 – via Internet Archive. LCCN 75-1432; ISBN 0-8061-1266-2, 0-8061-1267-0; OCLC 878136644 (all editions).
- Finkelman, Paul (1993). "Fisher, Ada Lois Sipuel (1924– )". In Hine, Darlene Clark (ed.). Black Women in America – An Historical Encyclopedia. Vol. 1 (of 2) "A–L". Brooklyn: Carlson Publishing Inc. pp. 433–434. ISBN 9780926019614 – via Internet Archive. LCCN 92-39947; ISBN 0-9260-1961-9; OCLC 312047095 (all editions) (book), OCLC 5163777441, 5163767829 (article).
- Fisher, Ada Lois Sipuel; with Danny Goble; foreword by Robert Harlan Henry (1996). A Matter of Black and White – Autobiography of Ada Lois Sipuel Fisher. University of Oklahoma Press. ISBN 9780806128191 – via Internet Archive. LCCN 95-38775; ISBN 0-8061-2819-4; OCLC 1128024990 (all editions).
→ Chapter 3: "Separate But Equal". University of Oklahoma Press. 1996. pp. 43–86. ISBN 9780806128191.
- Hall, Melvin C[urtis, JD] (2009). "Fisher, Ada Lois Sipuel (1924–1995)". Encyclopedia of Oklahoma History and Culture. Vol. 1 (of 2) "A–L". Oklahoma Historical Society. LCCN 2009-42458; ISBN 978-0-9414-9875-3, 0-9414-9875-1; 1087496823, 838050242, 456551444.
- Fisher, Bruce Travis (October 26, 2007). "Oklahoma Voices: Bruce Fisher" (oral history → audio with transcript → recorded at the Ronald J. Norick Downtown Library, Oklahoma City, October 26, 2007). Interviewed by Melba Ruth Holt. Fisher is the son of civil rights activist Ada Lois Sipuel Fisher. He talks about his life growing up in Chickasha and Oklahoma City. Oklahoma City: Metropolitan Library System. OCLC 317313589.
- Isgrigg, Daniel Dale, PhD (born 1975) (May 30, 2020). "Bishop Travis B. Sipuel: A Pentecostal Survivor of the 1921 Tulsa Race Massacre". danieldisgrigg.com. Tulsa: WordPress website of the author.
- Thomas, Robert McG., Jr. (October 21, 1995). "Ada Fisher, 71; Broke a Law School Color Barrier". Obituaries. The New York Times. Vol. 145, no. 50221 (Late ed.). p. 27. ISSN 0362-4331. (permalink – via TimesMachine).
- Oklahoma Supreme Court (1946–1948). Ada Lois Sipuel v. Board of Regents University of Oklahoma, 1948 – . Civil Rights Digital Library, Digital Library of Georgia, supported by a National Leadership Grant for Libraries from the Institute of Museum and Library Services ("Civil Case No. 32756 regarding the first African-American woman admitted to the University of Oklahoma Law School in 1948." → main article: Sipuel v. Board of Regents of the University of Oklahoma).
- Stevens, John Paul (August 6, 2005). "Address to the American Bar Association". Thurgood Marshall Awards Dinner Honoring Abner Mikva – Hyatt Regency Chicago. Washington, D.C.: Supreme Court of the United States (publisher).
- Wattley, Cheryl Brown (2010). "Ada Lois Sipuel Fisher: How a 'Skinny Little Girl' Took on the University of Oklahoma and Helped Pave the Road to Brown v. Board of Education". Oklahoma Law Review. 62 (3). Norman: University of Oklahoma College of Law, University of Oklahoma Press: 449–496. ISSN 0030-1752 (publication); OCLC 653361448 (article).
