= IBM 5880 =

- Developer: Ray Bonner
- Manufacturer: IBM
- Type: Electrocardiograph

The IBM 5880, also known as the IBM 5880 ECG Acquisition and Analysis System, is one of the worlds first portable computerized electrocardiograph and diagnostic tools. Its development came from work performed by IBM scientist Ray Bonner in the 1970s.

== History ==
Starting in 1968 IBM began performing electrocardiograms (also called EKGs) on its employees (by 1980 had collected the results of more than 160,000 tests). These were initially stored on tape for computer analysis and in 1974 IBM began analyzing them with software developed by an IBM research Scientist named Raymond Bonner called the "Bonner 12-lead program version 1" (also referred to as the Bonner/IBM software), using an IBM S/370. At that time the vast majority of ECGs were not computer analyzed. As an example, only an estimated 4 million out of roughly 80 million ECGs performed in the USA in 1976 were sent for computer analysis.

The program was first released in 1972, written in a mix of PL/1 and S/370 assembler, but was lated converted to Fortran by IBM so it could be run on non-IBM systems. This meant that by 1977, 75% of all ECGs analysed by the software were performed using the Marquette processing system, rather than on an IBM Mainframe. The Bonner/IBM program was widely used at this time and was highly rated by cardiologists.

Early computer solutions developed in the 1970s used products like the DEC PDP8 and later the PDP11 to perform analysis in the hospital, but to make this more practical, a self contained and portable device was needed and with the development of microprocessors this became possible. The IBM 5880 was designed to analyze electrocardiograms, measurements of the electrical activity of the heart, and provide diagnostic advice to the same standards as a cardiologist. It was one of the first EKGs that could be placed in a cart and taken into hospital conditions.

An IBM ad in the American Journal of Cardiologists from December 1978 describes it as the "New IBM 5880 ECG Acquisition and Analysis System", under the headline "Announcing bedside computer-assisted | ECG interpretation within minutes", suggesting it was released in 1978.

== Product Details ==
The IBM 5880 has the following features:

- Uses a standard power socket
- The analysis takes around 80 seconds, but could take up to 3 minutes based on the arrhythmia that is detected
- Prints a 3-channel ECG trace with detailed interpretation
- Uses an advanced IBM Analysis Program designed by Raymond E. Bonner PhD, developed with practising cardiologists
- Stores ECGs electronically on magnetic diskette
- Has a keyboard to enter patient data which can be printed on the same report as the trace and analysis
- Can automatically apply paediatric interpretation criteria if the patient's age is 18 or younger

Pricing in 1978 was as follows:

- The 5880 base cart list price listed at $19,800 USD with an extra diskette drive costing $2,500.
- The IBM ECG Analysis Program (5890-PP1) cost $350 per month and was supported by IBM Biomedical Systems in Dayton NJ.

== Sale of IBM Biomedical Systems ==
While based on published commercials, IBM were still selling the 5880 in 1982, when IBM Biomedical Systems and all of its assets was sold to Cobe Laboratories in 1984, only the IBM Blood Products (IBM 2991 and IBM 2997) are mentioned in available sources.
