= Chickasha station =

Historic train station in Oklahoma

Chickasha
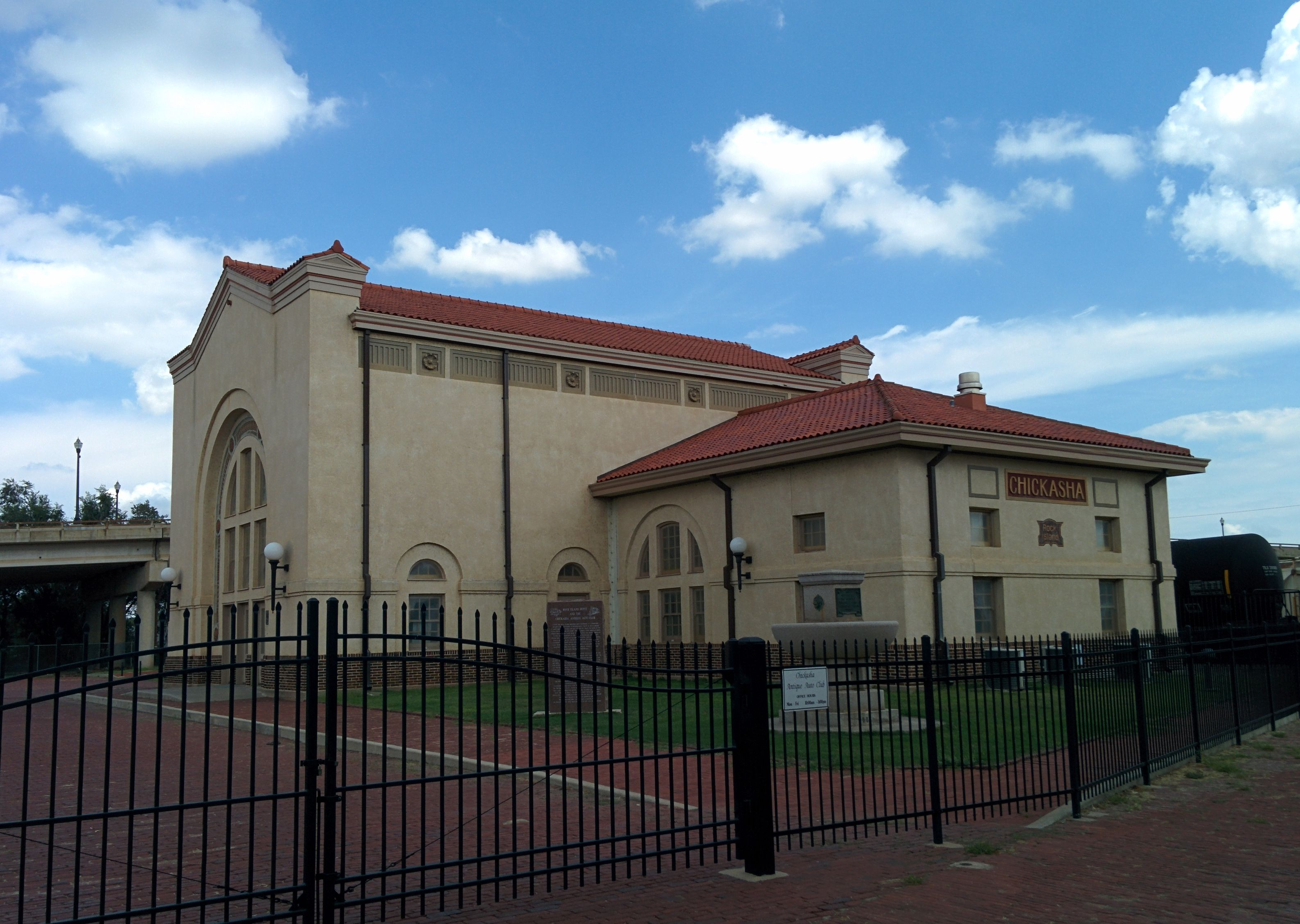

General information
- Location: Chickasha Ave. Chickasha, Oklahoma
- Coordinates: 35°03′07″N 97°55′55″W
- System: Former Rock Island Line passenger rail station

History
- Opened: June 16, 1911

Services
Preceding station	Chicago, Rock Island and Pacific Railroad	Following station
Rush Springs toward Teague	Teague – Minneapolis	El Reno toward Minneapolis
- Rock Island Depot
- U.S. National Register of Historic Places
- NRHP reference No.: 85000699
- Added to NRHP: March 29, 1985
Location

Chickasha station is a former railway station in Chickasha, Oklahoma.

The Chicago, Rock Island and Pacific Railroad (or Rock Island for short) established a station at Chichasha initially out of a boxcar. The first "permanent" station on the site was a very rudimentary barn-like building. The Rock Island initiated a series of upgrades along their line in Oklahoma beginning in 1910. This included yard improvements as well as new depots along the line. The new station building at Chichasha opened on June 16, 1911. The station would also serve as the terminus of the Chickasha Street Railway, a streetcar line, between 1910 and 1927.

It was added to the National Register of Historic Places on March 29, 1985, at which time it was still in use for railroad operations.
