= Arts District, Oklahoma City =

Coordinates: 35°28′10″N 97°31′24″W

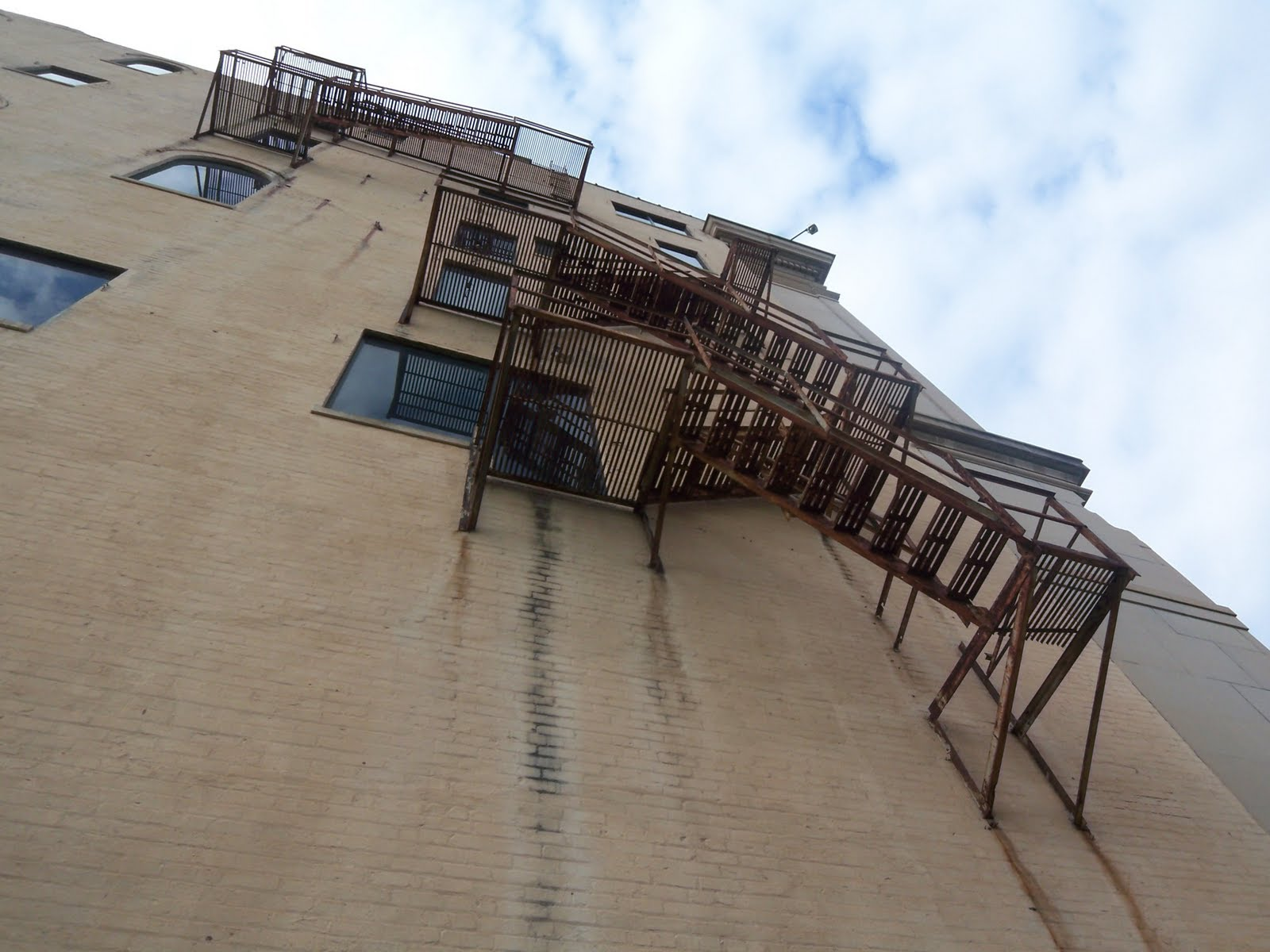
Arts District, Oklahoma City, OK, US

The Arts District is an area of Oklahoma City with many of the city's popular attractions and venues. Many of the buildings in the district are known for urban art deco architecture and charm.

Located at the near western portion of downtown just outside the skyscrapers of the Central Business District, the Arts District includes attractions such as the Myriad Gardens, the Civic Center Music Hall, Stage Centre for the Performing Arts, the Ronald J. Norick Downtown Library, the Oklahoma City Municipal Building, the Oklahoma City Museum of Art, and the Oklahoma City National Memorial.

Due west of the Arts District is the Film Exchange District and WesTown.
