= Carnegie Centre (Oklahoma City) =

Historic building in Oklahoma, United States

- Main Public Library
- U.S. National Register of Historic Places
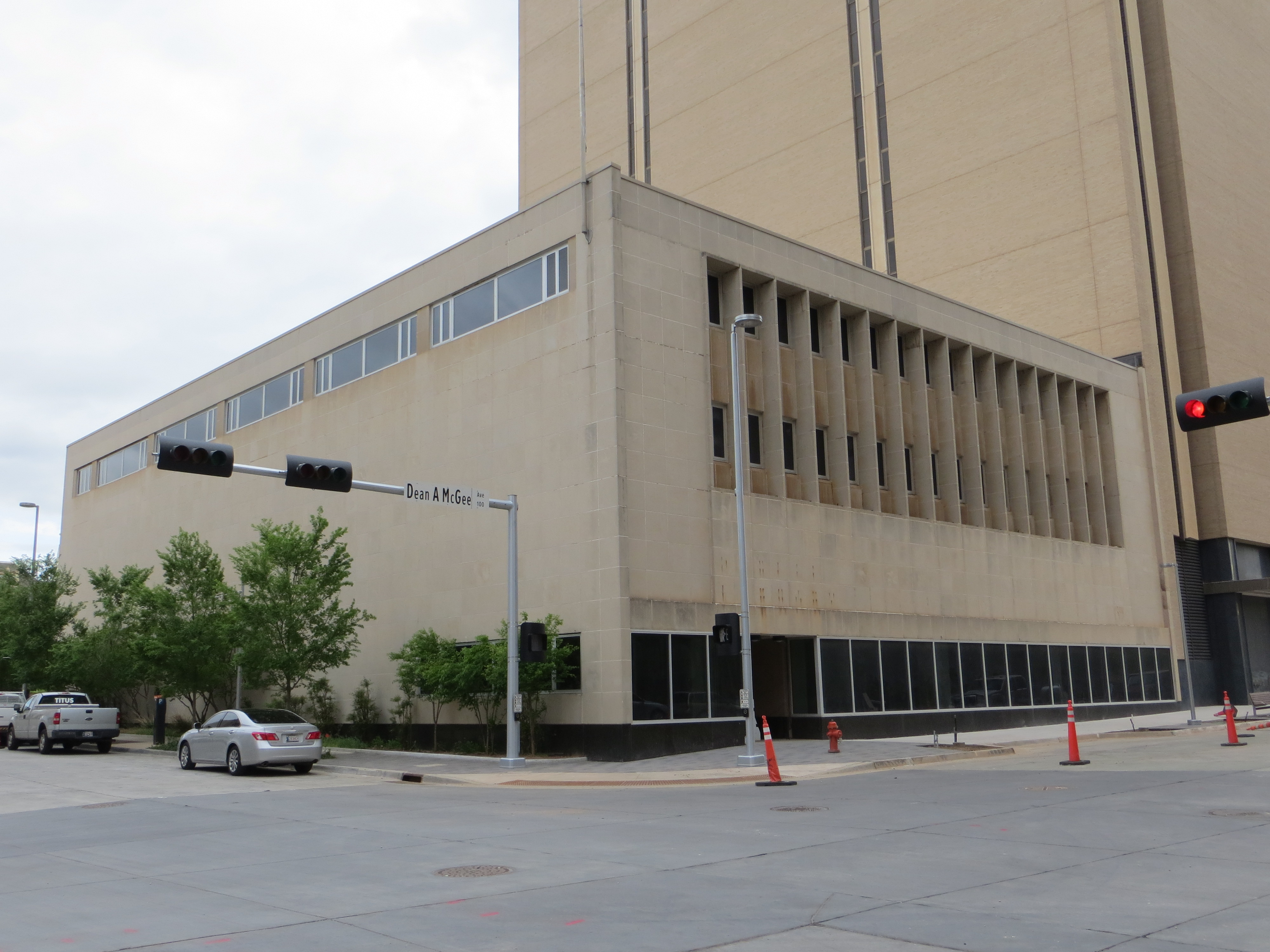

- Location within Oklahoma Location within the United States
- Location: 131 Dean McGee Ave, Oklahoma City, Oklahoma
- Coordinates: 35°28′16″N 97°30′58″W
- Area: less than one acre
- Built: 1953
- Architects: Winkler & Reid; Bollinger Construction Co.
- Architectural style: Modern Movement
- NRHP reference No.: 10001009
- Added to NRHP: December 13, 2010

Carnegie Centre (originally the Main Public Library of Oklahoma City) is a mixed-use building at 131 Dean A. McGee Avenue in downtown Oklahoma City, Oklahoma, United States. Designed by Winkler and Reid, it was built from 1951 to 1954 as Oklahoma City's second main library building, replacing the first building on the same site. After the Ronald J. Norick Downtown Library opened in 2004, the old main library was redeveloped by Judy Hatfield from 2007 to 2014. The building contains residential lofts and commercial space. It is on the National Register of Historic Places.

== Description ==
Carnegie Centre, originally Oklahoma City's second Main Public Library, is located at 131 Dean A. McGee Avenue (originally NW Third Street) in downtown Oklahoma City, Oklahoma, United States. The building sits at the northeast corner with Robinson Avenue, across from the Braniff Building to the south and the United States Post Office, Courthouse, and Federal Office Building to the west. It was designed by Winkler and Reid in the modern style, has four stories and a basement.

=== Exterior ===
The street-facing exterior walls are composed primarily of cast stone panels, except for the foundations, which are clad with black granite. The southern elevation of the facade on Dean McGee (Third) contains the main entrance. Large fixed-pane display windows with aluminum panes occupy much of the first floor, and a broad horizontal cast-stone band runs above it. The second story has no windows on the southern elevation, where the library stacks were located. The third and fourth stories have recessed rectangular bays, each with one window per bay, separated by protruding concrete bands and narrow vertical panels.

The western elevation faces Robinson and is set back from a narrow strip of planting. There is one large display window at the southern end of the first floor, and a band of windows on the fourth floor. Aside from that, the western elevation lacks windows, dampening noise from outdoors. The northern or rear elevation, which faces an alleyway with a small parking area, is divided vertically into four bays and made of concrete above a foundation of dark brown brick. There is a drive-through window on the northern elevation for dropping off books; this window, which required motorists to reserve their books in advance, was reportedly a first in the United States. The northern elevation's second elevation lacks windows and is protruded slightly above the alleyway, while the third and fourth floors have identical three-part windows to each other.

The building has a tar-and-asphalt flat roof with a white rectangular penthouse above it. The penthouse has a metal door, along with small windows and vents. Due to the 1995 Oklahoma City bombing nearby, almost all the windows have been replaced; the original doors were replaced at some point before the bombing.

=== Interior ===
The library's interiors were deliberately built without many windows to reduce the need for draperies; to make up for the limited natural light exposure, there were planting boxes and air conditioning. A book dumbwaiter connected the various floors as well. The interior could fit 100,000 volumes in its stacks, along with 200 patrons simultaneously. There were originally few partitions or interior walls.

The basement, devoted to children's departments, measures 11 feet 4 inches (3.45 m) tall and contained book stacks and a reading room. More reading rooms were placed on the first and second stories for adult patrons. The first floor measures 12 feet 8 inches (3.86 m) tall had the main lobby, service counter, and a large reading room. The windowless second floor, the shortest at just 8 feet 8 inches (2.64 m), had more stacks and some research spaces. The third and fourth stories collectively had 24 individual-research areas. The third floor contained another large reading room and office areas, while the fourth floor included an auditorium (later used as an audiovisual department, then an office). The departments included the Charles E. France room, named after a prominent Oklahoma City resident, which had Victorian decor and imported Italian mahogany furniture, in contrast to the modern-styled interiors elsewhere in the building. Parts of the interior, such as the elevator and the fourth floor reading room, remained intact after the building was redeveloped in the 2010s.

== History ==
The site was previously occupied by Oklahoma City's original main library, a Carnegie library. The original Carnegie library developed from the Philomathea Club, a women's study group formed in 1889 or 1891. After the businessman Andrew Carnegie provided $25,000 for the first building in 1899, a site was selected at the northeast corner of NW Third and Robinson streets. Marshall R. Sanguinet was hired to design the building, and the cornerstone was laid on August 16, 1900; the library opened slightly over one year later, on August 29, 1901. At the time, it was intended to serve a population of 10,000. Within a decade, the Carnegie building faced overcrowding, prompting an expansion in 1909. During the next half-century, Oklahoma City's library system gradually grew to include several branches.

=== Development ===
As early as 1937, head librarian Mabel Peacock was advocating for a bond issue to help fund a new library. By 1945, Oklahoma City's Carnegie library served a quarter-million people, prompting the creation of Friends of the Library, which raised funds for a new library branch. That year, $500,000 in bond funding was proposed for the new library and ultimately approved. The Friends of the Library formulated a new plan for the library in 1947, and the next year, the Oklahoma City Council approved hiring Winkler and Reid as architects. By early 1950, the new library was planned to cost slightly over $1 million, though the city council suggested reducing the construction cost to about half that. A second bond issue for $800,000 was approved that year, bringing the total amount available to $1.322 million, and the existing Carnegie library was chosen as the new library's site after some debate.

The old Carnegie library was closed in August 1951 and was demolished by the following year. The main library's collection was temporarily moved to a new branch on Capitol Hill, and library offices were moved to Roosevelt School. Bollinger Construction Company, the low bidder for the site, was the general contractor for the project. The building was almost ready to open by early 1953, though some finishes were incomplete, and the first part of the new building was opened on July 6, 1953. Initially, only parts of the first floor and basement were open to the public, accommodating the children's department. The new Main Library was completed in 1954 and dedicated on January 10 that year.

=== Usage ===
When the new Main Library opened, the air-conditioned interiors attracted a variety of visitors. The library saw a 430% increase in library registrations in the fiscal year following the building's opening. The Main Library became the main branch of the Metropolitan Library System of Oklahoma County when the system was created in 1964. During the late 20th century, the building hosted programs such as speed-reading courses stamp exhibits, puppet shows, and reads-aloud. It also repaired the library system's books and stored parts of the system's research collection. The basement had shelves for books that were being donated to places such as food banks, mobile home parks, senior centers, and jails. The fourth-floor film department had become one of the library's most popular departments by the 1970s; the library system had stopped lending music records because they were so easily damaged.

By the early 1970s, the library's services had outgrown the building, and there were proposals to sell the property and move the Metropolitan Library System's main branch elsewhere. The Oklahoma City Council proposed allocating $5.9 million for a new branch in 1974, which would have spanned 138,000 square feet (12,800 m^{2}) and would have been incorporated into the Myriad Gardens project. A $5.9 million bond issue for the new main library was proposed, but voters rejected the bond issue that year. The city also failed to secure federal funding for the proposed library. A $5.5 million allocation for a new library was again brought up in 1978 as part of Proposition 12; at that time, the Metropolitan Library System proposed converting the 1954 library into office space. This proposition was voted down by a more than 2-to-1 margin. A new library building, costing $12.8 million, was again being proposed by 1988. Library officials said at the time that the existing building was not accessible. The 1995 Oklahoma City bombing, which happened two blocks away, blew out nearly all the building's windows, requiring their replacement.

The second main library building was replaced in 2004 by the Ronald J. Norick Downtown Library; the second library closed a day ahead of schedule on July 15, 2004, due to an air-conditioner failure. City officials then attempted to auction the second library but received only one bid, which was below the minimum value of $950,000. Judy J. Hatfield ultimately purchased the former library from the city in 2007. Hatfield's plans for the building originally called for the addition of residential condominiums inside, which would have required adding windows on the second floor. The Great Recession of the late 2000s caused Hatfield to lose two potential loans, prompting her to "beg, borrow, and steal" to obtain a loan; she eventually got a loan from Arvest Bank, which required that some of the condos be presold. The exterior design was retained, and the second floor became a parking garage. The building reopened in 2014 with a vegetarian restaurant, salon, corporate headquarters, residences, real-estate firm, and charter school. The University of Central Oklahoma opened a downtown campus within the building in 2015.

== See also ==
- National Register of Historic Places listings in Oklahoma County, Oklahoma
