= Boston Library Consortium =

American non-profit charitable organization

Boston Library Consortium, Inc.
- Abbreviation: BLC
- Formation: 1970; 56 years ago
- Type: 501(c)(3), charitable organization
- Tax ID no.: 04-2605198
- Location: Franklin, Massachusetts, United States
- Region served: New England
- Members: 26
- President: Christina Bleyer
- Executive Director: Charlie Barlow
- Revenue: US$1,531,667 (2024)
- Expenses: US$1,482,195 (2024)
- Staff: 5
- Website: blc.org

The Boston Library Consortium (BLC) is a library consortium based in the Boston metro area with 26 member institutions across New England.

== Membership and governance ==
The Boston Library Consortium is a consortium of twenty-six institutions: sixteen in Massachusetts, five in Connecticut, one in New Hampshire, one in Rhode Island, and two in Vermont. The Internet Archive is an affiliate member. Member institutions represent a mixture of liberal arts colleges, research universities, public and private higher education institutions, special libraries, and public libraries. New members may join the BLC if they are based in the northeastern United States and if their application is approved by a two-thirds vote of the board of directors. The BLC is funded through membership dues.

The BLC is administered by an Executive Director and governed by a board of directors. Each member institution of the BLC is represented on the Board by the chief librarian of its principal library. According to its bylaws, the consortium's purpose is "to share human and information resources so that the collective strengths support and advance the research and learning of the members’ constituents."

== Members ==
Current members include the following institutions:

- Bentley University
- Boston Architectural College
- Boston College
- Boston Public Library
- Boston University
- Brandeis University
- Connecticut College
- Internet Archive - Affiliate Member
- Marine Biological Laboratory and Woods Hole Oceanographic Institution
- Middlebury College
- Northeastern University
- Smith College
- State Library of Massachusetts
- Trinity College
- Tufts University
- University of Connecticut
- University of Hartford
- University of Massachusetts Amherst
- University of Massachusetts Boston
- University of Massachusetts Dartmouth
- University of Massachusetts Lowell
- University of Massachusetts Chan Medical School
- University of New Hampshire
- University of Rhode Island
- University of Vermont
- Wellesley College
- Wesleyan University
- Williams College

== History ==
The BLC was founded in 1970 and officially incorporated in 1977, consisting originally of five institutions. It had grown to twelve institutions by 1993, seventeen by 2014, nineteen by 2019, and 28 by 2026. Former members include Brown University and Massachusetts Institute of Technology (MIT). The BLC partnered with the Faxon Company to launch development of a union list of serials in 1982. BLC executive directors have included Hannah Stevens as of 2000, Barbara Preece as of 2002, Melissa Trevvett as of 2010, Susan Stearns from 2014 to 2020, and Charlie Barlow since 2020.

== Activities ==
Major BLC areas of activity include resource sharing and professional development. The BLC runs a "BLC Leads" program to foster leadership development among member library staff, a reciprocal borrowing agreement through which faculty and other patrons affiliated with any member library can borrow materials for free from other member libraries, a shared virtual catalog and rapid delivery of materials between libraries to fulfill patron requests, cooperative purchasing of scholarly resources, and hosting of communities of interest to foster discussion and collaboration among member libraries. Past activities included cooperative collecting and sharing of materials in select subject areas, such as women's studies.

In 2007, the BLC partnered with the Open Content Alliance (OCA) to digitize BLC member libraries' out-of-copyright print collections and make them freely available online through the Internet Archive. To fund this initiative, the BLC and its members pledged more than $845,000 over two years. This partnership made the BLC the first large-scale consortium to embark on a self-funded digitization project with the OCA.

In 2014, the BLC, along with the Orbis Cascade Alliance and other groups, advocated against a publisher price increase on e-books, which they feared would negatively impact academic library budgets.

From 2014 to 2023, the BLC administered the Eastern Academic Scholars' Trust (EAST), a collective collection initiative across more than one hundred academic libraries throughout the eastern United States. EAST member libraries have committed to retaining over six million volumes. EAST's purpose is "preserving the print scholarly record and ensuring its availability for scholars, students and faculty." Under BLC auspices, the EAST initiative received startup grants totaling $1.5 million from the Andrew W. Mellon Foundation and the Davis Educational Foundation in 2014–2015. The BLC provided EAST with staffing and administrative support, technical infrastructure, financial services, and general oversight. By 2018, EAST had become self-supporting through institutional membership fees. In June 2023, EAST became an independent nonprofit organization.

Since 2021, the BLC has pursued a program for controlled digital lending. In 2022, the Davis Educational Foundation awarded the BLC a grant of $215,000 to "accelerate the implementation of controlled digital lending as a mechanism for interlibrary loan." In 2023, the Institute of Museum and Library Services (IMLS), a U.S. federal government agency, awarded the BLC a National Leadership Grant for Libraries totaling $249,221 to "support and scale a reusable and sustainable solution enabling controlled digital lending as a component of libraries’ interlibrary loan services."

In October 2023, the BLC became the new fiscal sponsor of Project ReShare, a community of libraries, consortia, information organizations, and developers that has been developing and implementing open-source software for library resource sharing since 2018.
