= Jeane Porter Hester =

American physician

- Born: June 15, 1929; Big Spring, Texas, U.S.
- Died: December 24, 2018 (aged 89); Galveston, Texas, U.S.
- Education: Oklahoma College for Women, Oklahoma City University, University of Oklahoma
- Awards: University of Science and Arts of Oklahoma Hall of Fame, Texas Women's Hall of Fame, Oklahoma Hall of Fame, Cohn de Laval Award
- Scientific career
- Fields: Oncology
- Workplaces: University of Texas MD Anderson Cancer Center

Jeane Porter Hester (June 15, 1929 – December 24, 2018) was an American physician known for her work in cancer research and therapy. She was a Professor of Medicine, Chief of Supportive Therapy, and Chief of Leukapheresis at University of Texas MD Anderson Cancer Center in Houston, Texas, and was one of the developers of IBM 2997, the computerized blood cell separator. She was inducted into the Texas Women's Hall of Fame in 1984 and the Oklahoma Hall of Fame in 1987.

== Early life ==
Jeane Porter was born on June 15, 1929, in Big Spring, Texas. She grew up in Chickasha, Oklahoma. After graduating from Chickasha High School, she attended Oklahoma College for Women in Chickasha, where she majored in French and minored in history and philosophy.

== Medical career ==
After graduating, she worked for a medical doctor in Chickasha and then as a secretary for an ophthalmologist in Oklahoma City, Dr. Welborn Sanger. Sanger, recognizing her potential talent in the medical field, promoted her to surgical assistant. Sanger encouraged her to complete a medical degree, so she studied in the pre-medical program at Oklahoma City University, graduating in 1963. She was admitted to the University of Oklahoma College of Medicine, from which she graduated in 1967. In 1971, she completed a residency in hematology and oncology, and from 1971 to 1973, she was a fellow in oncology at the University of Texas MD Anderson Cancer Center. Hester then became an assistant professor at MD Anderson, where she worked in cancer hematology research. She rose to the rank of professor and became Chief of Supportive Therapy and Chief of Leukapheresis service. Through the National Heart, Lung, and Blood Institute she worked as an exchange scientist to the Soviet Union.

Hester was one of the developers of IBM 2997, the computerized blood cell separator. The separator is "used in diagnosing red and white blood cells and platelets and the enhancement of cells to combat tumors."

Hester served on the editorial boards of the Journal of Clinical Apheresis, the Journal of the American Medical Association, and Plasma Therapy and Transfusion Technology. She has contributed to over 25 books and over 125 other writings.

=== Treatment of the former Shah of Iran ===
After the former Shah travelled to Panama in 1979, Dr. Jeane Hester was engaged to help treat his cancer and convinced IBM to supply an IBM 2991 blood cell washer and an IBM 2997 blood cell separator to support this. IBM sent an engineer named Pete Greco to install the machines, but on arrival at Gorgas Hospital he found the 2997 was missing a pump mounting pin. After Hester and Greco tried to repair the machine without it, Greco had to fly back to Miami to get the required part. While they then succeeded in getting the machine working, the surgery was postponed following a dispute between the American and Panamanian medical teams over who would control the operation. This was not resolved and the former Shah later left for Egypt.

== Personal life and death ==
Jeane Porter married Bob Hester in 1951, and their son Steven was born in 1953. Jeane Porter Hester died in Galveston, Texas on December 24, 2018, at the age of 89.

== Awards ==
Hester was a member of the Oklahoma College for Women Hall of Fame, the Texas Women's Hall of Fame, and the Oklahoma Hall of Fame. She was a recipient of the Cohn de Laval Award for great scientific contributions to apheresis.
