= Willie Roberts (American football, born 1931) =

American gridiron football player (1931–2015)

Profile
- Position: End

Personal information
- Born: March 8, 1931; Chickasha, Oklahoma, U.S.
- Died: July 7, 2015 (aged 84); Grove, Oklahoma, U.S.
- Listed height: 6 ft 0 in (1.83 m)
- Listed weight: 190 lb (86 kg)

Career information
- High school: Chickasha (OK)
- College: Tulsa
- NFL draft: 1953: 4th round, 48th overall pick

Career history
- 1955, 1957: Calgary Stampeders

William S. Roberts (March 8, 1931 – July 7, 2015) was an American professional football player who played for the Calgary Stampeders. He played college football at the University of Tulsa.
