= Cowboy Hill (American football) =

American football player (1899–1966)

No. 11, 7, 21, 6
- Position: Tailback

Personal information
- Born: March 30, 1899; Pittsburg, Oklahoma, U.S.
- Died: February 3, 1966 (aged 66); Norman, Oklahoma, U.S.
- Listed height: 5 ft 8 in (1.73 m)
- Listed weight: 176 lb (80 kg)

Career information
- High school: Chickasha (Chickasha, Oklahoma)
- College: Oklahoma

Career history
- Toledo Maroons (1923); Kansas City Blues/Cowboys (1924–1925); New York Giants (1925–1926)
- Stats at Pro Football Reference

Harry Franklin "Cowboy" Hill (March 30, 1899 – February 3, 1966) was an American professional football tailback who played four seasons with the Toledo Maroons, Kansas City Blues/Cowboys and New York Giants of the National Football League (NFL). He played college football at the University of Oklahoma.

== Early life and college ==
Harry Franklin Hill was born on March 30, 1899, in Pittsburg, Oklahoma. He attended Chickasha High School in Chickasha, Oklahoma.

He was a four-year letterman for the Oklahoma Sooners from 1918 to 1921.

== Professional career ==
Hill started all eight games for the Toledo Maroons of the National Football League (NFL) in 1923, scoring three rushing touchdowns. The Maroons finished the season with a 3–3–2 record, tenth-place in the league standings.

He appeared in five games, starting four, for the NFL's Kansas City Blues in 1924. The next season, he played in eight games, starting five, for the newly-renamed Kansas City Cowboys and scored one rushing touchdown.

Hill finished the 1925 NFL season playing two games for the New York Giants during their inaugural season. He returned to the Giants the following year and played in 10 game, starting four, during the 1926 NFL season, recording two rushing touchdowns as the Giants finished with a 8–4–1 record, sixth place in the NFL.

== Later life ==
Hill died on February 3, 1966, in Norman, Oklahoma.
