= Sam Rayburn (American football) =

American football player (born 1980)

No. 91
- Position: Defensive tackle

Personal information
- Born: October 20, 1980 (age 46); Chickasha, Oklahoma, U.S.
- Listed height: 6 ft 3 in (1.91 m)
- Listed weight: 303 lb (137 kg)

Career information
- High school: Chickasha
- College: Tulsa
- NFL draft: 2003: undrafted

Career history
- Philadelphia Eagles (2003–2006); San Francisco 49ers (2007)*; Miami Dolphins (2007)
- * Offseason or practice squad member only

Career NFL statistics
- Total tackles: 86
- Sacks: 9
- Forced fumbles: 2
- Fumble recoveries: 1
- Stats at Pro Football Reference

Sam Branson Rayburn (born October 20, 1980) is an American former professional football player who was a defensive tackle in the National Football League (NFL). He played college football for the Tulsa Golden Hurricane and was signed by the Philadelphia Eagles as an undrafted free agent in 2003.

Rayburn was also a member of the San Francisco 49ers and Miami Dolphins.

== Early life ==
Sam Rayburn was a member of the Chickasha High School football team, which was the 1997 and 1998 Oklahoma State runner-up. Chickasha lost both times to Oklahoma City Carl Albert High school. In those two years, the team went 25–3.

== Professional career ==
=== Philadelphia Eagles ===
Rayburn joined the Philadelphia Eagles as an undrafted free agent from the University of Tulsa prior to the 2003 season. He played in 53 games and recorded 86 tackles and nine sacks with the Eagles from 2003 to 2006. He was released by the team on May 11, 2007.

=== San Francisco 49ers ===
On June 5, 2007, the San Francisco 49ers announced that they would sign Rayburn to a free agent contract. On September 1, 2007, he was released by the 49ers.

=== Miami Dolphins ===
Rayburn signed with the Miami Dolphins on October 10, 2007. He was waived on October 30, 2007.
