= Pioneer Library System =

Public library system in Central Oklahoma

- Location: Norman, Oklahoma, United States of America
- Established: 1958
- Branches: 12

Access and use
- Access requirements: All who reside, work, own property or attend school in the 1,903 square mile area of Cleveland, McClain, and Pottawatomie counties, or Metropolitan Library System cardholders
- Population served: 389,627

Other information
- Director: Lisa Wells
- Employees: 313
- Website: http://www.pioneerlibrarysystem.org/

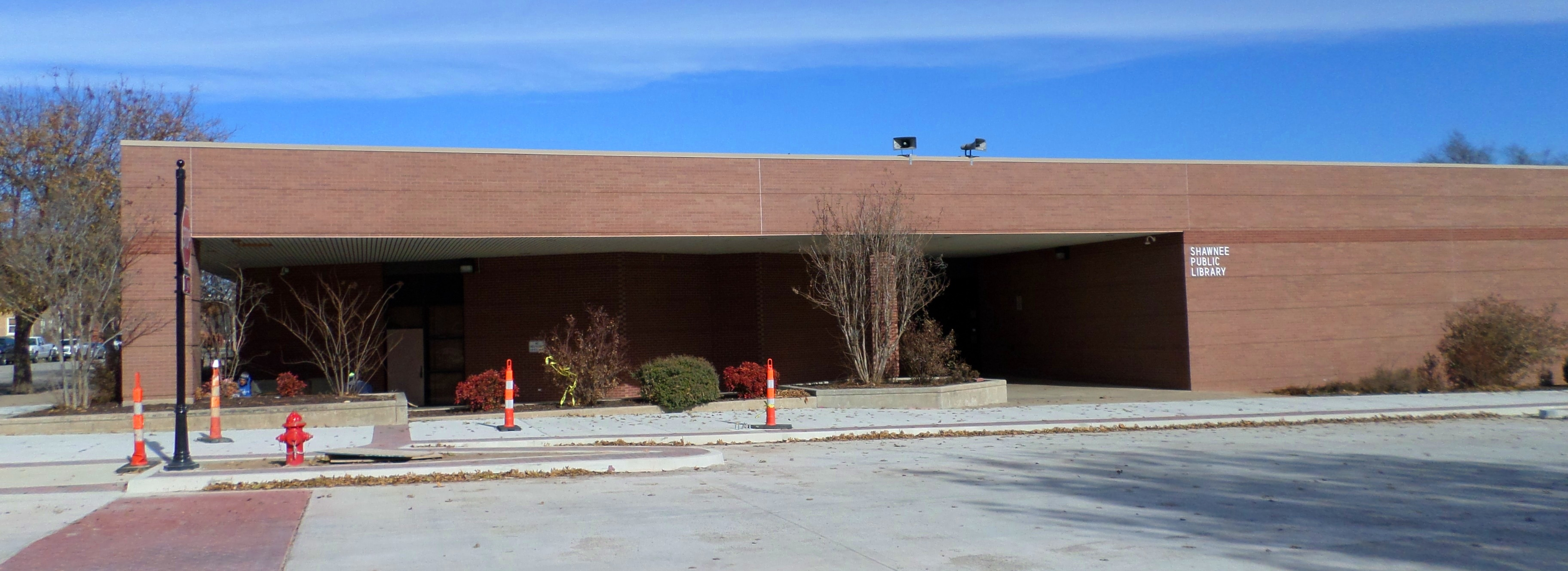
Shawnee Public Library

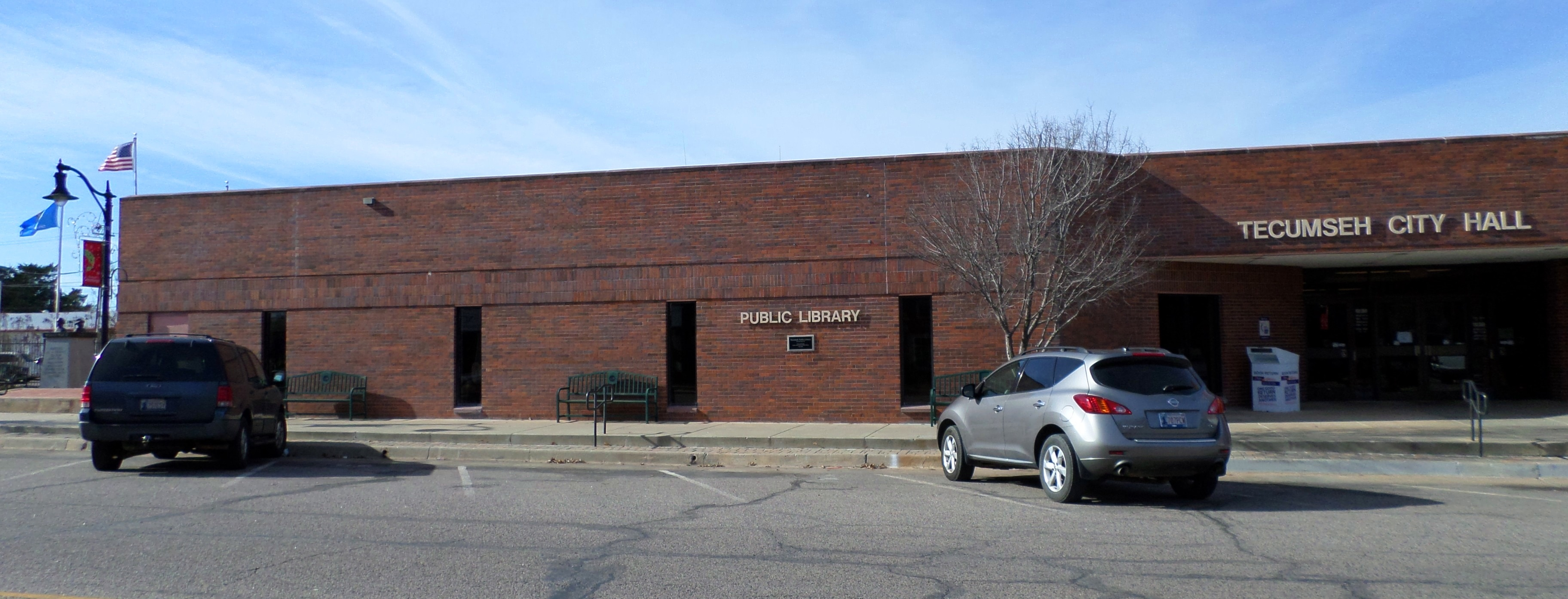
Tecumseh Public Library

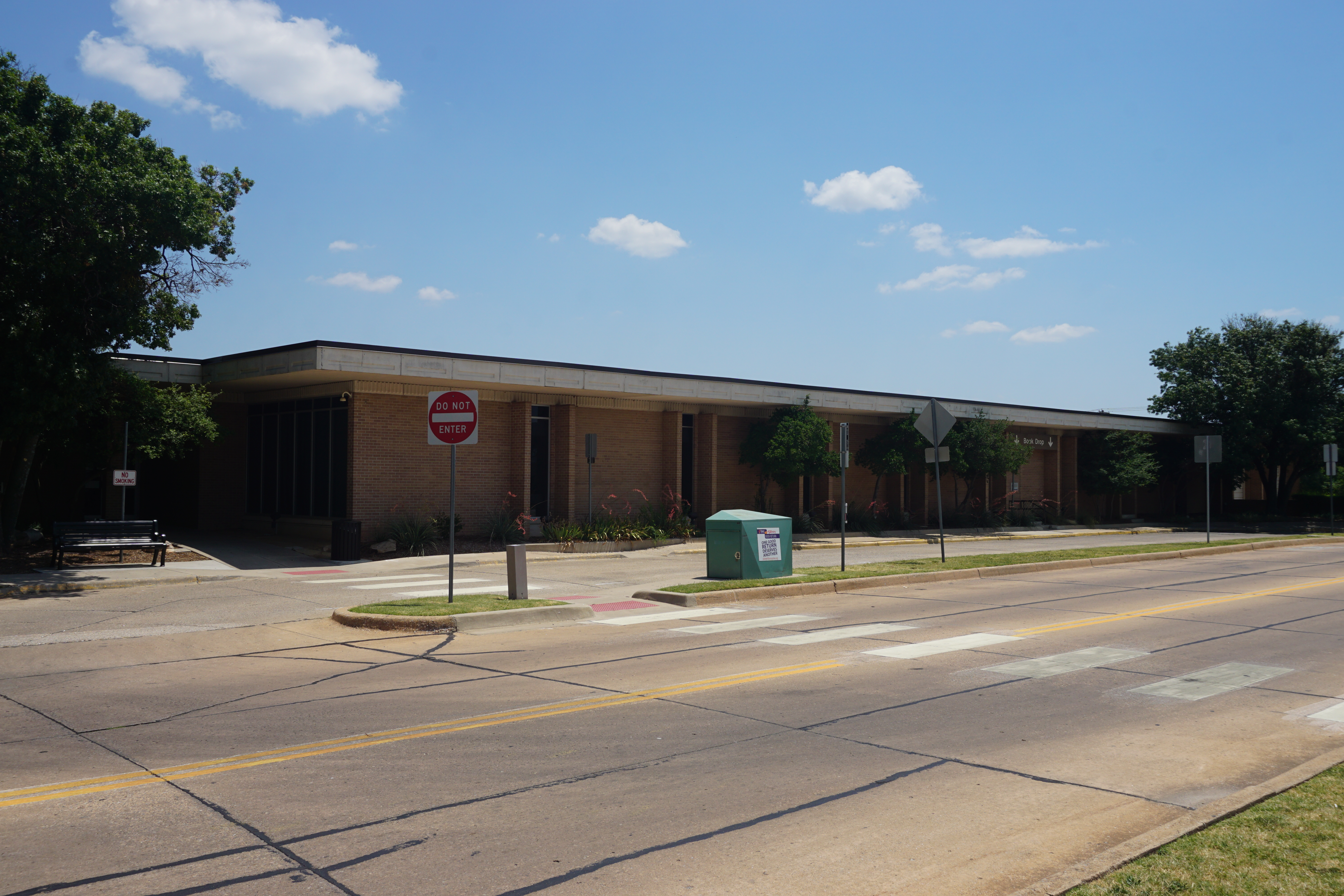
Former Norman Public Library Central, 2019

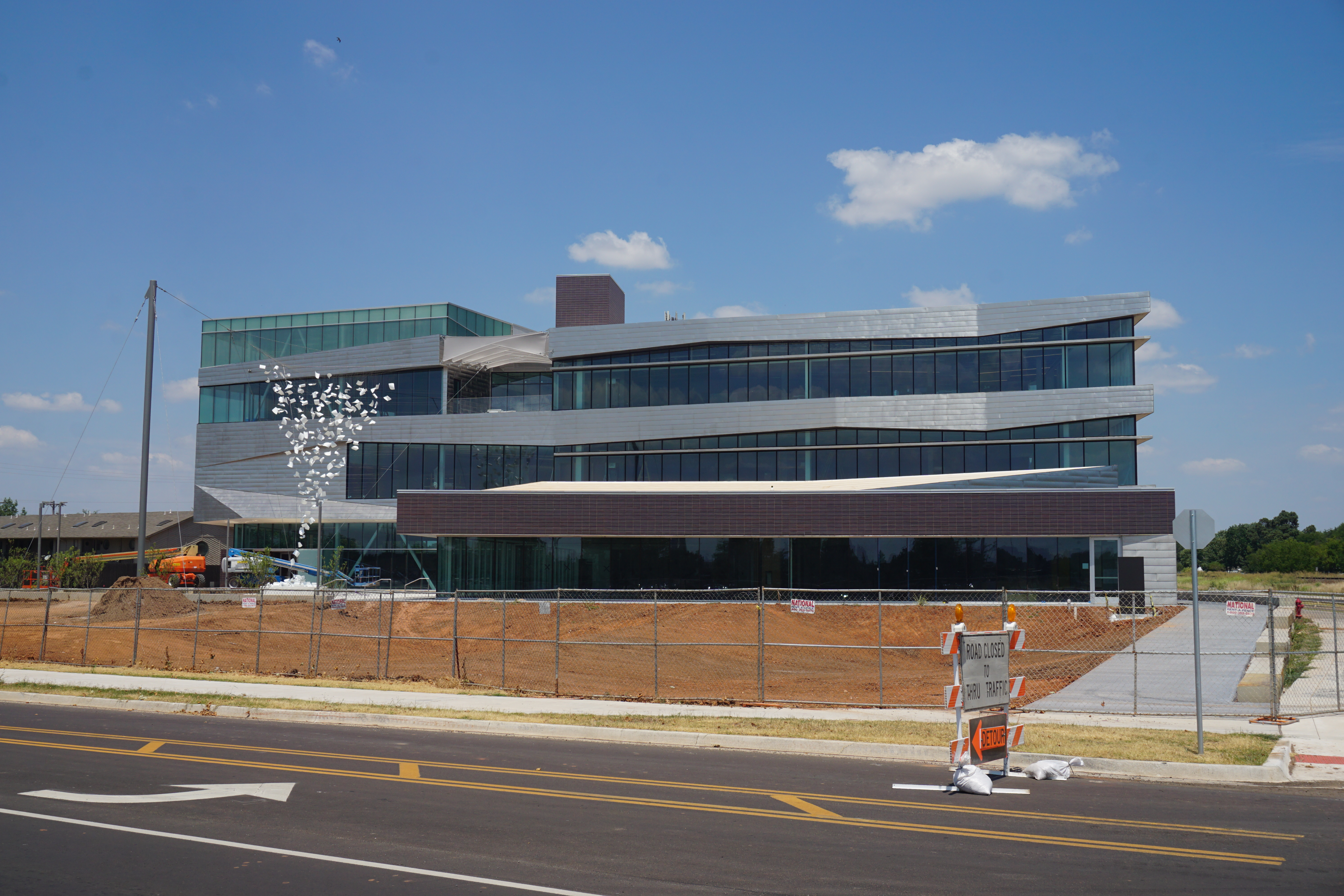
Norman Public Library Central under construction, 2019

The Pioneer Library System (PLS) is a public library system that serves residents in the central Oklahoma counties of Cleveland, Pottawatomie and McClain with administrative offices in Norman. Additionally, the system also allows those served by the Metropolitan Library System (Oklahoma County) to check out materials via a reciprocal borrowing agreement, and also allows non-residents to borrow materials if they pay an annual fee. The twelve-branch system is governed by a board of trustees. Lisa Wells currently serves as executive director.

The cities of Moore, Norman and Shawnee are served by Redbox-style automated DVD kiosks. Norman is also home to three "24 Hour Libraries" which are automated kiosks. The location at the Irving Recreation Center in Norman is the first such machine in North America to allow customers 24-hour access to library materials. Customers are able to retrieve "holds" from the kiosks or browse available books for checkout.

== Locations ==
Information about the system's administrative offices and branch libraries is shown below. For maps showing all locations, see the "External links" section.

Name	Address	Coordinates
Pioneer Library System Administration	300 Norman Center Court, Norman	35.2158°N 97.4905°W
Blanchard Public Library	205 NE 10th, Blanchard	35.1466°N 97.6568°W
Library Lab: A Pop-Up Community Place	121 S Santa Fe, Norman	35.2195°N 97.4473°W
McLoud Public Library	133 N Main, McLoud	35.4365°N 97.0919°W
Moore Public Library	225 S Howard, Moore	35.3360°N 97.4890°W
Newcastle Public Library	705 NW 10th, Newcastle	35.2560°N 97.6076°W
Noble Public Library	204 N 5th, Noble	35.1413°N 97.3919°W
Norman Public Library Central (indefinitely closed)	103 W Acres, Norman	35.2260°N 97.4479°W
Norman Public Library East	3051 Alameda St, Norman	35.2186°N 97.3957°W
Norman Public Library West	300 Norman Center Court, Norman	35.2158°N 97.4905°W
Purcell Public Library	919 N 9th, Purcell	35.0230°N 97.3716°W
Shawnee Public Library	101 N Philadelphia, Shawnee	35.3274°N 96.9196°W
Southwest OKC Public Library	2201 SW 134th, Oklahoma City	35.3348°N 97.5499°W
Tecumseh Public Library	114 N Broadway, Tecumseh	35.2582°N 96.9368°W

== See also ==
- Metropolitan Library System (Oklahoma) – Covers Oklahoma County
