= Chickasha Street Railway =

Electrified trolley service in Chickasha, Oklahoma, USA

Overview
- Headquarters: Chickasha
- Locale: Oklahoma
- Dates of operation: 1910–1927

Technical
- Track gauge: 4 ft 8 1/2 in (1,435 mm) standard gauge
- Length: 6.5 miles (10.5 km)

The Chickasha Street Railway (“CSR”) was the local electrified trolley service in Chickasha, Oklahoma between 1910 and 1927. At its maximum, it had 6.5 miles of track.

== History ==
The Chickasha Street Railway Co. was incorporated under Oklahoma law on February 1, 1910. The original plan was to link Chickasha with other towns in Grady County. However, the system as built, which was put in operation on July 12, 1910, was considerably shorter. The standard-gauge line ran from the depot for the Chicago, Rock Island and Pacific Railroad down Chickasha Avenue and over to the Oklahoma College for Women, with a spur later built to the baseball park, about 6.5 miles in total. It utilized seven electric trolley cars. Three of the seven were purchased secondhand from the Boston Electric Railway, two of which had been built as horsecars in 1889 and converted for electric railway use, and the other constructed in 1892.

The CSR had its share of accidents, ranging from a trolley hitting a mule-drawn wagon to a patron being injured upon alighting from a streetcar. In one incident in 1913, a streetcar struck a three-year-old who had run in front of it, which knocked the youngster between the tracks before the trolley drove over him. Despite the car having just 5-1/2” of clearance, the child was rescued with minor scratches.

As automobiles came in during the 1920’s, the CSR’s revenue started to decline, going from $21,911 in 1923, to $17,897 in 1924, and to $16,262 in 1925. Rail service ended in August 1927 in favor of buses, which had been initially introduced two years earlier.
