= IBM 2991 =

Blood treatment machine developed by IBM

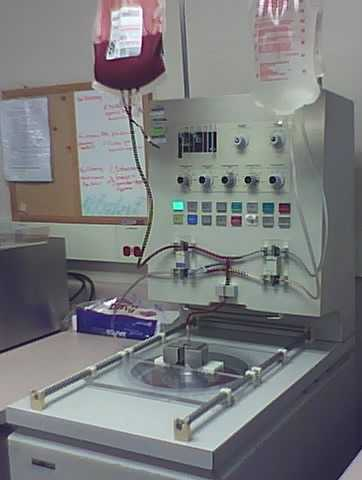
The IBM 2991 cell washer

The IBM 2991 Blood Cell Processor was a blood cell washer developed by IBM Systems Development Division in Endicott, New York. It was first marketed by IBM Information Records Division (IRD) in 1972. The processor washed fresh blood or frozen, thawed blood. In the case of frozen, thawed blood, the blood was washed to remove the cryogenic agent, typically, glycerol.

== History and development ==
In 1964, IBM received a grant from the National Cancer Institute (NCI) of the National Institutes of Health (NIH). This was a result of an IBM engineer, George T. Judson, requesting to work on a continuous-flow blood centrifuge. He had observed the need for such a machine when visiting NCI in 1962 after his son was diagnosed with leukemia. As a result of this work, IBM developed the NCI-IBM Blood Cell Separator which was announced in 1965. At that announcement, Judson and his co-worker Alan Jones were approached by Dr. James R. Pert, Director of the American Red Cross Blood Research program in Washington, D.C. He told them of the need for a machine to separate packed red cells from glycerol. The glycerol is added to the red cells to protect the cells during freezing. The processor was announced in September 1972 at the American Association of Blood Banks (AABB) in Washington, D.C.

The Information Records Division of IBM were responsible for the manufacture and marketing of supplies for IBMs data processing machines, such as punched cards, business forms, magnetic tape, disk packs and data modules. By the 1970s this business was declining, as IBM's concentration increasingly turned to computing. Accordingly, the vice president in charge of IRD, Everett "Van" Van Hoesen, searched for new business that could be slotted into IRD.

Searching for these new products Van started a campaign to win the first (2991) product 'mission', though IRD did not have any significant history of machine production. One key factor, though, was that the products being tendered for also comprised a substantial element of on-going income from the related supplies. In the case of the blood products the annual supplies income could easily run at a rate approaching the capital value of the machine. It was a situation that was familiar to IRD, brought up on the similar philosophy inherent in the punched card business and Van won the mission.

IRD subsequently also added the IBM 2997 Blood Cell Separator to its line of products. The 2991 was manufactured at IRDs Dayton, N. J plant. IBM reports that the first 2991 they sold was to Blood Services in Scottsdale, Arizona, a large network of nonprofit community blood centers.

By 1978 the 2991, the 2997 and the 5880 were all being sold by IBM Biomedical Systems.

=== Think Magazine articles ===
The 2991 appeared in at least two IBM Think Magazine articles:

- In the April 1976 edition, IBM reported that in 1975 a Houston based marketing rep called Mike Gold sold 21 Blood Cell Processors for more than half a million US dollars.
- In the June 1978 edition, IBM wrote that a new model of the 2991 had been announced in 1976 and how IBM were using two converted 26-foot-long, 8-foot-wide motor homes to demonstrate the machine in hospital carparks. Each was equipped with two 2991s with one processor positioned where the dining table had stood and the other replacing the lounge. It quoted the selling price of a 2991 as being between $10,000 and $17,000 USD.

=== Usage by the former Shah of Iran ===
After the former Shah travelled to Panama in 1979, oncologist Dr. Jeane Hester of the M. D. Anderson Hospital and Tumor Institute in Houston was engaged to help treat his cancer and convinced IBM to supply an IBM 2991 blood cell washer and an IBM 2997 blood cell separator to support this. IBM sent an engineer named Pete Greco to install the machines, but on arrival at Gorgas Hospital he found the 2997 was missing a pump mounting pin. After Hester and Greco tried to repair the machine without it, Greco had to fly back to Miami to get the required part. While they then succeeded in getting the machine working, the surgery was postponed following a dispute between the American and Panamanian medical teams over who would control the operation. This was not resolved and the former Shah later left for Egypt.

== Methodology ==
The machine works by spinning a unit of blood in its centrifuge with various concentrations of saline solution. The machine spins the red cells in a circular bag and then uses a hydraulic system to express out saline, plasma, glycerol used in the freezing process, and unwanted plasma proteins. The process also resulted in a reduction in allergic reactions and fevers.

The blood is washed in a special, single-use washing kit with a circular bag and five tubing lines branching from a central tube from the circular bag. These lines are inserted into the unit of blood to be processed, saline solutions, or an attached waste bag. The washed blood can be labeled in the circular bag or transferred into a more traditionally shaped blood storage bag. Because the washing process creates an open system, red blood cells washed with this machine expire after 24 hours when kept at 1-6 °C and platelets after 4 hours when kept at 20-24 °C.

== Current use ==
In 1984, IBM Biomedical Systems announced they were selling IBM’s blood-processing equipment and assets to Cobe Laboratories. The machine is now manufactured and supported by Terumo BCT and sold as the COBE® 2991 cell Processor. It is still in use as of 2025 in blood banks for washing red blood cell units, however Terumo has announced that the machine, and its disposable supplies, is sunsetting by the year 2029.
