= Chickasha, Oklahoma =

- City
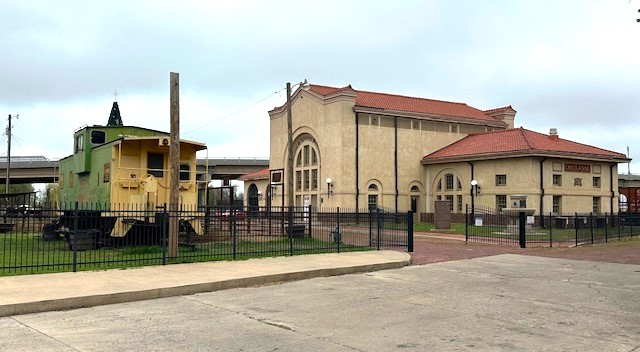
- Former Rock Island Depot in March 2025

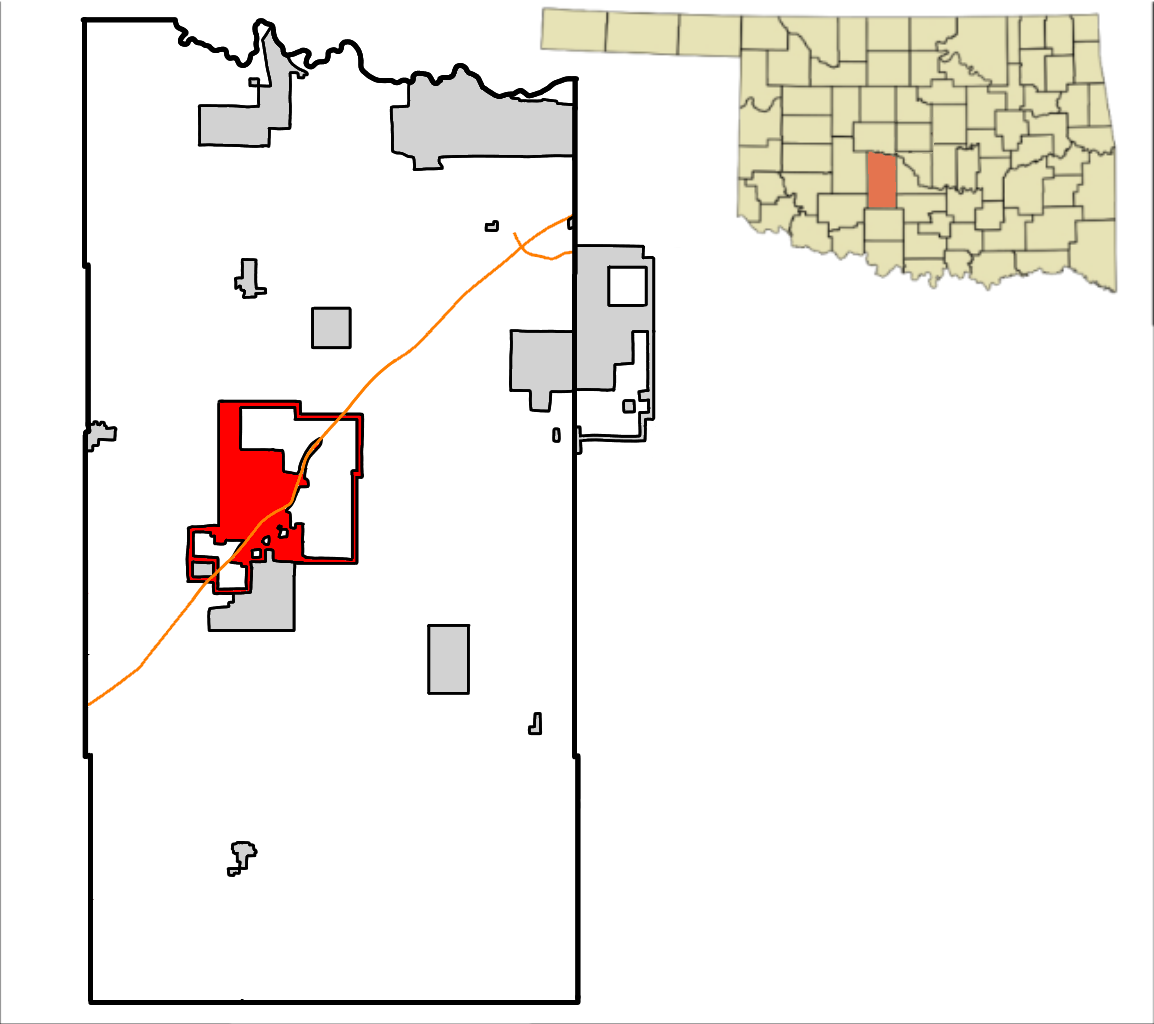
- Chickasha city limits on Grady County

- Location in the United States
- Coordinates: 35°02′28″N 97°56′50″W
- Country: United States
- State: Oklahoma
- County: Grady

Government
  - Mayor: Zachary Grayson

Area
  - Total: 22.48 sq mi (58.23 km^{2})
  - Land: 22.44 sq mi (58.11 km^{2})
  - Water: 0.046 sq mi (0.12 km^{2})
- Elevation: 1,112 ft (339 m)

Population (2022)
  - Total: 16,051
  - Density: 715.5/sq mi (276.24/km^{2})
- Time zone: UTC-6 (Central (CST))
  - Summer (DST): UTC-5 (CDT)
- ZIP Codes: 73018, 73023
- Area code: 405
- FIPS code: 40-13950
- GNIS feature ID: 2409446
- Website: www.chickasha.gov

Chickasha (/ˈtʃɪkəʃeɪ/ CHIK-ə-shay) is a city in and the county seat of Grady County, Oklahoma, United States. Its population was 16,051 at the 2020 census, a 0.1% increase from 2010.

== History ==
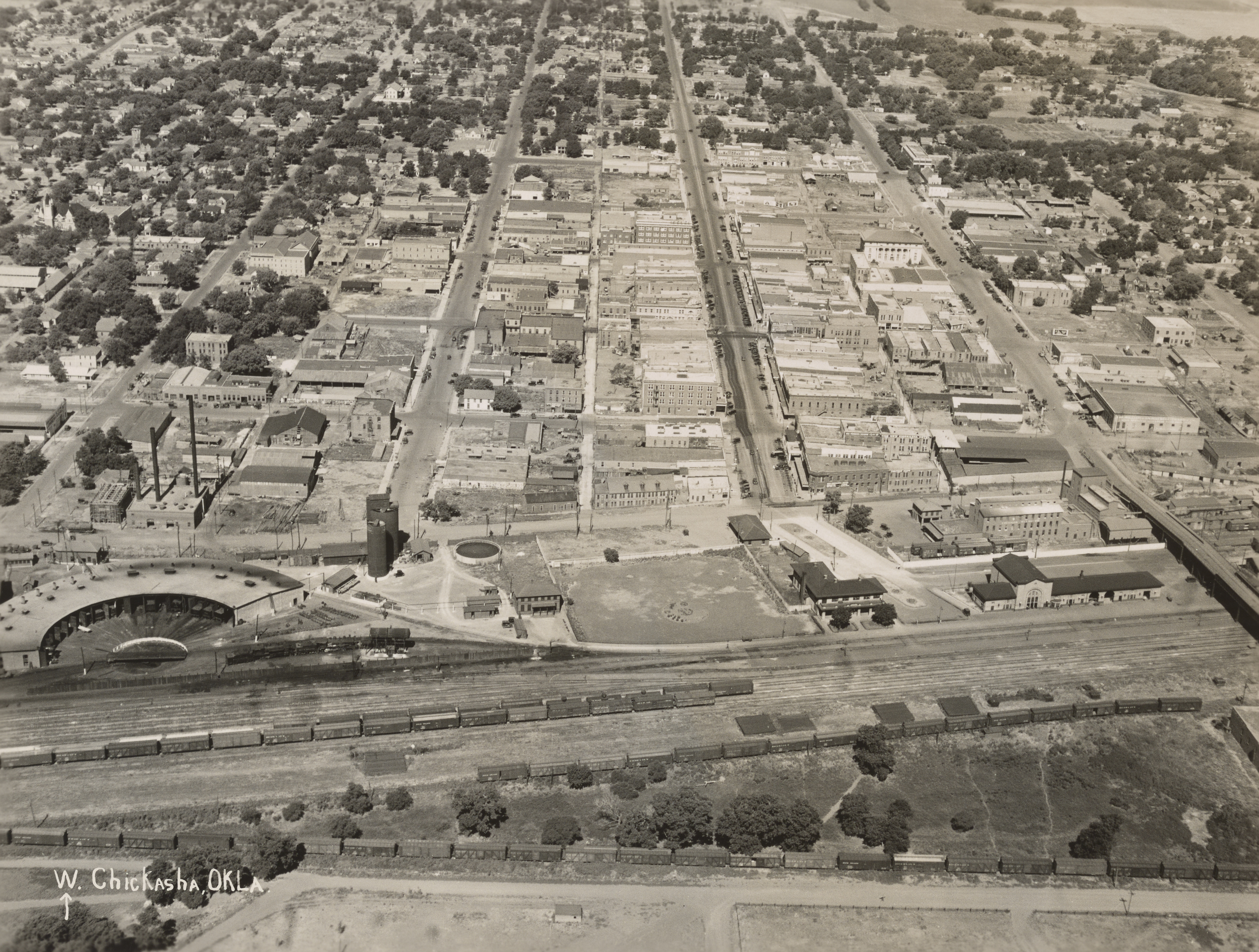
Chickasha in 1927

Chickasha was founded by Hobart Johnstone Whitley, a land developer, banker, farmer, and Chicago, Rock Island and Pacific Railway (Rock Island) executive. At the time of its founding, Chickasha was located in Pontotoc County, Chickasaw Nation. The founding took place in 1892 when the Rock Island built a track through Indian Territory. A post office was established in June 1892. One of the earliest industrial plants to come to Chickasha was the Chickasha Cotton Oil Company, which was established in 1899. The town incorporated in 1902. From 1910 to 1927, the town was served by the Chickasha Street Railway, the town's own electric trolley system.

In 1908, the Oklahoma Industrial Institute and College for Girls was established in Chickasha. A local rancher named J. B. Sparks donated land for the school in memory of his daughter, Nellie. The girl was a Chickasaw descendant, and the land had been part of her allotment. The Nellie Sparks Dormitory commemorated her. The school was renamed as the Oklahoma College for Women in 1916. It became co-educational in 1965, and was renamed the Oklahoma College of Liberal Arts. It was renamed again in 1975 as the University of Science and Arts of Oklahoma.

The Wilson and Bonfis Flying School opened in October 1941 to train cadets of the U.S. Army Air Force. Over 8000 cadets completed training there during World War II. After the war, the facility became the Chickasha Municipal Airport.

Also during the war, the army built and used Borden General Hospital. This site now contains Grady Memorial Hospital, Five Oaks Medical Group, Southern Plains Medical Center, and Borden Park.

A prisoner-of-war camp established in 1944 is now the site of the Grady County Fairgrounds.

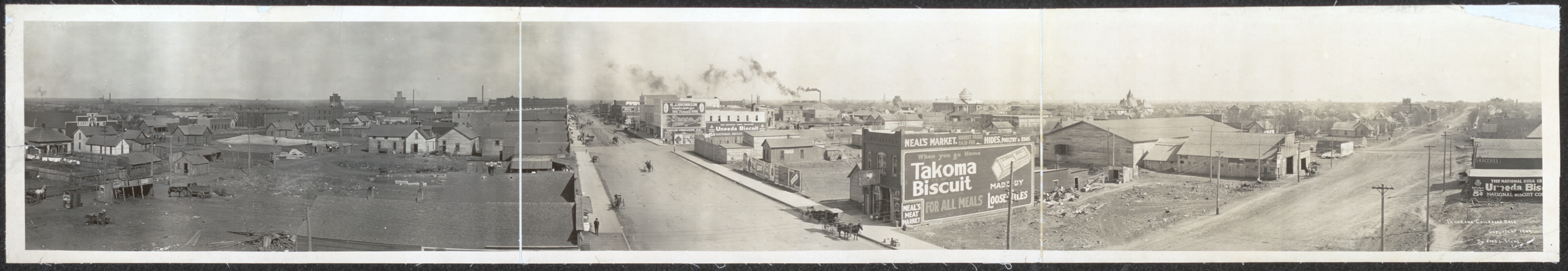
Chickasha, 1909

== Geography ==
Chickasha is located west of the center of Grady County and is 42 miles (68 km) southwest of Oklahoma City, which is accessible via Interstate 44 (the H. E. Bailey Turnpike). I-44 passes through the southeastern side of the city, with access from exits 80 and 83, and leads southwest 47 miles (76 km) to Lawton. U.S. Route 62 runs through the city as Choctaw Avenue, leading east and then northeast 18 miles (29 km) to Blanchard and west 18 miles to Anadarko. U.S. Route 81 passes through the city center, leading south 40 miles (64 km) to Duncan and north 35 miles (56 km) to El Reno. U.S. Route 277 enters Chickasha from the south with US 81 and leaves to the east with US 62.

Line Creek passes through the north part of the city and flows into the Washita River about one mile northeast of the city.

According to the United States Census Bureau, the city has a total area of 22.1 square miles (57.2 km^{2}), of which 0.04 square miles (0.1 km^{2}), or 0.22%, is covered by water. The Washita River flows through the northern end of the city, then turns south and forms part of the city's eastern border.

== Climate ==
According to the Köppen climate classification, Chickasha has a humid subtropical climate, Cfa on climate maps. The hottest temperature recorded in was 116 °F (46.7 °C) on July 30, 1910, and August 11, 1936, while the coldest temperature recorded was −12 °F (−24.4 °C) on December 23, 1989.

Climate data for Chickasha, Oklahoma, 1991–2020 normals, extremes 1953–present
Month	Jan	Feb	Mar	Apr	May	Jun	Jul	Aug	Sep	Oct	Nov	Dec	Year
Record high °F (°C)	85 (29)	90 (32)	99 (37)	102 (39)	107 (42)	112 (44)	111 (44)	113 (45)	110 (43)	103 (39)	90 (32)	85 (29)	113 (45)
Mean maximum °F (°C)	70.3 (21.3)	76.3 (24.6)	83.6 (28.7)	88.1 (31.2)	95.4 (35.2)	98.4 (36.9)	103.0 (39.4)	102.2 (39.0)	97.4 (36.3)	89.3 (31.8)	79.4 (26.3)	70.9 (21.6)	104.7 (40.4)
Mean daily maximum °F (°C)	53.5 (11.9)	57.7 (14.3)	66.6 (19.2)	75.9 (24.4)	83.5 (28.6)	91.1 (32.8)	96.7 (35.9)	95.3 (35.2)	88.0 (31.1)	77.3 (25.2)	64.5 (18.1)	54.3 (12.4)	75.4 (24.1)
Daily mean °F (°C)	40.2 (4.6)	44.1 (6.7)	52.9 (11.6)	62.2 (16.8)	71.2 (21.8)	79.2 (26.2)	83.9 (28.8)	82.6 (28.1)	75.0 (23.9)	63.5 (17.5)	51.4 (10.8)	42.0 (5.6)	62.4 (16.9)
Mean daily minimum °F (°C)	26.8 (−2.9)	30.4 (−0.9)	39.2 (4.0)	48.4 (9.1)	58.8 (14.9)	67.3 (19.6)	71.0 (21.7)	69.9 (21.1)	61.9 (16.6)	49.7 (9.8)	38.2 (3.4)	29.7 (−1.3)	49.3 (9.6)
Mean minimum °F (°C)	10.0 (−12.2)	13.2 (−10.4)	21.2 (−6.0)	29.9 (−1.2)	42.4 (5.8)	54.9 (12.7)	61.1 (16.2)	58.8 (14.9)	43.4 (6.3)	32.2 (0.1)	21.0 (−6.1)	11.2 (−11.6)	4.8 (−15.1)
Record low °F (°C)	−11 (−24)	−3 (−19)	6 (−14)	19 (−7)	29 (−2)	46 (8)	52 (11)	48 (9)	33 (1)	14 (−10)	5 (−15)	−12 (−24)	−12 (−24)
Average precipitation inches (mm)	1.39 (35)	1.61 (41)	2.61 (66)	4.05 (103)	5.02 (128)	4.39 (112)	2.85 (72)	3.46 (88)	3.72 (94)	3.32 (84)	2.17 (55)	2.01 (51)	36.60 (930)
Average snowfall inches (cm)	1.5 (3.8)	0.3 (0.76)	0.5 (1.3)	0.0 (0.0)	0.0 (0.0)	0.0 (0.0)	0.0 (0.0)	0.0 (0.0)	0.0 (0.0)	0.1 (0.25)	0.6 (1.5)	1.7 (4.3)	4.7 (11.91)
Average precipitation days (≥ 0.01 in)	4.6	5.0	6.3	7.1	9.3	7.9	5.1	5.9	6.7	6.4	5.5	5.4	75.2
Average snowy days (≥ 0.1 in)	0.6	0.4	0.3	0.0	0.0	0.0	0.0	0.0	0.0	0.0	0.3	0.8	2.4
Source 1: NOAA
Source 2: National Weather Service (mean maxima/minima 1981–2010)

== Demographics ==
Historical population
Census	Pop.	Note	%±
1900	3,209		—
1910	10,320		221.6%
1920	10,179		−1.4%
1930	14,099		38.5%
1940	14,111		0.1%
1950	15,842		12.3%
1960	14,886		−6.0%
1970	14,194		−4.6%
1980	15,828		11.5%
1990	14,988		−5.3%
2000	15,850		5.8%
2010	16,036		1.2%
2020	16,051		0.1%

=== 2020 census ===
As of the 2020 census, Chickasha had a population of 16,051. The median age was 36.4 years; 21.7% of the residents were under 18 and 16.6% were 65 or older. For every 100 females, there were 96.1 males, and for every 100 females 18 and over, there were 94.1 males 18 and over.

About 94.7% of residents lived in urban areas, while 5.3% lived in rural areas.

Of the 6,035 households in Chickasha, 29.7% had children under 18 living in them, 41.4% were married-couple households, 19.3% were households with a male householder and no spouse or partner present, and 31.8% were households with a female householder and no spouse or partner present. About 31.5% of all households were made up of individuals, and 15.0% had someone living alone who was 65 or older.

The city had 7,302 housing units, of which 17.4% were vacant. Among occupied housing units, 55.0% were owner-occupied and 45.0% were renter-occupied. The homeowner vacancy rate was 3.1% and the rental vacancy rate was 17.3%.

Racial composition as of the 2020 census
Race	Percentage
White	72.5%
Black or African American	7.0%
American Indian and Alaska Native	6.3%
Asian	0.5%
Native Hawaiian and other Pacific Islander	0.1%
Some other race	2.7%
Two or more races	11.0%
Hispanic or Latino (of any race)	9.2%

=== 2022 American Community Survey estimates ===
According to the 2022 American Community Survey Five-Year Estimates, 16,231 people, 6,222 households, and 3,773 families were residing in the city, with 7,585 housing units.

Of the 6,222 households, 30.68% had children under 18 living with them, 52.03% were married couples living together, and 39.36% were not families. About 69.32% of all households were made up of individuals. The average household size was 2.5, and the average family size was 2.95.

The age distribution was 22.8% under 18, 14% from 18 to 24, 28% from 25 to 44, 24% from 45 to 64, and 11% who were 65 or older. The median age was 36.4 years. For every 100 females, there were 96.3 males.

According to the 2022 American Community Survey, the median income for a household in the city was $55,136 and for a family was $74,629. The per capita income for the city was $31,688. About 17.5% of the population were below the poverty line, including 23% of those under 18 and 10% of those 65 or over.

In terms of educational attainment, 88.9% of residents 25 and older had at least a high school diploma, and 19.4% had a bachelor's degree or higher. The majority of employed residents worked in private companies (72.39%), followed by government workers (15.58%), and self-employed individuals (8.23%).

== Economy ==
Agriculture, particularly wheat production and cattle raising, have been important to the city's economy since its earliest days. Manufacturing became important about the middle of the 20th century. ArvinMeritor Replacement Parts and Delta Faucet opened facilities in the 1970s.

== Arts and culture ==
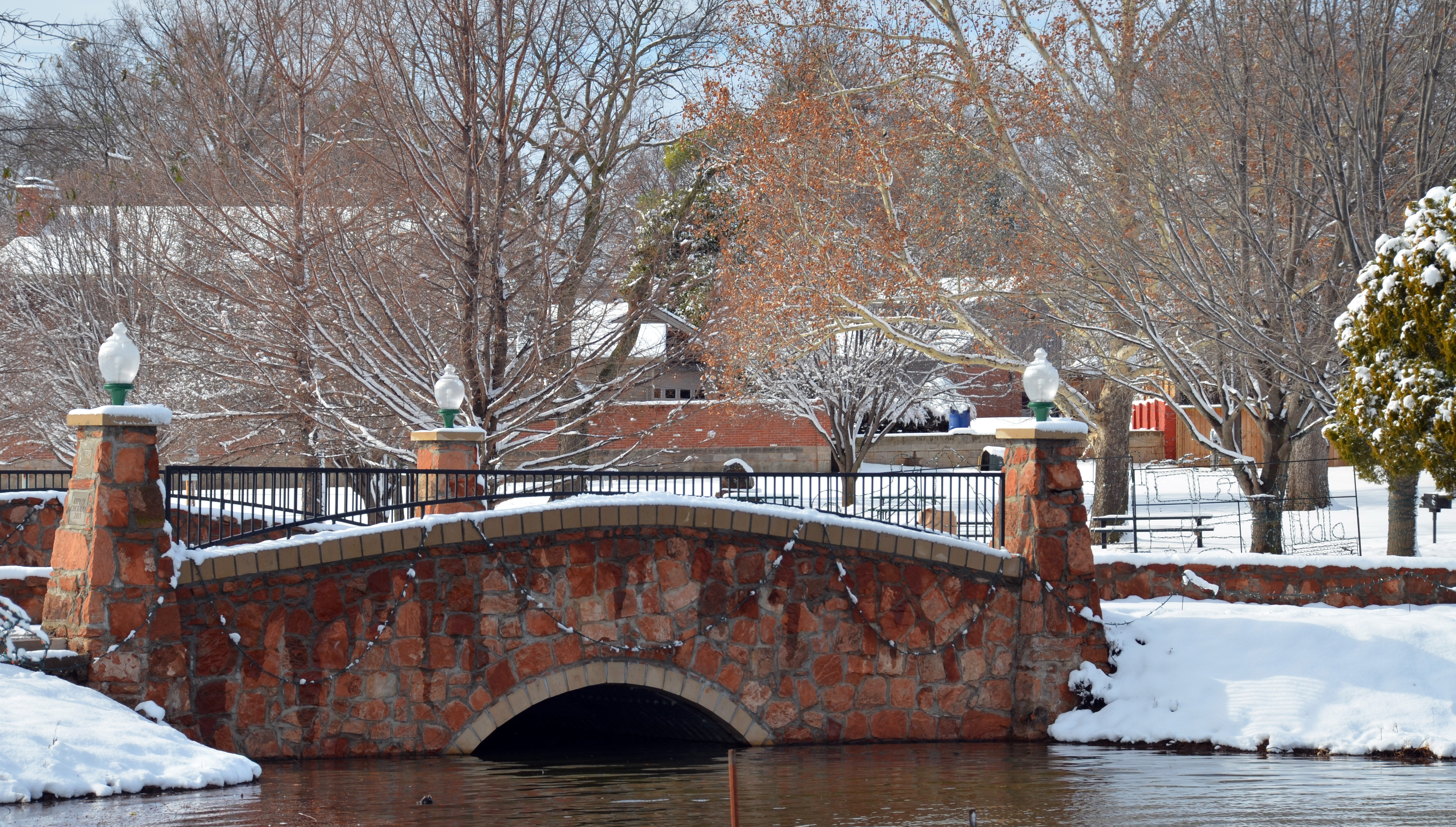
Shannon Springs Park during the Annual Festival of Light

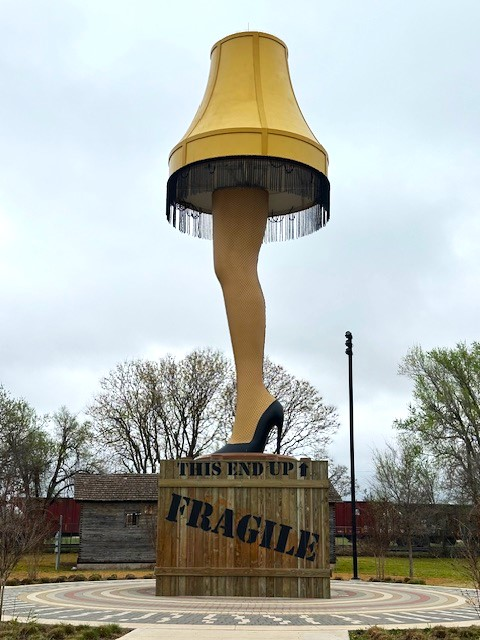
Leg lamp statue, in the manner of the leg lamp in 'A Christmas Story', March 2025

The city's annual Festival of Light takes place at the 43-acre (170,000 m^{2}) Shannon Springs Park and opens nightly from around Thanksgiving to the end of December. Concessions, carriage rides, pictures with Santa, and shopping are available. The Festival of Light has received many awards over the years, including Regional Event of the Year, A.B.A. Top 100 Event, National Top 25 Holiday Event, Festival of the Year, Best Community Festival Event, and Best Place to Take Out-of-Town Visitors. The festival has been featured statewide on Discover Oklahoma, ranked as a Top Place to Visit by Fine Living Network (2004), and designated as an official 2007 Oklahoma Centennial Event. Over 140 businesses and clubs sponsor the event in various ways. The installation of lights in 290 trees, 8 miles (13 km) of walk-ways, bridges, arbors, gazebos, and buildings begins in September; getting the lights taken down and stored away extends into March. More than 1,200 volunteers donate time and skill, and now Display Sponsors have reached the 100 mark. The park has over 3.5 million lights, and the crystal pedestrian bridge boasts over 75,000 lights alone. It draws together over 1000 local volunteers and more than 250,000 visitors from across the United States.

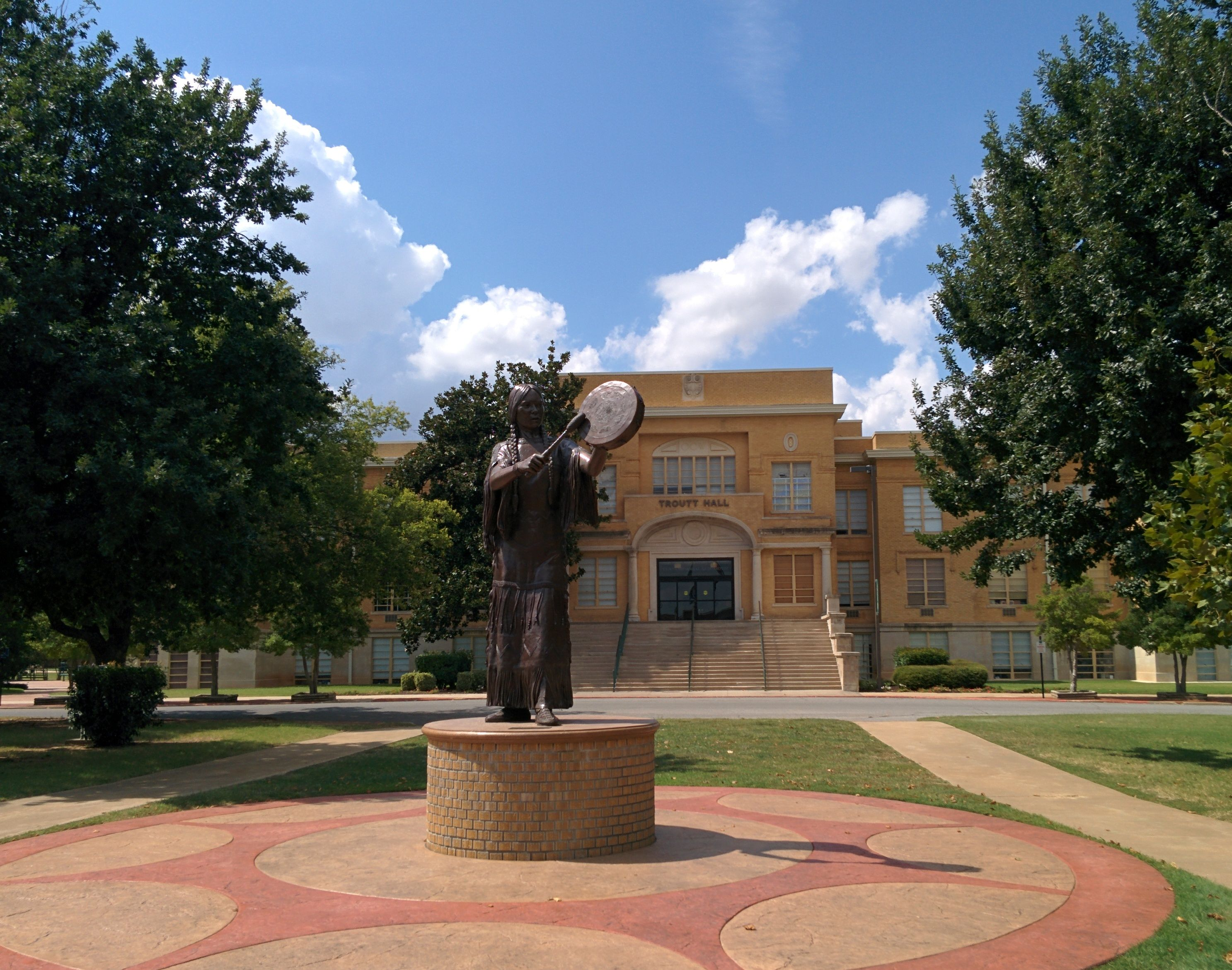
Te Ata statue in front of Trout Hall on the USAO campus

A leg lamp statue mimicking the one in A Christmas Story stands downtown since 2022 because former Chickasha native and University of Oklahoma Professor Noland Eugene James claimed he developed the leg lamp as a concept that later became the film’s iconic prop. Warner Bros. Discovery sent a cease-and-desist letter regarding the Chickasha display in 2025, but did not take further action. The story of the statue is covered in the 2025 documentary Fragilé.

The University of Science and Arts of Oklahoma hosts an annual festival, the Spring Triad, which is made up of the Montmartre Chalk Art Festival, the Droverstock Music Festival, and the Scholastic Meet. The event is held annually on the first Thursday of April. The art festival is held around the USAO Oval, where over 700 artists compete in a chalk art contest. Droverstock features over 12 hours of live music from various bands of all styles and genres. There are also many vendors, inflatables, and activities associated with the festival. The Scholastic Meet attracts around 1000 students annually from over 50 Oklahoma counties who compete in academic disciplines such as math, science, music, history, and other subjects. The competition is the largest academic meet in the state. Overall, the day-long event attracts thousands into the community.

The Muscle Car Ranch located on the southern edge of Chickasha hosts an annual swap meet and concert, which is held in August. The ranch, located on 70 acres (280,000 m^{2}) of a 1900s dairy farm, features hundreds of nostalgic advertisements and memorabilia representing the last 75 years of American history. The concert has featured rock-and-roll groups such as the Byrds, the Grass Roots, Paul Revere & the Raiders, Jefferson Airplane, the Lovin' Spoonful, Firefall, John Conlee, Dr. Hook, and Bad Company.

From a small local swapmeet, the Chickasha Pre-war Swap Meet has evolved to be one of the significant swapmeets for owners and collectors of cars from before 1942 (World War II). According to numerous posts in the forum of the Model T Club of America, the Chickasha Pre-war Swap Meet is considered the best Ford Model T swapmeet in the US.

== Parks and recreation ==
Lake Chickasha is a city-owned lake located northwest of town in neighboring Caddo County. It offers recreation such as swimming, boating, and water sports, as well as hiking, camping, and playground usage.

Shannon Springs Park has a splash pad and pool, free fishing for those under 16 or over 65, playground equipment, an outdoor amphitheater, pavilions, and more. Events are held here such as the annual Festival of Lights.

The Chickasha Sports Complex hosts regional baseball, softball, and soccer tournaments, as well as facilitating local games and practice sessions.

== Government ==
Chickasha has an elected mayor and city council, with a city manager on its staff.

== Education ==
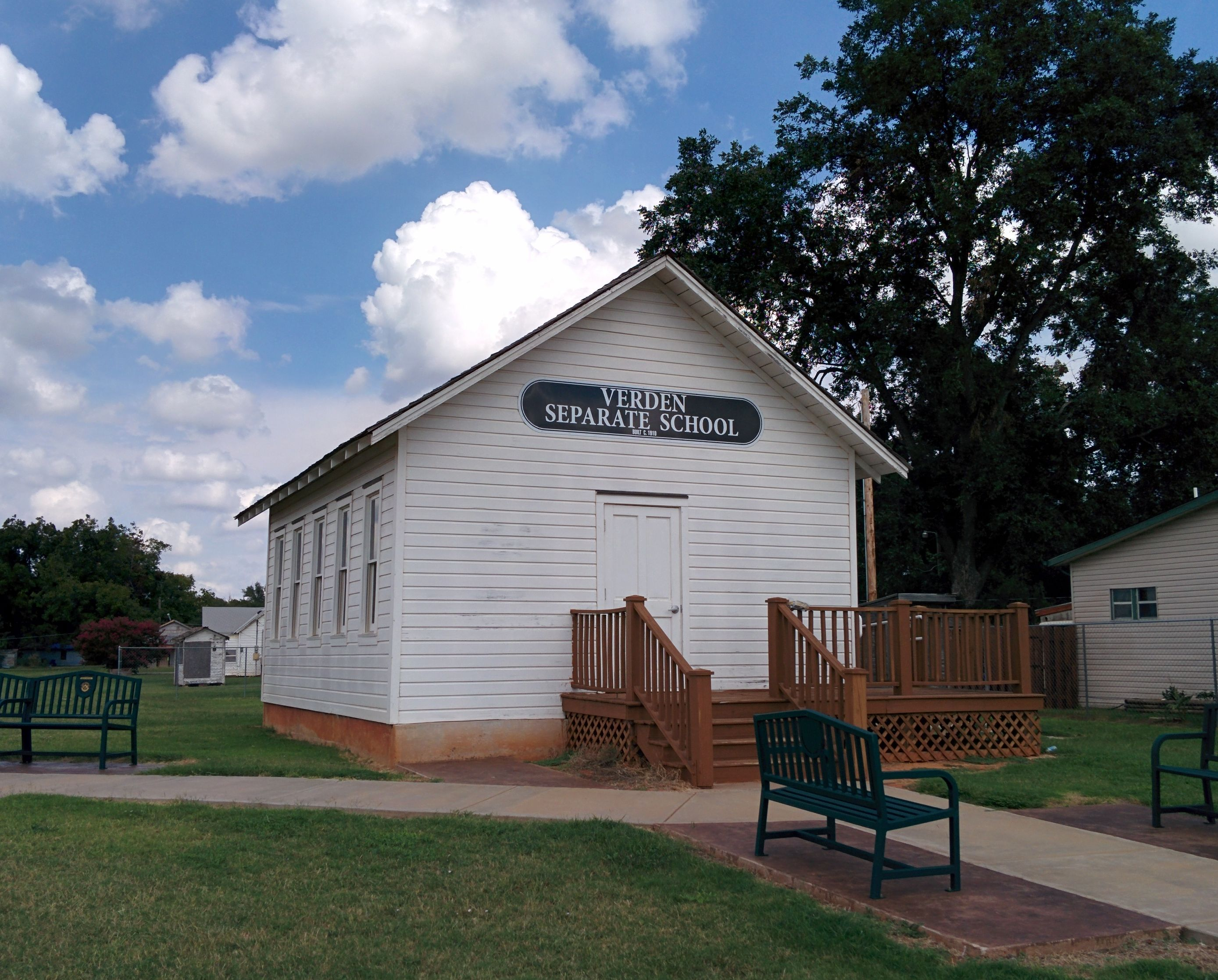
Verden Separate School in Chickasha

The majority of Chickasha is in the Chickasha Public Schools school district. Pieces to the south are in the Ninnekah Public Schools school district, and some road territory goes into some other school districts.

Chickasha Public School District includes Chickasha High School, Chickasha Middle School, Lincoln Elementary, Grand Elementary, and the Bill Wallace Early Childhood Center.

A branch of Washita Valley Head Start and Washita Valley Early Head Start provides education for young children near or below the poverty line before prekindergarten.

Chickasha is the current location of a historic schoolhouse that served black children in Grady County. Verden Separate School was built by African American Allen Toles on his own property in the nearby town of Verden in 1910. The school operated until 1935. The school building was rediscovered by historians in 2004 and restored and relocated to Chickasha. It was placed on the National Register of Historic Places in 2005.

A branch of Canadian Valley Technology Center provides vocational and community education in Chickasha.

The University of Science and Arts of Oklahoma, Oklahoma's public liberal arts college, is located in Chickasha. It was founded in 1908 by the Oklahoma State Legislature as Oklahoma Industrial Institute and College for Girls. The school's name was officially changed to Oklahoma College for Women in 1916. In 1965, the school became coeducational, and its name was changed to Oklahoma College of Liberal Arts. The school is currently known as the University of Science and Arts of Oklahoma.

== Infrastructure ==
=== Transportation ===
Chickasha is served by Interstate 44, US Route 62, US Route 81, US Route 277, US Route 62, State 39, State 19, and State 92.

Chickasha Municipal Airport (KCHK; FAA ID CHK), owned by the city and about 3 miles northwest, has multiple runways, the longest of which is 5101 ft by 100 ft and concrete-surfaced.

Commercial air transportation is available at Will Rogers World Airport, about 38 miles northeast.

Rail freight service is provided by Union Pacific, which honors Chickasha as a "Train Town USA", one of 131 communities out of the 7,300 communities it serves, because of the town's unique, long-standing relationship with the railroad.

== Notable people ==
- Stephen Alexander, American football tight end who played for the Washington Redskins
- Patricia Barchas, anthropologist from Stanford University who created the academic field of social neuroscience
- Dudley Dickerson, actor and comedian
- Dane Evans, professional Canadian Football League quarterback
- Ada Lois Sipuel Fisher, African-American lawyer, administrator, and activist
- Shug Fisher, Western film and TV character actor, singer, songwriter, comedian, and member of the Sons of the Pioneers
- Jeane Porter Hester, cancer researcher and co-developer of the IBM 2997 computerized blood cell separator
- Harry Franklin "Cowboy" Hill, college football player for the University of Oklahoma and professional player from 1923 to 1926
- Kendra Horn, congresswoman
- Terry Humphrey, Major League Baseball (MLB) player
- Jed Johnson, newspaper editor and politician, served as representative in the U.S. Congress
- Jed Johnson, Jr., son of Jed Johnson, U.S. representative from Oklahoma
- JaCoby Jones, MLB player, outfielder for the Detroit Tigers
- Merle Kilgore, country music personality
- Cleavon Little, actor and comedian
- Jack McCracken, basketball player in the 1930s and 1940s
- Don McNeill, American tennis player
- Scott Meacham, Oklahoma politician
- Orville Moody, professional golfer
- Lee Pace, actor best known for his roles in The Hobbit and Guardians of the Galaxy
- Sam Rayburn, defensive tackle for the Philadelphia Eagles, San Francisco 49ers, and Miami Dolphins
- Leon Polk Smith, painter
- Randy Souders, artist born in Chickasha
- Robert Streb, PGA tour golfer
- Mary Frances Thompson (Te Ata Fisher), Chickasaw actress, attended USAO in Chickasha
- Kelby Tomlinson, MLB player with the San Francisco Giants from 2015 to 2018
- Bill Wallace, children's author; the Early Childhood Education Center in Chickasha bears his name
- Reggie Willits, former MLB player for the Los Angeles Angels
- Dean Wooldridge, prominent engineer in the aerospace industry
