= IBM 2997 =

Blood treatment machine developed by IBM

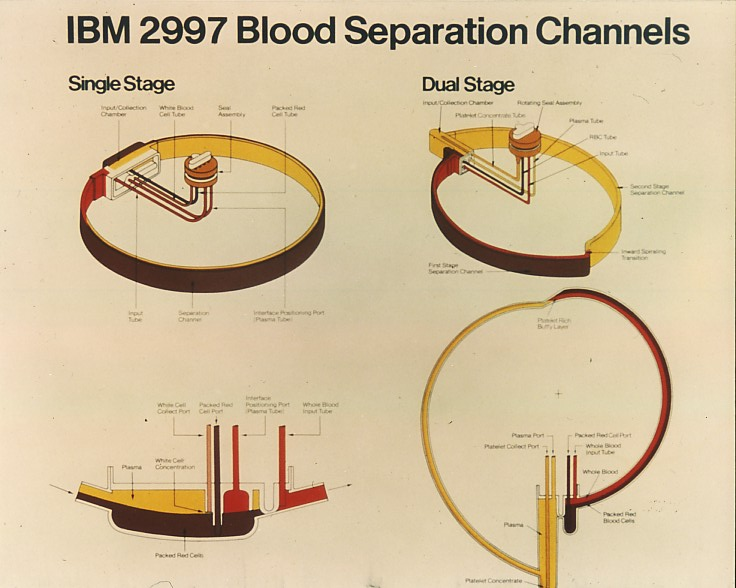
Schematic showing blood path for separating blood into components

== Development ==
The IBM 2997 Blood cell Separator was a biomedical device developed by IBM as a result of a personal tragedy of one of their development engineers, George Judson. In 1962, Judson's son, Tom, was diagnosed with leukemia. His physician was able to have Tom admitted to the Clinical Center of the National Cancer Institute (NCI) at the National Institutes of Health (NIH). On admission, they showed Judson a procedure to remove white blood cells from a patient. It was laborious. They would remove two units (450 ml) of blood, spin them in a bucket centrifuge, express the plasma into a satellite bag, and the white cells into another satellite bag. The packed red cells and the plasma would be recombined and administered to the patient. This would be repeated over and over. Judson, being an engineer, suggested that this could be done on a continuous-flow basis. He was sent to see Dr. Emil J. Freireich who expressed enthusiasm for the project. Judson returned to IBM and asked for a year's leave of absence to work on his ideas. IBM gave him the one-year leave with pay and provided engineering assistance.

Judson's work led to the development of the NCI Blood Cell Separator also known as the IBM 2990 Blood Cell Separator which could harvest white blood cells from blood donors, to support leukemia patients to keep them alive. It did however have a drawback which was that the blood path was not completely disposable. This led to the development of the IBM 2997, which switched the centrifuge bowl from an axial flow separator to one using circumferential flow geometry. The centrifuge bowl was essentially a continuous centrifuge which separated the blood into red blood cells, white blood cells, and blood plasma (used in plasmapheresis). The first version of the IBM 2997 was a single-stage channel instrument, while a later model used a dual-stage channel instrument that could obtain platelet concentrate with minimum lymphocyte contamination.

The IBM 2997 was picked up by IBM's Information Records Division (IRD) which was already ready marketing the IBM 2991 Blood cell Processor. The (disposable) supplies element represented a large part of the revenue stream.

== Product description ==
The IBM 2997 is a continuous-flow machine in which blood is drawn from a patient, mixed with anticoagulant and then passed through a rotating separation channel. Centrifugal force divides the blood into its components and a pump returns fluid continuously to the patient through a second venous line. There were three channels each with a different purpose:

- granulocyte collection
- platelet retrieval with minimal red cell and lymphocyte contamination
- the simultaneous removal of plasma and lymphocytes for therapeutic use.

Centrifuge speed and anticoagulant ratio are both operator-adjustable. The unit is portable and intended for bedside use.

=== Usage by the former Shah of Iran ===
After the former Shah travelled to Panama in 1979, oncologist Dr. Jeane Hester of the M. D. Anderson Hospital and Tumor Institute in Houston was engaged to help treat his cancer and convinced IBM to supply an IBM 2991 blood cell washer and an IBM 2997 blood cell separator to support this. IBM sent an engineer named Pete Greco to install the machines, but on arrival at Gorgas Hospital he found the 2997 was missing a pump mounting pin. After Hester and Greco tried to repair the machine without it, Greco had to fly back to Miami to get the required part. While they then succeeded in getting the machine working, the surgery was postponed following a dispute between the American and Panamanian medical teams over who would control the operation. This was not resolved and the former Shah later left for Egypt.

== Sale to Cobe Laboratories ==
In 1984 IBM sold their Biomedical Systems division, which including their blood-processing products and assets, to Cobe Laboratories. Production appears to have ceased the following year.
