= National Leadership Grants for Libraries =

Funding initiative

The National Leadership Grants for Libraries is a program of the Institute of Museum and Library Services. This program supports undertakings that tackle substantial challenges and opportunities facing the field of libraries and archives. The grant is awarded to projects that support new tools, research, and services that will be widely adopted or replicated within the field: this focus is meant to extend the benefits of federal investment.

== Project Categories ==
=== Community Anchors ===
Projects that develop the role of libraries as community anchors and encourage civic and cultural engagement, facilitate lifelong learning, promote digital inclusion, and support economic vitality through programming and services.

=== National Digital Platform ===
Programs that develop open source software applications used by libraries and archives across the United States to provide digital content and services.

=== Curating Collections ===
Initiatives that have a noteworthy national influence on shared services for the preservation and management of digital library collections.

== Funding Categories ==
=== Sparks Grants ===
Sparks Grants are relatively small awards for swift development and evaluation of improvements in library services resulting from innovation in tools, products, or organizational practices.

=== Planning Grants ===
Planning Grants provide the funding of initial organizational activities. These include actions such as needs analysis, feasibility studies, prototyping and pilot programs, or the establishment of partnerships.

=== National Forum Grants ===
National Forum Grants support group efforts, such as collaborations or partnerships. These efforts typically assemble subject matter experts (SMEs) and other significant participants, including contributors from related fields, to discuss matters of current significance to libraries and archives on a nation-wide scale.

=== Project Grants ===
Project Grants provide funding for projects that have passed the planning stages, and for which all planning activities have been completed. All projects in this category must have an identified national impact that includes partners from across the United States.

=== Research Grants ===
Research Grants support projects that address an area of concentration relating to libraries and archives. Projects that successfully apply for these grants are those that investigate significant questions or issues supplementing previously completed work.
