= Ronald J. Norick Downtown Library =

Library in Oklahoma City, Oklahoma, U.S.

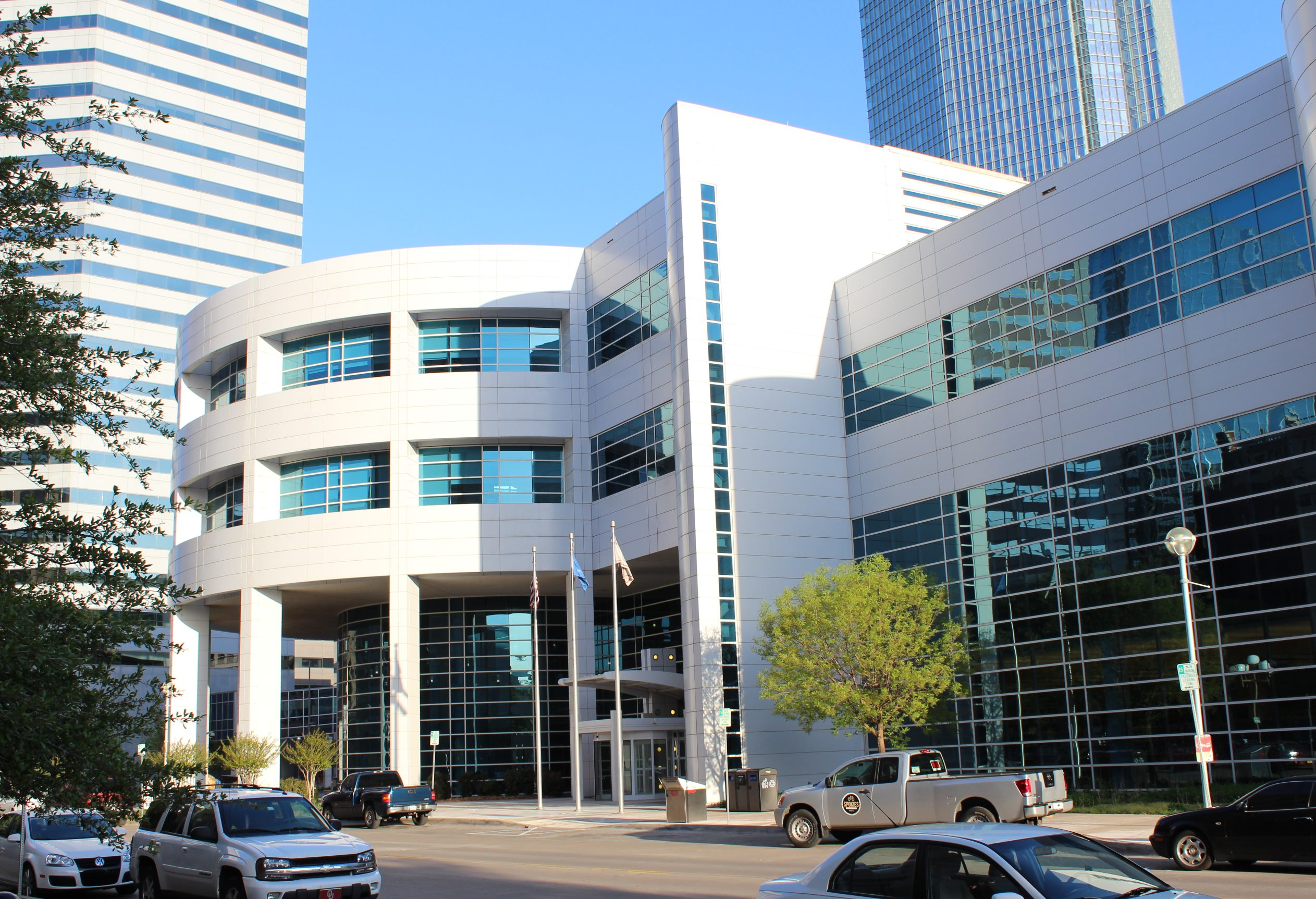
- The building's exterior in 2013
- 35°28′7″N 97°31′7″W
- Location: Oklahoma City, United States
- Type: Library

Other information
- Affiliation: Metropolitan Library System

The Ronald J. Norick Downtown Library is a library affiliated with the Metropolitan Library System in downtown Oklahoma City, in the U.S. state of Oklahoma. The four-story, 114,130 square-foot library, opened on August 17, 2004.

The building is named after former mayor Ron Norick, and cost approximately $21.5 million to construct. It replaced the former Main Public Library. An effort to stop rainwater from leaking into the building was completed in 2009.
