= Metropolitan Library System (Oklahoma) =

Education library system

Coordinates: 35°28′07″N 97°31′07″W

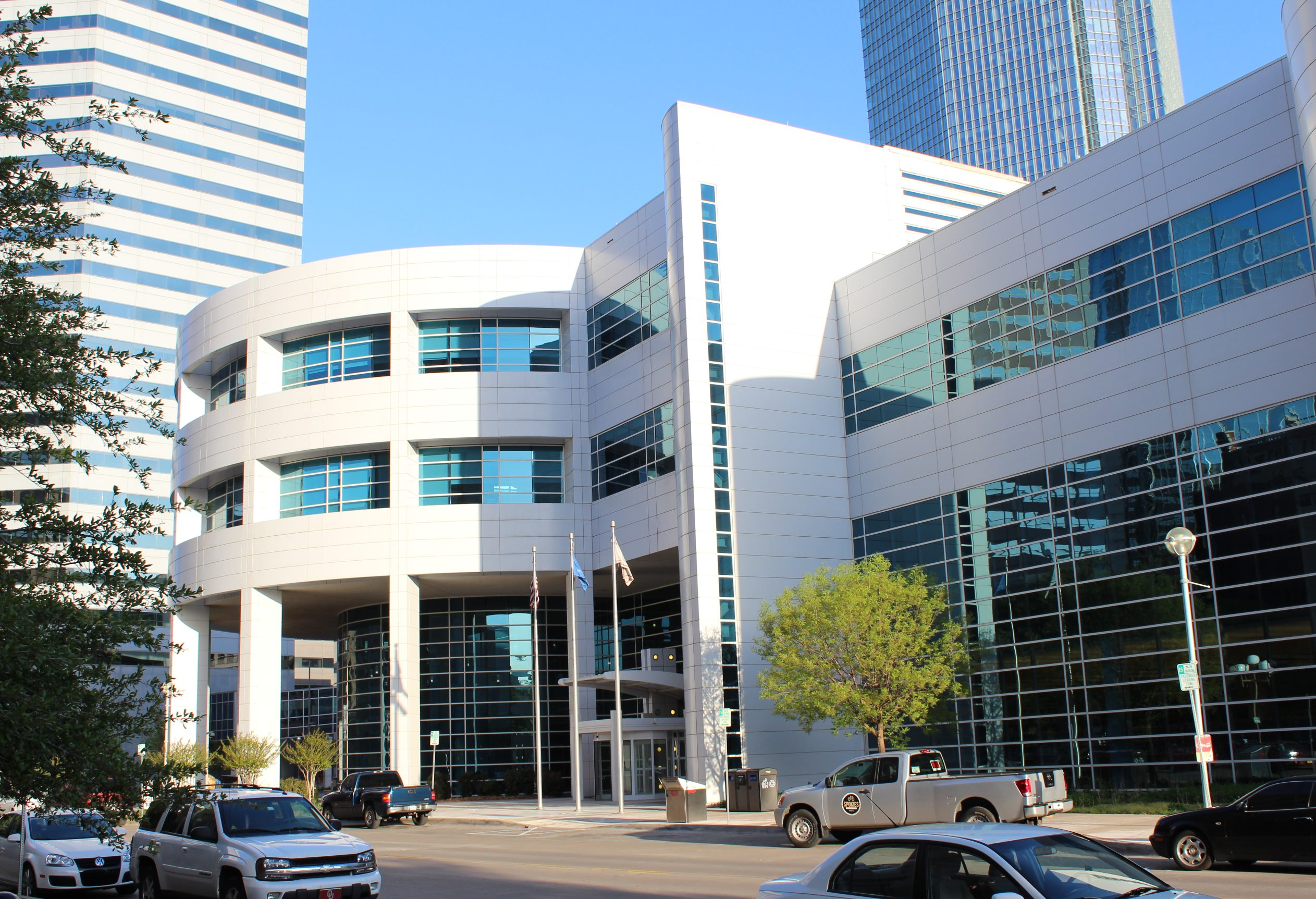
- Ronald J. Norick Downtown Library in Oklahoma City
- Location: Oklahoma County, Oklahoma, United States of America
- Branches: 19 with one under construction

Collection
- Size: Over 1 million

Access and use
- Access requirements: Resident of Oklahoma County, Oklahoma City, or Pioneer Library System cardholders
- Circulation: Over 5.8 million

Other information
- Budget: $62.5 million (2012)
- Director: Jason Kuhl
- Website: http://www.metrolibrary.org

The Metropolitan Library System is a public library system consisting of 19 libraries with one under construction that serves Oklahoma County, Oklahoma. The system serves anyone who lives, attends school, or owns property in Oklahoma County.

Metropolitan's service area includes the majority of the Oklahoma City city limits, as well as many suburbs that surround Oklahoma City that are located in Oklahoma County. In addition to residents of Oklahoma County, the system also allows those served by the Pioneer Library System (which includes Cleveland, McClain, and Pottawatomie counties) to check out materials via a reciprocal borrowing agreement, and also allows non-residents to borrow materials if they pay an annual fee.

The library is governed by the 28-member Metropolitan Library commission: 13 of its members are appointed by the Mayor of Oklahoma City, 11 are appointed by various cities within the Library's service area, and one is appointed by the Board of County Commissioners of Oklahoma County. The other three seats are occupied by the Mayor of Oklahoma City, the chair of the Board of County Commissioners, and the Executive Director of the Metropolitan Library System.

== Circulation ==
The Metropolitan Library System (MLS) had 5.87 million circulations in the 2015-2016 Fiscal Year. The MLS has consistently had about 6 million circulations each year for the past decade. The Edmond branch of the MLS has the highest total circulation of physical materials of all MLS locations.

== Inventory ==
The MLS has 1,343,826 items in its collections. The vast majority circulates. The collection is 76.3% books, 7.5% D.V.D., 6.5% C.D., 6% eMedia, 4% periodicals, 1.6% Audio Players, .2% Video Players, and .2% other materials by items. Information about the collection by titles is needed to gain a real perspective of the collection, but the MLS is clearly a paper-pages-book in hand public library.

You can help add to the collection via suggestions or donations, but either way the materials will have to meet the selection policy.

== Locations ==
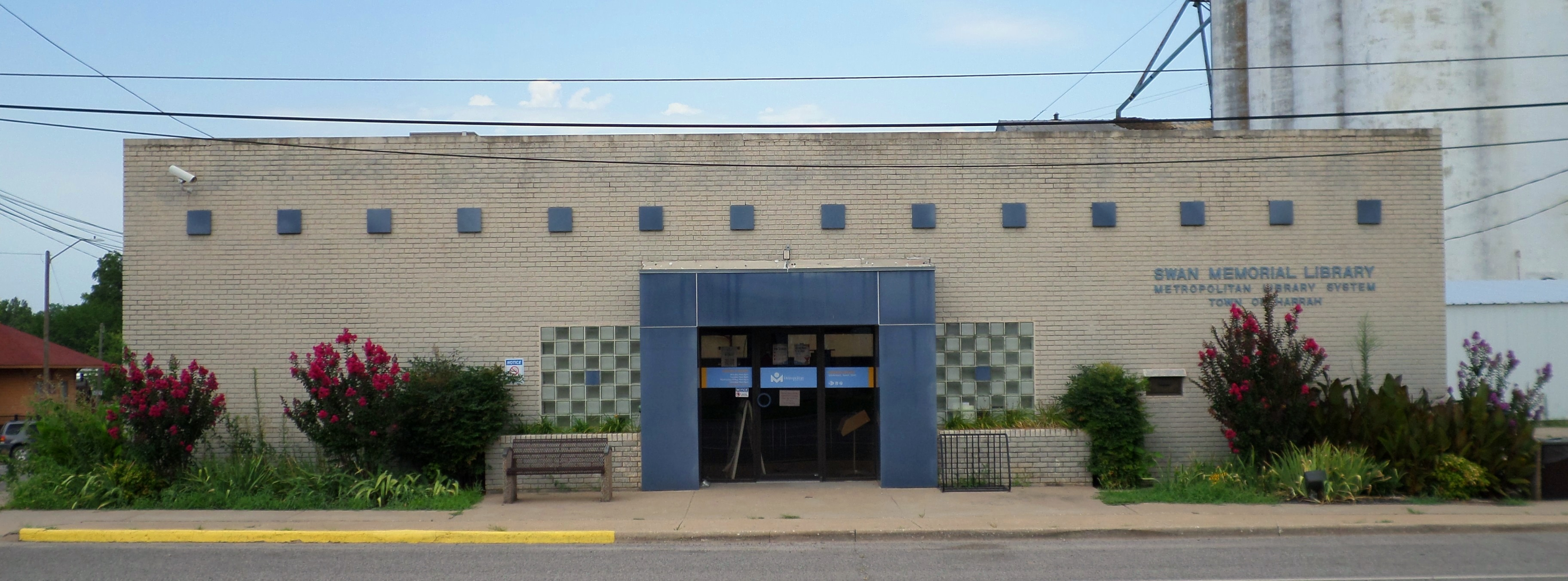
Swan Memorial Library in Harrah

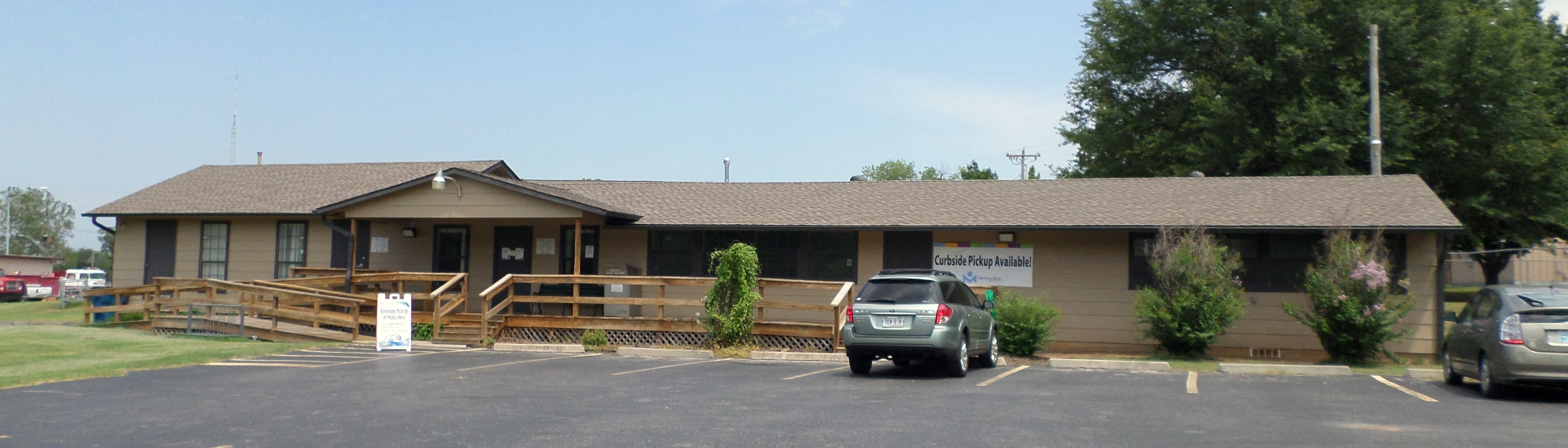
Nicoma Park Library

Metropolitan Library System operates 19 locations with one under construction.

=== Oklahoma City ===
- Almonte Library
- Belle Isle Library
- Capitol Hill Library
- Downtown Library (Ronald J. Norick Downtown Library)
- Northwest Library
- Ralph Ellison Library
- Southern Oaks Library
- Stockyards City (formerly Wright) Library

=== Other cities in Oklahoma County ===
- Bethany Library
- Choctaw Library
- Del City Library
- Edmond Library
- Edmond Library #2 (2026)
- Harrah Library
- Jones Library
- Luther Library
- Midwest City Library
- Nicoma Park Library
- The Village Library
- Warr Acres Library

== Membership ==
There are multiple types of library cards with borrowing privileges. Each card comes with responsibilities.

== Services ==
The Metropolitan Library System provides many services.

Borrowing physical and digital titles via the Public Catalog, Databases, Ask a Librarian, Tailored Titles, Adult Education, GED and Literacy Programs, Books by Mail, Children's Services, Family Place, Come Read with Me, Meeting Rooms & Rental Spaces, Oklahoma Memories, Printing, Public Computers & WiFi, RSS Feeds, Relay Services, Teen & Young Adult Services, and Suggest a Title. Also, the MLS provides an Interlibrary Loan service for items that aren't in the MLS's collection.

Some services are available for all members, while some services are limited depending upon library card type.

== Controversies ==
The Metropolitan Library System has been involved in a number of controversies and accusations of censorship. Many express concern that extreme cultural conservatives exercise an inordinate amount of power over the system.

=== "The Tin Drum" controversy ===
In 1997, the system was placed in the center of a dispute regarding the film "The Tin Drum". The conservative group "Oklahomans for Children and Families" checked out the film, as well as other material from the Library, and began accusing the library of being a harbor for "obscene" material, including the film in question. Members of the group began attending meetings of city councils around Oklahoma County, and were able to convince a number of these cities to pass resolutions regarding the group's goals.

Eventually one of the group's leaders turned over a copy of the film to local police. This resulted in the film being declared obscene by Oklahoma County District Judge Richard Freeman; as a result, all known copies of the film were seized from both libraries as well as individuals who had rented copies from video stores. However, the film's prohibited status was eventually revoked after the film's ban provoked further controversy and allegations of censorship.

=== "Controversial" Children's Books ===
In August 2005, the Library Commission voted 10-7 to move "easy, easy-reader, and tween" books containing "sensitive or controversial" themes to an area that could only be accessed by adults. The decision was based primarily on concern by cultural conservatives that books that advocate acceptance of homosexuality, such as "King and King", were accessible by children. Staff of the Library system opposed such restrictions, and the American Library Association strongly condemned the decision. Prior, state representative Sally Kern had spearheaded an effort to keep such books away from children; in May 2005, the Oklahoma House passed a nonbinding resolution to "confine homosexually themed books and other age-inappropriate material to areas exclusively for adult access and distribution", primarily due to Kern's efforts.

The Commission's decision was implemented in February 2006 as a "Family Talk" section that contained such controversial content. Further restrictions were added in November 2008, when the Commission added the requirement that such material must be placed at least 60 inches off the ground in order to be out of the reach of many children.

In December 2008, bloggers James Miko and Wayne Fuller accused Oklahoma City Mayor Mick Cornett of working with Steve Kern, the husband of Rep. Sally Kern and pastor of Olivet Baptist Church in Oklahoma City, to make nominations to the Metropolitan Library Commission based on the issue of disallowing children access to such controversial books. The "Gossip Boy" blog had obtained a copy of a leaked conversation with Kern, where he mentioned his nominees for the Commission and mentioned that one "won’t take a lick of nonsense from the homos."

=== Attempted gag order on abortion information ===
In July 2022, the library system ordered its workers not to provide information about abortion to guests, saying in a memo, "If a staff member gives any information on how to obtain an abortion, then that person may be found personally liable and will also make MLS liable." One librarian described the order as "dystopian" and noted that the order violated the American Library Association's Principles of Intellectual Freedom. After public backlash, the library system hastily clarified that librarians could "provide factual information" but "should not offer opinions surrounding the law."
