= Chickasha High School =

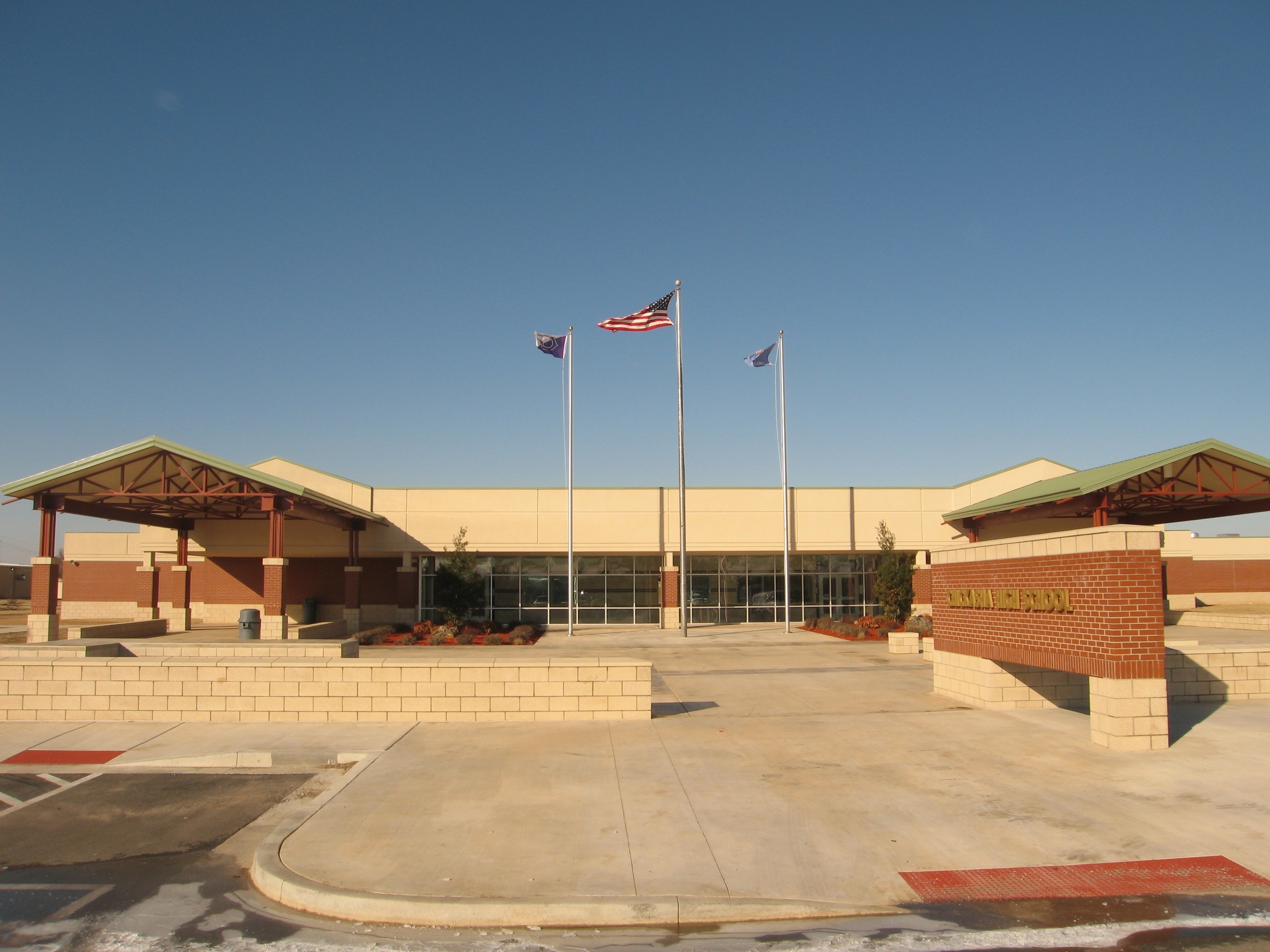
- High School after remodel: Main entrance

Location
- 101 John P Cowen; Chickasha, Oklahoma 73018; United States; 35.0515°N 97.9577°W

Information
- Motto: The mission of Chickasha High School is to improve academic achievement and student success.
- Established: 1898
- School district: Chickasha Public Schools
- Superintendent: Rick Croslin
- Principal: Rhonda Snow
- Teaching staff: 47.38 (on an FTE basis)
- Grades: 9-12
- Enrollment: 753 (2023-2024)
- Student to teacher ratio: 15.89
- Colors: Purple and gold
- Nickname: Fightin' Chicks
- Feeder schools: Chickasha Middle School
- Website: chs.cpsk12.net

Chickasha High School is located in Chickasha, Oklahoma, United States. It is a part of the Chickasha Public Schools school district. For the 2021-2022 school year, the school had an enrollment of 680 with 48 teachers.

The majority of Chickasha is in the Chickasha school district, of which this is the sole comprehensive high school.

== History ==
Chickasha Public Schools were established in the 1890s. In his book, Chickasha...A Journey Back in Time, Irvin Munn quotes Mrs. Joe Dews as reporting that school in Chickasha was held in a store on Main Street with Eugene Hamilton, a lawyer, as teacher. Munn later says the first graduating class was in 1903. It consisted of two members, Lousie Murphy and W. P. Latting. Mr. W. A. Delzell was the first superintendent of schools in Chickasha, and after the town was classified as a First Class City in 1901, four brick school buildings were built. The high school building was completed in 1909.

Lincoln School was established in 1941, consolidating with Chickasha High School in 1959. Lincoln School remained an elementary school with grades 1-9 until 1965. St. Joseph's Academy, associated with the Catholic Church, closed in 1967. With that closure, Chickasha High School became the only public or private high school in the city limits. In her book, Trails, Rails, and School Tales, author Gwen Jackson quotes two sources that Chickasha was "one of the leading school systems in Oklahoma."

Chickasha High School has primarily occupied two locations: 1000 South 9th Street where the current Middle School is located and, in 1968, the current site of Chickasha High School was established, 101 N. John P. Cowan Ave formerly known as Borden Park. Grades 9 through 12 are currently housed at this location. After several unsuccessful attempts to pass bond issues, in 2003, the Chickasha High School Activity Center was completed. It houses the Basketball Arena which contains the Harly Day Basketball Court and the Chickasha High School Auditorium. In 2007, the High School itself was renovated to its current structure. The Stage Building was converted to a Freshman Center.

In 2013, Advanced-Ed, formerly known as North Central Accreditation, awarded Chickasha High School with 100 years of continuous accreditation.

== Programs ==
As well as the traditional curriculum options, Chickasha High School has an associated alternative education program, Quality Academy, which was housed off campus at the former Southwest Elementary School. It is currently on the main campus. CHS also has an educational farm.

== Awards and recognition ==
- Named by U.S. News & World Report as one of “America’s Best High Schools” in 2005, 2006, 2008
- 2010 Bronze medal school named by U.S. News & World Report
- 2012 Governor of Oklahoma ACE Award.

== Notable alumni ==
- Chet Allen (actor) graduated in 1945
- Stephen Alexander (NFL) graduated in 1994
- Ada Lois Sipuel Fisher (Civil Rights Activist) graduated in 1941 from Lincoln High School which consolidated with CHS in 1959
- Laud Humphreys, sociologist
- Scott Meachum (State Treasurer) graduated in 1981
- A. Lee Mullican (artist) graduated in 1932
- Wallis Ohl (Bishop, Episcopal church) graduated in 1961
- Sam Rayburn (NFL) graduated in 1999
- Willie Roberts (CFL) graduated in 1949
- Jami Smith (religious singer and songwriter) graduated in 1988
- Bill Wallace (Author of children’s books) graduated in 1965
- Susan Winchester (Speaker Pro Tempore of Oklahoma State House) graduated in 1968

== State titles ==
18 total

- Baseball 1966, 2002
- Boys Basketball 1953, 1955, 1963
- Girls Basketball 1984
- Cheerleading 2006
- Boys Golf 1972, 1991
- Boys Soccer 1995, 1996, 1999, 2002
- Girls Soccer 1998
- Boys Tennis 1959
- Archery 2015
- Softball 2014, 2015
