= Core Laboratories =

American service Provider

Core Laboratories N.V.
- Type: Public
- Traded as: NYSE: CLB
- ISIN: NL0000200384
- Industry: Petroleum
- Founded: 1998
- Headquarters: Houston, Texas, United States
- Area served: Worldwide
- Products: Reservoir Description; Reservoir Management; Production Enhancement
- Revenue: ▲US$ 700 Mln (2018)
- Number of employees: 4,700 (as of 2018)
- Website: corelab.com

Core Laboratories Inc ("Core Lab") is an American service provider of core and fluid analysis in the petroleum industry. Established in 1936, Core Lab is a global provider of proprietary and patented reservoir description and production enhancement services and products for the oil and gas industry.

== Background ==
The company’s specialties include basic rock properties, special core analysis, and PVT characterization of reservoir fluids. The company is a publicly traded company on NYSE under the symbol "CLB" and was founded in 1936. It is classified in the GCIS Sub-Industry: Oil & Gas Equipment & Services.
