= University of Texas tower shooting =

1966 mass shooting in Texas, U.S.

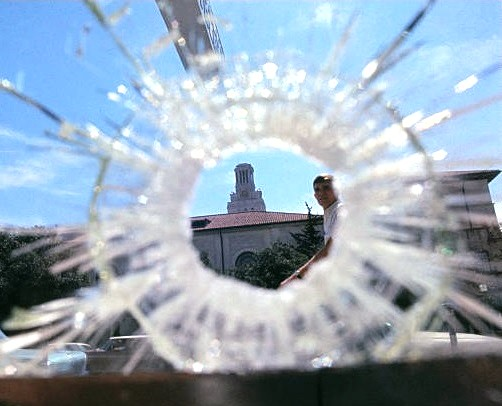
- The Main Building of the University of Texas, seen through a store window shattered by a bullet fired from the observation deck.
- Location: 30.2862°N 97.7394°W; University of Texas at Austin; Austin, Texas, U.S.
- Date: August 1, 1966; 60 years ago Stabbings: c. 12:30 a.m. and 3:00 a.m. Shootings: 11:48 a.m. – 1:24 p.m. (UTC−06:00)
- Target: Perpetrator's mother and wife, random individuals, first responders
- Attack type: Matricide; uxoricide; mass shooting; mass murder; school shooting; shootout; pedicide; feticide
- Weapons: Remington 700 ADL (6 mm); Universal M1 carbine; Remington Model 141 (.35-caliber); Sawn-off Sears Model 60 semi-automatic shotgun (12 gauge); S&W Model 19 (.357 Magnum); Luger P08 (9 mm); Galesi-Brescia pistol (.25 ACP); Bayonet; Machete (unused); Hatchet (unused); Three knives (unused)
- Deaths: 18 (including the perpetrator) (Note: The number of fatalities also includes the perpetrator's mother and wife, an unborn child, and a man who died in 2001 from injuries sustained in the shooting.)
- Injuries: 31
- Perpetrator: Charles Whitman
- Defenders: Austin Police Department, University Police, armed civilians
- Motive: Suicidal ideation; psychological distress; rage; revenge; possible mental illness caused by brain tumor

The University of Texas tower shooting was a mass shooting that occurred on August 1, 1966, at the University of Texas at Austin. The perpetrator, 25-year-old Marine veteran Charles Whitman, indiscriminately fired at members of the public, both within the Main Building tower and from the tower's observation deck. Whitman shot and killed 15 people, including an unborn child, and injured 31 others before he was killed by two Austin Police Department officers approximately 96 minutes after first opening fire from the observation deck.

Prior to arriving at the University of Texas, Whitman had stabbed his mother and wife to death—in part to spare both women "the embarrassment" he believed his actions would cause them. Although Whitman's autopsy revealed a pecan-sized tumor in the white matter above his amygdala, the tumor was not connected to any sensory nerves. Nonetheless, some experts believe this tumor may have contributed to the violent impulses which Whitman had been exhibiting for several years prior to the massacre.

At the time, the University of Texas tower shooting was the deadliest mass shooting by a lone gunman in U.S. history, being surpassed 18 years later by the San Ysidro McDonald's massacre.

== Perpetrator ==
Charles Joseph Whitman (June 24, 1941 – August 1, 1966) was born and raised in Lake Worth, Florida, the eldest of three sons born to Margaret Elizabeth (née Hodges) and Charles Adolphus Whitman Jr. He was raised in a middle class household, although his parents' marriage was marred by domestic violence; Whitman's father was an authoritarian known to be physically and emotionally abusive towards his wife and children.

Whitman was an intelligent child with a reported IQ of 139. A boy scout, he achieved the rank of Eagle Scout three months after his twelfth birthday, reportedly the youngest individual in America to achieve this rank at the time. He graduated from St. Ann's High School in West Palm Beach in June 1959. One month later, he enlisted in the United States Marine Corps and was deployed to Guantánamo Bay, Cuba. While stationed at Guantánamo Bay, Whitman earned a Sharpshooter's Badge and the Marine Corps Expeditionary Medal.

Via a scholarship approved and funded by the Naval Enlisted Science Education Program, Whitman enrolled upon a mechanical engineering scholarship at the University of Texas at Austin in September 1961. The following year, he married his fiancée, Kathleen Frances Leissner—whom he had met at the university—in Needville, Texas.

In 1963, Whitman's scholarship was revoked, and he was ordered to return to active duty at Camp Lejeune in North Carolina, to serve the remainder of his five-year enlistment. He achieved the rank of Lance Corporal while stationed at Camp Lejeune and was honorably discharged from the Marine Corps in December 1964. He returned to Austin and later enrolled in an architectural engineering program at the University of Texas.

In March 1966, Whitman's parents divorced; his mother relocated to Texas. Thereafter, his father telephoned his son on an almost daily basis, pleading with and haranguing him to persuade his mother to return to Florida and reconcile their marriage. Two weeks later, Whitman sought professional help from a campus psychiatrist named Maurice Heatly. He would attend one two-hour session with Heatly before abandoning the sessions.

== Murders ==
It is unknown precisely when Whitman decided to end his life, or when he selected the Main Building of the University of Texas as the location for his act of mass murder. The contents of one of Whitman's suicide notes revealed that in the months prior to his death, he had become "a victim of many unusual and irrational thoughts" and that since talking with Dr. Heatly, he had been "fighting [his] mental turmoil alone". He is known to have twice visited the observation deck of the UT Tower in the ten days prior to August 1, 1966. On the first occasion, on July 22, he had been in the company of his brother John and a friend; on the second occasion six days later, he had been alone.

=== Margaret and Kathleen Whitman ===
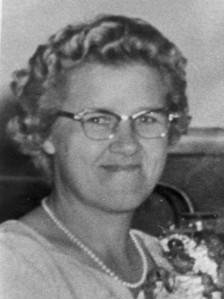
Margaret Elizabeth Whitman

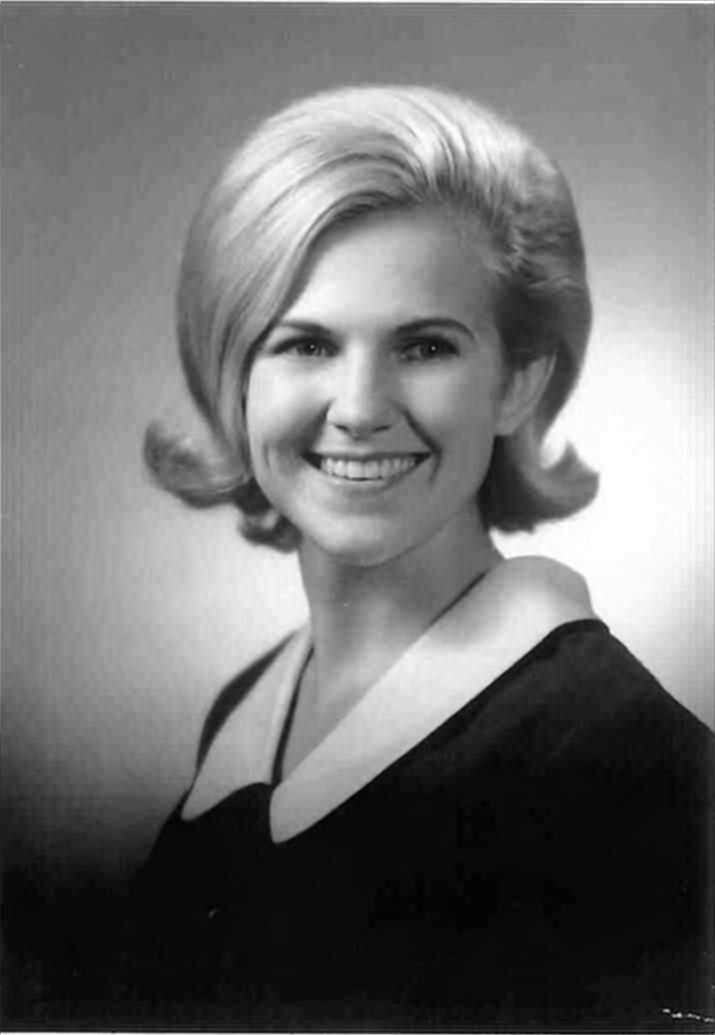
Kathleen Frances Whitman

At 6:45 p.m. on July 31, 1966, Whitman sat at his typewriter and began composing the first of his two suicide notes, in which he outlined his intentions to murder his wife and mother prior to committing his act of mass murder at the University of Texas. Midway through composing this note, he was interrupted by two friends named Larry and Elaine Fuess. Both later remarked Whitman seemed "particularly relieved about something—you know, as if he's solved a problem" and that on two occasions throughout the evening, Whitman remarked: "It's a shame that [Kathleen] should have to work all day and then come home to..." In both instances, Whitman neither finished his sentence nor elaborated further. The trio conversed for a few hours before the Fuesses left so that Whitman could drive his wife home from her part-time job as a switchboard operator. Kathleen Whitman is believed to have immediately retired to bed.

Shortly after midnight (at approximately 12:30 a.m.), Whitman drove to his mother's Guadalupe Street apartment and stabbed her to death with a bayonet before placing her body upon her bed and covering her with sheets. He then grabbed a yellow legal pad and penned the second of his two suicide notes, which he left beside her bed. (Note: Two young men named Steven Foster and Scott Smith would later inform police they had walked past Whitman's mother's apartment door at the estimated time of her murder; both stated they heard whimpering and sobbing sounds from her apartment which they initially believed to source from a child. These weeping sounds are believed to have been from Whitman himself, immediately after he had murdered his mother.) He then returned home and, at approximately 3:00 a.m., repeatedly stabbed his wife through the heart as she lay asleep in their bed before—in largely illegible handwriting—finishing composing his first suicide note. In both suicide notes, he professed his love for both his wife and mother, saying he had killed them to spare them humiliation and—in his mother's case—to alleviate her suffering. He also outlined the "intense hatred" he felt for his father because of the physical and emotional abuse his father had inflicted upon his mother throughout their marriage, describing this hatred as "beyond description". (Note: In the two suicide notes, Whitman outlined his reasons for murdering his mother by stating: "I don't think the poor woman has ever enjoyed life as she is entitled to. She is a simple woman who married a very possessive and dominating man ... The intense hatred I feel for my father is beyond description. My mother gave that man the 25 best years of her life, and because she finally took enough of his beatings, humiliation, degradation, and tribulations that I am sure no one but she and he will ever know—to leave him.")

=== Final preparations ===
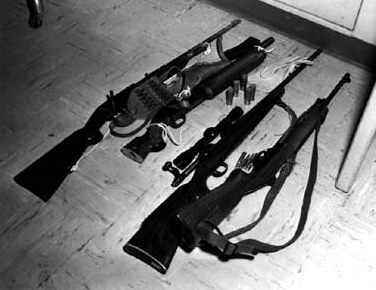
The rifles and sawed-off shotgun used by Whitman in the University of Texas tower shooting

Later that morning, Whitman phoned his wife's boss to explain she was ill and unable to attend work that day; he then rented a dolly before driving to his bank, where he cashed $250 worth of bad checks (equivalent to $2,500 in 2025) — one drawn from his own account, and another from his mother's. At 9 a.m. he drove to a hardware store, where he purchased a .30 caliber Universal M1 carbine, two additional ammunition magazines, and eight boxes of ammunition, telling the cashier he planned to travel to Florida to hunt wild hogs. Thirty minutes later he purchased four more carbine magazines, six additional boxes of ammunition, and a can of gun cleaning solvent from Chuck's Gun Shop before purchasing a 12 gauge semi-automatic shotgun from a nearby Sears. Whitman then returned home, where he sawed off the butt and barrel of the shotgun in his garage. All these purchases were then placed into Whitman's footlocker, which he had retained from his service within the Marine Corps.

Whitman also packed into his footlocker a Remington Model 700 6-mm bolt-action hunting rifle equipped with a Leupold M8-4X scope, a .35-caliber Remington pump action rifle, a 9-mm Luger pistol, a Galesi-Brescia .25-caliber pistol, a Smith & Wesson M19 .357 Magnum revolver, and more than 700 rounds of ammunition. He also packed assorted cans of food in addition to a flask of coffee, vitamins, Dexedrine, Excedrin, earplugs, three-and-a-half gallons of water, matches, lighter fluid, rope, binoculars, a machete, a hatchet, three knives, a small Channel Master transistor radio, toilet paper, a razor, and a bottle of Mennen deodorant.

Shortly before driving to the University of Texas, Whitman also donned blue nylon khaki coveralls over his shirt and jeans in an effort to appear as a janitor, repairman, or deliveryman and thus deflect any suspicion upon his arrival at the university.

=== Arrival at University of Texas ===
At approximately 11:25 a.m., Whitman reached the University of Texas at Austin, where he displayed false research assistant identification to a guard in order to obtain a 40-minute parking permit with the explanation he was delivering teaching equipment to a professor. Whitman then wheeled his equipment toward the Main Building of the university. He is believed to have entered the Tower between 11:30 and 11:35 a.m. and may have timed his entrance to the tower to coincide with the 11:45 a.m. student class changeover in order to maximize the number of available targets walking around the campus.

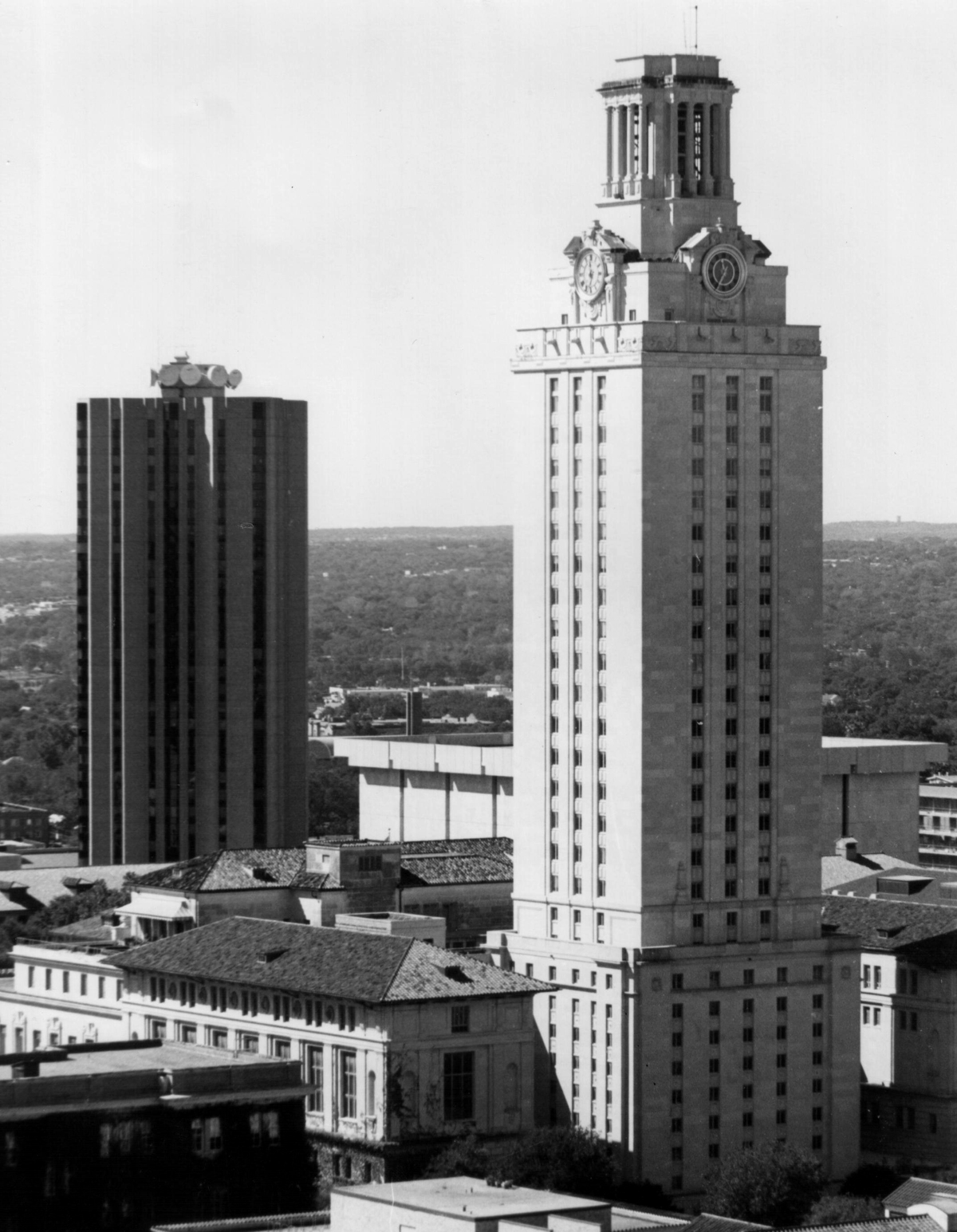
Main Building of the University of Texas

Upon entering the Main Building, Whitman found the elevator did not work. An employee named Vera Palmer—believing Whitman was a repairman—informed him the elevator had been "turned off" before reaching for a switch to activate it for him; Whitman smiled as he thanked Palmer, stating, "Thank you ma'am", before repeatedly saying: "You don't know how happy that makes me... how happy that makes me." He exited the elevator on the 27th floor, then hauled the dolly and equipment up a final flight of stairs to a hallway, then down a corridor toward the observation deck.

=== UT Tower homicides ===
Inside the reception area, Whitman encountered 51-year-old receptionist Edna Townsley; he bludgeoned Townsley into unconsciousness with his rifle butt—splitting her skull—before dragging her body behind a couch. As Whitman hid Townsley's body, he was surprised by a young Texan couple named Donald Walden and Cheryl Botts, who entered the room from the observation deck as he leaned over the couch. Botts later stated she and Walden believed Whitman, dressed in coveralls and holding a firearm in each hand, was about to shoot pigeons from the tower; she smiled and greeted Whitman, who smiled back and said, "Hi, how are you?" Both observed a dark stain on the carpet close to where Townsley had been seated, which Botts assumed was varnish.

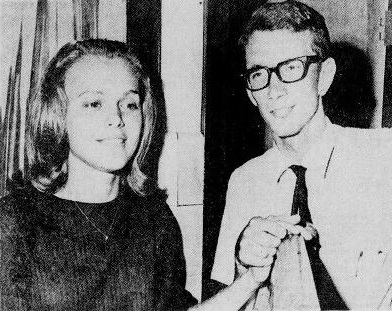
Cheryl Botts and Donald Walden

Moments after Walden and Botts exited the 28th floor, Whitman constructed a makeshift barricade to the floor entrance using Townsley's desk, two chairs, and a wastebasket. As he was about to enter the observation deck, he was surprised by a vacationing Texarkana family attempting to navigate the barricade. As 16-year-old Mark Gabour attempted to prise the entrance to the staircase open, Whitman wheeled and fired at the family with his shotgun, killing Mark and his 56-year-old aunt, Marguerite Lamport, and seriously wounding 19-year-old Michael Gabour and his 41-year-old mother, Mary, before resealing his makeshift barricade. Michael Joseph Gabour Sr. (48) and William Lamport (who had been following their family members to the reception area) were uninjured; both briefly ran from the stairwell before attempting to provide care for their family members, then running for help. Gabour would later recall encountering Vera Palmer exiting an elevator on the 27th floor to relieve Edna Townsley's receptionist position; he frantically cautioned the young woman as to the ongoing homicidal commotion. Palmer immediately returned to the ground floor.

After again securing the makeshift barricade, Whitman fatally shot Townsley once in the head before wheeling his footlocker to the six-foot-wide observation deck, (Note: The observation deck of the Main Building of the University of Texas is surrounded by a limestone parapet four feet (1.2 m) high and eighteen inches thick.) where he wedged the dolly against the sole entrance door before—at approximately 11:46 a.m.—donning a white headband and unpacking his weapons from the footlocker, which he placed around all four sides of the deck.

=== Observation deck shootings ===
At 11:48 a.m. Whitman began shooting from the observation deck 231 feet (70 m) above the ground. His targets were random individuals around the campus, although the majority were young students, including an 18-year-old woman who was eight months pregnant and whose unborn child was fatally shot—the first individual Whitman shot from the observation deck. Several of those killed or injured were shot on or near a section of Guadalupe Street known as the Drag, which is home to coffee shops, bookstores, and other locations popular with students and is located to the west of the Main Building; numerous others were shot from the other three sides of the observation deck. In the first 20 minutes after Whitman first fired from the tower, he shot the majority of his victims.

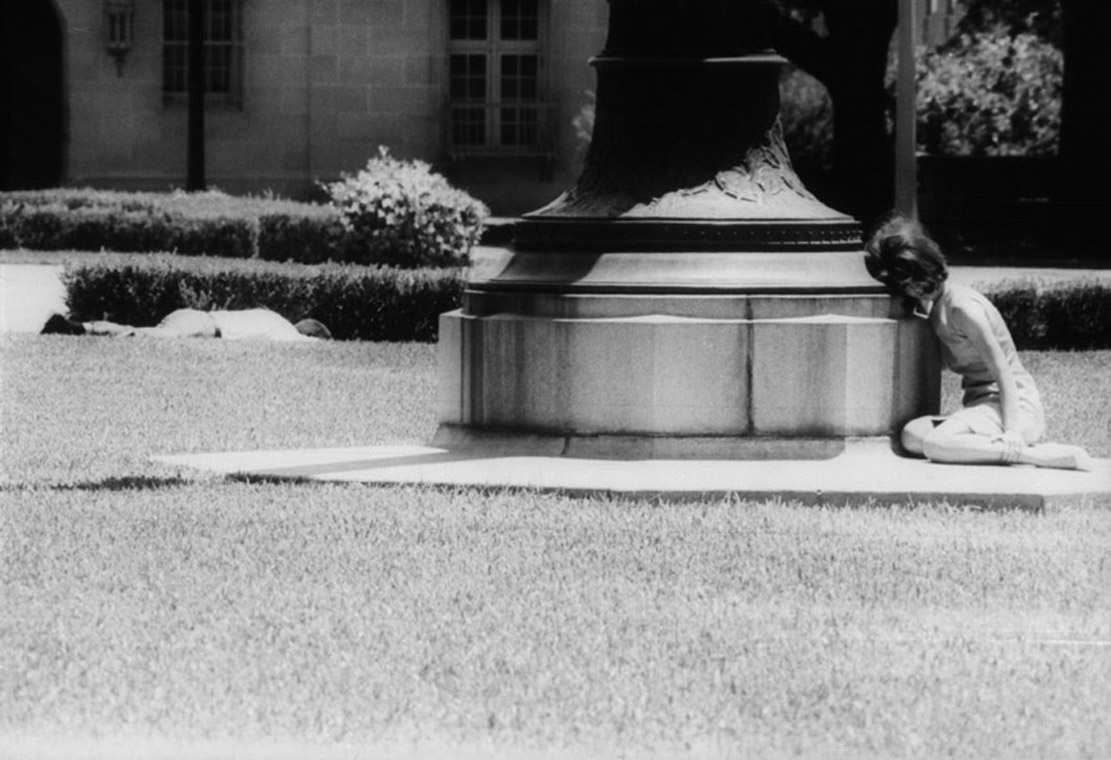
Charlotte Darehshori takes refuge behind a flagpole as an injured student, Devereaux Huffman, lies beside a hedge

Initially, several individuals upon and close to the campus mistook the sound of gunfire for noise sourcing from a nearby construction site and thought that the persons falling to the ground were participating in either a distasteful joke or a symbolic protest against the Vietnam War. One student within the tower at the time of the shootings, 23-year-old Norma Barger, later recollected looking from her fourth floor window and observing six individuals sprawled close to the tower. Initially, Barger "expected the six to get up and walk away laughing" before she noticed the blood by their bodies and saw another individual fall to the ground. One woman who was shot in the stomach close to the Main Building recalled that as she pleaded with a passing bystander for help, he tersely replied: "Get up! What do you think you're doing?" However, as the reality of the unfolding events dawned upon the public, those present on the ground took refuge behind any available form of cover. Nonetheless, several people also risked their lives to rescue those wounded as Whitman remained upon the observation deck. Ambulances from local funeral homes and an armored car were also used to reach the casualties as local news reporters broadcast updates of the ongoing situation, warning the public to avoid traveling close to or venturing onto the university campus.

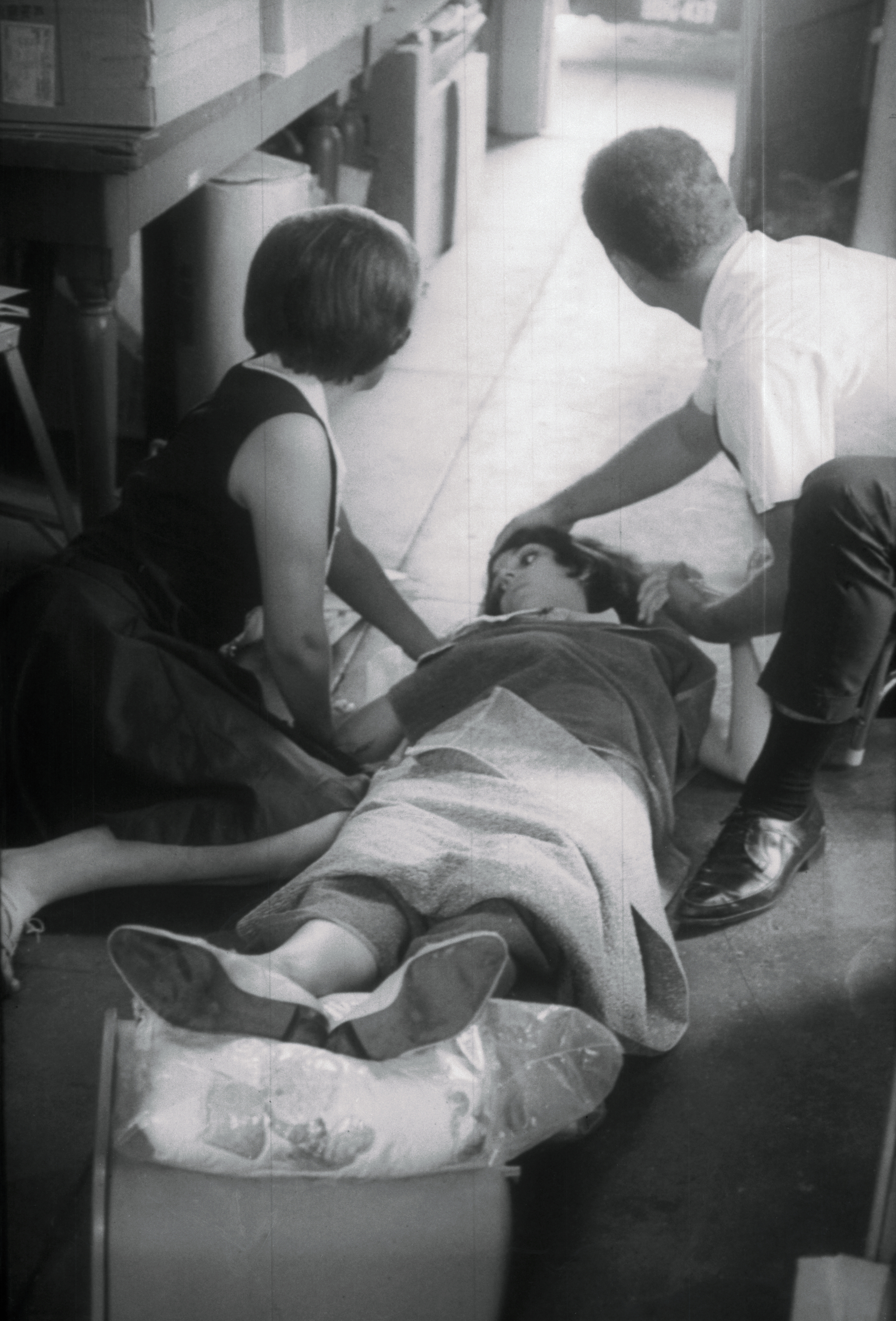
Two students comfort a young woman shot on Guadalupe Street

As the shootings continued, several police officers and civilians provided suppressive fire from the ground with firearms of varying calibers including pistols, shotguns, and hunting rifles, forcing Whitman to remain low and predominantly fire through the three large storm drains located at the foot of each of the four feet high observation deck walls, where he continued to find targets, including a 29-year-old electrical repairman, Roy Dell Schmidt, who was fatally shot 500 yards (1,500 ft; 460 m) from the tower seconds after remarking to a policeman his belief he was out of the sniper's range, and 30-year-old funeral home director Morris Wayne Hohmann, who was shot and seriously wounded seconds after entering Whitman's view from behind the cover of the ambulance in which he had been transporting wounded people to local hospitals.

Police chartered a two-seater Champion Citabria light aircraft, from which sharpshooter Marion Lee attempted to obtain a clear shot of Whitman as the aircraft orbited close to the tower; however, rising heat waves created turbulence, limiting the stability of the aircraft and thus Lee's ability to focus. Whitman fired two shots into the aircraft before pilot Jim Boutwell navigated to a safe distance, from which he continued to circle, seeking to distract Whitman and further limit his ability to fire from the tower.

== Police response ==
=== Police dispatch ===
Four minutes after Whitman first opened fire from the tower, the Austin Police Department received their first reports of an active shooting incident at the University of Texas. All available police officers and highway patrolmen in the vicinity of the university were immediately dispatched to the site. One of the first officers to arrive, 23-year-old Austin patrolman Billy Paul Speed, took refuge behind a columned stone wall. Whitman shot through a six-inch (15 cm) space between the columns of the wall and killed Speed with a single shot to the upper chest.

Civilian Allen Crum (40), a retired United States Air Force tail gunner, became aware of the shootings when he noticed teenager Aleck Hernandez lying close to the University Book Store Co-Op he managed and surrounded by several individuals. Initially, Crum believed a fight was in progress, but quickly realized the teenager had been shot in the upper leg and that the assailant was continuing to fire from the UT Tower. Unable to make his way back to his store safely after assisting in providing first aid to Hernandez, Crum proceeded to the tower, where he offered to help the police. Inside the Main Building, he was provided with a rifle by Department of Public Safety Agent William Cowan. Crum then accompanied Cowan and Austin Police Officer Jerry Day up the elevator to the 27th floor.

Officer Ramiro Martinez was off duty at home when he heard news reports of the ongoing shooting at midday. Having called the police station to offer assistance, Martinez was instructed to go to the campus to assist in redirecting traffic; upon arrival, he found other officers already performing these duties, and thus ran toward the tower where, having ascended the elevator to the 27th floor, he encountered officers Day and Cowan, and Allen Crum.

Austin police officer Houston Roy McCoy (26) also proceeded to the Main Building; he was able to safely cross the campus as he encountered a university employee familiar with the underground tunnels of the campus; as such, he and a small number of other officers were able to safely reach the Main Building. Upon the 28th floor, McCoy encountered Crum, Day, and Martinez.

=== Ascent to observation deck ===
On the 27th floor, the quartet of Day, Crum, Cowan and Martinez—plus two other officers named Jack Rodman and Leslie Gebert (who had separately ascended to this floor)—encountered a distraught Michael Gabour Sr., who hysterically shouted that his entire family had been murdered inside the tower by the gunman as he clutched his wife's bloodstained shoes. Gabour attempted to wrestle a rifle from one of the officers; Day and Cowan restrained the distraught man as Rodman and Gebert returned to the ground floor via the elevator, where they instructed Vera Palmer to switch off all elevators within the building before they began securing all perimeter entrances to the edifice as Martinez and Crum ascended the stairs to the 28th floor. (Day followed Crum and Martinez to the 28th floor shortly thereafter; Cowan established a police communications post.)

As Martinez and Crum ascended the stairs to the observation deck, Crum asked, "Are we playing for keeps?", to which Martinez responded, "You're damn right we are." In response, Crum replied, "Well, you better deputize me." Martinez replied, "Consider yourself deputized."

Midway upon the stairwell leading to the reception area, Martinez and Crum found the bodies of Marguerite Lamport and Mark Gabour and the severely injured Mary Gabour and her older son, Michael. Michael Gabour—slumped against a wall at the base of the stairway—had initially been knocked unconscious and had only recently awakened. He informed Martinez and Crum there was only one gunman before gesturing toward the observation deck and stating, "He's outside." After positioning Mary Gabour on her side to prevent her from drowning in her own blood, the two men continued ascending to the reception area, where they discovered the mortally wounded Edna Townsley.

== End of incident ==
Artist's impression of the observation deck, illustrating the position of Whitman and the movements of those who ended the incident

At approximately 1:21 p.m. Martinez and Crum reached the door to the observation deck. Martinez first dislodged the dolly Whitman had wedged against the entrance door before instructing Crum to remain positioned outside the door with his firearm focused to provide cover from their right, and to shoot anyone who appeared in his sights from this southwesterly direction. Martinez then proceeded warily to the left. McCoy and Day separately reached the observation deck shortly thereafter: McCoy immediately followed Martinez to Crum's left; Day—arriving at the observation deck shortly after McCoy—proceeded to Crum's right, with Crum providing cover.

Seconds after Day began proceeding toward the southwestern corner of the observation deck, Crum—having heard the sniper's footsteps proceeding toward the corner of the observation deck he covered—fired a single shot from his rifle into the southwest corner of the parapet, directing Whitman away from his line of fire and toward the northwestern corner of the observation deck.

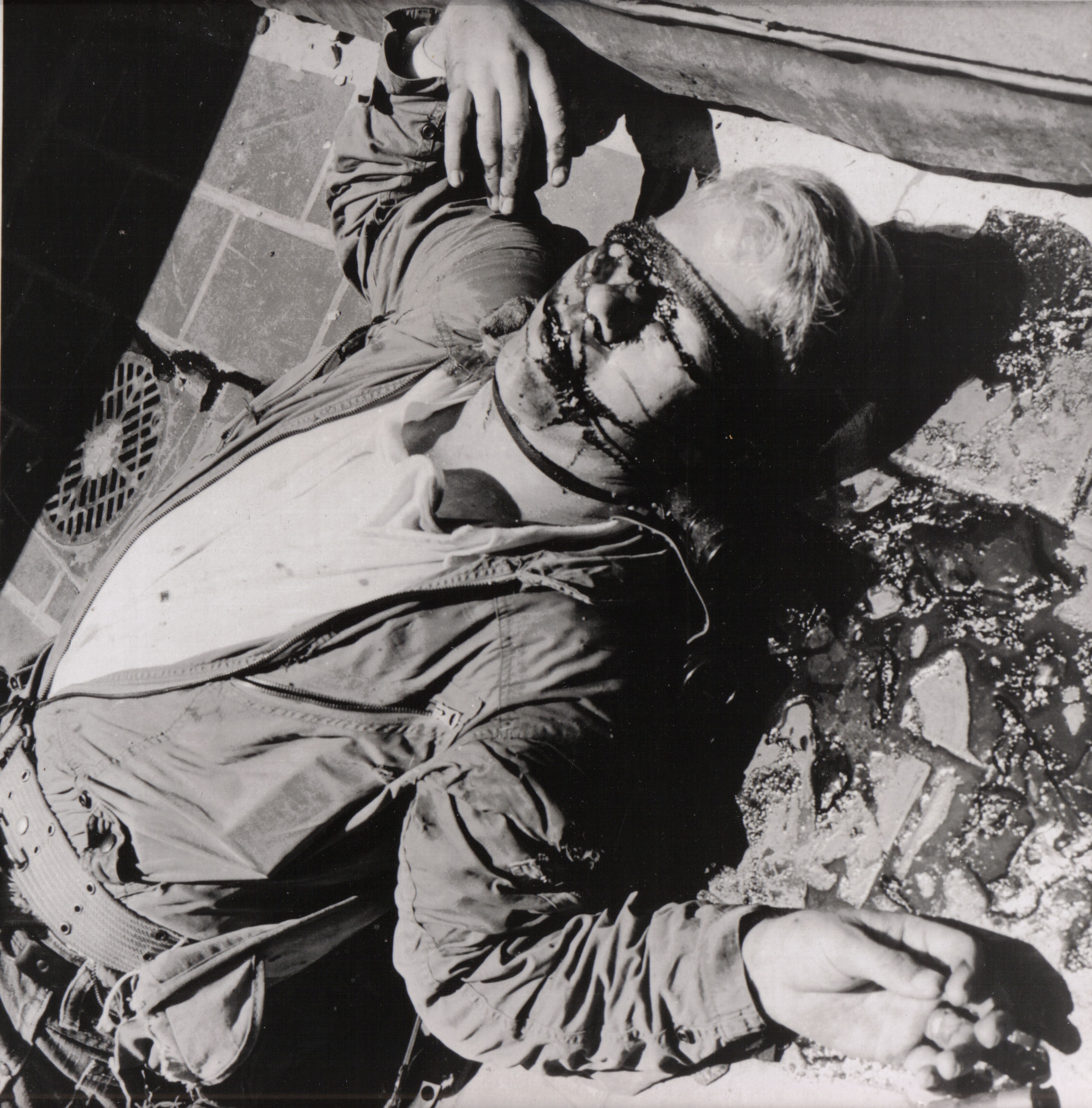
The body of Charles Whitman lies on the observation deck

As Whitman crouched close to the northwestern wall of the observation deck with his firearm focused in the direction of the source of Crum's rifle shot, Martinez and McCoy rounded the northeastern corner. Martinez emerged from cover and immediately fired in Whitman's direction, missing with most or all of his six revolver shots. (Note: Whitman's autopsy report reveals he had been killed by shotgun pellets to the brain and heart. By Martinez's own admission, the sole occasion he shot Whitman with McCoy's shotgun was a single shot to the left arm after Whitman had fallen. However, the autopsy report indicates some wounds to Whitman's left arm were inflicted by a firearm of a caliber more consistent with Martinez's revolver than McCoy's shotgun.) Almost simultaneously, McCoy leaped from cover as Martinez rapidly fired in Whitman's general direction; he recollected observing Whitman's head looking over the light ballast. McCoy fired at Whitman's white headband, hitting him between the eyes with several pellets and killing him almost instantly. McCoy then fired his shotgun a second time, hitting Whitman on his left side. Whitman fell to the ground; Martinez then grabbed McCoy's shotgun, ran to Whitman's prone body, and fired a direct shotgun blast into Whitman's left arm at close range. The time of Whitman's death was 1:24 p.m.—approximately 96 minutes after he had first opened fire from the observation deck.

As civilians and police were initially unaware the sniper had been killed, those upon the ground continued firing at the tower, narrowly missing Martinez. McCoy instructed another officer to notify a police dispatcher to announce to Austin's news media outlets that the sniper had been killed. As these instructions were relayed, Allen Crum waved a white handkerchief from above the parapet to signal the sniper's siege from the tower was over.

Several of the immediate media broadcasts and publications erroneously referred to Crum as the sniper waving a white flag in a public gesture of surrender.

=== Public convergence ===
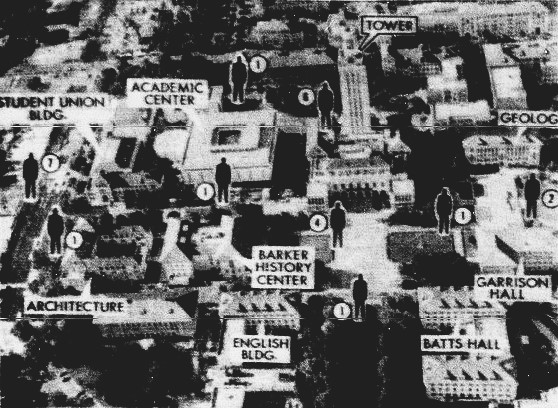
Contemporary aerial illustration of the University of Texas at Austin, depicting the locations of several individuals shot from the Main Building

In the minutes immediately following the media announcement of the sniper's death, several hundred students, staff, and citizens within the vicinity of the Main Building emerged from cover and silently converged upon and around the campus. According to one survivor, few "said anything" as all present were in a state of disbelief and stunned silence. KTBC reporter Neal Spelce later stated those converging upon campus "looked like they were mesmerized ... they, they weren't looking at each other; they weren't talking to each other ... most of them were just kind of walking around as if dazed and wondering what in the world has happened ... to my world."

=== Perpetrator's identification ===
An examination of Whitman's personal possessions revealed several identification cards. By 3 p.m., his identity had been formally established and his name broadcast nationwide. Whitman's father—upon hearing news reports of his son's identification—contacted the Austin police and provided both his son's address and that of his former wife. Shortly thereafter, police discovered the bodies of both women and the suicide notes Whitman had left close to their bodies.

At Whitman's home, investigators also discovered a note he had placed alongside two cameras and his wife's wedding ring upon a dresser beside their bed. The note simply read: "Have the film developed in these cameras. Thank you." Also discovered was a collection of written admonitions he had apparently read on a daily basis stored inside an envelope. On the outside of the envelope, Whitman had penned a final message: "8-1-66. I never could quite make it. These thoughts are too much for me."

Whitman's body underwent an autopsy at the Cook Funeral Home in Austin on the morning of August 2, 1966. His autopsy revealed a small, "fairly well outlined tumor [approximately] 2 x 1.5 x 1 cm in dimensions" in the white matter above his amygdala. Experts disagree upon whether this tumor contributed to the homicidal and suicidal mindset exhibited by Whitman prior to his death. His body was interred alongside that of his mother at Hillcrest Memorial Park in West Palm Beach, Florida on August 5.

== Victims ==
Charles Whitman killed seventeen people and wounded at least thirty-one others over the course of thirteen hours before he was killed on the observation deck of the UT Tower on August 1, 1966. All but two of those killed and all injured sustained their wounds after Whitman reached the 28th floor of the Main Building less than two hours before his own death. The fatalities include an unborn baby boy, a 17-year-old girl who succumbed to her injuries one week after the shooting, and a man shot at age 23 who succumbed to his injuries thirty-five years after the event, and whose death was officially ruled a homicide.

Beyond those killed and injured within the Main Building and the first two people shot from the observation deck of the tower, the precise order of Whitman's firing cannot be ascertained.

=== Killed ===
==== Prior to UT Tower shootings ====
- Margaret Elizabeth Whitman (43). Perpetrator's mother. Stabbed to death in her Guadalupe Street apartment.
- Kathleen Frances Whitman (23). Perpetrator's wife. Stabbed to death in the couple's Jewell Street apartment.

==== UT Tower shootings ====
- Edna Elizabeth Townsley (51). Receptionist. Bludgeoned into unconsciousness with the butt of Whitman's rifle, then shot in the head. Townsley died of her injuries two hours after Whitman's death.
- Mark Jerome Gabour (16). Tourist. Shot in the head by Whitman as he attempted to navigate the makeshift barricade Whitman had constructed to the 28th floor.
- Marguerite M. Lamport (56). Tourist. Shot by Whitman as she ascended the stairwell to the 28th floor. She was pronounced dead on arrival at Brackenridge Hospital.
- Baby Boy Wilson. Unborn child of 18-year-old Claire Wilson—the first person shot from the UT Tower. (Note: In 2014, Claire Wilson's stillborn son received a tombstone in Austin Memorial Park Cemetery, after his grave was rediscovered by author Gary Lavergne. Adorned with a single crucifix, the headstone reads: "Baby Boy Wilson / August 1, 1966".)

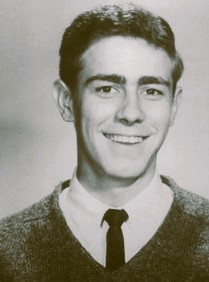
Thomas Frederick Eckman

- Thomas Frederick Eckman (18). Freshman student and fiancé of Claire Wilson. Eckman was shot through the chest seconds after Wilson was hit. He died almost immediately.
- Dr. Robert Hamilton Boyer (33). Mathematician (see Boyer–Lindquist coordinates). Boyer may have been the third person shot from the tower; he was struck in the lower back. He was days away from relocating to England, where he had secured a teaching post at the University of Liverpool.
- Karen Joan Griffith (17). A Lanier High School student and one of Kathleen Whitman's biology class students. Griffith received a shot in the shoulder and chest which pierced her right lung; she died seven days later.
- Thomas Ray Karr (24). Senior student. Karr was shot in the spine as he walked to his apartment following a Spanish exam, reportedly as he attempted to assist Griffith. He died in a hospital emergency room at 1:10 p.m.
- David Hubert Gunby (23). Engineering student. Gunby was shot in the upper left arm, the bullet entering his abdomen and severing his small intestine at approximately 11:55 a.m. During surgery, it was discovered that Gunby had only one functioning kidney, which had now been severely damaged; he was in great pain for the rest of his life. In November 2001, he died at age 58 one week after discontinuing dialysis resulting from his health having deteriorated to the degree of his becoming largely bedridden via kidney disease. His death was officially ruled a homicide.
- Thomas Aquinas Ashton (22). Student and Peace Corps volunteer. Ashton was killed while walking to meet three fellow Peace Corps volunteers at the Student Union. He was shot once in the chest.

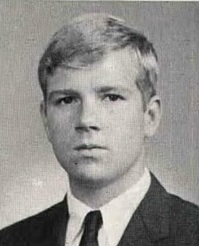
Paul Bolton Sonntag

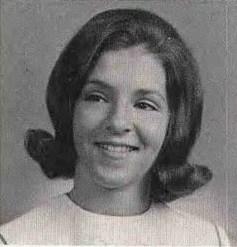
Claudia Marie Rutt

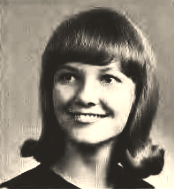
Carla Sue Wheeler

- Paul Bolton Sonntag (18). High school graduate. Sonntag and his girlfriend, Claudia Rutt, took refuge behind a construction barricade on Guadalupe Street upon hearing gunfire from the UT Tower. When Sonntag abruptly stood, Whitman shot him in the mouth, killing him instantly. Sonntag's grandfather, KTBC news director Paul Bolton, learned of his namesake grandson's death as the victims' names were recited on air that day.
- Claudia Marilyn Rutt (18). High school graduate and ballet dancer. Rutt was shot in the chest seconds after seeing her boyfriend shot through the mouth and attempting to go to his aid; she died several hours later. Rutt's friend, Carla Sue Wheeler, was shot in the left hand as she attempted to prevent her from emerging from cover to assist Sonntag.
- Harry Walchuk (38). Walchuk was a PhD student and father of six children. He was shot once in the chest on Guadalupe Street while leaving a magazine store.
- Officer Billy Paul Speed (23). Austin Police officer. Patrolman Speed was shot through a gap in the masonry between decorative balusters on the South Mall at 12:08 p.m. He was pronounced dead on arrival at Brackenridge Hospital.
- Roy Dell Schmidt (29). Electrician. Schmidt had taken cover with several other people behind his vehicle some 500 yards (460 m) from the tower. Approximately 30 minutes after Whitman had begun shooting, Schmidt stood in the belief he was out of range and was almost immediately shot in the abdomen. He was the fatality farthest from the tower.

=== Wounded ===
- Mary Frances Gabour (41). Tourist. Shot in the head and spine within the UT Tower. Her injuries left her crippled and declared legally blind.
- Michael Gabour Jr. (19). Tourist. Shot within the UT Tower. Gabour's injuries left him unable to complete his US Air Force Academy training.
- Claire Wilson (18). Student. Wilson—eight months pregnant—was shot once through the stomach while leaving the Student Union. Her unborn son was killed. (Note: Wilson remained hospitalized for three months and was unable to conceive any further children.)
- Devereaux Maitland Huffman (31). PhD student. Shot in the arm and chest close to the Main Building. He fell to the ground, feigning death. Secretary Charlotte Darehshori came under fire as she ran to help Huffman and Robert Boyer; she took refuge behind a concrete flagpole for an hour and a half until the shooting ended.
- Aleck Acevedo Hernandez (17). High school student. Hernandez was shot through the right femur while delivering newspapers on his bicycle close to the West Mall entrance. He was shot and injured seconds before Whitman shot and killed Karen Griffith.
- Nancy Harvey (21). Student. Harvey—visibly pregnant—was shot alongside her friend Ellen Evganides while leaving the tower for lunch. Harvey was shot in the hip approximately 100 yards (91 m) from the tower. (Note: Harvey's unborn child was uninjured in her shooting.)
- Ellen Evganides (26). UT employee. Evganides was struck in the left leg and thigh by the ricochet of the shot which struck Harvey.
- Carla Sue Wheeler (18). Student. Shot through the hand as she attempted to restrain her friend Claudia Rutt from emerging from cover to assist Paul Sonntag.
- Irma Garcia (21). Student. Shot in the left shoulder, the bullet exiting close to the center of her back, as she walked close to the Hogg Memorial Auditorium.
- Oscar Royvela (21). Student. Royvela was shot in the chest and arm close to the Hogg Memorial Auditorium as he attempted to assist Garcia.
- Robert Lee Heard (36). Associated Press reporter. Shot in the upper left arm.
- Janet Paulos (20). Student. Shot once through the chest on Guadalupe and 24th St. as she and her fiancé, Abdul Khashab, walked to lunch.
- Abdul Khashab (26). Chemistry student from Mosul, Iraq. Shot through the elbow.
- Sandra Wilson (21). Student. Wilson was shot through the arm, the bullet entering her lung and grazing her spinal cord, on Guadalupe Street just moments after Paulos and Khashab were shot.
- Lana Kay Phillips (21). Retail employee. Phillips received a shoulder wound while standing outside a clothing store on Guadalupe Street.
- Billy Snowden (35). Basketball coach. Snowden, believing himself out of range, was struck in the shoulder while standing in a barbershop doorway. He was the person shot farthest from the tower who survived his injuries.
- David Mattson (22). Peace Corps volunteer and Persian language student. Shot in the wrist as he held his arm aloft to face level to study his watch. He would later state "part of [his] wrist" had been destroyed by the impact.
- Roland Cap Ehlke (21). Peace Corps volunteer and Persian language student. Struck in both arms by shrapnel, and then in the leg by a bullet when he left cover to bring Mattson to safety.
- Homer Jackson Kelley (64). Shopkeeper. Kelley was shot in the leg while helping Mattson, Ehlke, and 21-year-old Tom Herman into his shop.
- John Scott Allen (18). Student. Shot in the right forearm as he looked toward the Main Building from behind a window in the Student Union building.
- Brenda Gail Littlefield (18). UT employee. A newlywed, Littlefield was shot in the hip while exiting the UT Tower.
- Adrian L. Littlefield (19). Husband of Brenda Littlefield. He was shot in the back as he attempted to assist his injured wife.
- Morris Wayne Hohmann (30). Funeral director. Shot in the right thigh at the corner of 23rd and Guadalupe as he attempted to recover wounded individuals.
- Avelino Esparza (26). Carpenter. Shot in the upper left arm, the bullet shattering his humerus and rendering his hand unusable, as he walked to his job site at 11:50 a.m.
- Delores Ortega (30). Student. Ortega suffered a deep cut on the back of her head, most likely caused by flying glass.
- Della Martinez. Visitor from Monterrey, Mexico. Wounded by shell fragments.
- Marina Martinez. Visitor from Monterrey, Mexico. Wounded by shell fragments.
- Robert Frede (19). Student. Wounded in crossfire between Whitman and those shooting from the ground.
- Fred L. Foster. Foster received minor injuries to his left hand in the crossfire between Whitman and those shooting from the ground.
- Miguel Solis (25). Solis received treatment for unspecified injuries sustained in the commotion, but was released from hospital within 24 hours.
- C. A. Stewart. Stewart was not shot, but was injured in the commotion.

== Aftermath ==
=== University of Texas ===
The University of Texas remained closed for one day following the University of Texas tower shootings before reopening on August 3. All flags across the university campus were flown at half-staff for over a week.

The tower observation deck remained closed to the public until 1968. Following the suicides of four students who each jumped to their death from the observation deck between 1968 and 1974, a decision was made to permanently close the observation deck to the public. The observation deck itself was reopened to public access in 1999, but only via appointment-guided tours. All visitors are screened by metal detectors before they are permitted to enter the premises.

As a result of the public outcry following the shooting, progress toward the formation of a cohesive campus police at the University of Texas began in earnest. In 1967, Texas state senator Alexander Aikin Jr. introduced Senate Bill 162, an "act providing for the protection, safety and welfare of students and employees ... and for the policing of the buildings and grounds of the State institutions of higher education of this State." Governor John Connally formally signed the legislation into law on April 27, 1967. The first class of commissioned officers of the University of Texas System Police Academy graduated the following year. Current commissioned police officers at the University of Texas undergo a variety of training programs designed to help them prepare to combat all threats on campus if the Austin Police Department or SWAT team responders are unavailable.

=== Police officers ===
Both Ramiro Martinez and Houston McCoy were awarded Medals of Valor by the city of Austin for their roles in ending the University of Texas tower shooting. Martinez has since granted several interviews in which he has discussed his role in ending the University of Texas tower shooting and in which he generally portrays himself as the predominant force in "scoring" with his firearm shots upon Whitman and thus neutralizing the public threat, whereas McCoy, who died in December 2012, resisted drawing public attention to himself regarding his own role in ending the massacre.

In an interview granted to the Austin American-Statesman the year prior to his death, McCoy expressed no wish for the mention of Whitman be included in his obituary, stating: "I do not want what I did that day to define me ... but I guess you have to do that, mention the incident. Just be sure to say that I was not the only police officer there that day; it was teamwork."

McCoy had previously stated in 2008: "You're a policeman; you're required to enforce all federal and state laws and city ordinances and keep the peace, and that was our sworn oath."

Allen Crum relocated to Las Vegas, Nevada, in 1972. He never returned to Texas and died of natural causes in March 2001 at age 75.

=== Memorials ===
Kathleen Whitman was laid to rest within Davis-Greenlawn Cemetery in Rosenberg, Texas on August 3, 1966. Her father, Raymond Leissner, refused to harbor any hatred toward his son-in-law, who had murdered his only daughter, choosing to believe the tumor discovered upon Whitman's autopsy was the cause of his homicidal and suicidal ideations.

On the twentieth anniversary of the University of Texas tower shooting, Whitman's father consented to a press reporter's request for an interview regarding his son's mass murder spree. One question asked in this interview was whether Whitman's ultimate motive for the murders had been to punish his father for the abusive and authoritarian methods in which he had raised his children in addition to the physical and emotional abuse he had inflicted upon Whitman's mother. In response, Whitman Sr. replied: "Yes: He's not punishing me [like] you'd say with a stick or anything like that; he's punishing me in the fact that I had to let the world know that if I did wrong, I'm sorry for it ... Yes, it hurt deeply. It always has and there will always be a hurt there, but I don't feel in any way that I was responsible for any of it."

In 2006, a memorial garden was formally dedicated to those who died or were otherwise affected by the University of Texas tower shooting. This garden is located north of the university's landmark tower, with the design structure located around the middle of the three ponds located within this garden. Initial plans were to symbolically erect a visitor's walk around the pond: one side displaying imagery and plaques representing loss, violence, and chaos; the other side a more cathartic and healing semblance via reflection, hope, and solace. Although these initial plans were never fully implemented, by 2014, plans for a larger granite memorial and the installation of a bench around this memorial pond had been approved.

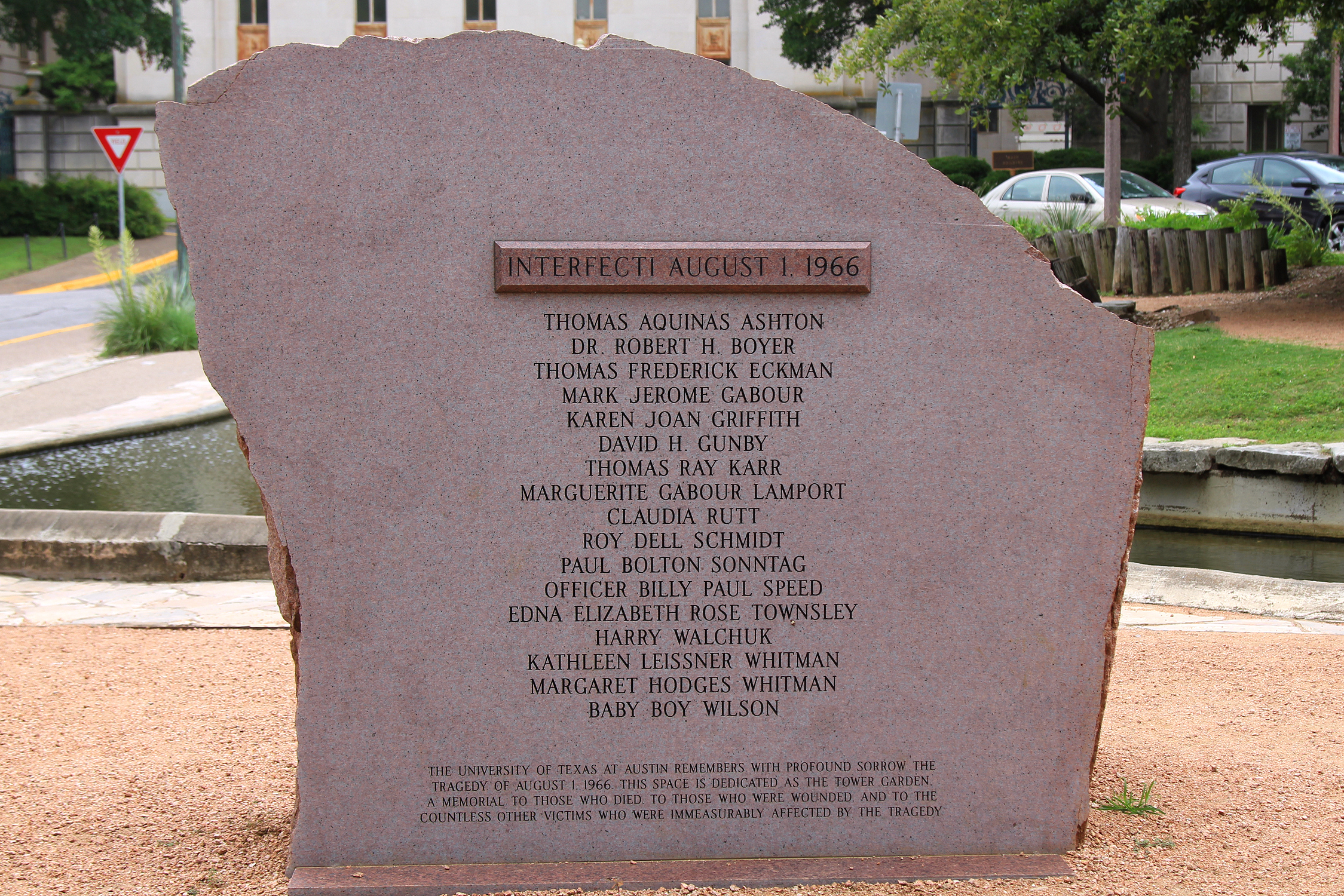
The stone monument unveiled at the Tower Garden on the fiftieth anniversary of the University of Texas tower shooting

At 11:48 a.m. on the fiftieth anniversary of the shootings in 2016, the University of Texas observed two minutes of silence prior to the unveiling of a stone monument engraved with the names of the fatalities at the Tower Garden. This polished memorial stone was unveiled directly behind a previously installed rectangular memorial structure and is engraved with the names of all the fatalities of August 1, 1966, symbolically inscribed to face away from the observation deck, and beneath an inscription reading Interfecti August 1, 1966. This ceremony was attended by several hundred individuals, including several survivors and first responders.

The clock upon the UT Tower was also stopped at 11:48 a.m. on the fiftieth anniversary of the shootings and remained motionless for 24 hours.

=== Distinguished service awards ===
In 2008, the Austin City Council presented Distinguished Service Awards to individuals (some deceased) who selflessly assisted in ending the University of Texas tower shooting:

Officer Billy Paul Speed: City of Austin police officer. Killed near tower.

Officer Phillip Conner: Former Army medic. Administered first aid to casualties and provided cover as other officers entered Main Building.

Officer Jerry Day: Moved casualty to safety before ascending tower to observation deck.

Officer Ramiro Martinez: Ascended tower to observation deck. First officer to spot and fire at sniper.

Officer Houston McCoy: Ascended tower to observation deck. Fired fatal shots into sniper.

Officer Harold Moe: Instrumental in saving the lives of two critically injured victims. Used portable radio to notify police the siege was over.

Officer George Shepard: Instrumental in saving the lives of two critically injured victims.

Officer Milton Shoquist: Instrumental in saving the lives of two critically injured victims.

Department of Public Safety Agent William A. Cowan Jr.: Ascended tower. Instrumental in implementing communications network and removing people from the 27th floor.

Civilian Jim Boutwell: Volunteered usage of light aircraft to police. Orbited tower in efforts to shoot and subdue sniper.

Lieutenant Marion Lee: Sharpshooter in light aircraft piloted by Boutwell. Orbited tower in efforts to shoot and subdue sniper.

Civilian Allen Crum: Ascended tower to observation deck. Assisted officers Day, Martinez, and McCoy in felling sniper.

Civilian Frank Holder: University employee. Assisted officers in navigating tower to observation deck.

Civilian William Wilcox: University employee. Navigated officers through underground tunnels to safely enter Main Building.

== Media ==
=== Film ===
- The made-for-television action drama The Deadly Tower is directly based upon the University of Texas tower shooting. Directed by Jerry Jameson and featuring Kurt Russell as Whitman, The Deadly Tower was released on October 18, 1975.
- The 2016 documentary film Tower directly focuses on the events of August 1, 1966. Directed and produced by Keith Maitland, this 82-minute documentary features interviews with several individuals upon the campus on the date of the massacre including victims, rescuers, and law enforcement officers.

=== Books ===
- Akers, Monte; Akers, Nathan; Friedman, Dr. Roger (2016). Tower Sniper: The Terror of America’s First Active Shooter on Campus. Houston: John M. Hardy Publishing. ISBN 978-0-990-37143-4.
- Canter, David (2014). Criminal Psychology: Topics in Applied Psychology. Abingdon, Oxfordshire: Taylor & Francis Group. ISBN 978-0-340-92892-9.
- Cawthorne, Nigel; Tibballs, Geoff (1993). Killers: Contract Killers, Spree Killers, Sex Killers. The Ruthless Exponents of Murder. London: Boxtree Publishing. ISBN 0-7522-0850-0.
- Cawthorne, Nigel (2007). Serial Killers and Mass Murderers: Profiles of the World's Most Barbaric Criminals. New York: Ulysses Press. ISBN 978-1-569-75578-5.
- Crutchfield, James A. (2015). It Happened in Texas: Remarkable Events that Shaped History. Helena, Montana: TwoDot Publishing Group. ISBN 978-1-493-01588-7.
- Dockery, Kevin (2007). Stalkers and Shooters: An Oral History of Snipers. London: Penguin Publishing Group. ISBN 978-1-440-62890-0.
- Dougan, Andrew (2004). The Hunting of Man: A History of the Sniper. London: Fourth Estate Publishing. ISBN 978-1-841-15756-6.
- Douglas, John; Burgess, Ann W.; Burgess, Allen G.; Ressler, Robert K. (2011). Crime Classification Manual: A Standard System for Investigating and Classifying Violent Crimes (2nd ed.). New Jersey: John Wiley & Sons, Inc. ISBN 978-1-118-04718-7.
- Foreman, Laura (1993). Mass Murderers. Virginia: Time-Life Books. ISBN 978-0-783-50004-1.
- Franscell, Ron (2011). Delivered from Evil: True Stories of Ordinary People Who Faced Monstrous Mass Killers and Survived. Massachusetts: Fair Winds Press. ISBN 978-1-610-59494-3.
- Green, Ryan (2020). The Texas Tower Sniper: The Terrifying True Story of Charles Whitman. Amazon Digital Services. ISBN 979-8-629-96464-3.
- Hemphill, Bryan O.; LaBanc, Brandi (2010). Enough Is Enough: A Student Affairs Perspective on Preparedness and Response to a Campus Shooting. Sterling, Virginia: Stylus Publishing. ISBN 978-1-579-22442-4.
- Holmes, Ronald M.; Holmes, Stephen T. (2010). Fatal Violence: Case Studies and Analysis of Emerging Forms. Boca Raton, Florida: CRC Press. ISBN 978-1-439-82688-1.
- Innes, Brian (1994). Real-Life Crimes and How They Were Solved: Crime Casebook. Oxford: Chancellor Press. ISBN 978-1-851-52595-9.
- Irwin, Ronald (2016). Mass Murders in America. North Carolina: Lulu. ISBN 978-1-329-82932-9.
- Jeffers, H. Paul (1992). Profiles in Evil: Chilling Case Histories from the Files of the FBI's Violent Crime Unit. London: Warner Publishing. ISBN 978-0-751-50778-2.
- Lane, Brian; Gregg, Wilfred (1994). The Encyclopedia of Mass Murder. London: Headline Book Publishing. ISBN 0-747-20897-2.
- Lavergne, Gary M. (1997). A Sniper in the Tower. Denton, Texas: University of North Texas Press. ISBN 978-1-574-41029-7.
- Lester, David (2004). Mass Murder: The Scourge of the 21st Century. New York: Nova Publishers. ISBN 978-1-590-33929-9.
- Levin, Jack; Fox, James Alan (1985). Mass Murder: America's Growing Menace. New York: Plenum Press. ISBN 978-0-306-41943-0.
- Lindsay, Mark; Lester, David (2019). Suicide by Cop: Committing Suicide by Provoking Police to Shoot You. Amityville, New York: Baywood Publishing Company, Inc. ISBN 978-0-895-03290-4.
- Martinez, Ramiro (2005). They Call Me Ranger Ray: From the UT Tower Sniper to Corruption in South Texas. New Braunfels, Texas: Rio Bravo Publishing. ISBN 978-0-976-01620-5.
- McNab, Chris (2009). Deadly Force: Firearms and American Law Enforcement, from the Wild West to the Streets of Today. Oxford: Osprey Publishing. ISBN 978-1-846-03376-6.
- Mayo, Mike (2008). American Murder: Criminals, Crimes and the Media. Michigan: Visible Ink Press. ISBN 978-1-578-59256-2.
- Nevin, David (1966). "Under the Clock, a Sniper with 31 Minutes to Live". LIFE. No. August 22, 1966. New York City: Time Inc. pp. 10–19. ISSN 0024-3019.
- Pender, Patrick; Smyth, Frank; Granger, Ray (1994). "The Texas Massacre". Real-Life Crimes (62). London, England: Eaglemoss Publications Ltd.: 1366–13729. ISBN 978-1-856-29996-1.
- Perline, Irvin H.; Goldschmidt, Jona (2004). The Psychology and Law of Workplace Violence: A Handbook for Mental Health Professionals and Employers. Illinois: Charles C. Thomas Publishing. ISBN 978-0-398-07432-6.
- Plaza, Valrie (2015). American Mass Murderers. North Carolina: Lulu. ISBN 978-1-312-96140-1.
- Ramsland, Katherine M. (2005). Inside the Minds of Mass Murderers: Why They Kill. Connecticut: Greenwood Publishing Group. ISBN 978-0-275-98475-5.
- Reid, Sue (1988). Crime and Criminology. Indiana: Holt, Rinehart, and Winston. ISBN 978-0-030-12744-1.
- Robinson, Paul H.; Robinson, Sarah M. (2018). Crimes That Changed Our World: Tragedy, Outrage, and Reform. London: Bloomsbury Publishing. ISBN 979-8-216-23664-1.
- Tobias, Ronald (1981). They Shoot to Kill: A Psycho-History of Criminal Sniping. Boulder, Colorado: Paladin Press. ISBN 978-0-87364-207-1.
- Torres, John A. (2016). The People Behind School Shootings and Public Massacres. New York: Enslow Publishing. ISBN 978-0-766-07615-0.
- Walsh, Stephen (2021). Key Cases in Forensic and Criminological Psychology. California: Sage Publications Inc. ISBN 978-1-526-49484-9.
- Williams, Shelton (2007). Summer of '66. Denton, Texas: Zone Press. ISBN 978-0-977-75587-5.
- Young, Scott D. (2024). Cause of Death: Ballistic Trauma Reassessment of the Forensic Evidence from the 1966 University of Texas at Austin Mass Murder Helps Solve the Mystery of Why?. Manitoba, Canada: FriesenPress. ISBN 978-1-739-00180-3.

=== Television ===
- A 90-minute documentary, The Killing of America, features a section devoted to the murders committed by Charles Whitman. Directed by Sheldon Renan, this documentary was released in September 1981.
- The made-for-TV series Great Crimes and Trials of the 20th Century has broadcast an episode focusing on Whitman's murders. Commissioned by the BBC and narrated by Robert Powell, this 25-minute documentary was first broadcast in 1994.
- Sniper '66: A 60-minute documentary written and directed by Whitney Milam. First broadcast in July 2006, Sniper '66 received a Lone Star Emmy Award for Best Historical Documentary in 2007.
- The Discovery Channel has broadcast a 45-minute episode relating to Charles Whitman as part of the true crime series Deranged Killers. This documentary features interviews forensic psychiatrist Katherine Ramsland and author Gary Lavergne.
- The 28th Floor. Commissioned by Investigation Discovery as part of the documentary series A Crime to Remember and narrated by Claire Jamison, this 45-minute documentary was initially broadcast on December 2, 2014.

== See also ==
- Gun violence in the United States
- List of school massacres by death toll
- List of school-related attacks
- List of school shootings in the United States by death toll
- List of school shootings in the United States (before 2000)
- List of rampage killers (school massacres)
- Mass murder – Act of murdering many people in a short span
- Mass shootings in the United States
- Matricide – Act of killing one's own mother
- Spree shooting – Person killing in multiple locations in a short time
- Suicidal ideation – Thoughts, ideas, or ruminations about attempting suicide
- Uxoricide – Act of killing one's wife or girlfriend
