= Robert Heard =

American writer and journalist (1930–2014)

- Born: April 10, 1930; Big Spring, Texas, U.S.
- Died: April 15, 2014 (aged 84)
- Known for: writer, journalist, reporter

Robert Lee Heard (April 10, 1930 – April 15, 2014) was an American writer, journalist and reporter for the Associated Press, who covered politics, government and sports news in Texas for the wire service. Heard was shot and wounded by Charles Whitman on August 1, 1966, while covering Whitman's attack on the University of Texas at Austin for the Associated Press. Heard received widespread praise for his series of reports on the integration of the Texas Longhorns football team. He also authored several books, focusing on sports and politics.

== Early life ==
Robert Heard was born on April 10, 1930, in Big Spring, Texas. His father was a Baptist preacher. He had three older brothers. Heard's parents, who had expected a baby girl, did not know what to name him. They decided to call him Robert Lee after General Robert E. Lee, at the urging of his two older brothers, who had just learned about the Civil War general in elementary school.

== Career ==
Heard served in the United States Marines in the Korean War from 1951 to 1952. He returned to Texas after the war, where he obtained a law degree from Baylor University. He practiced law in Houston for two years before pursuing a career change to journalism. He initially worked as a journalist at the Waco Tribune-Herald in Waco, Texas, and the AP Long Beach, California. Heard was then hired as a reporter by the Associated Press in 1964.

On August 1, 1966, Heard, who was 36 years old at the time, was shot in the arm while covering the mass shooting at the University of Texas at Austin. Heard, who had arrived on scene as a reporter for the Associated Press, was attempting to follow to Texas highway patrol offices across a parking lot when he was wounded by a bullet fired by Charles Whitman. In a 2006 interview with Texas Monthly, Heard recalled, "Just before I reached the curb, I was shot down. I'd forgotten my Marine training; I hadn't zigzagged." He continued to grant interviews on the anniversary of the shooting, but attempted to distance his professional and personal life from the tragedy. According to his wife, Betsy Heard, "He lived his whole life hoping to get that out of the first paragraph of his obituary."

Heard eventually left the Associated Press, but continued to work in journalism and public relations. He worked as a press secretary for Joe Christie, a Democratic U.S. Senator candidate, during his campaign. Heard also wrote for the Texas Lawyer and served as the Texas State Capitol correspondent for the San Antonio Express-News.

Heard founded Inside Texas, a newsletter which covered athletics at the University of Texas. His books included "Dance With Who Brung Us: Quips & Quotes from Darrell Royal," which compiled quotes from Darrell Royal, a former Texas Longhorns football coach. Heard also authored "Miracle of the Killer Bees: 12 Senators Who Changed Texas Politics," which focused on twelve Texas state senators who fled Austin in 1979 and went into hiding to stop a bill.

== Personal life ==
Robert Heard died from complications of hip surgery on April 15, 2014, at the age of 84. He was survived by his wife, Betsy Heard; a son, Tom Heard, from his first marriage to, Mary Lou Custer Heard, (another son, Dan, died in 1993) and brother, Wyatt Heard. A memorial service was planned for his family's June 2014 family reunion in Uvalde County, Texas.
