= Yñiguez =

Yñiguez is a Spanish surname. Notable people with the surname include:

- Nicanor Yñiguez (1915-2007), Filipino politician
- Pepe Yñiguez, Spanish baseball broadcaster
- Richard Yniguez (born 1946), American actor
