= A Sniper in the Tower =

A Sniper in the Tower: the Charles Whitman murders
- Cover of the first edition
- Author: Gary Lavergne
- Language: English
- Subject: Charles Whitman and the University of Texas tower shooting
- Genre: Non-fiction
- Publisher: University of North Texas Press
- Publication date: March 15, 1997
- Publication place: United States
- Pages: 324
- ISBN: 1-574-41029-6

A Sniper in the Tower: the Charles Whitman murders is a 1997 non-fiction book about Charles Whitman and the University of Texas tower shooting written by Gary Lavergne. It was Lavergne's debut book.

The book documents the life of Charles Whitman, a former United States Marine and student at the University of Texas at Austin, who killed 14 people and injured 32 others in a mass shooting from the observation deck of the Main Building tower on the university's campus. Lavergne drew upon original police and court documents, interviews with survivors and witnesses, and Whitman's own writings to chronicle Whitman's life and murders.

== Reception ==
The book was praised for being the first full-length, detailed book on Whitman and the shootings. As written in Publishers Weekly: "[A Sniper in the Tower] is the first book-length study of Whitman, and given the thoroughness of Lavergne's work, it may well remain the only one." Author Gerald Posner praised Lavergne's "meticulous research", stating that the book "come(s) as close as possible to understanding the 'why' of mass murder".

More divisive was Lavergne's analysis of Whitman's motivations, with several reviewers unconvinced by the explanation given in the book. Lewis Gould in The Journal of American History wrote: "Lavergne's assertion that Whitman was not motivated by any of the numerous suspected agents (tumor, drugs, insanity) but that he simply decided to become a murderer is argued unconvincingly. The author's theory of ambiguity is a good one, but neither it nor the other possible motives are explored deeply enough." Lavergne has defended his explanation of Whitman's motives since the book's publication.

== Documentary ==
Author Gary Lavergne was featured on an episode of the documentary series True Crime Authors where he discussed A Sniper in the Tower.
