= The Deadly Tower =

1975 television film by Jerry Jameson

- Official DVD cover
- Genre: Docudrama; Action; Thriller
- Written by: William Douglas Lansford
- Directed by: Jerry Jameson
- Starring: Kurt Russell; Richard Yniguez; Ned Beatty; Pernell Roberts; Clifton James; John Forsythe
- Narrated by: Gilbert Roland
- Music by: Don Ellis
- Country of origin: United States
- Original language: English

Production
- Executive producer: Richard Caffey
- Producer: Antonio Calderón
- Production locations: Austin, Texas; Baton Rouge, Louisiana
- Cinematography: Matthew F. Leonetti
- Editor: Tom Stevens
- Running time: 95 minutes
- Production company: MGM Television

Original release
- Network: NBC
- Release: October 18, 1975

The Deadly Tower (also known as Sniper) is a 1975 American made-for-television action drama thriller film directed by Jerry Jameson. It stars Kurt Russell and Richard Yniguez and is based on the University of Texas tower shooting.

== Plot ==
The film is based on the true story of Charles Joseph Whitman, an engineering student and former Marine who murdered his wife and mother and then killed 14 more people and wounded 31 others in a shooting rampage at the University of Texas at Austin on the afternoon of August 1, 1966.

== Cast ==
- Kurt Russell as Charles Whitman
- Richard Yniguez as Ramiro Martinez
- Ned Beatty as Allen Crum
- Pernell Roberts as Lieutenant Lee
- Clifton James as Captain Fred Ambrose
- John Forsythe as Lt. Elwood Forbes
- Gilbert Roland as Narrator (voice)
- Paul Carr as C.T. Foss
- Alan Vint as Tim Davis
- Maria-Elena Cordero as Vinni Martinez
- Pepe Serna as Mano
- Roger Manning as Officer Kibb

== Production ==
The film was produced by Antonino Calderon, who was head of Image, an organization dedicated to providing more positive screen depictions of Mexican Americans. He met with Robert Howard, president of the NBC network and asked if he could make a film about an actual Chicano hero. Howard agreed. Calderon pitched several stories and Howard agreed to finance The Deadly Tower as it was about a Chicano police officer Ramiro Martinez. MGM was commissioned to make the movie with Calderon as producer, Richard Caffey as executive producer and David Goldsmith as production executive.

The Deadly Tower was filmed between the 16 June through 4 July 1975, at the Louisiana State Capitol in Baton Rouge, Louisiana because the University of Texas refused to allow filming there.

== Release ==
=== Lawsuits ===
In 1976, Martinez received an undisclosed out-of-court settlement after suing the producers of The Deadly Tower for negative and racist depictions of his wife, portrayed in the movie as a nagging Hispanic woman Vinni (Maria-Elena Cordero); in fact, she is a blonde and blue-eyed German.

In 1990, Houston McCoy, one of two policemen who took part in killing Whitman, sued Turner Broadcasting System (which held the ownership of most of MGM's pre-1986 works) for $14 million for emotional distress and damage to his reputation, claiming the film caused him to become an alcoholic and lose self-respect by depicting him as a coward.

== Reception ==
=== Critical response ===
The Los Angeles Times called the film "highly effective" but wondered "no matter how well done is there any reason to relive that bloody moment of history."
