= 1984 Dallas nightclub shooting =

Mass shooting in Dallas, Texas

- Location: 32.9234°N 96.8387°W; Ianni's Restaurant and Club, Dallas, Texas, United States
- Date: June 29, 1984; 12:15 a.m. (UTC-5)
- Attack type: Mass shooting
- Weapon: Smith & Wesson 459
- Deaths: 6
- Injuries: 1
- Perpetrator: Abdelkrim Belachheb
- Convictions: 6 counts of murder, 1 count of attempted murder

On June 29, 1984, a mass shooting occurred at a bar in Dallas, Texas, United States. Abdelkrim Belachheb, a 39-year-old Moroccan national and resident alien, opened fire in Ianni's Restaurant and Club, killing six and severely injuring one.

As under Texas law multiple murder by itself was not one of the aggravating factors required to make murder a capital crime, Belachheb could not be sentenced to death. The shooting resulted in a change in Texas law making multiple murder itself a capital crime, and Belachheb was instead sentenced to life in prison. The shooting also resulted in criticism of American immigration policy, as Belachheb was able to get a visa despite being a fugitive in both Belgium and Morocco. Shortly after the 30th anniversary of the shooting, The Dallas Morning News described it as "Dallas’ worst mass murder".

== Shooting ==
Fifteen minutes after midnight on June 29, 1984, Abdelkrim Belachheb opened fire in the Ianni's Restaurant and Club bar in Dallas, Texas. Belachheb was having an argument with a woman, before she shoved him away on the dance floor and called him a "monkey". Belachheb blew her a kiss and left the bar, returning with a Smith & Wesson 459 from his car. He told the woman "I've had enough with you", shot the woman point blank, and then walked down the row of bar stools, shooting four others. Belachheb exited the bar, but then returned and shot and killed another man. Belachheb then fled the bar, shooting a seventh man as he escaped.

Belachheb was described as being calm during the shooting. After fleeing the club, he drove his car into a telephone pole, which the police traced to him. Belachheb was arrested at a friend's house, 3 miles (5 km) from the crash site, less than 2 hours later.

Five victims died at the scene, while the woman who had argued with Belachheb died en route to Parkland Memorial Hospital. One victim was left in serious condition, but survived. Three of the six killed were shot execution-style, with the gun held to their heads. They were four women and two men, aged 32 to 49.

== Perpetrator ==
Abdelkrim Belachheb was born November 24, 1944, in N'Zalat Bni Amar, French Morocco, the fourth child of eleven children to a Berber family. Belachheb's father was a businessman who spent most of his time away for work. His father described him to ABC News in August 1985 as having been a problematic child and said he had often gotten into fights with other children. As a result, he was frequently subject to corporal punishment. His family later moved with Belachheb to Fez due to the issues he caused. On June 21, 1963, Belachheb stabbed a man with a pocketknife in Casablanca. He was charged at Taza regional court, but not convicted, with records indicating that he skipped trial. Shortly after, at age 19, Belachheb travelled to Europe, with his family claiming it was to study welding and mechanics.

Following his arrival in France, Belachheb moved to Spain, Switzerland, and the Netherlands, where he failed to obtain work permits, before settling in Brussels, Belgium in summer 1965. In October 1967, Belachheb married a local woman and had two children with her. He was regularly unfaithful and beat her. Between 1965 and 1973, Belachheb was regularly imprisoned by Belgian authorities, most often for assault and convicted once of carrying a prohibited firearm. He also served two years imprisonment in Kuwait for robbery. Since the early 1970s, Belachheb was noted for alcohol abuse, which continued even as he was prescribed Antabus.

On Belachheb's 35th birthday, enraged that there was not enough food in the fridge to prepare the dinner he wanted to make, he nearly beat his wife to death. When his daughter yelled for him to stop, he slapped her. After being treated at the hospital, his wife filed charges against him and filed for divorce. After being released from jail, he returned to Morocco, and immediately sought to find a new country to live in. He was tried and convicted in absentia for the assault of his wife and daughter, and faced a two-year prison sentence.

Belachheb was able to enter the United States on a tourist visa despite the fact he was a fugitive in Belgium and Morocco. His application for entry may have involved fraud. As American embassies began a policy of destroying visa records and associated documentation after a one-year period after the Iran hostage crisis, it could not be precisely determined what Belachheb had done to enter the country. Belachheb claimed to have been rejected by The Netherlands, Canada, Italy, and Switzerland, but not the U.S. The agencies involved in processing his application each deflected blame for his admission to other agencies.

Belachheb entered on a B-2 visa, which requires the applicant to provide proof they do not plan to stay in America. Holders of a B-2 visa are prohibited from seeking employment. He lied to U.S. consular officials by telling them he had been living in Morocco for the past five years, a requirement for the visa, while he had actually been living in Belgium until a month before he applied. Belachheb denied any criminal activity or mental problems while applying for a visa. Belgian authorities knew him to have 13 assaults, one child beating, two involuntarily hospitalizations due to mental health and alcoholism, two terms in jail, and one on probation on his record, which should have barred Belachheb from entering the country. He received a non-immigrant visa on July 17, 1980, and entered the U.S. on April 22, 1981.

Belachheb illegally searched for a job, in violation of his visa. He married an American citizen, granting him permanent residency in the United States on January 16, 1984. He often beat or threatened his wife. After an argument ten days before the shooting, she told Belachheb that she did not want to speak to or hear from him again. At the trial, she compared him to "a freight train out of control". Belachheb was unemployed. He had previously been employed as a waiter for three weeks at a restaurant in Addison, but quit his job the Wednesday prior to the shooting. Belachheb bought the gun used in the shooting at a pawn shop. Belachheb blamed American women for his problems, and was said to have difficulty adjusting to American society.

== Legal proceedings ==
Belachheb was initially only charged for the death of the woman he had fought with. He was held on US$500,000 bond. Shortly after the shooting, he was placed in solitary confinement under 24-hour suicide watch in jail. The following Monday, he was charged with five additional counts of murder and one count of attempted murder, with a bond of $250,000 on each count. Ianni's reopened for business the same day.

Belachheb plead not guilty by reason of insanity. His defense argued that he had brain damage from repeated blows to the head and was unable to tell right from wrong. A doctor testified at his trial that he had paranoid schizophrenia and was undergoing a seizure at the time of the shooting. Two other psychiatrists testified that he instead had an anti-social personality, but was sane. Additionally, there was no evidence of brain damage and the doctor stated that Belachheb had normal or above average intelligence.

As under Texas law multiple murder was not itself a capital crime, Belachheb could not be sentenced to death. Belachheb was instead sentenced to six consecutive life sentences and fined $70,000, $10,000 for each victim, for the murders, in addition to a $10,000 fine and the maximum 20 years in prison for attempted murder of the seventh victim, to be served consecutively. Belachheb was surprised at the verdict, and thought he would be released from prison. Belachheb was eligible for parole in 2004. During the next legislative session, a "multiple victims" provision was added to Texas's death penalty statute. He appealed his sentence. The courts affirmed the original ruling.

The shooting resulted in criticism of American immigration policy, as Belachheb was able to get a visa despite being a fugitive in both Belgium and Morocco. An August 1985 20/20 broadcast, titled Passport for Murder, featured several witnesses and the surviving victim of the shooting. The main focus of the broadcast was how easy it had been for Belachheb to lie his way into the United States. John McNeill, the injured victim who survived, while discussing Belachheb's admission to America, stated in January 1985 that: "We need to put some pressure on somebody, and we've go to do this together. I didn't appreciate getting blown away, and I think there was negligence there." McNeill and relatives of four of the dead victims sued the Immigration and Naturalization Service, but the lawsuit did not get far. McNeill's attorney stated that "Asking him if he is a nice guy is not an adequate screening procedure."

== Legacy ==
Shortly after the 30th anniversary of the shooting, The Dallas Morning News described it as "Dallas’ worst mass murder", as did the Fort Worth Star-Telegram in 2004.

In 2003, American author Gary M. Lavergne wrote a book about the case, Worse Than Death: The Dallas Nightclub Murders and the Texas Multiple Murder Law, published by University of North Texas Press. He said of Belachheb's fate that "[he] was only happy when he was out roaming the streets and going to bars and trying to pick up women and drinking. So to put him in a cell is true punishment, and for him, I think it's worse than death".

Belachheb died in prison at age 72 on October 19, 2017, of natural causes.
