= Richard Yniguez =

American actor and director (born 1946)

- Born: Richard Yniguez; December 8, 1946 (age 79); Firebaugh, California, U.S.
- Occupations: Actor; Director
- Years active: 1968-present
- Spouse(s): Priscilla Ann Garcia (1969-1974) (divorced, 1 child)

Richard Yniguez (born December 8, 1946) is an American actor and director mainly known for Boulevard Nights, What's Cooking? and The Deadly Tower.

== Film ==
Year	Show Title	Role	Episode / Notes
1974	Together Brothers	Vega	
1975	The Deadly Tower	Ramiro Martinez	
1979	Boulevard Nights	Raymond Avila	
1985	La Negrita: the Miracle of Our Lady of Los Angeles	Don Diego	
1999	Judgment Day	Old Priest	
2000	Chain of Command	Michael Valdez (as Richard Yñiquez)	
2000	What's Cooking?	Robert Avila	
2005	Meet Me in Miami	Julio	
2009	B-Girl	Father Rivera	
2009	Miracle	Carlos Mendez	
2014	Pretty Rosebud	Father Antonio	
2015	Ole Sparky	Father Rodriguez	

== Television ==
Year	Title	Role	Notes
1968	Canción de la raza	Youngest Brother	
1970	Tribes	Sanchez	made-for-TV movie
1973	Hawaii 5-0	Carlos Rojas	S6 E10 A Bullet for El Diablo
1973	Room 222	Tony Rodriguez	S5 E4 No Island Is An Island
1973	Barnaby Jones	Sergeant J.J. Stoner	"Murder-Go-Round"
1981	Simon & Simon	'Chuy'	"Details at Eleven"
1983	The A-Team	Daniel Running Bear	"When Are You Comin' Back, Range Rider?" Part 1 and 2
1983	Hart to Hart	Jack Corey	"Long Lost Love"
1984	Simon & Simon	Eladio Sanchez	"Double Play"
1984	Dynasty	Ernesto Pinero	"The Ring"
1984	Scarecrow and Mrs. King	'El Lagarto'	"I Am Not Now, nor Have I Ever Been... a Spy"
1984	Trapper John, M.D.	Mark Petrie	"Send in the Clowns"
1984	Blue Thunder	Hector Dorado	"Skydiver"
1984	Mama Malone	Father Jose Silva	(13 episodes)
1984	Rituals	Carlos	
1984	Cagney & Lacey	Arturo Perez	"Unusual Occurrence"
1985	Hill Street Blues	Officer Rivera	"Queen for a Day"
1985	Airwolf	Gustavo	"Jennie"
1985	La Negrita: the Miracle of Our Lady of Los Angeles	Don Diego	
1986	Blacke's Magic	Sergeant Diaz	"Prisoner of Paradise"
1986	Simon & Simon	Peruvian Bandit	"Eye of the Beholder"
1986	MacGyver	Emilio (as Richard Yñiguez)	"The Assassin"
1986	Gone to Texas	General Antonio Lopez de Santa Anna	TV movie
1987	Ohara	Detective Jesse Guerrera	(11 episodes)
1988	The Dirty Dozen: The Fatal Mission	Roberto Echevarria (as Richard Yñiguez)	TV movie
1988	Supercarrier	Fraguela	"Rest and Revolution"
1989	Father Dowling Mysteries	Private Eye	"The Mafia Priest Mystery: Part 1"
1989	Jake Spanner, Private Eye	Ben Nunez	TV movie
1989	Crime of Crimes	Paco Mendoza	
1990	Tulare City Limits	Unknown	
1990	The Flash	Peter Paul Aguilar	"Double Vision"
1990	Hunter	Lieutenant David Garner / Raul Marino / Raul Mariano	"Rape and Revenge: Part 1" (1985) "Rape and Revenge: Part 2" (1985) "High Noon in L.A."(1986) "Oh, the Shark Bites!" (1990)
1990	Zorro	Warrior Angry Eyes / Shonay / Casey Hawkes	"The Bounty Hunters" (1990) "Turning the Tables" (1992) "Ultimate Justice" (1992)
1991	Midnight Caller	Father Rogelio Miramontes	"Uninvited Guests"
1993	Firestorm: 72 Hours in Oakland	Captain DeLuna	TV movie
1993	I Can Make You Love Me	Lieutenant Grijalva	TV movie
1993	Rio Diablo	'Chuy'	TV movie
1993	Murder, She Wrote	Sergeant Ignacio Delcanto (as Richard Yñiguez)	"A Virtual Murder"
1994	Confessions: Two Faces of Evil	Detective Christianson	TV movie
1995	Live Shot	Chief Manny Padilla "Day One"	
1995	Land's End	Mr. Lugo "Day of the Dead"	
1996	The Sentinel	Sandoval	"Flight"
1996	The Burning Zone	First Officer Espinoza (as Richard Yñiguez)	"Night Flight"
1997	Pacific Blue	Eduardo Galvez	"Black Pearl"
1997	Nash Bridges	Tony Sanchez	"Inside Out"
1997	The Second Civil War	Javier Clark	TV movie
1998	413 Hope St.	Unknown	Falling
1998	Babylon 5	Montoya	"Darkness Ascending" "Meditations on the Abyss"
1999	Judgment Day	Old Priest	Video
2000	A Family in Crisis: The Elian Gonzales Story	Unknown	TV movie
2000	Frankie & Hazel	Antonio Perez (as Richard Yñiguez)	TV movie
2001	Carmen: A Hip Hopera	Dick	TV movie
2001	Mysterious Ways	Javier	"A Time to Every Purpose"
2002	Law & Order: Dead on the Money	Carlos Ortiz (voice)	Video Game
2003	CSI: Miami	Lorenzo Escalante (as Richard Yñiguez)	"Simple Man"
2003	The Shield	Jesus Latigo	"Co-Pilot"
2004	She Spies	Pedro Santiago	"Family Reunion"
2005	Medical Investigation	Unknown	"Mission La Roca: Part 2"
2008	Ylse	Hector Sr.	
