= Boulevard Nights =

1979 film directed by Michael Pressman

- VHS cover
- Directed by: Michael Pressman
- Written by: Desmond Nakano
- Produced by: Bill Benenson
- Starring: Richard Yniguez; Danny De La Paz; Marta DuBois; Carmen Zapata; James Victor; Victor Millan; Daniel Zacapa
- Cinematography: John Bailey
- Edited by: Richard Halsey
- Music by: Lalo Schifrin
- Distributed by: Warner Bros. Pictures
- Release date: March 23, 1979
- Running time: 102 minutes
- Country: United States
- Language: English
- Budget: $2.5 million
- Box office: $1.9 million (US rentals)

Boulevard Nights is a 1979 American neo noir hood film and crime film directed by Michael Pressman.

It was filmed on location, mostly in East Los Angeles.

== Plot ==
It is about life in East Los Angeles and its street gangs. It concerns two brothers, Raymond (Richard Yniguez) and Chuco (Danny De La Paz). Raymond is "straight"—he has a job and is engaged to Shady (Marta DuBois) -- while Chuco is a drug user and gang member who is about to be drawn into a gang war.

== Cast ==
- Richard Yniguez ... Raymond Avila
- Danny De La Paz ... Chuco Avila
- Marta DuBois ... Shady Londeros
- James Victor ... Gil Moreno
- Betty Carvalho ... Mrs. Avila
- Carmen Zapata ... Mrs. Londeros
- Victor Millan ... Mr. Londeros
- Gary Cervantes ... Big Happy
- Daniel Zacapa ... Ernie (as Garret Pearson)
- Jerado Carmona ... Wolf
- Jesse Aragon ... Casper
- Robert Covarrubias ... Toby (as Roberto Covarrubia)
- Eliseo Estrada ... Hopper
- Mary McFerren ... Receptionist
- Dawson Mays ... Jerry Werner
- Alejandrino Morales ... VGV Gang Member
- Mario Morales ... VGV Gang Member
- Javier Morales ... VGV Gang Member

== Production ==
=== Development ===
The film began as a script written in 1977 by Desmond Nakano while he was a student in Paul Schrader's screenwriting class at UCLA. Schrader had assigned students to find an article in the Los Angeles Times they thought would make a good subject for a film, then come up with a story for it. Nakano picked an article about car clubs and gangs in East Los Angeles.

== Controversy ==
Boulevard Nights was one of a number of "gang / hood films" released in 1979, along with The Warriors, Walk Proud, The Wanderers and Over the Edge. Fearing a repeat of the gang violence associated with The Warriors, Warner Bros. and the filmmakers tried to distance themselves from that film by saying that Boulevard Nights was not so much a gang film as a "family story" of two brothers "set in a gang environment."

A week before releasing the film, Warner Bros. offered theater owners the option of hiring security at the studio's expense if they felt the need; officially fewer than half a dozen theaters added security. Boulevard Nights was pulled from San Francisco's Alhambra Theatre and an Ontario, California drive-in after incidents of gang-related violence broke out during showings of the film at those locations. The film was also picketed by protesters who said that it negatively stereotyped Mexican Americans as gang members.

== Reception ==
Roger Ebert gave the film two-and-a-half stars out of four and wrote, "It's a movie that tries to tell us something about life in the Mexican-American neighborhoods of East Los Angeles, and that sometimes succeeds. 'Boulevard Nights' is not altogether successful, though, because the truth of the situation has been cluttered up by a story structure borrowed from umpteen other Hollywood movies about coming of age in a ghetto." Vincent Canby of The New York Times wrote the film "is so busy trying to meet the needs of a conventional narrative that it appears to have no point of view about its characters. When we watch them suffer and die in foolish pursuits, the movie is merely sightseeing. With the possible exception of Mr. De La Paz, whose haunted looks suggest someone very troubled, the actors are not very good."

Dale Pollock of Variety wrote, "To label 'Boulevard Nights' simply another gang picture because its milieu is the streets of East Los Angeles would be doing the Tony Bill-Bill Benenson production a disservice. Unfortunately, the film fails to carve out a separate identity of its own, rehashing a familiar story about inter-family conflicts." Gene Siskel of the Chicago Tribune gave the film three stars out of four and wrote that the film had a "quiet power," with Danny De La Paz giving "a memorable performance of a young man lost."

Charles Champlin of the Los Angeles Times called it "a modest, earnest, honest, authentic, dramatic and effective drama," adding, "Without much overt sermonizing, Desmond Nakano's script elonquently demonstrates the somber and tragic defeats that violence inflicts on its winners and losers alike ... It's a cycle of revenge as empty and unavailing (and here not so poetic) as it was in 'Romeo and Juliet.'"

Gary Arnold of The Washington Post called the film "disappointing, since screenwriter Desmond Nakano falls back on some miserable melodramatic devices to force his material to a showdown. A gang bullet meant for Chuco kills dear little Mrs. Avila on the day of Raymond's wedding. Still, it's a respectable, absorbing sort of movie, even though you have to admit it doesn't work." David Ansen of Newsweek wrote, "The setting and the all-Hispanic cast are fresh; the story is, unfortunately, as old as Hollywood."

The film's domestic take of $1.9 million in rentals was considered a box office failure.

== Legacy ==
In 2017, the film was selected for preservation in the United States National Film Registry by the Library of Congress as being "culturally, historically, or aesthetically significant".

In a rare media interview, in 2023, with journalist David Leighton, of the Arizona Daily Star newspaper, Danny De La Paz (who also played Big Puppet in the Edward James Olmos film American Me) reflected back on the film and the time period in which it was released.

“The year 1979 was a year of street gang films with movies like The Warriors, Walk Proud and Boulevard Nights. The Warriors, in my opinion, was like a comic book and was not realistic at all. And Walk Proud, I will call it what it was, Brown Face, an actor Robby Benson pretending to be Chicano."

“My character (Chuco Avila) is a young man without a father, a role being filled by my older brother, (Raymond Avila), and is looking to belong while at the same time trying to find his own individual identity, in the only world he has ever known, in the fictitious Varrio Grande Vista, a neighborhood in the real East Los Angeles.

“The Boulevard Nights script was about what effect this environment had on these two brothers in this period in their lives. The unintentional effect was that it glorified gangs and helped them grow. Although this is what movies do. When I was very young I saw a film and immediately went home and tried to mimic the main character’s actions. It’s the effect films have on some people.

“In regard to the protesters, who picketed outside the theaters that played Boulevard Nights, most of them likely never saw the film. They read about it or heard about it from a friend and just reacted without understanding it.

“One other effect this movie had was, within a few months after it came out, cruising Whittier Boulevard, which is where the film took place got so out of control, law enforcement outlawed it, for a while anyways.”

== See also ==
- List of hood films
- Zoot Suit (1981), another Film Registry inductee with similar content
