= Gary Lavergne =

American non-fiction author (born 1955)

- Born: Gary Mitchell Lavergne; October 28, 1955 (age 71); Church Point, Louisiana, U.S.
- Education: University of Louisiana at Lafayette (BA); McNeese State University
- Occupation: Author
- Spouse: Laura Clayton (m. 1976)
- Children: 4
- Writing career
- Genre: Non-fiction
- Website: garylavergne.com

Gary Mitchell Lavergne (born October 28, 1955) is an American non-fiction author. Among his subjects are killers Charles J. Whitman and Kenneth Allen McDuff.

== Career ==
Lavergne was born on October 28, 1955 Church Point, Louisiana, son of Nolan and Bobbie Lavergne. He attended Church Point High School and graduated in 1973. He earned a Bachelor of Arts degree in social studies education and a master's in education at the University of Louisiana at Lafayette. In 1988, he earned an education specialist degree in educational administration and supervision from McNeese State University. He was a social studies teacher, held administrative positions for both the SAT and the ACT. He worked for the College Board traveling to universities helping administrators understand the SAT.

Lavergne retired as director of admissions research for the University of Texas in 2019. Among Lavergne's books is 1997's A Sniper in the Tower about the 1966 shooting rampage of Charles Whitman, which according to a 2007 Associated Press article is "considered the definitive account of the massacre" and to Frank Rich in a 1997 The New York Times piece is "the authoritative account of the Whitman case". He decided to write the book after watching a TV special on mass murder, realizing that there had never been a book published about the shooting.

He is married to Laura Clayton, with whom he has four children.

== Published works ==
- Before Brown (2010), about the struggle for civil rights in higher education, centered on the Sweatt v. Painter case at the University of Texas at Austin.
- Worse than Death (2003), discusses the 1984 Dallas nightclub shooting, perpetrated by Abdelkrim Belachheb. Published by UNT Press.
- Bad Boy from Rosebud (1999), about serial killer Kenneth McDuff. Published by UNT Press.
- A Sniper in the Tower (1997), about Charles Whitman, who shot people from the University of Texas at Austin's tower in 1966. Published by UNT Press.
