= Ramiro Martinez (police officer) =

American police officer (born 1937)

Ramiro "Ray" Martinez (born January 20, 1937) is a former Austin Police Department officer whose actions contributed to the ending of the University of Texas tower shootings when he, two other officers and a deputized civilian reached and killed sniper Charles Whitman on August 1, 1966.

== Early life ==
Martinez was born in Kent County, Texas and graduated from Rotan High School in 1956. He enrolled in the University of Texas at Austin, but dropped out for financial reasons. After three years as a combat medic in the United States Army, he joined the Austin Police Department, graduating from the police academy in 1961.

== Texas Tower ==
Martinez was off duty on August 1, 1966, when he learned via television of the Texas Tower sniper shooting. Arriving at the campus, Martinez went to the top of the tower with civilian Allen Crum. Martinez dislodged a dolly used by Whitman to block the door that led to the observation deck of the Main Building tower at the University of Texas at Austin. Martinez and Crum went out the door, and as Crum guarded the South side, Martinez went around the Southeast side to find the shooter(s). Officer Houston McCoy came to the top of the tower with Officer Jerry Day. Crum told the officers where Martinez was. McCoy, armed with a shotgun, caught up with Martinez and they noticed Whitman sitting in an opposite corner. Martinez jumped out and fired in the direction of Whitman, missing with all of his revolver shots. McCoy leaped out while Martinez was firing and saw Whitman's head looking over the light ballast, McCoy fired at the top of the ballast, hitting Whitman between the eyes with several pellets, killing Whitman instantly.

McCoy fired again, hitting Whitman on his left side. Martinez grabbed McCoy's shotgun, ran to Whitman's prone body, and fired a direct shotgun blast into deceased Whitman's left arm.

== Aftermath ==
In 1976 Martinez received an undisclosed out-of-court settlement after suing the producers of the made-for-TV film The Deadly Tower for negative and racist depictions of his wife, portrayed in the movie as a nagging Hispanic woman; in fact she is a blonde, blue-eyed German.

Martinez left the Police Department around 1968 and briefly ran a restaurant. In 1969 he joined the Texas Department of Public Safety as a narcotics agent, then four years later joined the Texas Rangers, where he was part of the task force that brought about the indictment of George Parr, the "Duke of Duval County". After retiring from the Rangers in 1991, he worked as a private investigator and served four years as a Justice of the Peace in Comal County.

His self-published memoir, They Call Me Ranger Ray, appeared in 2005. On the 40th Anniversary of the tower shootings, the City of Austin proclaimed August 1, 2006 "Ramiro Martinez Day".
