= Charles Whitman =

American mass murderer (1941–1966)

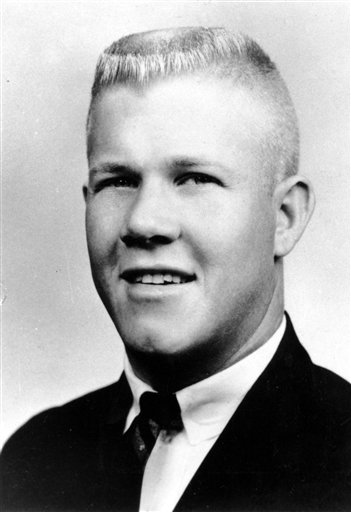
- Whitman in 1963
- Born: Charles Joseph Whitman; June 24, 1941; Lake Worth, Florida, U.S.
- Died: August 1, 1966 (aged 25); Austin, Texas, U.S.
- Cause of death: Gunshot wounds
- Resting place: Hillcrest Memorial Park, West Palm Beach, Florida, U.S.
- Other name: The Texas Tower Sniper
- Known for: Perpetrator of the University of Texas tower shooting
- Spouse: Kathy Leissner (m. 1962; died 1966)
- Motive: Inconclusive, possible violent impulsive behavior caused by brain tumor pressing against his amygdala

Details
- Date: August 1, 1966: Mother and wife: c. 12:15–3:00 a.m.; Random: 11:48 a.m. – 1:24 p.m.
- Location: University of Texas at Austin
- Targets: Mother, wife, random strangers
- Killed: 17 (Note: The number of fatalities includes the perpetrator's mother and wife, an unborn child, and a man who died in 2001 from injuries sustained in the shooting.)
- Injured: 31
- Weapons: Remington 700 ADL (6mm); Universal M1 carbine; Remington Model 141 (.35-caliber); Sears model 60 semi-automatic shotgun (12 gauge); S&W Model 19 (.357 Magnum); Luger P08 (9mm); Galesi-Brescia pistol (.25 ACP); Bayonet; Machete (unused); Hatchet (unused); Three knives (unused)
- Military career
- Allegiance: United States
- Branch: United States Marine Corps
- Rank: Lance Corporal

Charles Joseph Whitman (June 24, 1941 – August 1, 1966) was an American mass murderer who committed the 1966 University of Texas tower shooting, one of the first mass shootings in modern American history to receive widespread national media coverage. A former Marine and architectural engineering student at the University of Texas at Austin, Whitman killed 17 people and wounded 31 others on August 1, 1966, in a series of attacks that began the night before when he stabbed his mother and wife to death in their respective homes. Armed with multiple rifles and other weapons, he fatally shot three people inside UT Austin's Main Building, then accessed the 28th-floor observation deck on the building's clock tower. There, he fired at random people for 96 minutes, killing an additional eleven people and wounding 31 others before he was shot dead by the Austin Police Department.

Whitman was born and raised in Lake Worth, Florida, the eldest of three sons in a prosperous but troubled household dominated by his physically abusive father, Charles A. Whitman Sr. He demonstrated exceptional intelligence from an early age, achieving the rank of Eagle Scout at 12 and later enlisting in the United States Marine Corps at 18. He was stationed at Guantanamo Bay and earned the rank of Lance Corporal, but his military career was marked by disciplinary problems. After receiving an engineering scholarship, he enrolled at the University of Texas at Austin in 1961, where he initially excelled academically before his performance declined.

In the years preceding the attack, Whitman experienced significant personal and psychological difficulties. He sought psychiatric help at the university health center, where he reportedly expressed violent ideations to a counselor. He also complained of severe headaches and periods of irrational rage that he himself found disturbing and described at length in personal writings. A posthumous autopsy revealed a glioblastoma multiforme tumor pressing on his amygdala, a brain region associated with emotional regulation and fear response, prompting ongoing debate among medical experts and historians as to what degree the tumor may have contributed to his violent behavior.

The University of Texas tower shooting had a lasting impact on American law enforcement and public safety policy. The attack is widely credited with spurring the creation of SWAT teams across the United States, as police were initially ill-equipped to respond to a sniper entrenched at such an elevated position. Whitman's case also became a landmark in the study of neurological factors in criminal behavior, and his story has been the subject of numerous documentaries, books, and academic studies.

== Early life and education ==
=== Childhood ===
Charles Whitman was born on June 24, 1941, in Lake Worth, Florida, the eldest of three sons born to Margaret E. (née Hodges) and Charles Adolphus Whitman Jr. Whitman's father was raised in an orphanage in Savannah, Georgia, and described himself as a self-made man. His wife, Margaret, was 17 years old at the time they met. The marriage of Whitman's parents was marred by domestic violence; Whitman's father was an admitted authoritarian who provided for his family but demanded near perfection from all of them. He was known to be physically and emotionally abusive towards his wife and children. One neighbor of the Whitmans, Judi Faulch, would later state she was unable to recollect the number of times her own parents had called police in the 1940s and '50s in response to Whitman's father beating his wife, children, and family pets.

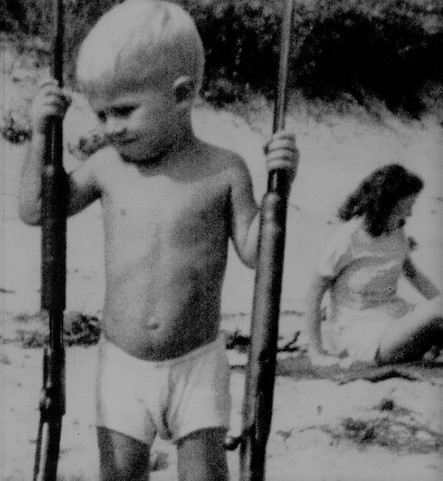
Whitman, age two, c. early 1944

As a boy, Whitman was described as a polite child who seldom lost his temper. He was extremely intelligent—an examination at the age of six revealed his IQ to be 139. Whitman's academic achievements were encouraged by his parents, and any indication of failure or a lethargic attitude were met with discipline—often physical—from his father.

Margaret was a devout Roman Catholic who raised her sons in the same faith. The Whitman brothers regularly attended Mass with their mother, and all three brothers served as altar boys at the Sacred Heart Roman Catholic Church in Lake Worth.

Whitman's father was a firearms collector and enthusiast, who taught each of his young sons to shoot, clean, and maintain weapons. He regularly took them on hunting trips, and Charles became an avid hunter and accomplished marksman. His father said of him: "Charlie could plug the eye out of a squirrel by the time he was sixteen."

Whitman joined the Boy Scouts of America at age 11. He became an Eagle Scout at twelve years three months, reportedly the youngest of any Eagle Scout up to that time. Whitman also became an accomplished pianist at the age of 12. At around the same time, he began an extensive newspaper route.

=== High school ===
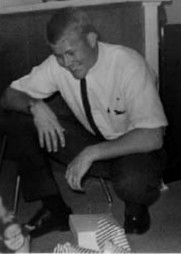
Whitman around 1959 (age 18)

In September 1955, Whitman entered St. Ann's High School in West Palm Beach, where he was regarded as a moderately popular student. By the next month, he had saved enough money from his newspaper route to purchase a Harley-Davidson motorcycle, which he used on his route.

Without telling his father beforehand, Whitman enlisted in the United States Marine Corps one month after his June 1959 graduation from high school, where he had graduated seventh in a class of 72 students. Whitman told a family friend that the catalyst for his enlistment was an incident a month earlier, in which his father had beaten him and thrown him into the family swimming pool because Whitman had come home drunk. Whitman left home on July 6, having been assigned an eighteen-month tour of duty with the Marines at Guantánamo Bay, Cuba. As Whitman traveled toward Parris Island, his father, who still had not known of Whitman's enlistment, learned of his action and telephoned a branch of the federal government trying to have his son's enlistment canceled.

=== U.S. Marine and preparatory school ===
During Whitman's initial eighteen-month service in 1959 and 1960, he earned a sharpshooter's badge and the Marine Corps Expeditionary Medal. He achieved 215 of 250 possible points on marksmanship tests, doing well when shooting rapidly over long distances as well as at moving targets. After completing his assignment, Whitman applied for a scholarship to the Naval Enlisted Science and Education Program (NESEP), an initiative designed to send enlisted personnel to college to train as engineers, and after graduation, be commissioned as officers. Whitman earned high scores on the required examination, and the selection committee approved his enrollment at a preparatory school in Maryland, where he completed courses in mathematics and physics before being approved to transfer to the University of Texas at Austin to study mechanical engineering.

== University life ==
In September 1961, Whitman entered the mechanical engineering program at UT Austin. He was initially a good student. His hobbies included karate, scuba diving, gambling, and hunting. Shortly after his enrollment, Whitman and two friends were observed poaching a deer, with a passerby recording his license plate number and reporting them to the police. The trio were butchering the deer in the shower at Whitman's dormitory when they were arrested. Whitman was fined $100 ($1,100 in 2025) for the offense.

Whitman earned a reputation as a practical joker in his years as an engineering student, but his friends also noted he made some morbid and chilling statements. In 1962, he remarked to a fellow student, "A person could stand off an army from atop of [the Main Building's clock tower] before they got him."

=== Marriage ===
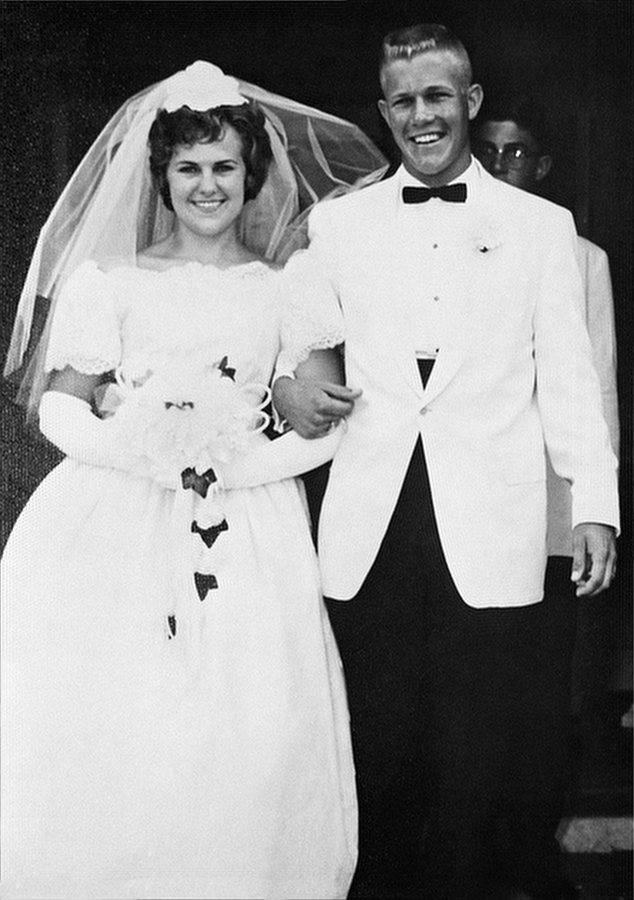
Whitman and Leissner at their wedding in 1962

In February 1962, 20-year-old Whitman met Kathleen Frances Leissner, an education major three years his junior. Leissner was Whitman's first serious girlfriend; he briefly dated actress Deanna Dunagan just prior to beginning his relationship with Leissner. They courted for five months before announcing their engagement on July 19.

On August 17, 1962, Whitman and Leissner were married at St. Michael's Catholic Church in Leissner's hometown of Needville, Texas. The couple chose the 22nd wedding anniversary of Whitman's parents as the date for their wedding. Whitman's family drove from Florida to attend the event, and his younger brother Patrick served as best man. Father Leduc, a Whitman family friend, presided over the ceremony. Leissner's family and friends approved of her choice of husband, describing Whitman as a "handsome young man" who was both intelligent and aspirational.

Although Whitman's grades improved somewhat during his second and third semesters, the Marines considered them insufficient for continuation of his scholarship. He was ordered to active duty in February 1963 and went to Camp Lejeune in North Carolina, for the remainder of his five-year enlistment.

=== Camp Lejeune ===
Whitman apparently resented his college studies being ended, although he was automatically promoted to the rank of Lance Corporal. At Camp Lejeune, he was hospitalized for four days after single-handedly freeing another Marine by lifting a Jeep which had rolled over an embankment.

Despite his reputation as an exemplary Marine, Whitman continued to gamble. In November 1963, he was court-martialed for gambling, usury, possession of a personal firearm on base, and threatening another Marine over a $30 loan ($300 in 2025) for which he had demanded $15 in interest. Sentenced to thirty days of confinement and ninety days of hard labor, he was demoted from lance corporal (E-3) to private (E-1).

=== Psychological frustrations ===
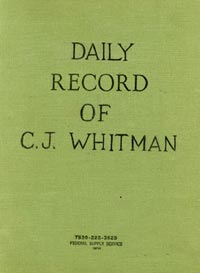
Whitman's journal

While awaiting his court-martial in 1963, Whitman began to write a diary titled Daily Record of C. J. Whitman. In it, he wrote about his daily life in the Marine Corps and his interactions with his wife and other family members. He also wrote about his upcoming court-martial and contempt for the Marine Corps, criticizing them for inefficiencies. In his writings about Leissner, Whitman often praised her and expressed his longing to be with her. He also wrote about his efforts and plans to free himself from financial dependence on his father.

In December 1964, Whitman was honorably discharged from the Marine Corps. He returned to UT Austin, enrolling in the architectural engineering program. To support his wife and himself, he worked as a bill collector for the Standard Finance Company. Later, he worked as a bank teller at the Austin National Bank. In January 1965, Whitman took a temporary job with Central Freight Lines as a traffic surveyor for the Texas Highway Department, while his wife worked as a biology teacher at Lanier High School. He was also a volunteer scout leader with Austin Scout Troop 5.

In an effort to obtain his engineering degree faster, Whitman undertook a full academic workload. By 1966, he had also studied for and passed a state licensing exam for real-estate agents. As the teaching salary Whitman's wife earned was insufficient to sustain the lifestyle the couple desired, both also held part-time jobs.

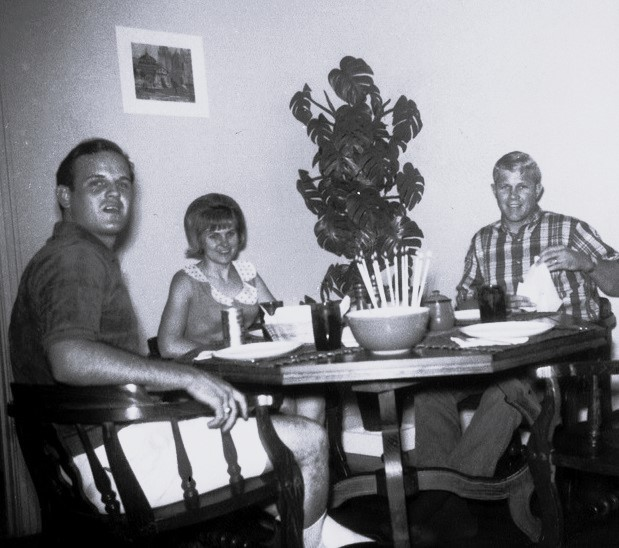
Whitman (right), pictured with his wife, Kathleen, and friend Larry Fuess in May 1966

Friends later said that Whitman had told them that he struck his wife on three occasions. They said that Whitman despised himself for this and confessed to being "mortally afraid of being like his father." In his journal, Whitman lamented his actions and resolved to be a good husband and not abusive as his father had been.

=== Parents' divorce ===
In May 1966, Whitman's mother announced her decision to divorce her husband because of his continued physical abuse. Upon receipt of this news, Whitman immediately drove overnight to Florida to help his mother move to Austin. He was reportedly so afraid that his father would resort to violence against his mother as she prepared to leave that he summoned a local policeman to remain outside the house while she packed her belongings. Whitman's youngest brother, John, also left Lake Worth and moved to Austin with his mother. Patrick Whitman, the middle son, remained in Florida and worked in his father's plumbing supply business.

In Austin, Whitman's mother took a job as a cashier in a local cafeteria and moved into her own apartment, though she remained in close contact with him. Whitman's father later said he had spent more than $1,000 ($10,500 in 2025) on long-distance phone calls to both his wife and his son, begging his wife to return and asking his son to convince her to come back. During this stressful time, Whitman was abusing amphetamines and began experiencing severe headaches, which he described as being "tremendous".

=== Physician consultations ===
Investigating officers found that Whitman had visited several UT Austin physicians in the year before the shootings who prescribed various medications for him. Whitman had seen at least five doctors between the fall and winter of 1965 before he visited a psychiatrist from whom he received no prescription. At some other time he was prescribed Valium by Jan Cochrum, who recommended he visit the campus psychiatrist. He did not have a pre-existing diagnosis of mental illness.

At the urging of his wife, on one occasion approximately two weeks after his parents' separation, Whitman sought professional help from a campus psychiatrist named Maurice Dean Heatly on March 29, 1966 to discuss the sources of pressure, frustration, and distress within his life. Heatly's notes regarding this two-hour session reveal Whitman—whom Heatly observed to be a somewhat self-centered and egocentric individual—had disclosed that he constantly strove to better himself and that he had endured increasingly frequent headaches. Whitman also revealed his sense of self-loathing over the fact that he had twice struck his wife throughout the course of their marriage, his resultant fear of becoming a frequent woman beater in the mold of his "demanding" father, and his frustration regarding his father's almost daily phone calls to him pleading with him to persuade his mother to return to Florida.

Dr. Heatly's notes from this session also reveal that Whitman had been "oozing with hostility" throughout the entire session, that he had sensed something was wrong with himself, and that Whitman had disclosed his developing fantasies of shooting random people from the observation deck of the UT Tower. Although Dr. Heatly scheduled a further counseling session for the following week, Whitman chose not to attend. (Note: This would prove to be the sole occasion in which Whitman sought any form of professional help pertaining to the sources of frustration and pressure in his life.)

Whitman referred to his visit with Maurice Heatly in his final suicide note, writing: "I talked with a Doctor once for about two hours and tried to convey to him my fears that I felt come [sic] overwhelming violent impulses. After one visit, I never saw the Doctor again, and since then have been fighting my mental turmoil alone, and seemingly to no avail".

University of Texas Staff psychiatrist Heatly's notes on the visit said, "This massive, muscular youth seemed to be oozing with hostility [...] that something seemed to be happening to him and that he didn't seem to be himself." "He readily admits having overwhelming periods of hostility with a very minimum of provocation. Repeated inquiries attempting to analyze his exact experiences were not too successful with the exception of his vivid reference to 'thinking about going up on the tower with a deer rifle and start shooting people.'"

In the 2024 publication, Cause of Death: Ballistic Trauma, the author (a retired medical oncologist) evaluated Whitman's personality and behaviours using established criteria from the Diagnostic and Statistical Manual of Mental Disorders. It was concluded that Whitman did not meet criteria for any recognized psychiatric illness such as schizophrenia or paranoia, or a personality disorder which might be associated with violence. The contention that Whitman, as some believed, was a sociopath is not supported by the observations that, 1) he had exemplary childhood conduct and achievements, 2) received the Good Conduct medal as a Marine, 3) was gregarious and well-liked on campus and, 4) had a long term (four-year) monogamous relationship with his wife. It has been speculated that Whitman may have had an acute psychotic breakdown in the hours just before committing the mass murder as indicated by some bizarre acts. One is the fact his siege supplies contained inexplicable amounts of food (including twelve cans and two jars), three and a half gallons of gasoline, and numerous items of uncertain intended use (an alarm clock, a pipe wrench, an extension cord, a compass, and a snake bite kit). All of these items, in addition to seven firearms (three rifles, one shotgun, three handguns) and plenty of ammunition, were carted up a few flights of stairs onto the observation deck level, but not surprisingly, only the weapons were utilized. A second 'bizarre' act occurred when Whitman committed matricide (killed his mother). In a section of Cause of Death: Ballistic Trauma devoted to this topic, it is explained that matricide is an extremely uncommon crime (<1% of homicides committed each year in the U.S.), and that studies indicate that the majority of perpetrators (up to 100%) were experiencing, or had previously experienced, a psychotic disorder (e.g. schizophrenia, delusions, drug-induced psychosis).

It is unknown precisely when Whitman decided to end his life, or when he selected the Main Building of the University of Texas as the location for his act of mass murder. The contents of one of Whitman's suicide notes would reveal that in the months prior to his death, he had become "a victim of many unusual and irrational thoughts" and that since talking with Dr. Heatly, he had been "fighting [his] mental turmoil alone". He is known to have twice visited the observation deck of the UT Tower in the ten days prior to August 1, 1966. On the first occasion, on July 22, he had been in the company of his brother John and a friend; on the second occasion six days later, he had been alone.

== Events leading to the shooting ==
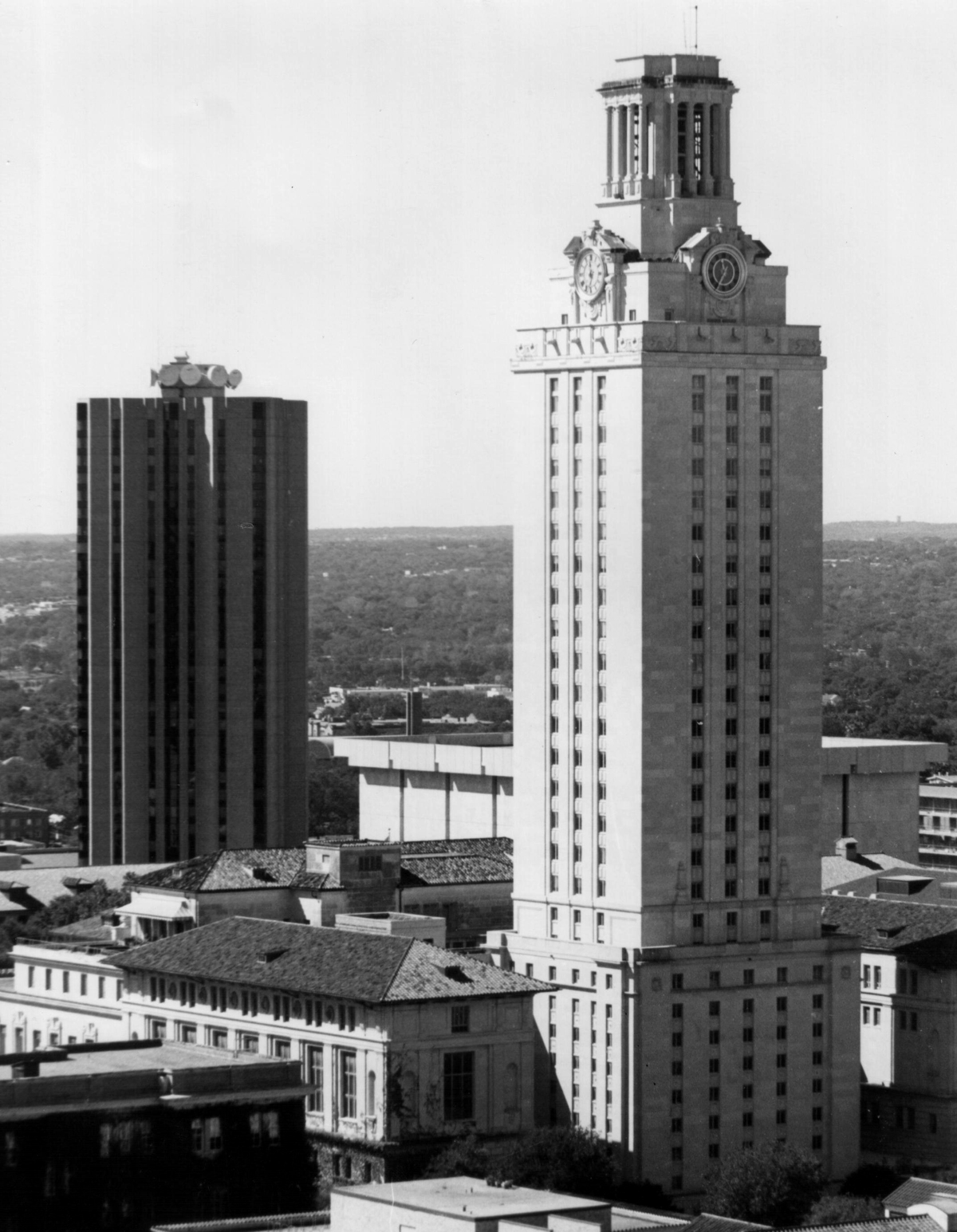
Main building of the University of Texas at Austin. Whitman fired at people on the ground from the observation deck.

On the day before the shootings, Whitman bought a pair of binoculars and a knife from a hardware store, and some Spam from a 7-Eleven convenience store. He picked up his wife from her summer job as a telephone operator before he met his mother for lunch at the Wyatt Cafeteria, which was close to the UT Austin campus.

At about 4:00 p.m. the same day, Whitman and his wife visited their close friends John and Frances Morgan. They left the Morgans' apartment at 5:50 p.m. so Kathy could get to her 6:00–10:00 p.m. shift.

At 6:45 p.m., Whitman began typing his suicide note, a portion of which read:

I don't quite understand what it is that compels me to type this letter. Perhaps it is to leave some vague reason for the actions I have recently performed. I don't really understand myself these days. I am supposed to be an average reasonable and intelligent young man. However, lately (I cannot recall when it started) I have been a victim of many unusual and irrational thoughts. These thoughts constantly recur, and it requires a tremendous mental effort to concentrate on useful and progressive tasks.

In his note, Whitman went on to request an autopsy be performed on his remains after he was dead to determine if there had been a biological cause for his actions and for his continuing and increasingly intense headaches. He also wrote that he had decided to kill both his mother and wife. Expressing uncertainty about his reasons, he nonetheless stated he did not believe his mother had "ever enjoyed life as she is entitled to", and that his wife had "been as fine a wife to me as any man could ever hope to have". Whitman further explained that he wanted to relieve both his wife and mother of the suffering of this world, and to save them the embarrassment of his actions. He did not mention planning the attack at the university.

Just after midnight on August 1, Whitman drove to his mother's apartment at 1212 Guadalupe Street. After killing his mother, he placed her body on her bed and covered it with sheets. How he murdered his mother is disputed, but officials believed he rendered her unconscious before stabbing her in the heart.

He left a handwritten note beside her body, which read in part:

To Whom It May Concern: I have just taken my mother's life. I am very upset over having done it. However, I feel that if there is a heaven she is definitely there now [...] I am truly sorry [...] Let there be no doubt in your mind that I loved this woman with all my heart.

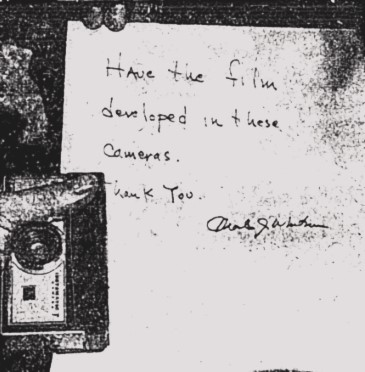
One of the handwritten notes discovered at Whitman's home which he had composed in the hours before his death

Whitman then returned to his home at 906 Jewell Street, where he killed his wife by stabbing her five times in the chest as she slept. He covered her body with sheets, then resumed the typewritten note he had begun the previous evening. Using a ballpoint pen, he wrote at the side of the page:

Friends interrupted. 8-1-66 Mon. 3:00 A.M. BOTH DEAD.

Whitman continued the note, finishing it by pen:

I imagine it appears that I brutally killed both of my loved ones. I was only trying to do a quick thorough job [...] If my life insurance policy is valid please pay off my debts [...] donate the rest anonymously to a mental health foundation. Maybe research can prevent further tragedies of this type [...] Give our dog to my in-laws. Tell them Kathy loved "Schocie" very much [...] If you can find in yourselves to grant my last wish, cremate me after the autopsy.

Whitman also left instructions in the rented house requesting that two rolls of camera film be developed and wrote personal notes to each of his brothers. He last wrote on an envelope labeled "Thoughts for the Day", in which he stored a collection of written admonitions. He added on the outside of the envelope:

8-1-66. I never could quite make it. These thoughts are too much for me.

At 5:45 a.m. on August 1, 1966, Whitman phoned his wife's supervisor at Bell System to explain that Kathy was ill and unable to work that day. He made a similar phone call to his mother's workplace five hours later.

Whitman's final journal entries were written in the past tense, suggesting that he had already killed his wife and mother.

== University of Texas Tower shooting ==
The tower observation deck

At approximately 11:35 a.m., Whitman arrived on the UT Austin campus. He falsely identified himself as a research assistant and told a security guard he was there to deliver equipment. He then climbed to the 28th floor of the Main Building's clock tower, killing three people within the tower, and opened fire from the observation deck with a hunting rifle and other weapons.

Whitman killed 15 people and wounded 31 in the 96 minutes before he was shot and killed. Patrolman Houston McCoy (armed with a shotgun) and Ramiro Martinez of the Austin Police Department had raced to the top of the tower and a combination of shots from both men killed Whitman.

== Death and inquest ==
=== Autopsy ===
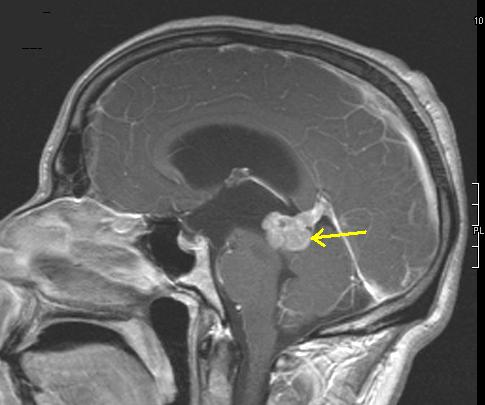
T1-weighted MRI image (sagittal view) of a patient with an astrocytoma (arrow) in roughly the same location and size (~2 cm) as Whitman's causing moderate hydrocephalus.

Although Whitman had been prescribed drugs and was in possession of Dexedrine at the time of his death, the toxicology examination was delayed because his corpse was embalmed on August 1, after it was delivered to the Cook Funeral Home in Austin; however, the autopsy that Whitman had requested in his suicide notes was authorized by his father.

On August 2, Coleman de Chenar, a neuropathologist at Austin State Hospital, realized the autopsy at the funeral home; Whitman's urine and blood were tested for amphetamines and other drugs. During the autopsy, de Chenar reported that he discovered a pecan-sized brain tumor, above the red nucleus, in the white matter below the gray center thalamus, which he identified as an astrocytoma with slight necrosis. De Chenar also noted that, "The skull is unusually thin, 2 to 4 mm," but did not elaborate on the significance of that finding. When that information is combined with the pathological finding of The Connally Commission review (see below) reporting "flattening of the cerebral convolutions, slight", and consider the location of the tumor, it has been proposed that collectively this is good evidence that Whitman had developed obstructive hydrocephalus. This complication of the tumor would certainly explain why Whitman suffered from chronic "tremendous" headaches. Hydrocephalus was not reported by de Chenar, but that anomaly (enlarged cerebral ventricles) could have easily been obscured by the extensive ballistic trauma inflicted by the fatal shotgun blast.

=== Connally commission ===
John Connally, then governor of Texas, commissioned a task force to examine the autopsy findings and material related to Whitman's actions and motives. The commission was composed of neurosurgeons, psychiatrists, pathologists, and psychologists, and included the University of Texas Health Center Directors, John White and Maurice Heatly. The commission's toxicology tests revealed nothing significant. They examined Chenar's paraffin blocks of the brain tumor, stained specimens of it and Whitman's other brain tissue, in addition to the remainder of the autopsy specimens available.

Following a three-hour hearing on August 5, the commission concluded that Chenar's diagnosis of astrocytoma with a small amount of necrosis had been in error. The panel instead found that the tumor had features of a glioblastoma multiforme (GBM), with widespread areas of necrosis, palisading of cells, and a "remarkable vascular component" described as having "the nature of a small congenital vascular malformation". GBM is a relatively uncommon type of tumor, and associated with average age at the time of diagnosis being 64 years. These two facts, the development of an uncommon tumor type at a young age (25 years), suggest that it may have arisen as a consequence of carcinogenic exposure. Chapter 27 in Cause of Death: Ballistic Trauma is devoted to explaining how Whitman's service at Camp Lejeune, with the well-publicized disclosure of the contamination the drinking water supply with neurotoxic and carcinogenic volatile organic compounds, may have resulted in him developing this cancer.

Psychiatric contributors to the report concluded that "the relationship between the brain tumor and [...] Whitman's actions [...] cannot be established with clarity. However, the [...] tumor conceivably could have contributed to his inability to control his emotions and actions". The neurologists and neuropathologists were more circumspect, concluding that, "[t]he application of existing knowledge of organic brain function does not enable us to explain the actions of Whitman on August first".

Forensic investigators have theorized that the tumor pressed against Whitman's amygdala, a part of the brain related to anxiety and fight-or-flight responses among numerous other functions. In Cause of Death: Ballistic Trauma, an alternative mechanism of pathophysiology is postulated involving temporal lobe seizures. The location of Whitman's tumor in, or adjacent to, his right temporal lobe makes this a definite possibility. One common subtype of temporal lobe seizure is referred to as 'focal awareness', which does not necessarily generalize to cause loss of consciousness or whole body convulsions. This subtype can result the sudden onset of emotional alterations in affected individuals manifesting as fear, panic, anger, anxiety, sense of deja vu or sense of jamais vu. The substantial evidence that Whitman was indeed suffering from recurrent temporal lobe focal awareness seizures is carefully examined in four different chapters. It is known that long-term temporal lobe seizures can result in "a wide range of cognitive, psychiatric, and behavioural problems ..." Because Whitman never underwent the definitive test for detecting seizure activity, an electroencephalogram (EEG), this pathophysiological mechanism remains speculative, but certainly represents a credible 'clinical diagnosis'. This novel mechanism, which is associated with an expanded potential for detrimental effects on an individual’s behaviour, including violence and poor judgement, strongly supports the belief that Whitman was suffering from 'organic brain disease'. Irritation of the amygdala and the effects of temporal lobe seizures are not mutually exclusive pathophysiological mechanisms.

== Funeral ==
A joint Catholic funeral service for Whitman and his mother was held in Lake Worth, Florida, on August 5, 1966. They were buried in Florida's Hillcrest Memorial Park. Since he was a military veteran, Whitman was buried with military honors; his casket was draped with the American flag. His remains were exhumed a few days after this burial, since it was determined that the criminal investigation required additional pathological material. Without their knowledge, or consent from his family, Whitman's brain was retained for "special research" to be conducted at the M.D, Anderson Cancer Center in Houston. The final disposition of his brain is unclear. It may have been transferred to a collection started by de Chenar at the Texas State Hospital. During a 2014 audit of the collection to account for missing specimens, it was determined that some had been disposed of due to degradation and others loaned to another institute for study. Whitman's brain was not identified during that investigation and its fate is unknown.

== Brother's killing ==
On July 3, 1973, Charles' youngest brother, John, then 24, was shot and killed during a fight in Lake Worth, Florida. Two men, Ceotis Burgess and Clint Jones, were later charged with murder and conspiracy respectively for the shooting. Burgess was convicted of an unspecified degree of homicide for the shooting and was sentenced to fifteen years but served only five. Whitman's father later sued the bar for his son's death and won over $200,000 in 1980.

== See also ==
- List of disasters in the United States by death toll
- List of school massacres by death toll
- The Deadly Tower (1975 film)
- Tower (2016 film)
- Targets (1968 film)
- Slacker (1990 film)

== Bibliography ==
- Cawthorne, Nigel (2007). Serial Killers And Mass Murderers: Profiles of the World's Most Barbaric Criminals. Ulysses Press. ISBN 978-1-56975-578-5.
- Coleman, Loren (2004). The Copycat Effect: How the Media and Popular Culture Trigger the Mayhem in Tomorrow's Headlines. Paraview Pocket Books. ISBN 978-0-7434-8223-3.
- Douglas, John; Burgess, Ann W.; Burgess, Allen G.; Ressler, Robert K. (2011). Crime Classification Manual: A Standard System for Investigating and Classifying Violent Crimes (2 ed.). John Wiley & Sons. ISBN 978-1-118-04718-7.
- Douglas, John; Olshaker, Mark (1999). The Anatomy of Motive. New York: Scribner. ISBN 978-0-7567-5292-7.
- Franscell, Ron (2011). Delivered from Evil: True Stories of Ordinary People Who Faced Monstrous Mass Killers and Survived. Fair Winds Press. ISBN 978-1-61059-494-3.
- Freberg, Laura (2009). Discovering Biological Psychology (2 ed.). Cengage Learning. ISBN 978-0-547-17779-3.
- Lavergne, Gary M. (1997). A Sniper in the Tower. Denton, Texas: University of North Texas Press. ISBN 978-1-57441-029-7.
- Lester, David (2004). Mass Murder: The Scourge of the 21st Century. Nova Publishers. ISBN 978-1-59033-929-9.
- Levin, Jack; Fox, James Alan (1985). Mass Murder: America's Growing Menace. New York: Plenum Press. ISBN 978-0-306-41943-0.
- Martinez, Ramiro (2005). They Call Me Ranger Ray: From the UT Tower Sniper to Corruption in South Texas. New Braunfels, Texas: Rio Bravo Publishing. ISBN 978-0-9760162-0-5.
- McNab, Chris (2009). Deadly Force: Firearms and American Law Enforcement, from the Wild West to the Streets of Today. Osprey Publishing. ISBN 978-1-84603-376-6.
- Mayo, Mike (2008). American Murder: Criminals, Crimes and the Media. Visible Ink Press. ISBN 978-1-57859-256-2.
- Morris, Ray Jr. (2009). The Time of My Life: Remembrances of the 20th Century. Dog Ear Publishing. ISBN 978-1-60844-142-6.
- Ramsland, Katherine M. (2005). Inside the Minds of Mass Murderers: Why They Kill. Greenwood Publishing Group. ISBN 978-0-275-98475-5.
- Thompson, James G. (2003). Complete Guide to United States Marine Corps Medals, Badges, and Insignia: World War II to Present. Medals of America Press. ISBN 978-1-884452-42-0.
- The Editors of Time-Life Books, ed. (1993). Mass Murderers. Time-Life Books. ISBN 978-0-7835-0004-1.
- Tobias, Ronald (1981). They Shoot to Kill: A Psycho-History of Criminal Sniping. Boulder, Colorado: Paladin Press. ISBN 978-0-87364-207-1.
- Young, Young (June 28, 2024). Cause of Death: Ballistic Trauma. Canada: FriesenPress. ISBN 978-1739001803.
- Governor (September 8, 1966). "Report to the Governor, Medical Aspects, Charles J. Whitman Catastrophe" (PDF). alt.cimedia.com. p. 3. Archived from the original (PDF) on December 15, 2017.
