= Galesi-Brescia =

Italian gun manufacturer

Galesi Arms was an Italian gun manufacturer formally named Industria Armi Galesi which was founded in 1910. It was based in Collebeato, on the northern outskirts of Brescia.

== History ==
The company was founded by Galesi Giuseppe Nicola, and was initially named Galesi F.lli, (Galesi Brothers), though it later became known as Armi Galesi (AG) or Industria Armi Galesi (IAG). The company manufactured patented automatic pistols, rifles and revolvers, but was most well-known for their small semi-automatics. They began to produce their pistols in 1914, following Italy's entry into World War I. Galesi Arms moved production from Trento to Collebeato, located in Brescia, beginning in the year 1921. In 1924, it had 25 workmen and a hydro-electric machine that had the power of 25 to 30 horses. The majority of their pistols were manufactured from 1960 to 1970, and the company went out of business in the 1970s due to the law preventing the import of their pistols to the United States which was by far their biggest consumer, though similar pistols were produced by the company "Rigarmi", which was opened by Guerrino, one of the sons of the company's founder. Rigarmi is still in operation today.

== Products ==
The first design was a 6.35mm blow-back design based on the Browning 1906. This was the Brevetto 5 (Italian for "Model" or "Patent" number 5). Galesi Arms would continue to do more designs including the Brevetto 9 (a longer version of the Brevetto 5) and the 500 series, which included 14 designs ranging from Brevetto 503 to Brevetto 517. These were various other small, semi-auto blowback pistols in calibers varying from .22 Short, .22 Long, .22 LR, .25 ACP and .32 ACP.

== Model list ==
- 5: Copy of the Baby Browning
- 9: A Model 5 with a longer slide and barrel.
- 503/A: calibers .25 ACP, .22 Short, .22 Long. Overall length was 114mm, bronzed with black plates of stick; Grips made of stamped steel.
- 503/B: Bronzed white plates
- 504: chrome, white plates
- 505/B: chrome, engraved, white plates
- 505/EL: engraved, plated gold, plates out of mother-of-pearl, case out of leather
- 506/A: Slightly larger, cal 22 LR - overall length 132mm, bronzed with black plates of stick
- 506/B: Bronzed white plates
- 507: chrome, white plates
- 508/B: chrome, engraved, white plates
- 508/EL: engraved, plated gold, plates out of mother-of-pearl, case out of leather
- 512/A: cal 7.65 – overall length 155mm, bronzed with black plates of stick
- 512/B: Bronzed white plates
- 513: chrome, white plates
- 514/B: chrome, engraved, white plates
- 514/EL: engraved, plated gold, plates out of mother-of-pearl, case out of leather
- 515/A: cal 7.65 - overall length 180mm, bronzed with black plates of stick
- 515/B: Bronzed white plates
- 516: chrome, white plates
- 517/B: chrome, engraved, white plates
- 517/EL: engraved, plated gold, plates out of mother-of-pearl, case out of leather
