= List of Culver Academies people =

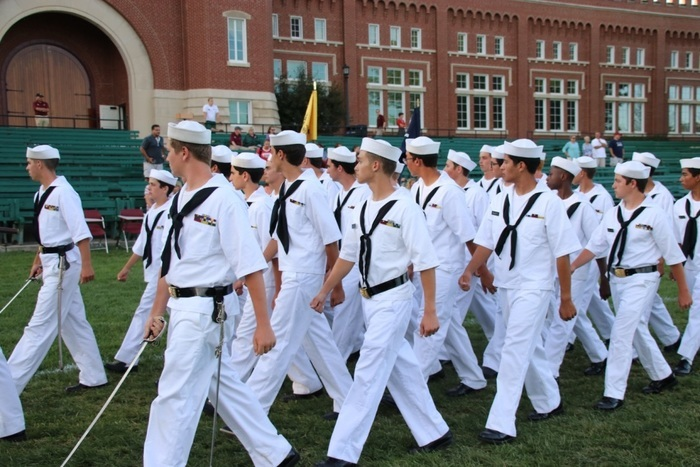
Culver Summer Naval School cadets marching in a military parade, 2017

This list contains notable people associated with Culver Academies in Culver, Indiana, including alumni, former, and current faculty.

== Alumni ==
- Bud Adams, owner of NFL's Tennessee Titans
- Alexander, Crown Prince of Yugoslavia
- Robert Baer, retired CIA officer and author
- Alberto Baillères, billionaire
- Frank Batten, founder of Landmark Communications, The Weather Channel and weather.com
- Dierks Bentley, musician
- Ara Berberian, opera singer
- Pablo Bernal, Spanish track cyclist
- Elizabeth Bernstein, Wall Street Journal journalist
- Michael Brun, electronic musician and DJ
- David Burpee, experimental agriculturalist and president, W. A. Burpee Seed Company
- Samuel Butler, lawyer
- George H. Cannon, first U.S. Marine to be awarded the Medal of Honor in WWII
- Quico Canseco, U.S. representative (R-TX)
- Enrico Caruso Jr., actor, singer, son of renowned operatic tenor Enrico Caruso
- Sam Cohn, talent agent
- Elgin English Crull, city manager of Dallas, Texas at time of JFK assassination
- Joseph T. Curry, member of the Louisiana House of Representatives 1930–1944; planter in Tensas Parish
- Luther Davis, playwright and screenwriter
- Kevin Dean, NHL hockey player
- Vadhir Derbez, actor and singer
- Jonathan Dever, member of Ohio House of Representatives
- Mario Domínguez, Champ Car driver
- Nic Dowd, NHL hockey player
- Jack Eckerd, founder of Eckerd Pharmacy
- Molly Engstrom, hockey player for Team USA
- Eugene C. Eppley, hotel magnate
- Reuben H. Fleet, founder of Consolidated Aircraft, aviation pioneer
- George Foreman III, professional boxer
- Ernest K. Gann, aviator and writer
- Blake Geoffrion, hockey player
- Horace Heidt, pianist and big-band leader
- James A. Henderson, chairman of Cummins, Inc.
- Mitch Henderson, college basketball head coach
- Elwood Hillis, US House of Representatives, grandson of Elwood Haynes
- Hal Holbrook, actor
- Tim Holt, actor
- Robert J. Huber, Michigan politician and businessman
- Michael Huffington, U.S. congressman from California and film producer
- Lamar Hunt, founder of NFL's Kansas City Chiefs
- Jonas Ingram, naval admiral and recipient of the Medal of Honor
- Brennan Kapcheck, professional hockey player
- Bill Koch, businessman, sailor, and collector; his boat won America's Cup in 1992
- Gabe Laidig, Aviator
- Russell Lee, photographer and photojournalist, best known for work for Farm Security Administration (FSA)
- John-Michael Liles, NHL hockey player and 2006 Olympian
- Joshua Logan, playwright, screenwriter and stage/film director
- Mason Lohrei, NHL hockey player
- Daniel Manion, judge
- George Mastics, member of Ohio House of Representatives, former county commissioner in Palm Beach, Florida
- Adolphe Menjou, actor
- Emilio Azcárraga Milmo, American-Mexican businessman and publisher
- Kayla Miracle, wrestler
- Charles I. Murray, brigadier general, USMC, recipient of Navy Cross and Army Distinguished Service Cross
- Edmund H. North, Oscar-winning screenwriter
- Walter O'Malley (1903–1979), owner of baseball's Brooklyn Dodgers, who moved team to Los Angeles, California in 1958
- Richard O'Neill, writer
- Stephen A. Orthwein, polo player
- Eugene Pallette, actor
- Roger Penske, owner of Penske Corporation
- William Perry, United States secretary of defense
- Barry Richter, NHL hockey player
- John Rickert, real estate investor, owner, RICORE|Lee & Associates, Cincinnati, Ohio
- George R. Roberts, financier, partner in KKR
- Mark Salling, actor, musician, played "Puck" on TV show Glee
- Jon Scieszka, author
- Gene Siskel, film critic
- Tal Smith, Major League Baseball executive, retired president of Houston Astros, marathon runner
- Herbert Sobel, lieutenant colonel, U.S. Army, World War II veteran and first commander of Easy Company, 2nd battalion, 506th P.I.R. with 101st Airborne division, depicted in Band of Brothers
- Juergen Sommer, professional soccer player and coach
- Lewis M. Steel, civil rights attorney
- Burr Steers, actor and director
- George Steinbrenner, owner of New York Yankees
- Hal Steinbrenner, part-owner of New York Yankees
- Dan Sullivan, U.S. senator for Alaska
- Gary Suter, NHL hockey player
- Ryan Suter, hockey player, NHL and Team USA
- Jorge Alberto Uribe, Colombian politician, diplomat and businessman
- Miles D. White, chairman and CEO, Abbott Labs
- Kingsley Wilson, DOW Press Secretary
- James C. Wofford, Olympic equestrian
- John W. Woodmansee, US Army officer and recipient of the Silver Star
- Robert R. Young, financier
- Jay Zeamer, Jr., Medal of Honor recipient, U.S. Army Air Force of World War II

== Faculty ==
- Hillard Bell Huntington
- James Garesche Ord
- Bob Peck
- Charles DuVal Roberts
- William A. Roosma
- John Shirley Wood

== Fictional ==
- Tom Brown of Culver, movie character
