= Robert L. Carter =

American judge (1917–2012)

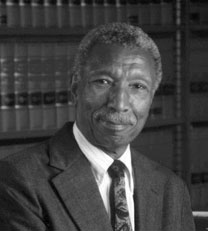

Senior Judge of the United States District Court for the Southern District of New York
- In office December 31, 1986 – January 3, 2012

Judge of the United States District Court for the Southern District of New York
- In office July 25, 1972 – December 31, 1986
- Appointed by: Richard Nixon
- Preceded by: Thomas Francis Croake
- Succeeded by: Kenneth Conboy

Personal details
- Born: Robert Lee Carter; March 11, 1917 Caryville, Florida
- Died: January 3, 2012 (aged 94) New York City, New York
- Education: Lincoln University (BA); Howard University (LLB); Columbia University (LLM)

Robert Lee Carter (March 11, 1917 – January 3, 2012) was an American lawyer, civil rights activist, who argued the Brown v. Board of Education case before the Supreme Court, and a United States district judge of the United States District Court for the Southern District of New York.

== Personal history and early life ==
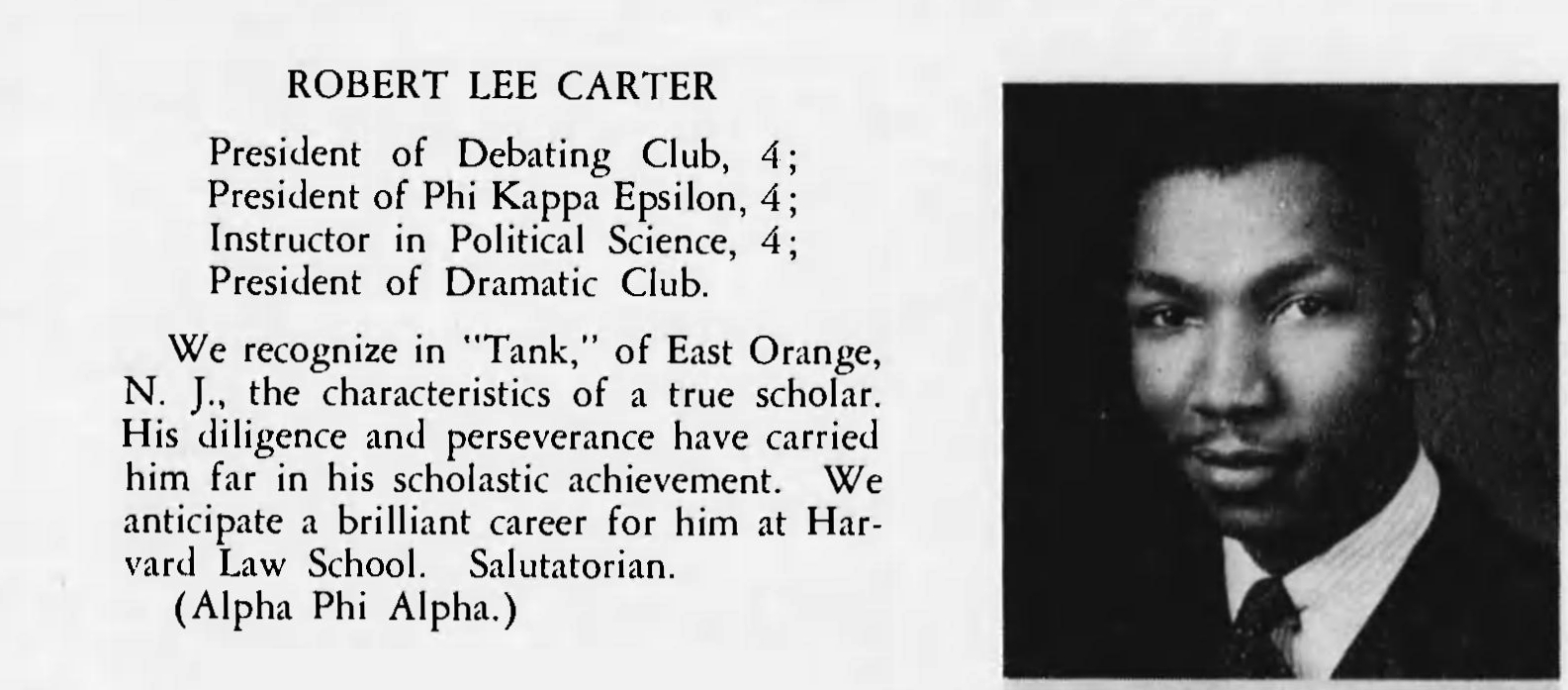
Carter in the Lincoln University yearbook, 1937

Carter was born on March 11, 1917, in Caryville, Florida. As part of the Great Migration of southern blacks moving north, his mother Annie Martin Carter took him, when he was six weeks old, and his siblings, to Newark, New Jersey, where his father, Robert L. Carter Sr., worked. However, his father died when he was a year old. Nonetheless, the family stayed in Newark, and his mother worked as a laundress to support her family, helped by her eldest daughter, who worked as a seamstress until marrying when Carter was 12. Carter began high school at Barringer High School in Newark.

The family moved to East Orange, New Jersey during Carter's high school years, where Carter's activism began after he read that a state court had ruled against racially discriminatory practices such as that high school's only allowing black students to use the swimming pool on Fridays, and entered the pool with white students, defying a teacher's threats. The school chose to close down its pool rather than integrate it. Carter graduated at age 16 from East Orange High School after having skipped two grades.

Carter earned an Artium Baccalaureus degree in political science from Lincoln University in Pennsylvania in 1937 and his Bachelor of Laws from Howard University School of Law in 1940, both on scholarship and from predominantly black institutions. Carter earned his Master of Laws from Columbia Law School in 1941 using the funds from a 1940 Rosenwald Fellowship, after writing an influential master's thesis that would later define the NAACP's legal strategy on the right to freedom of association under the First Amendment to the United States Constitution.

Carter joined the United States Army Air Corps a few months before the United States entered World War II. Experiences such as a white captain's welcoming him to the Augusta, Georgia station by telling him that they did not believe in educating black people, made Carter militant. Nonetheless, Carter completed Officer Candidate School and received a commission as lieutenant. As the only black officer at Harding Field in Baton Rouge, Louisiana, Carter integrated the officer's club, to the consternation of many. He then transferred to Columbus, Ohio, but continued to face hostility based on his race.

In 1946, Carter married Gloria Spencer (who died in 1971) and had two sons: John W. Carter, who became a justice of the New York Supreme Court in the Bronx, and David Carter.

== Civil rights advocate ==
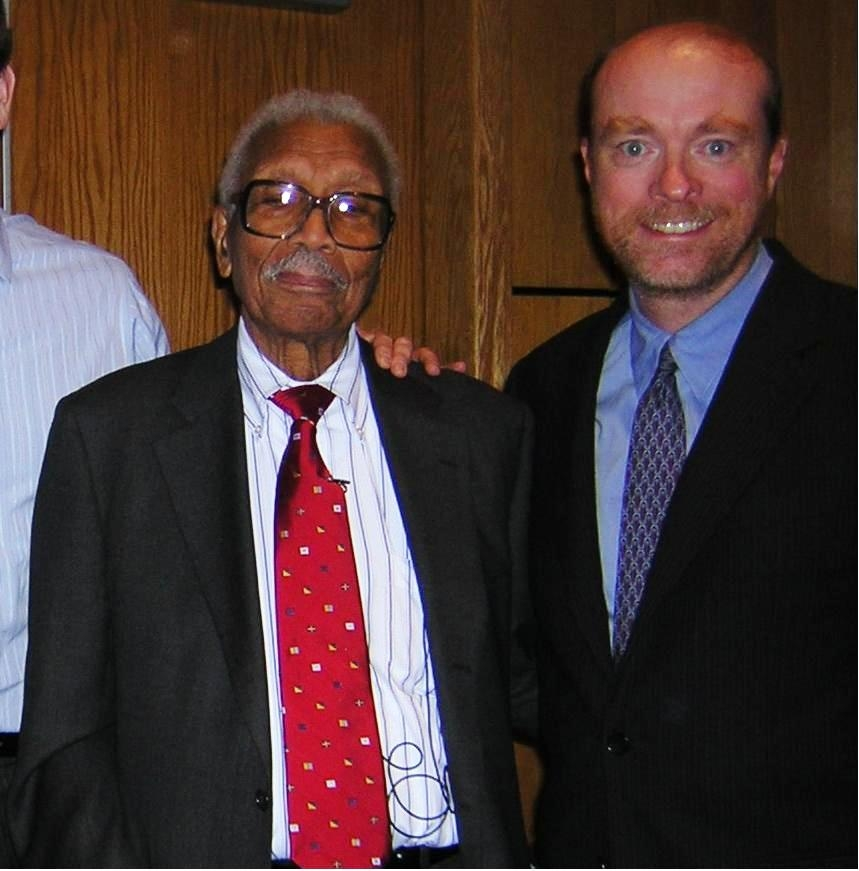
Carter being awarded honorary degree by Fordham Law School, dean William Treanor. November 2004

In 1944, as Carter's wartime service ended, he began working at the NAACP Legal Defense and Educational Fund ("LDF"), and the following year he became an assistant special counsel at the LDF. By 1948 Carter had become a legal assistant to Thurgood Marshall. He worked on a number of major school desegregation cases, including Sipuel v. Board of Regents of the University of Oklahoma (1948), Sweatt v. Painter (1950) and McLaurin v. Oklahoma State Regents (1950).

He was one of the chief strategists and fellow counsel arguing on behalf of Oliver Brown, the plaintiff in one of the five school desegregation cases consolidated into Brown v. Board of Education when it reached the U.S. Supreme Court. . Carter directed the legal research, coordinated the work of dozens of lawyers, and drafted much of the brief, undertaking the day-to-day responsibility for the entire project. He helped assemble the hundreds of experts and assistants who worked to collect the relevant materials and write the case position papers, among them other Rosenwald Fellows.

Carter advocated bringing in psychological research by Kenneth and Mamie Clark on the deleterious effects that segregated schools had upon minority students' learning and development, which the unanimous court later relied upon in overturning Plessy v. Ferguson and deeming public school segregation unconstitutional. He subsequently worked on Griffin v. County School Board of Prince Edward County, challenging a Virginia school board's attempt to avoid the desegregation required by Brown.

In 1956, after the separation of LDF from the NAACP, Carter succeeded Thurgood Marshall as the general counsel of the NAACP. He argued and won NAACP v. Alabama (1958), which blocked Alabama's attempts to gather NAACP membership lists, and Gomillion v. Lightfoot (1960), which found that Alabama's racial gerrymandering of an electoral district in Tuskegee violated the 15th Amendment. However, he was disappointed in 1961 when Marshall chose Jack Greenberg, a white attorney, as his successor as LDF's President and Director-Counsel over him. Nonetheless, Carter argued and won NAACP v. Button (1963), in which the Supreme Court struck down a Virginia statute restricting public interest litigation. Like NAACP v. Alabama, the Button decision eliminated a tool of massive resistance employed by some Southern states in response to Brown, and applied the First Amendment theories Carter began developing as a student at Columbia Law School. In all, while working for the NAACP and LDF, Carter argued 22 cases before the Supreme Court, winning 21 of them.

=== Civic and legal involvement ===
Carter was a member of Alpha Phi Alpha fraternity, and a co-founder of the National Conference of Black Lawyers. He served as a member of numerous bar and court-appointed committees, and was associated with a very wide array of educational institutions, organizations and foundations.

=== Resignation from NAACP ===
In 1968, Carter, along with his entire legal staff, resigned in protest from the NAACP after the organization fired attorney Lewis M. Steel for criticizing the Supreme Court in a The New York Times Magazine piece. Carter believed that the NAACP board fired Steel because it felt the legal department was taking on cases that were too controversial. Carter then worked at Columbia University's Urban Center, and joined the New York law firm of Poletti, Freidin, Prashker, Feldman & Gartner.

== Judicial career ==
On June 15, 1972, upon the recommendation of United States Senator Jacob Javits, President Richard Nixon nominated Carter to a seat on the United States District Court for the Southern District of New York vacated by Judge Thomas Francis Croake. The United States Senate confirmed Carter on July 21, 1972, and he received his commission on July 25, 1972. He assumed senior status on December 31, 1986, and continued serving in that capacity until his death on January 3, 2012.

=== Notable cases ===
As a judge, Carter handled litigation concerning the merger of the National Basketball Association and the American Basketball Association, as well as settled a basketball antitrust lawsuit and presided over several cases involving basketball stars. Carter also handled cases involving discrimination against black and Hispanic applicants to the New York City police force.

== Later life and legacy ==
Carter wrote numerous law review articles and essays on civil rights and discrimination in the United States, often focusing on school segregation; he also wrote about his longtime friends and colleagues Thurgood Marshall and Charles Hamilton Houston. In 2004, the NAACP awarded Carter its Spingarn Medal. In November of the same year, Fordham University School of Law awarded Carter an honorary Doctor of Laws degree recognizing his civil rights achievements. In 2005, Carter published a memoir of his experience as a civil rights advocate, A Matter of Law, with a preface by historian John Hope Franklin. In 2010, Patricia Sullivan interviewed Carter as part of the Civil Rights History project. His papers are at the Library of Congress.

=== Death ===
Carter died in a Manhattan hospital on January 3, 2012, of complications of a stroke, and was survived by both sons, a grandchild, and his sister Alma Carter Lawson.

== See also ==
- List of African-American federal judges
- List of African-American jurists

Legal offices
Preceded by Thomas Francis Croake	Judge of the United States District Court for the Southern District of New York; 1972–1986	Succeeded by Kenneth Conboy
