= List of landmark African-American legislation =

This is a list of landmark legislation, court decisions, executive orders, and proclamations in the United States significantly affecting African Americans.

== Congressional Legislation ==
=== Bills not passed ===
- Land Ordinance of 1784: Prohibited slavery in any new states after the year 1800. Omitted in final version of the bill
- Wilmot Proviso (1847) - sought to prohibit slavery in the territory acquired in the Mexican-American War.
- Lodge Fair Elections bill (1890) - proposal to empower the federal government to ensure fair elections. Failed after the Republican Party dropped support for it in exchange for the South's support of the McKinley Tariff and the Sherman Silver Purchase Act.
- Dyer Anti-Lynching Bill (1921) - sought to codify lynching as a federal crime. Defeated after a Senate filibuster by Southern Democrats.
- Costigan-Wagner antilynching bill (1934)
- Gavagan-Fish antilynching bill (1940)
- Civil Rights Act of 1990 - sought to ease requirements for plaintiffs in civil rights litigation. Passed by Congress but vetoed by President George H.W. Bush.
- Commission to Study and Develop Reparation Proposals for African-Americans Act (2021–22), a proposed act to investigate potential reparations for slavery in the United States, introduced as H.R. 40
- George Floyd Justice In Policing Act (2020–21) - sought to combat police misconduct, excessive force, and racial bias in American policing after murders of George Floyd and Rayshard Brooks.

=== Bills signed into law ===
- Slave Codes (1685–1865) - Series of laws limiting legal rights of slaves. Included establishment of slave patrols, limitations on freedom of movement, anti-literacy regulation, restrictions on commerce, and punishments for other infractions.
  - South Carolina slave codes (1685) - modeled on slave codes in Barbados and Jamaica.
  - Virginia Slave Codes of 1705
  - New York slave codes (1702)
- Ordinance of 1787: The Northwest Territorial Government ("Northwest Ordinance") - Prohibited slavery in the Northwest Territory north of the Ohio River.
- Fugitive Slave Law of 1793 - Guaranteed rights of slaveholders to retrieve escaped slaves.
- An Act to prohibit the importation of slaves 1807 - legally prohibited the international slave trade.
- Missouri Compromise (1820) - prohibited slavery north of parallel 36°30′ north, with the exception of Missouri, but allowed its continuation in the South. Resulted in the sectional factionalism between slave states and free states which lead to the American Civil War and the continuation of slavery in the South.
- Compromise of 1850 (1850) – Series of Congressional legislative measures addressing slavery and the boundaries of territories acquired during the Mexican–American War (1846–1848).
  - Fugitive Slave Law of 1850 – Made any federal marshal or other official who did not arrest an alleged runaway slave liable to a fine of $1,000
- Kansas–Nebraska Act (1854) - Allowed residents of Kansas and Nebraska to determine whether to abolish or adopt slavery based on "popular sovereignty"
- Act Prohibiting the Return of Slaves (1862) - prohibited the U.S. Armed Forces from returning escaped slaves to their former masters.
- Enrollment Act (1863) – Established conscription for the Union Army. Resulted in Draft Riots in several American cities, most famously New York City. Noted for the devastating loss of life and property among African-Americans in New York City.
- Black Codes (1865–66) - series of laws passed by Southern state legislatures restricting the political franchise and economic opportunity of free blacks, with heavy legal penalties for vagrancy and restrictive employment contracts.
- Civil Rights Act of 1866 – Declared that all persons born in the United States were now citizens, without regard to race, color, or previous condition
- Bureau of Refugees, Freedmen and Abandoned Lands (1866) - established organization to provide relief and employment to freed African-Americans.
- Reconstruction Act – A series of four acts provided for the division of all former Confederate states into five military districts; Each district would be headed by a military commander, who was charged with ensuring that the states would create new constitutions and ratify the
- Southern Homestead Act of 1866
- Naturalization Act of 1870 – Allowed persons of African descent to become citizens of the United States
- Enforcement Act of 1870 – enacted 31 May 1870, empowered the President of the United States to enforce the 15th Amendment
- Enforcement Act of 1871 – enacted February 1871
- Enforcement Act of 1871 Also known as the Ku Klux Klan Force Act. It was the third enforcement act passed by Congress. The act gave the President the power to suspend the writ of habeas corpus to combat the Ku Klux Klan and other white terrorist organizations during the Reconstruction Era.
- Amnesty Act (1872) - removed voting and office-holding restrictions from former supporters of the Confederacy and Confederate Army veterans.
- Civil Rights Act of 1875 - mandated equal treatment in public accommodations and public transportation, and prohibited exclusion from jury service.
- Posse Comitatus Act (1878) - limited the authority of the federal government to use the U.S. Army to enforce domestic policy. Ended the military occupation of the former Confederacy and the Reconstruction Era.
- Morrill Land Grant Colleges Act (1890) – Required each state to show that race was not an admissions criterion, or else to designate a separate land-grant institution for persons of color. Among the seventy colleges and universities which eventually evolved from the Morrill Acts are several of today's historically black colleges and universities
- Racial Integrity Act of 1924 - prohibited interracial marriage in Virginia and codified the "one-drop rule."
- Civil Rights Act of 1957 - Established the United States Commission on Civil Rights.
- Civil Rights Act of 1960 - Established federal oversight of voter registration.
- Civil Rights Act of 1964 - Guaranteed equal voter registration requirements and prohibited discrimination in employment, public accommodations, and education.
- Economic Opportunity Act of 1964 - Part of President Lyndon B. Johnson's War on Poverty initiative.
- Voting Rights Act of 1965 - Guaranteed voting rights for ethnic minorities and abolished restrictive measures such as literacy tests.
- Civil Rights Act of 1968 - Prohibited discrimination in housing.
- The Equal Employment Opportunity Act of 1972 - gave the Equal Employment Opportunity Commission (EEOC) authority to sue in federal courts when it finds reasonable cause to believe that there has been employment discrimination based on race, color, religion, sex, or national origin.
- Equal Credit Opportunity Act (1974) - Prohibited discrimination by creditors against applicants on the basis of race with respect to any aspect of a credit transaction
- Community Reinvestment Act (1977) - limited redlining
- Civil Rights Act of 1982 - Established uniform procedures for the enforcement by the Federal Government of civil rights laws.
- Civil Rights Restoration Act of 1987 - mandated that all recipients of federal funds must comply with civil rights
- Civil Rights Act of 1991 - Provided right to trial by jury in employment discrimination lawsuits.
- Violent Crime Control and Law Enforcement Act (1995) - requires the U.S. Sentencing Commission to increase penalties for hate crimes.
- Emmett Till Unsolved Civil Rights Crime Act (2007) - allows criminal cases of violent crimes committed against African Americans before 1970 to be reopened
- Matthew Shepard and James Byrd Jr. Hate Crimes Prevention Act (2009) - allows federal authorities, including the Federal Bureau of Investigation, to investigate and prosecute hate crimes.
- Emmett Till Antilynching Act (2022) - explicitly designates lynching as a federal crime. Named in honor of lynching victim Emmett Till.

== U.S. Constitution ==
=== Constitutional Clauses ===
- Article I, Section 2, Clause 3: Declared that slaves be counted as three-fifths of a person in the U.S. Census for the apportionment of members to the U.S. House of Representatives. Reached as a compromise between the Northern free states and the Southern slave states.
- Article I, Section 9, Clause 1: Prohibited Congress from prohibiting the international slave trade before the year 1808.
- Article IV, Section 2, Clause 3: Mandated that runaway slaves must be extradited to their state of origin.

=== Ratified Amendments ===
- Thirteenth Amendment (1865) - abolished Slavery in the United States.
- Fourteenth Amendment (1868) - extended U.S. citizenship to all natural-born residents, including African-Americans; guaranteed due process to all U.S. citizens; and temporarily barred former supporters of the Confederacy from holding public office.
- Fifteenth Amendment (1870) - guaranteed voting rights to all male U.S. citizens, including African-Americans.
- Nineteenth Amendment (1920) - guaranteed women's suffrage, including to African-American women.
- Twenty-fourth Amendment (1964) - abolished the poll tax in federal elections.

=== Unratified or Proposed Amendments ===
- Crittenden Compromise (1861) - Proposal to avert the American Civil War by amending the U.S. Constitution to explicitly legalize slavery in the American South and prohibit its abolition. Rejected by Congress and President Abraham Lincoln.
- Corwin Amendment (1861) - proposed to prohibit the federal government and future constitutional amendments from interfering with the "domestic institutions" of individual states, implicitly including slavery. Endorsed and signed by President James Buchanan but not ratified before the Civil War

== Federal court decisions ==
=== Decisions ===
- North Carolina v. Mann (1830) - Ruled that slaveholders had absolute authority over slaves, including to commit acts of violence against them.
- Prigg v. Pennsylvania (1842) - Overturned Pennsylvania state law prohibiting free blacks from being forcibly taken to the South and enslaved.
- Dred Scott v. Sandford (1857) - Effectively overturned the Missouri Compromise prohibiting slavery in the North and ruled that African-Americans were not U.S. citizens.
- Slaughterhouse Cases (1873) - Limited enforcement of the Privileges and Immunities Clause.
- United States v. Cruikshank (1876) - Ruled that the Bill of Rights did not apply to state governments.
- United States v. Reese (1876) - Narrowed interpretation of the Fifteenth Amendment.
- Strauder v. West Virginia (1880) - Limited enforcement of the Civil Rights Act of 1866.
- Plessy v. Ferguson (1896) - Ruled racial segregation and Jim Crow laws in the South to be constitutional under the "separate-but-equal" doctrine.
- Williams v. Mississippi (1898) - Upheld voting restrictions in the 1890 Mississippi State Constitution.
- Cumming v. Richmond County Board of Education (1899) - Upheld de jure segregation in schools.
- Guinn v. United States (1915) - Ruled certain grandfather clause provisions in Southern states to be unconstitutional.
- Nixon v. Herndon (1927) - Ruled all-white primary elections of the Texas Democratic Party to be unconstitutional.
- Nixon v. Condon (1932) - Ruled reformulated all-white primary elections of the Texas Democratic Party to be unconstitutional.
- Powell v. Alabama (1932) - Reversed verdict for the Scottsboro Boys. First overturning of state criminal conviction for violation of criminal procedural provisions.
- Grovey v. Townsend (1935) - Ruled reformulated all-white primary elections of the Texas Democratic Party to be unconstitutional.
- Breedlove v. Suttles (1937) - Upheld the poll tax.
- Gaines v. Canada (1938) - Ruled that states providing public education must provide educational opportunities to blacks.
- New Negro Alliance v. Sanitary Grocery Co. (1938) - Ruled in favor of the right to boycott during an African-American boycott of Safeway Inc. over discriminatory hiring practices.
- Lane v. Wilson (1939) - Overturned restrictive voter registration procedures of Oklahoma.
- Chambers v. Florida (1940) - Ruled that confessions gained under police pressure violate the Due Process Clause.
- Smith v. Allwright (1944) - Decisively prohibited all-white primary elections.
- Shelley v. Kraemer (1948) - Overturned housing covenants prohibiting occupation by ethnic minorities.
- McLaurin v. Oklahoma State Regents (overturned low court decision by same name) (1950) - ruled against segregation at public universities.
- Sweatt v. Painter (1950) - challenged the "separate but equal" doctrine.
- Henderson v. United States (1950) - abolished segregation in dining cars.
- Brown v. Board of Education - composed of four cases arising from states and a related federal case arising from the District of Columbia overturning segregation in schools and the separate-but-equal doctrine.
  - Davis v. County School Board of Prince Edward County (1951) - the case arising from Virginia
  - Briggs v. Elliott (1952) - the case arising from South Carolina
  - Gebhart v. Belton (1952) - the case arising from Delaware
  - Brown v. Board of Education of Topeka (1954) - the case arising from Kansas
  - Bolling v. Sharpe (1954) - a related case arising from Washington, D.C.
- Lucy v. Adams (1955) - desegregated the University of Alabama
- Keys v. Carolina Coach Co. - ruled that the Interstate Commerce Act of 1887 prohibited segregation on interstate buses
- NAACP v. Alabama (1958) - Barred the State of Alabama from subpoenaing NAACP records and membership rolls.
- Gomillion v. Lightfoot (1960) - ruled that the creation of electoral districts in Tuskegee, Alabama was gerrymandering in violation of the Fifteenth Amendment.
- Boynton v. Virginia (1960) - ruled that segregation of public transportation was illegal under the Interstate Commerce Act of 1887.
- Baker v. Carr (1962) - ruled that redistricting was a justiciabile question in federal court.
- Heart of Atlanta Motel v. United States (1964) - upheld Title II of the Civil Rights Act of 1964 under the Commerce Clause.
- McLaughlin v. Florida (1964) - overturned Florida's ban on interracial cohabitation.
- New York Times Co. v. Sullivan (1964) - ruled that the First Amendment protections on freedom of speech restricted defamation lawsuits to cases of "actual malice." Originated with a lawsuit against The New York Times for a full-page ad criticizing the Montgomery Police Department for mistreating civil rights protesters.
- Harper v. Virginia State Board of Elections (1966) - abolished the poll tax in state elections.
- South Carolina v. Katzenbach (1966)
- Loving v. Virginia (1967) - ruled anti-miscegenation laws to be unconstitutional
- Jones v. Mayer (1968) - Held that Congress could regulate the sale of private property in order to prevent racial discrimination, upholding the Fair Housing Act of 1968
- Green v. School Board of New Kent County (1968) - ruled against Freedom of Choice plans in desegregating schools.
- Swann v. Charlotte-Mecklenburg Board of Education (1971) - upheld desegregation busing
- Gates v. Collier (1974) - abolished the trusty system and ended inmate abuse at Mississippi State Penitentiary, a prison notorious for its incarceration of civil rights activists
- Milliken v. Bradley (1974) - ruled that school districts were not responsible for desegregation across district lines
- Regents of the University of California v. Bakke (1978) - overturned affirmative action programs using quotas.
- Harris v. Harvey (1979) - held that public defamation motivated by racial prejudice is not protected by judicial immunity
- Batson v. Kentucky (1986) - held that prosecutors may not use peremptory challenges to expel jurors based on race.
- McCleskey v. Kemp (1987) - ruled that a scientific study demonstrating that the death penalty had a racially-disproportionate impact could not mitigate a death sentence
- Shaw v. Reno (1993) - ruled that redistricting must be held to strict scrutiny under the Equal Protection Clause
- Adarand Constructors, Inc. v. Peña (1995) - ruled that affirmative action imposed by the federal government must pass strict scrutiny
- Grutter v. Bollinger (2003) - upheld affirmative action in college admissions.
- Shelby County v. Holder (2013) - overturned Sections 4(b) and 5 of the Voting Rights Act of 1965, limiting the law's enforcement.
- Schuette v. Coalition to Defend Affirmative Action (2014) - held that Proposal 2, an amendment to the Constitution of Michigan prohibiting affirmative action does not violate the Equal Protection Clause

== Executive Orders and Proclamations ==
- Emancipation Proclamation (1862) - Issued by President Abraham Lincoln. It declared that all slaves in Confederate territory still in rebellion were freed.
- Executive Order 8802 (1942) - Issued by President Franklin D. Roosevelt. It banned racial discrimination in government departments and defense industries. It also established Fair Employment Practice Committee directed to oversee compliance with the order.
- Executive Order 9908 (1946)
- Executive Order 9980 (1948)
- Executive Order 9981 (1948) - Issued by President Harry S. Truman. It desegregated the U.S. Armed Forces.
- Executive Order 10577 (1954)
- Executive Order 10590 (1955) - Issued by President Dwight D. Eisenhower. It established the President's Committee on Government Employment Policy. It aimed to eliminate discrimination in federal hiring.
- Executive Order 10925 (1961) - Issued by President John F. Kennedy. It established the President's Committee on Equal Employment Opportunity, which later became the Equal Employment Opportunity Commission, and requires equal opportunity in placement and promotion in the U.S. military.
- Executive Order 11063 (1962) - Issued by President John F. Kennedy. It banned segregation in federally funded housing.
- Executive Order 11114 (1963)
- Executive Order 11246 (1965) - Issued by President Lyndon B. Johnson. It prohibited discrimination in employment decisions on the basis of race, color, religion, sex, or national origin.
- Executive Order 11478 (1969) - Issued by President Richard M. Nixon. It prohibited discrimination on certain grounds in the competitive service of the federal civilian workforce, including the United States Postal Service and civilian employees of the United States Armed Forces.

== Federal bureaucracy ==
- Bureau of Refugees, Freedmen and Abandoned Lands (June 1865 through December 1868)
- Fair Employment Practice Committee (1941)
- President's Committee on Civil Rights (December 1946 through December 1947)
- Civil Rights Commission (created 1957)
- Civil Rights Division in the Department of Justice (created 1957)
- Equal Employment Opportunity Commission (created 1964)
- Head Start (created 1965)
- National Advisory Commission on Civil Disorders (created 1967)
- Office of Fair Housing and Equal Opportunity (created 1968)
- Minority Business Development Agency (1969)
- Office of Federal Contract Compliance Programs (1977)
- Office of Minority Health in the Department of Health and Human Services (1986)
- Office for Civil Rights in the Department of Education

== Important Organizations and Individuals ==
- Free African Union Society
- Free African Society
- American Anti-Slavery Society
- African Methodist Episcopal Church
- Colored Conventions Movement
- National Negro Business League
- National Association for the Advancement of Colored People
  - NAACP Legal Defense and Educational Fund
- National Council of Negro Women
- Universal Negro Improvement Association
- The Communist Party USA and African-Americans
- Civil Rights Congress
- Congressional Black Caucus
- Southern Conference Educational Fund
- Southern Christian Leadership Conference
- Congress of Racial Equality
- Student Nonviolent Coordinating Committee
- Mississippi Freedom Democratic Party
- Council of Federated Organizations
- Black Panther Party
- Nation of Islam
- Leadership Conference on Civil and Human Rights
- Black Lives Matter movement

== See also ==
- African American history
- Jim Crow Laws
- Civil rights movement (1896–1954)
- Civil Rights Movement
