= NAACP v. Alabama =

- Supreme Court of the United States

Argued January 15–16, 1958 Decided June 30, 1958
- Full case name: National Association for the Advancement of Colored People v. Alabama ex rel. Patterson, Attorney General
- Citations: 357 U.S. 449 (more) 78 S. Ct. 1163; 2 L. Ed. 2d 1488; 1958 U.S. LEXIS 1802

Case history
- Prior: Cert. to the Supreme Court of Alabama

Holding
- The freedom to associate with organizations dedicated to the "advancement of beliefs and ideas" is an inseparable part of the Due Process Clause of the Fourteenth Amendment.

Court membership
- Chief Justice Earl Warren Associate Justices Hugo Black · Felix Frankfurter; William O. Douglas · Harold H. Burton; Tom C. Clark · John M. Harlan II; William J. Brennan Jr. · Charles E. Whittaker

Case opinion
- Majority: Harlan, joined by unanimous

Laws applied
- U.S. Const. amend. XIV

National Association for the Advancement of Colored People v. Alabama, 357 U.S. 449 (1958), is a landmark decision of the US Supreme Court. Alabama sought to prevent the NAACP from conducting further business in the state. After the circuit court issued a restraining order, the state issued a subpoena for various records, including the NAACP's membership lists. The Supreme Court ruled unanimously that Alabama's demand for the lists violated the right of due process guaranteed by the Fourteenth Amendment to the United States Constitution.

== Background ==
In 1956, the Attorney General of Alabama, John Patterson, brought suit in the State Circuit Court of Montgomery, Alabama, challenging the National Association for the Advancement of Colored People (NAACP) for violation of a state statute requiring foreign corporations to qualify before doing business in the state. The NAACP, a nonprofit membership corporation based in New York, had not complied with the statute, as it believed it was exempt. The suit sought both to prevent the Association from conducting further business within the state and to remove it from the state.

Referring to the Association's involvement with the Montgomery bus boycott in 1955 and its role in funding and providing legal assistance to black students' seeking admission to the state university, the suit charged that the Association was "... causing irreparable injury to the property and civil rights of the residents and citizens of the State of Alabama for which criminal prosecution and civil actions at law afford no adequate relief ...." On the day the suit was filed, the circuit court agreed to issue an ex parte order restraining the Association from conducting business in the state or taking steps to qualify it to do so.

The Association, represented throughout by Robert L. Carter of the NAACP Legal Defense Fund, responded by moving to dissolve the order on the grounds that its activities within the state did not require its qualification under the statute and that the state's suit was intended to violate its rights to freedom of speech and of assembly as guaranteed by the Constitution of the United States. Before a hearing date was set, the state issued a subpoena for much of the Association's records, including bank statements and leases, but most notably the names and addresses of the "agents" or "members" of the Association in Alabama.

In its response to the lawsuit, the Association admitted that it was in breach of the statute and offered to obtain qualification to continue business if that part of the ex parte order was lifted. Because the Association did not comply with the order to produce its records, that motion was denied and the Association was held in contempt and fined $10,000. The contempt order allowed for the reduction or remission of the fine if the production order was complied with within five days, after which the fine would be raised to $100,000.

Contending that the State could not constitutionally force disclosure of the records, the Association moved to dismiss the contempt judgment once more. According to Alabama case law, however, a petitioner could not seek a hearing or to dissolve an order until it purged itself of contempt.

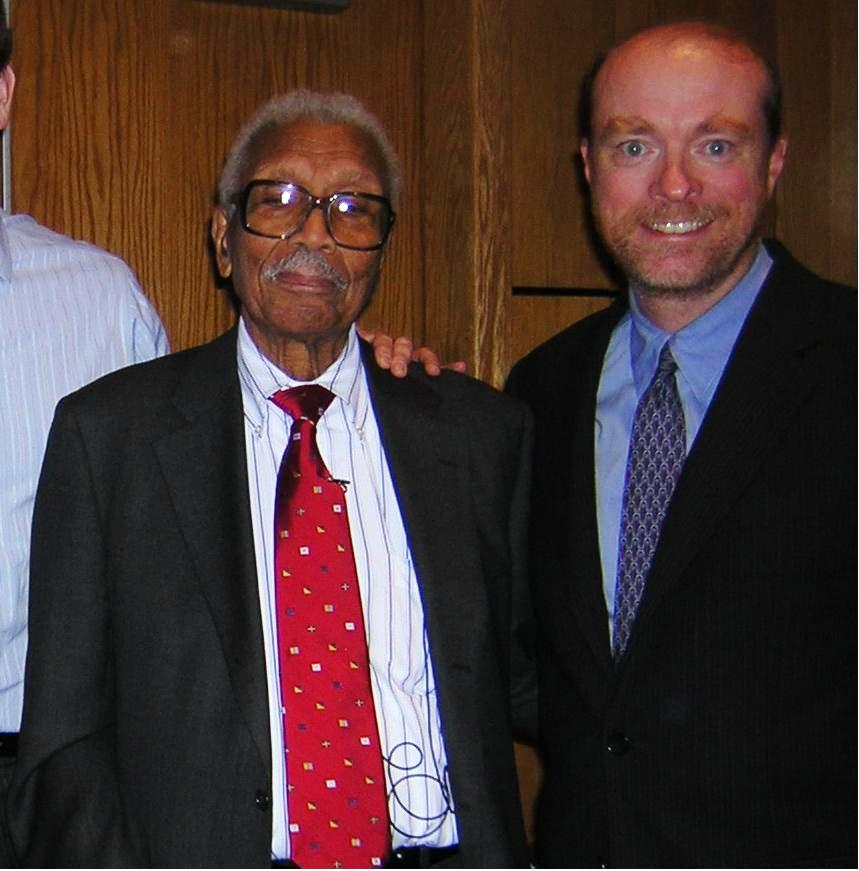
Lead attorney on NAACP v. Alabama, Judge Robert L. Carter (left), with the dean of Georgetown University Law Center, William Treanor

The United States Supreme Court reversed the first contempt judgment. The Alabama Supreme Court then claimed the U.S. Supreme Court had relied on a "mistaken premise" and reinstated the contempt judgment, which the U.S. Supreme Court reversed again. The NAACP moved to try the case on the merits; this motion was denied and again appealed up to the U.S. Supreme Court, which remanded the case to Alabama, and ordered the Federal district court to try the case on the merits if the Alabama court system continued to refuse to do so.

The Alabama state circuit court finally heard the case on the merits, and decided the NAACP had violated Alabama law and ordered it to stop doing business in the state; the Alabama appeals courts upheld this judgment, refusing to hear the NAACP's appeals on Constitutional grounds. Finally, the fourth time the case was heard by the U.S. Supreme Court, it granted certiorari and decided the case, itself, on the merits rather than remand the case to the balking Alabama court system, which had taken five years to get this far.

== Judgment ==
In an opinion delivered by Justice John Marshall Harlan II, the Supreme Court decided in favor of the petitioners, holding that "Immunity from state scrutiny of petitioner's membership lists is here so related to the right of petitioner's members to pursue their lawful private interests privately and to associate freely with others in doing so as to come within the protection of the Fourteenth Amendment" and, further, that freedom to associate with organizations dedicated to the "advancement of beliefs and ideas" is an inseparable part of the Due Process Clause of the Fourteenth Amendment. The action of the state's obtaining the names of the Association's membership would likely interfere with the free association of its members, so the state's interest in obtaining the records was superseded by the constitutional rights of the petitioners. Harlan said the following.

It is hardly a novel perception that compelled disclosure of affiliation with groups engaged in advocacy may constitute as effective a restraint on freedom of association as the forms of governmental action in the cases above were thought likely to produce upon the particular constitutional rights there involved. This Court has recognized the vital relationship between freedom to associate and privacy in one's associations. When referring to the varied forms of governmental action which might interfere with freedom of assembly, it said in American Communications Ass'n v. Douds, supra, 339 U.S. at page 402, 70 S.Ct. at page 686: "A requirement that adherents of particular religious faiths or political parties wear identifying arm-bands, for example, is obviously of this nature." Compelled disclosure of membership in an organization engaged in advocacy of particular beliefs is of the same order. Inviolability of privacy in group association may in many circumstances be indispensable to preservation of freedom of association, particularly where a group espouses dissident beliefs. Cf. United States v. Rumely, supra, 345 U.S. at pages 56 58, 73 S.Ct. at pages 550–551 (concurring opinion).

We think that the production order, in the respects here drawn in question, must be regarded as entailing the likelihood of a substantial restraint upon the exercise by petitioner's members of their right to freedom of association. Petitioner has made an uncontroverted showing that on past occasions revelation of the identity of its rank-and-file members has exposed these members to economic reprisal, loss of employment, threat of physical coercion, and other manifestations of public hostility. Under these circumstances, we think it apparent that compelled disclosure of petitioner's Alabama membership is likely to affect adversely the ability of petitioner and its members to pursue their collective effort to foster beliefs which they admittedly have the right to advocate, in that it may induce members to withdraw from the Association and dissuade others from joining it because of fear of exposure of their beliefs shown through their associations and of the consequences of this exposure.

It is not sufficient to answer, as the State does here, that whatever repressive effect compulsory disclosure of names of petitioner's members may have upon participation by Alabama citizens in petitioner's activities follows not from state action but from private community pressures. The crucial factor is the interplay of governmental and private action, for it is only after the initial exertion of state power represented by the production order that private action takes hold.

...

Whether there was 'justification' in this instance turns solely on the substantiality of Alabama's interest in obtaining the membership lists. During the course of a hearing before the Alabama Circuit Court on a motion of petitioner to set aside the production order, the State Attorney General presented at length, under examination by petitioner, the State's reason for requesting the membership lists. The exclusive purpose was to determine whether petitioner was conducting intrastate business in violation of the Alabama foreign corporation registration statute, and the membership lists were expected to help resolve this question. The issues in the litigation commenced by Alabama by its bill in equity were whether the character of petitioner and its activities in Alabama had been such as to make petitioner subject to the registration statute, and whether the extent of petitioner's activities without qualifying suggested its permanent ouster from the State. Without intimating the slightest view upon the merits of these issues, we are unable to perceive that the disclosure of the names of petitioner's rank-and-file members has a substantial bearing on either of them. As matters stand in the state court, petitioner (1) has admitted its presence and conduct of activities in Alabama since 1918; (2) has offered to comply in all respects with the state qualification statute, although preserving its contention that the statute does not apply to it; and (3) has apparently complied satisfactorily with the production order, except for the membership lists, by furnishing the Attorney General with varied business records, its charter and statement of purposes, the names of all of its directors and officers, and with the total number of its Alabama members and the amount of their dues. These last items would not on this record appear subject to constitutional challenge and have been furnished, but whatever interest the State may have in obtaining names of ordinary members has not been shown to be sufficient to overcome petitioner's constitutional objections to the production order.

From what has already been said, we think it apparent that People of State of New York ex rel. Bryant v. Zimmerman, 278 U.S. 63, 49 S.Ct. 61, 73 L.Ed. 184, cannot be relied on in support of the State's position, for that case involved markedly different considerations in terms of the interest of the State in obtaining disclosure. There, this Court upheld as applied to a member of a local chapter of the Ku Klux Klan, a New York statute requiring any unincorporated association which demanded an oath as a condition to membership to file with state officials copies of its '* * * constitution, by-laws, rules, regulations and oath of membership, together with a roster of its membership and a list of its officers for the current year.' N.Y. Laws 1923, c. 664, §§ 53, 56. In its opinion, the Court took care to emphasize the nature of the organization which New York sought to regulate. The decision was based on the particular character of the Klan's activities, involving acts of unlawful intimidation and violence, which the Court assumed was before the state legislature when it enacted the statute, and of which the Court itself took judicial notice. Furthermore, the situation before us is significantly different from that in Bryant, because the organization there had made no effort to comply with any of the requirements of New York's statute but rather had refused to furnish the State with any information as to its local activities.

We hold that the immunity from state scrutiny of membership lists which the Association claims on behalf of its members is here so related to the right of the members to pursue their lawful private interests privately and to associate freely with others in so doing as to come within the protection of the Fourteenth Amendment. And we conclude that Alabama has fallen short of showing a controlling justification for the deterrent effect on the free enjoyment of the right to associate which disclosure of membership lists is likely to have. Accordingly, the judgment of civil contempt and the $100,000 fine which resulted from petitioner's refusal to comply with the production order in this respect must fall.

== See also ==
- Freedom of association
  - Bates v. City of Little Rock (1960)
  - Talley v. California (1960)
  - Roberts v. United States Jaycees (1984)
  - Hurley v. Irish-American Gay, Lesbian, and Bisexual Group of Boston (1995)
  - Boy Scouts of America v. Dale (2000)
- Bruce Bennett, the Arkansas Attorney General sought in 1958 to impose limitations on the NAACP comparable to what had been done in Alabama.
- List of landmark African-American legislation
