= List of United States Supreme Court cases, volume 339 =

This is a list of all the United States Supreme Court cases from volume 339 of the United States Reports:

Case name	Citation	Date decided
District of Columbia v. Little	339 U.S. 1	1950
Solesbee v. Balkcom	339 U.S. 9	1950
Wong Yang Sung v. McGrath	339 U.S. 33	1950
United States v. Rabinowitz	339 U.S. 56	1950
United States v. Burnison	339 U.S. 87	1950
Affolder v. N.Y.C. & S.L.E.R.R. Co.	339 U.S. 96	1950
Hiatt v. Brown	339 U.S. 103	1950
Reider v. Thompson	339 U.S. 113	1950
United States v. Commodities Trading Corp.	339 U.S. 121	1950
Railway Labor Executives' Ass'n v. United States	339 U.S. 142	1950
Standard-Vacuum Oil Co. v. United States	339 U.S. 157	1950
Dennis v. United States	339 U.S. 162	1950
United States v. U.S. Smelting Refining & Mining Co.	339 U.S. 186	1950
Darr v. Burford	339 U.S. 200	1950
Slocum v. Delaware L. & W.R.R. Co.	339 U.S. 239	1950
Railway Conductors v. Southern R.R. Co.	339 U.S. 255	1950
Morford v. United States	339 U.S. 258	1950
United States v. Westinghouse Elec. & Mfg. Co.	339 U.S. 261	1950
South v. Peters	339 U.S. 276	1950
Cassell v. Texas	339 U.S. 282	1950
Mullane v. Central Hanover Bank & Tr. Co.	339 U.S. 306	1950
Shipman v. DuPre	339 U.S. 321	1950
United States v. Bryan	339 U.S. 323	1950
United States v. Fleischman	339 U.S. 349	1950
American Communications Ass'n v. Douds	339 U.S. 382	1950
Automobile Workers v. O'Brien	339 U.S. 454	1950
Hughes v. Superior Ct.	339 U.S. 460	1950
Teamsters v. Hanke	339 U.S. 470	1950
United States v. National Ass'n	339 U.S. 485	1950
Powell v. U.S. Cartridge Co.	339 U.S. 497	1950
Building Service Employees v. Gazzam	339 U.S. 532	1950
Capitol Greyhound Lines v. Brice	339 U.S. 542	1950
NLRB v. Mexia Textile Mills, Inc.	339 U.S. 563	1950
NLRB v. Pool Mfg. Co.	339 U.S. 577	1950
Brown Shoe Co. v. Commissioner	339 U.S. 583	1950
Ewing v. Mytinger & Casselberry, Inc.	339 U.S. 594	1950
Graver Tank & Mfg. Co. v. Linde Air Products Co.	339 U.S. 605	1950
Commissioner v. Korell	339 U.S. 619	1950
Sweatt v. Painter	339 U.S. 629	1950
McLaurin v. Oklahoma State Regents	339 U.S. 637	1950
Travelers Health Ass'n v. Virginia ex rel. State Corp. Comm'n	339 U.S. 643	1950
Quicksall v. Michigan	339 U.S. 660	1950
Skelly Oil Co. v. Phillips Petroleum Co.	339 U.S. 667	1950
Swift & Co. Packers v. Compania Colombiana Del Caribe, S.A.	339 U.S. 684	1950
United States v. Louisiana (1950)	339 U.S. 699	1950
United States v. Texas (1950)	339 U.S. 707	1950
United States v. Gerlach Live Stock Co.	339 U.S. 725	1950
Johnson v. Eisenträger	339 U.S. 763	1950
United States v. Kansas City Life Ins. Co.	339 U.S. 799	1950
Henderson v. United States (1950)	339 U.S. 816	1950
Automatic Radio Mfg. Co. v. Hazeltine Research, Inc.	339 U.S. 827	1950
Lyon v. Singer	339 U.S. 841	1950
Roberts v. N.D. Cal.	339 U.S. 844	1950
Osman v. Douds	339 U.S. 846	1950
