= Skelly Oil Co. v. Phillips Petroleum Co. =

- Supreme Court of the United States

Decided June 5, 1950
- Full case name: Skelly Oil Co. v. Phillips Petroleum Co.
- Citations: 339 U.S. 667 (more)

Holding
- For federal question jurisdiction to exist over a lawsuit seeking a declaratory judgment, the lawsuit must state a claim that raises a federal question.

Court membership
- Chief Justice Fred M. Vinson Associate Justices Hugo Black · Stanley F. Reed; Felix Frankfurter · William O. Douglas; Robert H. Jackson · Harold H. Burton; Tom C. Clark · Sherman Minton

Case opinions
- Majority: Frankfurter
- Concur/dissent: Vinson, joined by Burton
- Dissent: Black
- Douglas took no part in the consideration or decision of the case.

Skelly Oil Co. v. Phillips Petroleum Co., 339 U.S. 667 (1950), was a United States Supreme Court case in which the court held that for federal question jurisdiction to exist over a lawsuit seeking a declaratory judgment, the lawsuit must state a claim that raises a federal question.

== Background ==
Phillips Petroleum Company had contracts with three producers to purchase gas for resale to a pipeline company which had applied to the Federal Power Commission for a certificate of public convenience and necessity under the Natural Gas Act. Each contract provided for termination by the producer upon notice to the respondent at any time after December 1, 1946, "but before the issuance of such certificate." On November 30, 1946, the Commission ordered that a certificate of public convenience and necessity be issued to the pipeline company, upon specified terms and conditions. The order was not made public until December 2, 1946, on which day the producers severally notified respondent of the termination of their contracts. Alleging that a certificate of public convenience and necessity, "within the meaning of said Natural Gas Act and said contracts," had been issued prior to the attempt to terminate the contracts, Phillips sued the three producers in the federal District Court under the Declaratory Judgment Act for a declaration that the contracts were still "in effect and binding upon the parties thereto." The decree of the District Court that the contracts had not been effectively terminated, and were still in full force and effect, was affirmed by the Tenth Circuit Court of Appeals.

== Opinion of the court ==
The Supreme Court issued an opinion on June 5, 1950. The court reversed and dismissed the case. The court said that the Declaratory Judgment Act enlarged the range of remedies available in the federal courts but did not extend their jurisdiction.

Justice Hugo Black dissented, merely saying he agreed with the Tenth Circuit.
