= Charles T. McCormick =

American university professor (1889–1963)

- Born: June 29, 1889; Dallas, Texas, U.S.
- Died: December 22, 1963 (aged 74); Austin, Texas, U.S.
- Occupations: Professor, Dean

Academic background
- Education: University of Texas, Austin (BA); Harvard University (LLB)

Charles Tilford McCormick (29 June 1889 – 22 December 1963) was an American university professor.

== Early life and education ==
McCormick was born in Dallas, Texas, in 1889. He studied at the University of Texas at Austin, graduating in 1909. He received a law degree from Harvard Law School in 1912. At Texas, he became a brother of the Phi Delta Theta social fraternity.

== Teaching career ==
McCormick was a professor in the School of Law at the Austin campus of University of Texas (1922–1926 and 1940–1963). During his second tenure there he also served as Dean of the College from 1940 to 1949.

He was a professor in the School of Law at the University of North Carolina (1926–1931) and Northwestern University (1931–1940). He was Dean of the University of North Carolina's School of Law from 1927 to 1931.

== Legacy ==
During his tenure as dean, McCormick led the UT Law School through the difficult war years, won approval for a new building, and is widely credited for his efforts to improve the curriculum, the faculty, and the school's national reputation. He was an authority on evidence, damages, and federal court procedure, and published extensively in those areas.

In early 1950s, McCormick became involved in the civil rights movement because of several activists' attempts to attain entrance to the then-all-white university law school. McCormick actively resisted integrating the law school and sought to continue segregation. The university's response to Sweatt v. Painter was to create a colored section of the Law School, with McCormick as Dean.

== Writings and committee service ==
McCormick authored the 1935 classic, Handbook on the Law of Damages, which continues to be cited in legal opinions as authority. His Handbook on the Law of Evidence remains in print (now edited by a group of professors) and is a standard resource for lawyers and law students.

He was a member of the American Law Institute, the Philosophical Society of Texas, and served as president of the Association of American Law Schools.

== Death ==
McCormick died at Austin, Texas on 22 December 1963 at age 74, while still on the university staff. He left his voluminous papers to the University libraries.
