= Barbara S. Jones =

American judge (born 1947)

Barbara Jones

Senior Judge of the United States District Court for the Southern District of New York
- In office December 31, 2012 – January 4, 2013

Judge of the United States District Court for the Southern District of New York
- In office December 26, 1995 – December 31, 2012
- Appointed by: Bill Clinton
- Preceded by: Kenneth Conboy
- Succeeded by: Gregory H. Woods

Personal details
- Born: Barbara Sue Jones; December 31, 1947 (age 77); Inglewood, California, U.S.
- Education: Mount Saint Mary's University, Los Angeles (BA); Temple University (JD)

Barbara Sue Jones (born December 31, 1947) is a former United States district judge of the United States District Court for the Southern District of New York. She has been the monitor of the Trump Organization for the New York state courts since 2022; since the February 16, 2024, decision barring Donald Trump and his sons from running the company, she has "total oversight of the real-estate conglomerate".

== Education and career ==
Born in Inglewood, California, Jones received a Bachelor of Arts degree from Mount St. Mary's University in 1968 and a Juris Doctor from the Temple University Beasley School of Law in 1973. Following law school graduation, Jones was a special attorney of the Organized Crime & Racketeering, Criminal Division of the United States Department of Justice in 1973, and of that agency's Manhattan Strike Force Against Organized Crime and Racketeering from 1973 to 1977. She was an Assistant United States Attorney in the Southern District of New York from 1977 to 1987, serving as chief of the General Crimes Unit from 1983 to 1984 and of the Organized Crime Unit from 1984 to 1987. From 1987 to 1995, she was a First assistant district attorney of New York County District Attorney's Office. Jones also taught as an adjunct associate professor of law at Fordham Law School from 1985 to 1995 and at New York University School of Law in 2008. Since 2009, Jones has taught trial advocacy at the Practicing Law Institute (PLI) in New York.

== Federal judicial service ==
On the recommendation of Senator Daniel Patrick Moynihan, Jones was nominated to the United States District Court for the Southern District of New York by President Bill Clinton on October 18, 1995 to a seat vacated by Judge Kenneth Conboy. She was confirmed by the United States Senate on December 22, 1995, and received commission on December 26, 1995. Jones assumed senior status on December 31, 2012, and subsequently retired from the court on January 4, 2013 to go into private practice. She now works on white collar and financial fraud cases as a partner in the New York office of Bracewell LLP.

=== Notable cases ===
In February 2003, Jones affirmed the decision by the New York Police Department (NYPD) not to issue permits to organizers of a planned mass march past the United Nations building in protest of the U.S. run-up to the Iraq War. The ruling upheld the NYPD's decision to allow only a "stationary rally" near the United Nations headquarters, a decision that authorized the NYPD to block thousands of demonstrators from making their way in small groups to the 49th Street and 1st Avenue rally on the morning of February 15, 2003. Donna Lieberman, the executive director of the New York City Civil Liberties Union marked the denial of permit as an unprecedented refusal of the protesters' constitutional right of assembly. In her testimony to the New York City Council Committee on Government Operations, Lieberman noted the instances of police violence and the civil rights violations that took place in the NYPD's enforcement of the denial-of-permit decision upheld by Jones.

Jones presided over Edith Windsor's suit against the United States, United States v. Windsor, challenging the constitutionality of the Defense of Marriage Act, or DOMA. Windsor had married her same-sex partner, Thea Spyer, in Canada in 2007, and the couple lived in New York, which recognized same-sex marriages performed in other jurisdictions. When Spyer died in 2009, Windsor owed over $363,000 in federal estate taxes, which she would not have had to pay had her spouse been of the opposite sex. In her lawsuit seeking a refund of the tax payment, Windsor asserted that Section 3 of DOMA, which defines marriage under federal law as solely the union of one man and one woman, violated the constitutional guarantee of equal protection of the laws. Judge Jones agreed and granted summary judgment in favor of Windsor. The United States appealed, and the Second Circuit affirmed Judge Jones's ruling. In a 5–4 decision issued on June 26, 2013, the Supreme Court struck down section 3 of DOMA (codified at 1 U.S.C. § 7) "as a deprivation of the equal liberty of persons that is protected by the Fifth Amendment."

Jones served as arbitrator in the NFL case against former RB Ray Rice. Rice received a 2-game suspension after a domestic violence incident left his then-girlfriend unconscious in the elevator after he struck her. Rice admitted to the NFL that he had struck her and that she had been knocked out. Months later, a video of the incident was released. Commissioner Goodell subsequently suspended Rice indefinitely, stating that the video showed a much more violent incident than Rice had led them to believe. Rice appealed, and won after Mrs. Jones found no evidence that Rice misled the NFL. Jones determined Goodell's indefinite suspension to be "capricious" and "arbitrary" because he was essentially suspending Rice for the same incident twice. Jones's ruling echoed much of the public sentiment to Goodell, as many media outlets hounded Goodell, asking, "did you really need to see the video to know that hitting a woman is violent?" Jones's ruling was only that a player cannot be disciplined for the same incident twice, a rule akin to not allowing double jeopardy in the US criminal system.

Jones was appointed in April 2018, to serve as a special master in the Michael Cohen case. In December 2021, she was named special master for a case involving FBI searches of the homes of Project Veritas employees relating to theft of the diary of Ashley Biden, daughter of then-president Joe Biden. In September 2022, she was one of two candidates proposed by the government as a special master to review documents seized in the FBI search of Mar-a-Lago, although it was later ruled that a special master was unnecessary. In November, both the office of New York State Attorney General Letitia James and the defense in the civil case against the Trump Organization suggested Jones as an independent monitor to prevent future fraud by the company. She was appointed that month and began monitoring the organization by December.

Legal offices
Preceded by Kenneth Conboy	Judge of the United States District Court for the Southern District of New York; 1995–2012	Succeeded by Gregory H. Woods
