= Kenneth Conboy =

American judge

Judge of the United States District Court for the Southern District of New York
- In office December 21, 1987 – December 31, 1993
- Appointed by: Ronald Reagan
- Preceded by: Robert L. Carter
- Succeeded by: Barbara S. Jones

Personal details
- Born: June 3, 1938 (age 87) New York City, New York
- Spouse: Taffy Conboy
- Education: Fordham College (A.B.); University of Virginia School of Law (J.D.); Columbia University (M.A.)

Kenneth Robert O'Grady Conboy (born June 3, 1938) is a former United States district judge of the United States District Court for the Southern District of New York and retired attorney in private practice.

== Early life ==
Born in New York City, New York, Conboy received an Artium Baccalaureus degree from Fordham College, in 1961, a Juris Doctor from the University of Virginia School of Law, in 1964, and a Master of Arts from Columbia University in 1980. He served in Vietnam in the United States Army from 1964 to 1966 where he achieved the rank of Captain.

== Career ==
Conboy began his career as a trial attorney, Chief of the Rackets Rureau and executive assistant district attorney for the Manhattan District Attorney's Office in New York City from 1966 to 1977. He served as deputy commissioner and general counsel to the New York City Police Department from 1978 to 1983, as criminal justice coordinator for New York City from 1984 to 1986, and as commissioner of investigation from 1986 to 1987.

== Federal judicial service ==
Conboy was nominated by President Ronald Reagan on November 5, 1987, to a seat on the United States District Court for the Southern District of New York vacated by Judge Robert L. Carter. He was confirmed by the United States Senate on December 19, 1987, and received commission on December 21, 1987. His service terminated on December 31, 1993, due to resignation.

== Post judicial service ==
Conboy was in private practice at Latham & Watkins in New York City from 1994 until his retirement on December 31, 2011.

Legal offices
Preceded by Robert L. Carter	Judge of the United States District Court for the Southern District of New York; 1987–1993	Succeeded by Barbara S. Jones
