= Thomas Francis Croake =

American judge

Senior Judge of the United States District Court for the Southern District of New York
- In office January 31, 1972 – July 21, 1978

Judge of the United States District Court for the Southern District of New York
- In office September 22, 1961 – January 31, 1972
- Appointed by: John F. Kennedy
- Preceded by: Seat established by 75 Stat. 80
- Succeeded by: Robert L. Carter

Personal details
- Born: Thomas Francis Croake; January 22, 1902 Saranac Lake, New York
- Died: July 21, 1978 (aged 76) New York City, New York
- Education: Albany Law School (LL.B.)

Thomas Francis Croake (January 22, 1902 – July 21, 1978) was a United States district judge of the United States District Court for the Southern District of New York.

== Education and career ==
Born in Saranac Lake, New York, Croake received a Bachelor of Laws from Albany Law School in 1925. He was an acting city judge of the City of Plattsburgh, New York from 1926 to 1927. He was corporation counsel for the City of Plattsburgh from 1928 to 1932. He was a judge of Clinton County, New York from 1932 to 1938.

== Federal judicial service ==
Croake was nominated by President John F. Kennedy on September 14, 1961, to the United States District Court for the Southern District of New York, to a new seat created by 75 Stat. 80. He was confirmed by the United States Senate on September 21, 1961, and received his commission on September 22, 1961. He assumed senior status on January 31, 1972. His service was terminated on July 21, 1978, due to his death in New York City, New York.

== Sources ==
Legal offices
Preceded by Seat established by 75 Stat. 80	Judge of the United States District Court for the Southern District of New York; 1961–1972	Succeeded by Robert L. Carter
