= Lewis M. Steel =

American civil rights attorney

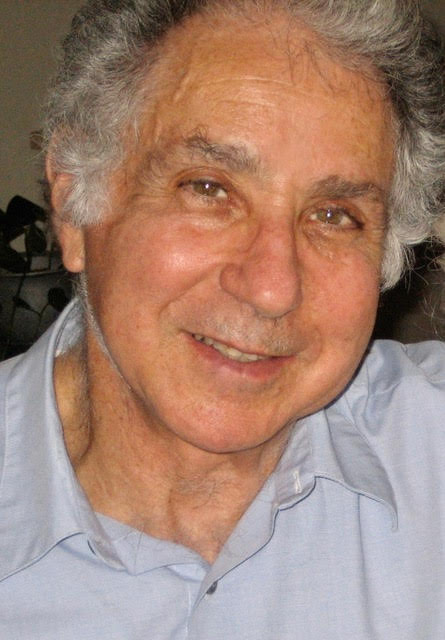
Lewis M. Steel

Lewis M. Steel (born April 25, 1937) is an American civil rights attorney and author who was co-lead counsel of the legal team that freed the boxer Rubin Carter and John Artis after they were wrongly convicted of murder. While working for the NAACP during the 1960s, he worked to desegregate public schools in the North. In 1971 he joined other civil rights lawyers, including William Kunstler, and New York Times columnist Tom Wicker, to negotiate a settlement of the Attica Prison riot. He was the lead attorney in Avagliano v. Sumitomo Shoji America, 457 U.S. 176 (1982) which established that American subsidiaries of foreign corporations must obey American civil rights laws. He works as a civil rights attorney at the New York law firm Outten & Golden LLP.

== Early life and education ==
Steel was born and raised in New York City. His paternal grandmother, Bessie Levy Warner, was a daughter of Moe Levy, who owned an eponymous chain of clothing stores. After her first husband died, she married film executive Albert Warner. Steel attended Culver Military Academy, Harvard College - where he co-founded the Harvard Opera Guild - and New York Law School, where he was editor in chief of the law review.

== Career ==
Steel volunteered to work for the NAACP legal staff and then was hired by NAACP general counsel Robert L. Carter. In his trials, Steel helped develop Carter's legal theory that used psychological evidence to show that school segregation, whether intentional or not, severely damaged Black children, in cases in Cincinnati, Ohio and Kokomo, Indiana. Steel also used that theory and type of evidence in winning a case against Governor James A. Rhodes of Ohio that required public projects using union construction workers to include blacks.

On October 13, 1968 the New York Times Magazine published a controversial article Steel wrote, "Nine Men in Black Who Think White" which argued that "historically, the Supreme Court has been the enemy of the American black man." Steel contended that, after Brown, the Court slowly retreated on numerous racial issues, leaving most Southern school segregation in place, declining to take on northern racial segregation, allowing injunctions preventing peaceful racial demonstrations and ignoring the misuse of urban renewal federal funds which were supposed to rebuild cities but were used instead to construct highways isolating Blacks. On the day of publication, the NAACP board of directors, in a split vote, with Executive Director Roy Wilkins recommending termination, Steel was subsequently fired. In response, Carter, who lauded Steel's work as well as his article, resigned in protest along with his entire legal staff and stated that he believed that the NAACP board had fired Steel because it felt the legal department was taking on cases that were too controversial.

In the decades that followed, Steel pursued civil rights cases in private practice in New York City. In 1980 he and his colleague from the NAACP, Richard Bellman, started the civil rights firm Steel and Bellman PC, and later added Susan Ritz and Miriam Clark as partners. The firm took on cases involving discrimination in housing and employment; they freed the wrongfully accused from jail, and pushed for prison reform. The firm represented plaintiffs in a class action lawsuit that alleged racial discrimination in the hiring and promotion of black and Hispanic workers by the New York City Parks Department. The suit, Wright v. Stern, was settled in 2006 when the Parks Department agreed to pay more than $21 million in damages and fees. After Steel Bellman Ritz & Clark disbanded in 2006, Steel joined Outten & Golden, where he is senior counsel. He also served as general counsel for the Institute for Policy Studies until April 2023.

=== Attica ===
In 1971 Steel, who was a vice-president of the National Lawyers Guild New York City Chapter, went to Attica Correctional Facility as an outside observer trying to prevent the prison authorities from engaging in a bloody attack on the prisoners who controlled a large yard where they held guards and prison workers as hostages. Steel also wanted to protect a client there, William A. "Tony" Maynard, who was serving a manslaughter sentence Steel would later get overturned. At Attica, the observers soon realized that it was not only their job to observe, but to try to negotiate a settlement, which would help resolve some of their complaints ‒ including harsh treatment, bad food, poor medical care, frequent use of solitary confinement and lack of representations at prison hearings. While the prison yard was still in the hands of more than 800 prisoners and their hostage guards and workers, Steel obtained an agreement that the prisoners would not be charged with any property related crimes. Reflecting on the legacy of Attica in a 2016 article in the Nation, Steel wrote that the carnage due to the prison yard attack ordered by Governor Nelson Rockefeller did not lead to reform. "Federal law also turned repressive over the years, with much higher mandatory minimum sentences, especially for the drug crimes involving persons of color, and Congress significantly limited the circumstances in which the federal courts could intervene to require remedies for prison conditions which violated the constitution's Eighth Amendment prohibiting cruel and unusual punishment." Steel also discussed his experience in the documentary Attica in 2021.

=== The Harlem Six ===
In 1964, six black teenagers were accused of murdering a white Harlem store owner and wounding her husband. They were found guilty of murder in 1965. Three years later, the Supreme Court reversed the convictions on constitutional grounds and determined the two defendants who had confessed had to be tried separately. After the two defendants were convicted again, Steel joined civil rights attorney William Kunstler as co-lead counsel to defend the remaining four in a retrial that ended in a hung jury. Steel and Kunstler then negotiated a plea bargain whereby the four pled guilty to manslaughter in return for sentences of time served, which was the eight years they had already spent in prison.

=== Hurricane Carter and John Artis ===
In 1973, Steel, with his co-lead counsel, Myron Beldock, began a twelve-year struggle, working without pay, to overturn the convictions of the middleweight boxer Rubin "Hurricane" Carter and John Artis who had been convicted for the murder of three people at a Patterson, N.J. bar in 1966. The case drew national attention through Carter's 1974 biography, "The Sixteenth Round," and Bob Dylan's 1976 song "Hurricane". The New Jersey Supreme Court overturned their conviction in 1976, after two key witnesses recanted their testimony. They were convicted at a retrial in which the prosecutor added an unsupported claim that their motive was racial revenge. In response to a writ of habeas corpus filed by Steel, Beldock and Leon Friedman, U.S. District Court Judge H. Lee Sarokin overturned their convictions in 1985, ruling that the cases had rested on "an appeal to racism rather than reason" and "concealment rather than disclosure".

In 2000, Steel wrote a commentary in the Los Angeles Times criticizing the film, "The Hurricane" starring Denzel Washington, for transforming Carter's "painful story into a series of false cliches: He was jailed because of one racist cop; he was freed through the efforts of a commune of white people. In reality, Carter was ensnared by an entire criminal justice system."

=== Sumitomo Shoji America Inc. (SSA) ===
In 1982, Steel represented a group of female employees working for the American subsidiary of the multi-national Japanese firm, Sumitomo, in the United States. The women asserted that they were always treated and paid as clericals despite their responsibilities and that they had no opportunity for advancement because of their sex in violation of U.S. anti-discrimination law. The case, Sumitomo Shoji America, Inc. v. Avagliano, reached the U.S. Supreme Court, where Steel won a 9–0 decision that established the precedent that American subsidiaries of foreign companies operating in the U.S. must abide by U.S. anti-discrimination laws.

=== Housing discrimination ===
In 1984, Steel won the largest award granted in a housing discrimination case, $565,000, for two Black female air traffic controllers who were denied rentals at a Long Island apartment complex because of their race. On Huntington, Long Island, they teamed with a nonprofit housing group and the NAACP to successfully challenge the town’s refusal to rezone land to allow publicly-subsidized housing to be built in a primarily white area of town. The New York Times reported that in its decision, “the Court of Appeals for the Second Circuit broadened the interpretation of Federal fair-housing laws by finding racial discrimination based solely on the effect of the town's zoning law. The court ruled that the plaintiffs did not have to prove that the intent of the law was discriminatory'"

Steel also represented Black and Hispanic residents in Williamsburg, Brooklyn who opposed the city’s sale of urban renewal land to the largest Hasidic sect in the area, the Satmars. Steel unsuccessfully argued that this would effectively create an exclusionary “Hasidic enclave” that would drive out Black and Hispanic residents, violating both the First and Fourteenth Amendments, which prohibit government establishment of religion, as well as the Civil Rights Act and the Fair Housing Act. In a 1990 op-ed in the New York Times, Steel criticized the New York Court of Appeals for “rendering decisions in housing, education and employment that have set back the increasingly difficult struggle of minorities to achieve equality.”

=== Suing Donald Trump ===
Sometime in late 1979 or early 1980, Donald Trump was involved in the hiring of 200 undocumented Polish immigrants – who earned $4 to $5 per hour when the minimum wage was $11, working 12-hour shifts under dangerous conditions – to demolish the old Bonwit Teller building in Manhattan to make way for Trump Tower. Years later Steel joined other lawyers who sued Trump for only paying a fraction of what he owed the union's pension and welfare funds, thereby decreasing pension and medical benefits for members of the House Wreckers union, who should have been given the work. Although Trump has long claimed he never settles suits, he paid $1.375 million to settle this case, known as Hardy vs Kaszycki, in 1999. The case became a campaign issue in 2016 when Trump made opposition to illegal immigration a centerpiece of his campaign.

== Later work ==
In 2017, Steel was part of the Outten & Golden team that claimed the U.S. Census Bureau's reliance on criminal arrest records when hiring temporary workers to conduct the decennial count had a substantial disparate impact on African-American and Hispanic job applicants in violation of Title VII, the federal law prohibiting discrimination in the workplace. Their successful class action suit in Gonzalez v. Pritzker resulted in a court approved settlement that led the Bureau to overhaul its hiring process and provide $5 million for a program through the New York State School of Industrial and Labor Relations at Cornell University and the Lawyers' Committee for Civil Rights Under Law that helps people with criminal records increase their employment prospects. As a result, Steel and other members of the Outten & Golden team were named Trial Lawyer of the Year in 2017 by the advocacy group Public Justice.

== Autobiography ==
In 2016, Thomas Dunne Books/St. Martin's Press published The Butler's Child, Steel's autobiography (written with Beau Friedlander) about his experiences growing up in the Warner Brothers family, and his experiences as a civil rights attorney. The University of South Carolina Press republished the book with a new subtitle, "The Butler's Child: White Privilege, Race, and a Lawyer's Life in Civil Rights," and an epilogue by Steel in 2020. Harvard University historian and filmmaker Henry Louis Gates Jr. wrote that, "The breadth of Steel's legal activism over the last half century, as revealed in this remarkable memoir, reminds us of the challenges that loomed in the wake of the Civil Rights gains of the 1960s: the campaign to end northern school segregation; ongoing battles against unemployment, under-employment, and housing discrimination: the pervasive problems of police brutality and a deeply flawed criminal justice system. His compelling, first-hand account of the Attica prison uprising and ensuing massacre sheds fresh light on one of the great tragedies of the "Post Civil Rights" era. A child of privilege, Steel has lived a life dedicated to the pursuit of racial justice, and has written a memoir that is timely, essential and deeply inspiring".

== Personal life ==
Steel married Kitty Muldoon Steel in 1961. They have three children.
