= Richard O'Neill (author) =

Anglo-Irish author (born 1943)

Richard O'Neill (born 1943) is an Anglo-Irish author and editor. Formerly a regular soldier, itinerant labourer and professional boxer, he now specializes in military history and has contributed to many books on weaponry and military history, as well as writing on Victorian painting.

== Bibliography ==
- The Complete Encyclopedia of 20th Century Warships
- The Vietnam War
- An Illustrated History of the Royal Navy
- Presidents of the United States
- The Middle Ages
- World War II
- Suicide Squads - the men and machines of World War II Special Operations, Salamander Books, London, 1999 ISBN 1-84065-082-6
- Natural Disasters
- Paintings of Victorian Childhood
- The Life and Work of Dante Gabriel Rossetti
- Patrick O'Brian's Navy
- Men and Monsters
- Strange World
