= Sweatt v. Painter =

Sweatt v. Painter, et al.
- Supreme Court of the United States

Argued April 4, 1950 Decided June 5, 1950
- Full case name: Heman Marion Sweatt v. Theophilus Shickel Painter
- Citations: 339 U.S. 629 (more) 70 S. Ct. 848; 94 L. Ed. 1114; 1950 U.S. LEXIS 1809

Case history
- Prior: Cert. to the Supreme Court of Texas

Holding
- Segregation as applied to the admissions processes for law school in the United States violates Equal Protection Clause of the Fourteenth Amendment, because separate facilities in legal education are inherently unequal. Texas Supreme Court reversed.

Court membership
- Chief Justice Fred M. Vinson Associate Justices Hugo Black · Stanley F. Reed; Felix Frankfurter · William O. Douglas; Robert H. Jackson · Harold H. Burton; Tom C. Clark · Sherman Minton

Case opinion
- Majority: Vinson, joined by unanimous

Sweatt v. Painter, 339 U.S. 629 (1950), was a United States Supreme Court case that successfully challenged the "separate but equal" doctrine of racial segregation established by the 1896 case Plessy v. Ferguson. The case was influential in the landmark case of Brown v. Board of Education four years later.

The case involved a black man, Heman Marion Sweatt, who was refused admission to the School of Law of the University of Texas, whose president was Theophilus Painter, on the grounds that the Texas State Constitution prohibited integrated education. The Supreme Court ruled in favor of law student Sweatt, reasoning that the state's racially separate law school was in fact unequal. Nonetheless, the court limited its ruling in finding that it was not [yet] necessary to

reach [Sweatt]'s contention that Plessy v. Ferguson should be reexamined in the light of contemporary knowledge respecting the purposes of the Fourteenth Amendment and the effects of racial segregation.

The decision was delivered on the same day as another case involving similar issues, McLaurin v. Oklahoma State Regents, also decided in favor of integrated graduate education.

== Procedural history ==
Heman Sweatt was originally refused admission to the University of Texas Law School in 1946, solely on the grounds that he was black. Texas' 126th district court in Travis County, Texas, instead of granting the plaintiff a writ of mandamus, continued the case for six months in 1946 and 1947. This allowed the state time to create a law school only for black students, which it established in Houston rather than in Austin. The 'separate' law school and the college became the Thurgood Marshall School of Law at Texas Southern University. (Note: Known then as "Texas State University for Negroes")

The Dean of the Law School at the time was Charles T. McCormick. He wanted a separate law school for black students.

Texas Attorney General at the time was Price Daniel who advocated fiercely for racial segregation.

The trial court decision was affirmed by the Court of Civil Appeals and the Texas Supreme Court denied writ of error on further appeal. Sweatt and the NAACP next went to the federal courts, and the case ultimately reached the U.S. Supreme Court. Robert L. Carter and Thurgood Marshall presented Sweatt's case.

== U.S. Supreme Court ==
The Supreme Court reversed the lower court decision, saying that the separate school failed to qualify, both because of quantitative differences in facilities and experiential factors, such as its isolation from most of the future lawyers with whom its graduates would interact. The court held that, when considering graduate education, experience must be considered as part of "substantive equality." The court's decision documented the differences between white and black facilities:

- The University of Texas Law School had 16 full-time and 3 part-time professors, while the black law school had 5 full-time professors.
- The University of Texas Law School had 850 students and a law library of 65,000 volumes, while the black law school had 23 students and a library of 16,500 volumes.
- The University of Texas Law School had moot court facilities, an Order of the Coif affiliation, and numerous graduates involved in public and private law practice, while the black law school had only one practice court facility and only one graduate admitted to the Texas Bar.

== Legacy ==
On June 14, 2005, the Travis County Commissioners voted to rename the courthouse as The Heman Marion Sweatt Travis County Courthouse in honor of Sweatt's endeavor and victory.

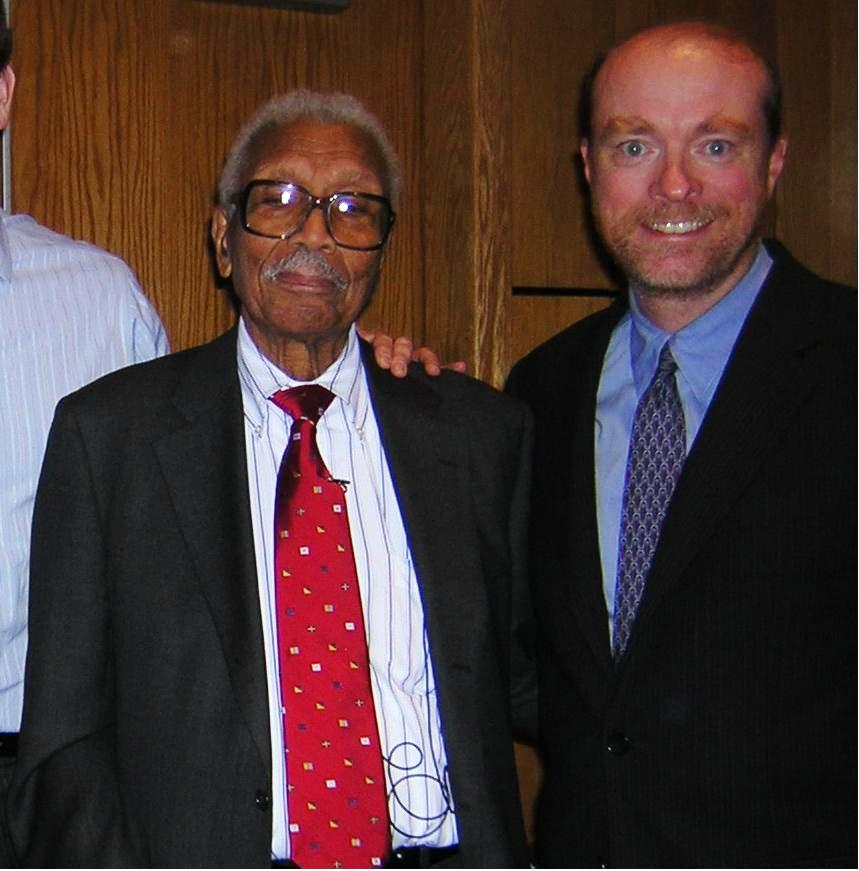
Lead attorney on Sweatt, Judge Robert L. Carter, with the then-dean of Fordham Law School, William Treanor

== See also ==
- List of United States Supreme Court cases, volume 339
- Sipuel v. Board of Regents of Univ. of Okla.
- McLaurin v. Oklahoma State Regents
