= McLaurin v. Oklahoma State Regents =

- Supreme Court of the United States

Argued April 3–4, 1950 Decided June 5, 1950
- Full case name: McLaurin v. Oklahoma State Regents for Higher Education, et al.
- Citations: 339 U.S. 637 (more) 70 S. Ct. 851; 94 L. Ed. 1149; 1950 U.S. LEXIS 1810

Case history
- Prior: Appeal from the United States District Court for the Western District of Oklahoma

Holding
- Different treatment of students in public institutions of higher learning solely on the basis of race violates the Equal Protection Clause of the 14th Amendment.

Court membership
- Chief Justice Fred M. Vinson Associate Justices Hugo Black · Stanley F. Reed; Felix Frankfurter · William O. Douglas; Robert H. Jackson · Harold H. Burton; Tom C. Clark · Sherman Minton

Case opinion
- Majority: Vinson, joined by unanimous

McLaurin v. Oklahoma State Regents, 339 U.S. 637 (1950), was a United States Supreme Court case that prohibited racial segregation in state supported graduate or professional education. The unanimous decision was delivered on the same day as another case involving similar issues, Sweatt v. Painter.

== Facts ==
The plaintiff, George W. McLaurin, who already had a master's degree in education, was first denied admission to the University of Oklahoma to pursue a Doctorate in Education degree. McLaurin successfully sued in the U.S. District Court for the Western District of Oklahoma to gain admission to the institution (87 F. Supp. 526; 1948 U.S. Dist.) basing his argument on the Fourteenth Amendment. At the time, Oklahoma law prohibited schools from instructing blacks and whites together. The court found that the university's inaction in providing separate facilities, in order to meet Oklahoma state law, allowing McLaurin to attend the institution was a violation of his Constitutional rights. However, the court did not issue any injunctive relief as requested by the plaintiff but rather relied "on the assumption that the law having been declared, the State will comply."

The University admitted McLaurin but provided him separate facilities, including a special table in the cafeteria, and a designated and screened desk in the library. Depending on the classroom, he was provided a desk just outside the classroom doorway, or in the classroom closet. Sometimes he was made to eat at different times than the other students.

McLaurin returned to the U.S. District court and petitioned to require the University of Oklahoma to remove the separate facilities, and instead allow him to interact with the professors and other students fully (87 F. Supp. 528; 1949 U.S. Dist.) The court denied McLaurin's petition.

== Finding of the court ==
McLaurin then appealed to the U.S. Supreme Court. On June 5, 1950, the United States Supreme Court ruled that a public institution of higher learning could not provide different treatment to a student solely because of his/her race as doing so deprived the student of his/her Fourteenth Amendment rights of Equal Protection.

Accordingly, the high court reversed the decision of the U.S. District Court, requiring the University of Oklahoma to remove the restrictions under which McLaurin was attending the institution. This case together with Sweatt v. Painter, which was decided the same day, marked the end of the separate but equal doctrine of Plessy v. Ferguson in graduate and professional education.

== Commemoration ==
In 2008, the Bizzell Memorial Library, the main library at the University of Oklahoma, was designated a U.S. National Historic Landmark in commemoration of this case. The case was heard in Oklahoma City at the Post Office, Courthouse, and Federal Office Building.

== See also ==
- NCAA v. Board of Regents of the University of Oklahoma
- Sipuel v. Board of Regents of the University of Oklahoma
- Sweatt v. Painter
- List of landmark African-American legislation
- List of United States Supreme Court cases, volume 339
