= 2002 Philadelphia Eagles season =

70th season of American football franchise

- Owner: Jeffrey Lurie
- General manager: Andy Reid
- Head coach: Andy Reid
- Home stadium: Veterans Stadium

Results
- Record: 12–4
- Division place: 1st NFC East
- Playoffs: Won Divisional Playoffs (vs. Falcons) 20–6; Lost NFC Championship (vs. Buccaneers) 10–27
- All-Pros: T Tra Thomas (2nd team); G Jermane Mayberry (2nd team); K David Akers (2nd team); DE Hugh Douglas (2nd team); CB Troy Vincent (1st team); CB Bobby Taylor (2nd team); FS Brian Dawkins (1st team)
- Pro Bowlers: T Tra Thomas; QB Donovan McNabb; TE Chad Lewis; T Jon Runyan; G Jermane Mayberry; DE Hugh Douglas; CB Troy Vincent; CB Bobby Taylor; FS Brian Dawkins; K David Akers

The 2002 Philadelphia Eagles season was their 70th in the National Football League. The team improved upon their previous output of eleven wins, going 12–4 and making the playoffs for the third consecutive year.

This was the first of three consecutive NFC top seeds for the Eagles. The Eagles' record gave the team a tie for the best record in the NFL, despite losing franchise quarterback Donovan McNabb and backup quarterback Koy Detmer during the regular season, and due to tiebreakers, gave them the top seed in the NFC, a first-round bye, and home-field advantage throughout the NFC playoffs.

The Eagles suffered arguably their worst loss at home in franchise history when they were upset by a score of 27–10 in the NFC Championship Game against the Tampa Bay Buccaneers, who went on to win Super Bowl XXXVII. The Eagles had easily defeated the Buccaneers in the playoffs in each of the previous two seasons, and many experts thought that this season's Conference Championship game would be no different. The game was the final football game played at Veterans Stadium, as the Eagles would move in to their new home field in the 2003 season.

== Offseason ==
Additions	Subtractions
LB Shawn Barber (Redskins)	LB Mike Caldwell (Bears)
WR Antonio Freeman (Packers)	LB Jeremiah Trotter (Redskins)
RB Dorsey Levens (Packers)	
LB Levon Kirkland (Seahawks)	

=== 2002 expansion draft ===
Philadelphia Eagles selected during the expansion draft
Round	Overall	Name	Position	Expansion team
—	12	Ryan Schau	Tackle	Houston Texans

=== NFL draft ===
2002 Philadelphia Eagles draft
Round	Pick	Player	Position	College	Notes
1	26	Lito Sheppard *	CB	Florida	
2	58	Michael Lewis *	S	Colorado	
2	59	Sheldon Brown	CB	South Carolina	from Miami
3	91	Brian Westbrook *	RB	Villanova	
4	124	Scott Peters	C	Arizona State	
5	162	Freddie Milons	WR	Alabama	
Made roster † Pro Football Hall of Fame * Made at least one Pro Bowl during career

=== Undrafted free agents ===
2002 undrafted free agents of note
Player	Position	College
Kori Dickerson	Tight end	USC
Steve Edwards	Tackle	Central Florida
Justin Ena	Linebacker	BYU
Artis Hicks	Tackle	Memphis
Corey McIntyre	Fullback	West Virginia
Jason McKie	Fullback	Temple
Ryan Nielsen	Tackle	USC

== Staff ==
2002 Philadelphia Eagles staff
Front office: Chairman/Chief Executive Officer – Jeffrey Lurie; President – Joe Banner; Executive vice president of football operations – Andy Reid; Director of player personnel – Tom Heckert; Director of college scouting – Marc Ross; Director of pro personnel – Scott Cohen; Head coaches: Head coach – Andy Reid; Offensive coaches: Offensive coordinator – Brad Childress; Quarterbacks – Pat Shurmur; Running backs – Ted Williams; Wide receivers – David Culley; Tight ends – Tom Melvin; Offensive line – Juan Castillo; Offensive quality control – Mike Kelly	Defensive coaches: Defensive coordinator – Jim Johnson; Defensive line – Tommy Brasher; Linebackers – Ron Rivera; Defensive backs – Leslie Frazier; Defensive backs/secondary – Steve Spagnuolo; Defensive assistant/quality control – Sean McDermott; Special teams coaches: Special teams coordinator – John Harbaugh; Special teams/quality control – Dave Toub; Strength and conditioning: Head athletic trainer – Rick Burkholder; Strength and conditioning – Mike Wolf; Assistant strength and conditioning – Tom Kanavy; Assistant trainer – Eric Sugarman

== Roster ==
=== Opening training camp roster ===
Philadelphia Eagles 2002 opening training camp roster
Quarterbacks: 10 Koy Detmer; 14 A. J. Feeley; 11 Tim Hasselbeck; 5 Donovan McNabb; Running backs: 25 Dorsey Levens; 38 Cecil Martin FB; 47 Corey McIntyre FB ^{UR}; -- Jason McKie FB ^{UR}; 30 Brian Mitchell; 34 Jamie Reader FB; 24 Rod Smart; 22 Duce Staley; 36 Brian Westbrook ^{R}; Wide receivers: 85 Na Brown; 82 Dameane Douglas; 13 David Foye; -- Carlos Johnson ^{UR}; -- Brian McDonald; 85 Freddie Milons ^{R}; 84 Freddie Mitchell; 19 Sean Morey (American football); 87 Todd Pinkston; 86 Gari Scott; -- Sean Scott; -- Lawrence Story ^{UR}; 80 James Thrash; Tight ends: 81 Kori Dickerson ^{UR}; 89 Chad Lewis; 81 Tony Stewart; 83 Jeff Thomason	Offensive linemen: 74 Doug Brzezinski G; -- Steve Edwards T ^{UR}; -- Pita Elisara T; 63 Hank Fraley C/G; 77 Artis Hicks T ^{UR}; -- Dwayne Ledford C; 71 Jermane Mayberry G/T; -- Josh Moore G/T; 62 Scott Peters C/G ^{R}; -- Kendrick Rogers T; -- Frank Romero (footballer) G ^{UR}; 69 Jon Runyan T; 72 Tra Thomas T; 76 John Welbourn T/G; 66 Bobbie Williams G; Defensive linemen: 56 Derrick Burgess DE; 53 Hugh Douglas (American football) DE; 96 Paul Grasmanis DT; 94 N. D. Kalu DE; 73 Ivory McCoy DE ^{UR}; -- Russell Newman DT; -- Ryan Nielsen DT ^{UR}; -- Marcus Roberson DT ^{UR}; 90 Corey Simon DT; 79 Jeremy Slechta DT ^{UR}; 78 Hollis Thomas DT; 97 Darwin Walker DT; 98 Brandon Whiting DT/DE; -- Daryl Whittington DE	Linebackers: 56 Shawn Barber OLB; 55 Quinton Caver LB; 51 Carlos Antoine Emmons OLB; 59 Justin Ena MLB ^{UR}; 52 Barry Gardner OLB; 55 Tyreo Harrison MLB ^{R}; 93 Levon Kirkland MLB; -- Josh Parry LB; 58 Ike Reese LB; Defensive backs: 24 Blaine Bishop SS; 39 Sheldon Brown CB ^{R}; 42 Rashard Cook S; 29 Darrel Crutchfield CB; 20 Brian Dawkins FS; 41 William Hampton CB; 31 Al Harris CB; 33 Clinton Hart FS; 27 Julian Jones FS; 32 Michael Lewis SS ^{R}; 26 Lito Sheppard CB ^{R}; 21 Bobby Taylor CB; 23 Troy Vincent CB; Special teams: 2 David Akers K; 88 Mike Bartrum; -- Steve Cheek P; 7 Sean Landeta P; -- Eric Meng K	Reserve lists: 28 Correll Buckhalter RB (Active/PUP); Notations: R: 2002 Drafted Rookie; UR: 2002 Undrafted Rookie

== Preseason ==
Week	Date	Opponent	Result	Record	Venue	Recap
1	August 10	Green Bay Packers	W 20–13	1–0	Veterans Stadium	Recap
2	August 17	at New England Patriots	L 15–16	1–1	Gillette Stadium	Recap
3	August 23	Baltimore Ravens	L 12–13	1–2	Veterans Stadium	Recap
4	August 30	at New York Jets	L 16–23	1–3	Giants Stadium	Recap

== Regular season ==
=== Schedule ===
Week	Date	Opponent	Result	Record	Venue	Recap
1	September 8	at Tennessee Titans	**L** 24–27	0–1	The Coliseum	Recap
2	September 16	at **Washington Redskins**	**W** 37–7	1–1	FedExField	Recap
3	September 22	**Dallas Cowboys**	**W** 44–13	2–1	Veterans Stadium	Recap
4	September 29	Houston Texans	**W** 35–17	3–1	Veterans Stadium	Recap
5	October 6	at Jacksonville Jaguars	**L** 25–28	3–2	Alltel Stadium	Recap
6	Bye					
7	October 20	Tampa Bay Buccaneers	**W** 20–10	4–2	Veterans Stadium	Recap
8	October 28	**New York Giants**	**W** 17–3	5–2	Veterans Stadium	Recap
9	November 3	at Chicago Bears	**W** 19–13	6–2	Memorial Stadium	Recap
10	November 10	Indianapolis Colts	**L** 13–35	6–3	Veterans Stadium	Recap
11	November 17	Arizona Cardinals	**W** 38–14	7–3	Veterans Stadium	Recap
12	November 25	at San Francisco 49ers	**W** 38–17	8–3	3Com Park	Recap
13	December 1	St. Louis Rams	**W** 10–3	9–3	Veterans Stadium	Recap
14	December 8	at Seattle Seahawks	**W** 27–20	10–3	Seahawks Stadium	Recap
15	December 15	**Washington Redskins**	**W** 34–21	11–3	Veterans Stadium	Recap
16	December 21	at **Dallas Cowboys**	**W** 27–3	12–3	Texas Stadium	Recap
17	December 28	at **New York Giants**	**L** 7–10 (OT)	12–4	Giants Stadium	Recap

Note: Intra-division opponents are in bold text.

=== Game summaries ===
==== Week 1: at Tennessee Titans ====
Week 1: Philadelphia Eagles at Tennessee Titans

Quarter	1	2	3	4	Total
Eagles	14	10	0	0	**24**
**Titans**	7	3	3	14	**27**

at The Coliseum, Nashville, Tennessee

- Date: September 8, 2002
- Game time: 12:00 PM
- Game weather: Hot and Hazy, 83 °F (28.3 °C)
- Game attendance: 68,804
- Referee: Terry McAulay (77)
- TV announcers (FOX): Dick Stockton, Daryl Johnston, Don Tollefson
- Recap, Game Book

Game information

**First quarter**

- TEN – Eddie George 14-yard pass from Steve McNair (Joe Nedney kick), 7:10. Titans 7-0. **Drive: 8 plays, 80 yards, 5:19.**
- PHI – James Thrash 18-yard pass from Donovan McNabb (David Akers kick), 5:20. Tied 7-7. **Drive: 2 plays, 6 yards, 0:53.**
- PHI – Duce Staley 7-yard pass from Donovan McNabb (David Akers kick), 2:36. Eagles 14-7. **Drive: 6 plays, 61 yards, 2:44.**

**Second quarter**

- TEN – Joe Nedney 33-yard field goal, 11:00. Eagles 14-10. **Drive: 10 plays, 75 yards, 6:36.**
- PHI – Chad Lewis 7-yard pass from Donovan McNabb (David Akers kick), 5:05. Eagles 21-10. **Drive: 11 plays, 80 yards, 5:55.**
- PHI – David Akers 30-yard field goal, 0:48. Eagles 24-10. **Drive: 4 plays, 18 yards, 1:00.**

**Third quarter**

- TEN – Joe Nedney 47-yard field goal, 11:06. Eagles 24-13. **Drive: 8 plays, 51 yards, 3:54.**

**Fourth quarter**

- TEN – Justin McCareins 2-yard pass from Steve McNair (2PT run failed), 12:49. Eagles 24-19. **Drive: 6 plays, 67 yards, 2:21.**
- TEN – Eddie George 2-yard run (Eddie George run), 3:09. Titans 27-24. **Drive: 14 plays, 84 yards, 5:41.**

**Top passers**

- PHI – Donovan McNabb – 18/36, 212 yards, 3 TD, 2 INT
- TEN – Steve McNair – 24/34, 269 yards, 2 TD, INT

**Top rushers**

- PHI – Brian Westbrook – 8 rushes, 42 yards
- TEN – Eddie George – 18 rushes, 42 yards, TD

**Top receivers**

- PHI – Antonio Freeman – 3 receptions, 54 yards
- TEN – Derrick Mason – 7 receptions, 109 yards

==== Week 2 ====
Team	1	2	3	4	Total
• **Eagles**	14	9	7	7	37
Redskins	0	7	0	0	7

- Date: September 16
- Location: FedExField • Landover, Maryland
- Game start: 9:00 p.m. EST
- Game attendance: 84,892
- Referee: Bob McElwee
- TV announcers (ABC): Al Michaels, John Madden, and Melissa Stark

The Eagles crushed the Steve Spurrier-led Washington Redskins on Monday Night Football by a score of 37–7. Philadelphia found the end zone on their first two drives. Donovan McNabb scored after he was flushed from the pocket on 3rd and goal, and he hit Jeff Thomason for a short touchdown pass on the next possession. Washington's only points came early in the second quarter on a 90-yard punt return by Jacquez Green. The Eagles added three field goals before the half to open up a 23–7 lead. McNabb, despite the fact that he was late hit on the play, completed a 39-yard touchdown pass to James Thrash in the third quarter. Dorsey Levens broke a 47-yard touchdown run in the fourth quarter to make it 37–7. The Eagles outgained the Redskins 451–179, and the defense forced three turnovers. The most drama probably occurred in the fourth quarter when a strange airborne substance, which turned out to be pepper spray used by stadium security, began making players and fan cough near the Philadelphia sideline. McNabb threw for 292 yards and two touchdowns and Thrash had 107 receiving yards and a touchdown.

==== Week 3 ====
Team	1	2	3	4	Total
Cowboys	10	0	3	0	13
• **Eagles**	3	17	14	10	44

- Date: September 22
- Location: Veterans Stadium • Philadelphia
- Game start: 1:00 p.m. EST
- Game weather: 84 °F (29 °C) (Sunny)
- Referee: Tom White
- TV announcers (Fox): Pat Summerall and Brian Baldinger

Overcoming a slow start, the Eagles blasted the Dallas Cowboys 44–13 in their home opener. David Akers booted a 51-yard field goal early on, but Reggie Swinton returned the ensuing kickoff 100 yards for the Cowboys. Dallas took a 10–3 lead on a field goal, but the Eagles bounced back in the second quarter. Donovan McNabb hooked up with receiver James Thrash on a 35-yard touchdown and he took it in himself from two yards out four minutes later as Philadelphia moved into the lead 17–10. Akers made a short field goal before halftime to make it 20–10. In the third quarter, McNabb looked to run, but instead threw to a wide open Antonio Freeman for a 59-yard touchdown play. Then, Brian Westbrook threw a 25-yard touchdown pass to Todd Pinkston on a trick play, and the route was on. McNabb added a fourth-quarter touchdown pass to Pinkston after a 17-play drive that consumed eight minutes. McNabb threw for 287 yards and three touchdowns. The defense collected four turnovers (to give them 11 for the season at that point) and sacked Quincy Carter four times.

==== Week 4 ====
Team	1	2	3	4	Total
Texans	0	7	0	10	17
• **Eagles**	3	17	8	7	35

- Date: September 29
- Location: Veterans Stadium • Philadelphia, Pennsylvania
- Game start: 1:00 p.m. EST
- Game weather: 72 °F (22 °C) (Sunny)
- Referee: Johnny Grier
- TV announcers (CBS): Don Criqui and Steve Tasker

Philadelphia overcame another slow start with another big second quarter and a big effort from safety Brian Dawkins to defeat the expansion Houston Texans 35–17. David Carr completed a 23-yard touchdown to Corey Bradford to give Houston an early 7–0 lead. Following a David Akers field goal, the Eagles took control in the second quarter behind two short rushing touchdowns by Duce Staley (with the first being set up by a Dawkins fumble recovery) and another field goal to go up 20–7 by halftime. Philadelphia then used a trick play to score its next touchdown. With a punt formation in, the direct snap went to Brian Mitchell who started to run and then flipped it past the defense to Dawkins, who raced 57 yards for the score. After the two-point conversion, the Eagles led 28–7. The Texans came back with another touchdown to Bradford and a field goal to close to 28–17, but Donovan McNabb (who signed a 12-year contract extension the week before the game) sealed the deal with a 38-yard touchdown to James Thrash. Dawkins became the first player in NFL history to record a sack, recover a fumble, intercept a pass, and catch a touchdown pass in the same game. McNabb, who had early accuracy issues, threw for 259 yards. The defense sacked Carr seven times.

==== Week 5 ====
Team	1	2	3	4	Total
Eagles	0	7	3	15	25
• **Jaguars**	3	11	0	14	28

- Date: October 6
- Location: Alltel Stadium • Jacksonville, Florida
- Game start: 4:15 p.m.
- Game weather: 87°
- Referee: Gerald Austin
- TV announcers (Fox): Sam Rosen, Bill Maas, Ryan Elijah

Another sloppy performance against an AFC South opponent meant a 28–25 defeat for the Eagles in Jacksonville. Trailing 6–0 after a pair of field goals by the Jacksonville Jaguars, Philadelphia took the lead on 4-yard touchdown pass to Chad Lewis. With less than two minutes left in the half and Jacksonville set to punt, the Eagles were flagged with too many men on the field, resulting in a Jaguar first down. Mark Brunell took his team quickly down the field and fired a touchdown to Kyle Brady. The two-point conversion gave Jacksonville a 14–7 halftime lead. After a David Akers field goal, Jacksonville receiver Jimmy Smith beat Bobby Taylor and took the ball to inside the Eagle 5-yard line, leading to an easy Jacksonville touchdown. Later in the fourth quarter, Jaguar return man Bobby Shaw took a punt back for a touchdown (the third return for a touchdown against the Eagles in four weeks) to make it 28–10 and put the game out of reach. Donovan McNabb, who was sacked five times and was visibly ill in the fourth quarter, rallied the Eagles to two late touchdowns, but Philadelphia came up three points short. McNabb rushed for 100 yards and Duce Staley rushed for 82. The defending NFC East champion Eagles fell to 3–2 as they went into the bye.

==== Week 7 ====
Team	1	2	3	4	Total
Buccaneers	7	0	3	0	10
• **Eagles**	3	7	3	7	20

- Date: October 20
- Location: Veterans Stadium • Philadelphia, Pennsylvania
- Game start: 4:15 p.m. EST
- Game weather: 56 °F (13 °C) (Partly Cloudy)
- Referee: Ron Winter
- TV announcers (Fox): Dick Stockton, Cris Collinsworth, Troy Aikman and Pam Oliver

Duce Staley and the defense turned in great performances as the Eagles scored a big win over the Tampa Bay Buccaneers. Philadelphia scored first on a 30-yard field goal by David Akers, however the Bucs took the lead when Derrick Brooks picked up a Donovan McNabb fumble and returned it 11 yards for a touchdown six minutes into the first quarter. In the second quarter, after Brian Mitchell returned a punt into Tampa Bay territory, McNabb hit Todd Pinkston on a fly route for a 42-yard touchdown and a 10–7 lead. The Eagles and Bucs traded field goals in the third quarter as the Philadelphia defense (ranked #2 in the league behind Tampa) preserved the narrow lead. In the fourth quarter, McNabb scored on a short run himself on a long drive to give the Eagles a 20–10 lead. Staley rushed for 152 yards on 24 carries, while the defense registered four sacks and knocked Tampa quarterback Brad Johnson out of the game with cracked ribs. The win made the Eagles 4–2 with an undefeated record against opponents in their conference.

==== Week 8 ====
Team	1	2	3	4	Total
Giants	0	0	3	0	3
• **Eagles**	3	6	0	8	17

- Date: October 28
- Location: Veterans Stadium • Philadelphia, Pennsylvania
- Game start: 9:00 p.m. EST
- Game weather: 43 °F (6 °C) (Clear)
- Referee: Bill Carollo
- TV announcers (ABC): Al Michaels, John Madden and Melissa Stark

After a big win over Tampa Bay, the Eagles did not let down, defeating the New York Giants at home on Monday Night Football 17–3. A 27-yard kick by David Akers gave the Eagles a 3–0 lead. Tiki Barber's 31-yard run in the second quarter set up a field goal for New York, but the Eagles answered with two more field goals to take a 9–3 lead. The Giants best chance to score was broken up when safety Blaine Bishop stripped Charles Stackhouse near the goalline, knocking the ball out of the end zone for a touchback. In the fourth quarter with the ball on Giant 40-yard line on third down, Donovan McNabb was flushed from the pocket and took off on a 40-yard scramble down the left side for a touchdown, picking up key blocks from John Welbourn and Todd Pinkston. McNabb completed the two-point conversion to Chad Lewis. McNabb rushed for 111 yards and Duce Staley picked up 126 yards. The Eagles went 5–2 and took a two-game lead in the division race.

==== Week 9: at Chicago Bears ====
Week 9: Philadelphia Eagles (5–2) at Chicago Bears (2–5) – Game summary

Quarter	1	2	3	4	Total
**Eagles**	0	7	6	6	**19**
Bears	0	13	0	0	**13**

at Memorial Stadium, Champaign, Illinois

- Date: November 3, 2002
- Game time: 1:00 p.m.
- Game weather: Light rain 38 °F (3 °C)
- Game attendance: 54,049
- Referee: Terry McAulay (77)
- TV: FOX (Dick Stockton, Daryl Johnston and Ron Pitts)
- Recap, Game Book

Game information

**First quarter**

- No scoring plays.

**Second quarter**

- CHI – Paul Edinger 30-yard field goal, 9:28. Bears 3–0. **Drive: 11 plays, 66 yards, 5:19.**
- PHI – Donovan McNabb 5-yard run (David Akers kick), 4:42. Eagles 7–3. **Drive: 10 plays, 73 yards, 4:46.**
- CHI – Anthony Thomas 6-yard run (Paul Edinger kick), 1:17. Bears 10–7. **Drive: 7 plays, 69 yards, 3:25.**
- CHI – Paul Edinger 53-yard field goal, 0:00. Bears 13–7. **Drive: 5 plays, 42 yards, 0:38.**

**Third quarter**

- PHI – David Akers 23-yard field goal, 10:22. Bears 13–10. **Drive: 10 plays, 54 yards, 4:38.**
- PHI – David Akers 36-yard field goal, 5:42. Tied 13–13. **Drive: 7 plays, 19 yards, 3:22.**

**Fourth quarter**

- PHI – David Akers 27-yard field goal, 13:29. Eagles 16–13. **Drive: 4 plays, 9 yards, 1:13.**
- PHI – David Akers 22-yard field goal, 3:42. Eagles 19–13. **Drive: 5 plays, 64 yards, 2:40.**

**Top passers**

- PHI – Donovan McNabb – 18/33, 209 yards, INT
- CHI – Jim Miller – 19/36, 205 yards

**Top rushers**

- PHI – Donovan McNabb – 9 rushes, 46 yards, TD
- CHI – Anthony Thomas – 16 rushes, 52 yards, TD

**Top receivers**

- PHI – Antonio Freeman – 4 receptions, 67 yards
- CHI – Anthony Thomas – 4 receptions, 52 yards

==== Week 10 ====
Team	1	2	3	4	Total
• **Colts**	14	0	14	7	35
Eagles	3	3	0	7	13

- Date: November 10
- Location: Veterans Stadium • Philadelphia, Pennsylvania
- Game start: 1:00 p.m. EST
- Game weather: 71 °F (22 °C) (Partly Cloudy)
- Referee: Bernie Kukar
- TV announcers (CBS): Dick Enberg, Dan Dierdorf and Bonnie Bernstein

Peyton Manning and the Indianapolis Colts trounced the Eagles 35–13 in their worst loss since 1999. Philadelphia scored first on a field goal, but then Manning began to pick apart the Eagles' defense, driving the Colts to two first-quarter touchdowns. The Eagles got another field goal in the second quarter to make it 14–6, but the Colts put the game away in the third quarter when Manning completed touchdown passes to Reggie Wayne and Marvin Harrison. The only Eagle touchdown would be a 2-yard touchdown pass to tight end Jeff Thomason. Manning would go 18-for-23 with 319 passing yards and three touchdowns, rookie running back James Mungro carried for 114 yards and two scores, while Harrison and Wayne each had over 100 receiving yards. McNabb was 27-for-47 with 281 yards. The Eagles fell to 1–3 against the AFC and 6–3 overall.

==== Week 11: vs. Arizona Cardinals ====
Week 11: Arizona Cardinals (4–5) at Philadelphia Eagles (6–3) – Game summary

Quarter	1	2	3	4	Total
Cardinals	7	7	0	0	**14**
**Eagles**	7	21	3	7	**38**

at Veterans Stadium, Philadelphia, Pennsylvania

- Date: November 17
- Game time: 1:05 p.m. EST/11:05 a.m. MST
- Game weather: 43 °F (6 °C)
- Game attendance: 64,990
- Referee: Bill Leavy
- TV announcers (FOX): Sam Rosen, Bill Maas
- Box Score

Game information

**First quarter**

- ARI – Jason McAddley 12-yard pass from Jake Plummer (Bill Gramática kick), 9:18. Cardinals 7–0.
- PHI – James Thrash 2-yard pass from Donovan McNabb (David Akers kick), 6:25. Tied 7–7.

**Second quarter**

- PHI – Dorsey Levens 3-yard pass from Donovan McNabb (David Akers kick), 9:56. Eagles 14–7.
- ARI – Joel Makovicka 2-yard pass from Jake Plummer (Bill Gramática kick), 7:43. Tied 14–14.
- PHI – Todd Pinkston 27-yard pass from Donovan McNabb (David Akers kick), 3:11. Eagles 21–14.
- PHI – Duce Staley 9-yard pass from Donovan McNabb (David Akers kick), 1:02. Eagles 28–14.

**Third quarter**

- PHI – David Akers 34-yard field goal, 5:55. Eagles 31–14.

**Fourth quarter**

- PHI – James Thrash 4-yard run (David Akers kick), 8:21. Eagles 38–14.

**Top passers**

- ARI – Jake Plummer – 20/35, 163 yards, 2 TD, INT
- PHI – Donovan McNabb – 20/25, 255 yards, 4 TD, INT

**Top rushers**

- ARI – Marcel Shipp – 9 rushes, 76 yards
- PHI – Duce Staley – 31 rushes, 135 yards

**Top receivers**

- ARI – Marcel Shipp – 5 receptions, 50 yards
- PHI – Duce Staley – 3 receptions, 82 yards, TD

**Team** – pass – rush – total – to

- ARI – 163 – 124 – 248 – 1
- PHI – 255 – 212 – 462 – 2

In probably the gutsiest performance of Donovan McNabb's career, the quarterback played an entire game on a broken ankle and threw four touchdown passes to lead the Eagles past the Arizona Cardinals 38–14. On the third play from scrimmage, McNabb was sacked by LaVar Woods and Adrian Wilson, resulting in what was initially believed to be a sprained ankle. With Arizona ahead 7–0, McNabb (who was limited to either throwing quickly or handing off), took the Eagles down the field and completed a 2-yard touchdown pass to James Thrash. He found Dorsey Levens for another short touchdown in the second quarter. Jake Plummer and the Cardinals tied the game at 14–14, but McNabb hit Todd Pinkston with a 27-yard pass to give Philadelphia a lead it would not relinquish. Just before halftime, McNabb completed his fourth touchdown pass – a 9-yarder to Duce Staley. In the second half, the Eagles added a field goal and a 9-yard touchdown run by Thrash. McNabb had gone 20-for-25 for 255 yards and four scores, while Staley contributed 136 rushing yards. After the game, x-rays revealed that McNabb had actually broken his ankle. The injury would keep him out until at least the playoffs. Despite a 7–3 record, the prevailing belief was that the Eagles' Super Bowl run had been derailed with the loss of McNabb.

==== Week 12 ====
Team	1	2	3	4	Total
• **Eagles**	0	21	14	3	38
49ers	0	7	10	0	17

- Date: November 25
- Location: San Francisco Park • San Francisco, California
- Game start: 9:00 p.m. EST
- Referee: Dick Hantak
- TV announcers (ABC): Al Michaels, John Madden, Melissa Stark

Andy Reid initially called former Dallas Cowboys quarterback Troy Aikman to ask him to come out of retirement and become the Eagles' starter with Donovan McNabb injured, but Aikman declined. Eagles backup Koy Detmer was named the starter instead. On a Monday Night Football game in San Francisco, the Eagles won in an improbable 38–17 blowout over the 7–3 49ers in the team's first game without McNabb. Detmer led the Eagles to a touchdown early in the second quarter, completing a 25-yard touchdown pass along the sideline to Todd Pinkston for the lead. Brian Mitchell followed with a 76-yard punt return touchdown (his NFL-record 13th) to make it 14–0 Philadelphia. After the 49ers scored on a Terrell Owens touchdown reception, Detmer made it 21–7 with a touchdown strike to Antonio Freeman. Detmer dove the ball in himself in the third quarter to open up a 28–10 lead for the Eagles, but during a drive later in the quarter, Detmer dislocated his elbow and was taken from the field in obvious pain. Third-string quarterback A. J. Feeley entered the game and immediately hit Chad Lewis with a short touchdown pass for Philadelphia's fifth touchdown. Owens would catch one more touchdown, but the defense, which had four sacks, mostly held the San Francisco offense in check. Detmer had statistically the best night of his career, throwing for 227 yards and two touchdowns. Pinkston had 6 catches for 94 yards. The Eagles went to 8–3 with a 7–0 record within the NFC.

==== Week 13 ====
Team	1	2	3	4	Total
Rams	0	3	0	0	3
• **Eagles**	7	3	0	0	10

- Date: December 1
- Location: Veterans Stadium • Philadelphia, Pennsylvania
- Game weather: 35 °F (2 °C) (Partly Cloudy)
- Referee: Bob McElwee
- TV announcers (Fox): Joe Buck, Troy Aikman, Cris Collinsworth and Pam Oliver

A strong defensive effort helped the Eagles defeat the St. Louis Rams 10–3 in a rematch of the 2001 NFC Championship Game. Cornerback Bobby Taylor returned a Kurt Warner interception 23 yards for a touchdown. David Akers kicked a 31-yarder in the second quarter to give Philadelphia a 10–0 lead. The Rams could only muster a field goal over the entire game. The Eagles picked off two passes (including one by Troy Vincent that ended a late St. Louis scoring threat) and recovered three fumbles. N.D. Kalu had half of the team's eight sacks of Warner, and Marshall Faulk was held to 29 yards rushing. A. J. Feeley, with 181 passing yards, was efficient in his debut by avoiding any interceptions. The Eagles improved to 9–3 with the win.

==== Week 14: at Seattle Seahawks ====
Week 14: Philadelphia Eagles (9–3) at Seattle Seahawks (4–8) – Game summary

Quarter	1	2	3	4	Total
**Eagles**	7	13	7	0	**27**
Seahawks	6	0	7	7	**20**

at Seahawks Stadium, Seattle

- Date: December 8
- Game time: 1:05pm local
- Game weather: clear, 45 °F (7 °C), 74% humidity, wind S 5 miles per hour (8.0 km/h)
- Game attendance: 59,862
- Referee: Bill Carollo
- TV announcers (Fox): Curt Menefee, Tim Ryan, and Brent Ringenbach
- Gamecenter, Gamebook

Game information

**First quarter**

- SEA – Rian Lindell 34-yard field goal, 9:19 (SEA 3–0)
- SEA – Rian Lindell 43-yard field goal, 4:53 (SEA 6–0)
- PHI – James Thrash 6-yard pass from A.J. Feeley (David Akers kick), 0:13 (PHI 7–6)

**Second quarter**

- PHI – Duce Staley 21-yard run (David Akers kick), 8:59 (PHI 14–6)
- PHI – David Akers 33-yard field goal, 4:00 (PHI 17–6)
- PHI – David Akers 40-yard field goal, 0:08 (PHI 20–6)

**Third quarter**

- PHI – Todd Pinkston 20-yard pass from A.J. Feeley (David Akers kick), 9:51 (PHI 27–6)

**Fourth quarter**

- SEA – Darrell Jackson 8-yard pass from Matt Hasselbeck (Rian Lindell kick), 2:04 (PHI 27–13)
- SEA – Jerramy Stevens 11-yard pass from Matt Hasselbeck (Rian Lindell kick), 0:45 (PHI 27–20)

**Top passers**

- PHI – A.J. Feeley: 21/35, 190 yds, 2 TD, 1 INT
- SEA – Matt Hasselbeck: 24/45, 223 yds, 2 TD, 3 INT

**Top rushers**

- PHI – Duce Staley: 21 car, 100 yds, 1 TD
- SEA – Shaun Alexander: 17 car, 123 yds

**Top receivers**

- PHI – Todd Pinkston: 7 rec, 88 yds, 1 TD
- SEA – Bobby Engram: 5 rec, 48 yds

**Team** – pass – rush – total – to

- PHI – 190 – 126 – 316 – 1
- SEA – 195 – 172 – 367 – 3

The Eagles won again behind third-string quarterback A. J. Feeley, downing the Seattle Seahawks 27–20. The Seahawks drove for field goals on their first two possessions to take a 6–0 lead. Brian Mitchell had a good return on the ensuing kickoff, Feeley then converted a couple of big third downs before connecting with James Thrash for a 6-yard touchdown pass. In the second quarter, Duce Staley broke a 21-yard touchdown run to make it 14–6 Eagles. Two David Akers field goals later, and the Eagles led 20–6 at halftime. Rookie Sheldon Brown picked off Matt Hasselbeck and Feeley followed with a 20-yard touchdown pass to Todd Pinkston. After Seattle narrowed the score to 27–13, Akers missed a fourth-quarter field goal that would have put the game away. Hasselbeck responded with another touchdown pass to make it 27–20, but the Eagles recovered the onside kick and ended the game. Philadelphia sacked Hasselbeck four times and intercepted him three times. Staley rushed for 100 yards, while Shaun Alexander gained 123 for Seattle. Feeley threw for 190 yards and two touchdowns, while Pinkston had 7 catches for 88 yards. The Eagles had now won a season-high four straight games and were 10–3.

==== Week 15 ====
Team	1	2	3	4	Total
Redskins	0	7	0	14	21
• **Eagles**	7	10	14	3	34

- Date: December 15
- Location: Veterans Stadium • Philadelphia, Pennsylvania
- Game start: 1:00 EST
- Game weather: 46 °F (8 °C) (Sunny)
- Referee: Johnny Grier
- TV announcers (FOX): Dick Stockton and Daryl Johnston

Playing in the final regular season game at Veterans Stadium, the Eagles clinched their second straight NFC East title after an easy 34–21 win. On Washington's first drive, rookie safety Michael Lewis recovered a Stephen Davis fumble for the Eagles. Duce Staley scored on a 38-yard catch-and-run to give Philadelphia a 7–0 lead. The Eagles added a field goal and a short Staley rushing touchdown in the second quarter to go ahead 17–0. Ahead 17–7 in the third quarter, Eagle linebacker Carlos Emmons recovered a fumble, and after not being touched by the Redskins, proceeded to return it 44 yards for a touchdown. Washington went three-and-out, and A. J. Feeley led the Eagles on an 80-yard drive capped off by a 6-yard touchdown pass to Antonio Freeman to bury the Redskins 31–7. Washington scored two "trash time" touchdowns in the fourth quarter. Feeley threw for 220 yards and two touchdowns, and Staley had 106 yards from scrimmage and a pair of scores. Philadelphia's defense forced and recovered three fumbles. The Eagles were now amazingly undefeated since the McNabb injury and were playoff-bound with an 11–3 record. Despite Koy Detmer being healthy enough to start vs Dallas, Andy Reid decided to stick with A. J. Feeley, who was having success .

==== Week 16 ====
Team	1	2	3	4	Total
• **Eagles**	7	10	0	10	27
Cowboys	0	0	0	3	3

- Date: December 21
- Location: Texas Stadium • Irving, Texas
- Referee: Ed Hochuli
- TV announcers (ESPN): Mike Patrick, Joe Theismann, Paul Maguire and Suzy Kolber

The Eagles brushed aside the hapless, Dave Campo-led Dallas Cowboys 27–3 at Texas Stadium. Duce Staley ran it in from 5 yards out in the first quarter and Todd Pinkston caught a 14-yard touchdown pass from A. J. Feeley in the second quarter as the Eagles went to halftime with a 17–0 lead. The Eagles defense harassed Dallas quarterback Chad Hutchinson throughout the game, sacking him seven times and holding him to 128 passing yards. A Joey Galloway punt return inside the Philadelphia 10-yard was wasted for Dallas when the Eagles defense held and forced a turnover on downs. The Cowboys got on the board with a field goal on their next drive, and were deep in Philadelphia territory on their next drive when Shawn Barber intercepted Hutchinson and returned the ball 80 yards to put the game away. David Akers added his second field goal as the Eagles went ahead 27–3. Staley and rookie Brian Westbrook combined for 111 rushing yards. Feeley had 253 passing yards, one touchdown, and two interceptions. Antonio Freeman had four catches for 82 yards. Philadelphia went to 12–3, 11–0 within the NFC.

==== Week 17 ====
Team	1	2	3	4	OT	Total
Eagles	7	0	0	0	0	7
• **Giants**	0	0	0	7	3	10

- Date: December 28
- Location: Giants Stadium • East Rutherford, New Jersey
- Referee: Ron Blum
- TV announcers (Fox): Joe Buck, Cris Collinsworth, Troy Aikman and Pam Oliver

With the New York Giants playing for a wild card berth and the Eagles playing for homefield advantage throughout the playoffs, the Giants edged the Eagles 10–7 in overtime. Philadelphia moved down the field on their opening drive, scoring on a 20-yard reverse to James Thrash, but their offense would struggle throughout the rest of the game. The Giants moved the ball well, with Tiki Barber rushing for 203 yards and receiving 73 yards. However, Barber had three fumbles lost that helped keep New York off the board until the fourth quarter, when rookie tight end Jeremy Shockey took the ball away from safety Brian Dawkins in the air in the end zone. With the score tied and five minutes left, Dawkins stripped Barber (his third fumble) and the Eagles recovered at the Giant 26-yard line, but David Akers missed a 35-yard field goal and the game went to overtime. On their first possession, the Giants maneuvered into Eagle territory and Matt Bryant kicked the 36-yard game winner. The Giants outgained the Eagles 461–209 and A. J. Feeley had his worst game of the season, going 13-for-25 for 150 yards with an interception. The Eagles finished the season 12–4, and still received homefield advantage throughout the playoffs when the Green Bay Packers were defeated the next day.

== Postseason ==
=== Schedule ===
Round	Date	Opponent (seed)	Result	Record	Venue	Recap
Wild Card	First-round bye					
Divisional	January 11, 2003	Atlanta Falcons (6)	W 20–6	1–0	Veterans Stadium	Recap
NFC Championship	January 19, 2003	Tampa Bay Buccaneers (2)	L 10–27	1–1	Veterans Stadium	Recap

=== Game summaries ===
==== NFC Divisional Playoffs: vs. (6) Atlanta Falcons ====
NFC Divisional Playoffs: (6) Atlanta Falcons at (1) Philadelphia Eagles – Game summary

Quarter	1	2	3	4	Total
Falcons	0	6	0	0	6
Eagles	10	3	0	7	20

at Veterans Stadium, Philadelphia, Pennsylvania

- Date: January 11, 2003
- Game time: 8:00 p.m. EST
- Game weather: 29 °F (−2 °C), clear
- Game attendance: 66,452
- Referee: Mike Carey
- TV announcers (Fox): Dick Stockton (play-by-play), Daryl Johnston (color commentator), and Ron Pitts (sideline reporter)

Game information

First quarter

- PHI – Bobby Taylor 39-yard interception return (David Akers kick), 7:58. Eagles 7–0
- PHI – David Akers 34-yard field goal, 3:47. Eagles 10–0. Drive: 6 plays, 47 yards, 2:27.

Second quarter

- PHI – David Akers 39-yard field goal, 10:05. Eagles 13–0. Drive: 9 plays, 65 yards, 5:05.

Third quarter

- ATL – Jay Feely 34-yard field goal, 4:10. Eagles 13–3. Drive: 13 plays, 61 yards, 5:55.
- ATL – Jay Feely 52-yard field goal, 0:00. Eagles 13–6. Drive: 10 plays, 45 yards, 1:49.

Fourth quarter

- PHI – James Thrash 35-yard pass from Donovan McNabb (David Akers kick), 6:26. Eagles 20–6. Drive: 10 plays, 75 yards, 5:42.

Top passers

- ATL – Michael Vick – 22/38, 274 yards, 2 INT
- PHI – Donovan McNabb – 20/30, 247 yards, TD

Top rushers

- ATL – Warrick Dunn – 14 rushes, 45 yards
- PHI – Duce Staley – 18 rushes, 63 yards

Top receivers

- ATL – Brian Finneran – 5 receptions, 72 yards
- PHI – James Thrash – 2 receptions, 77 yards, TD

After enjoying a first-round bye, the Eagles opened up their playoff quest against the Atlanta Falcons. The Falcons, led by second-year quarterback Michael Vick, went 9–6–1 during the season. Though they stumbled towards the end of the season, losing three of their final four, the Falcons upset the 12–4 Green Bay Packers at Lambeau Field in the Wild Card playoffs 27–7. For the Eagles, quarterback Donovan McNabb was back under center after missing the final six games with a broken ankle.

Seven minutes into the game, on Atlanta's second possession, Vick was intercepted on the left side by cornerback Bobby Taylor, who returned the ball 39 yards for a Philadelphia touchdown. McNabb led the Eagles to field goals on their next two drives, and by the middle of the second quarter, it was 13–0 Philadelphia. The Falcons got on the board with a 13-play drive capped by a short Jay Feely field goal. After the Eagles punted, Vick took the Falcons on a 9-play drive in two minutes to set up a 52-yard Feely field goal to end the half with the score 13–6.

After a 51-yard field goal miss by David Akers in the third quarter, the Falcons drove into the Philadelphia red zone. On second down, Vick took off on a dash towards the end zone. Brian Dawkins delivered a crushing hit that left both players sprawled on the turf, but Vick had reached the end zone and it appeared the game would be tied. However, a holding call negated the touchdown and two plays later, Feely missed a short field goal. In the fourth quarter, McNabb guided the Eagles down the field with a series of short passes and on 4th and 1 from the Atlanta 35-yard line, he found James Thrash over the middle and Thrash sailed untouched into the end zone for the game-sealing touchdown. Ahead 20–6, Philadelphia drained the clock on their next possession and Vick threw an interception to Dawkins to end the game.

McNabb was an efficient 20-for-30 for 250 yards and a touchdown in his return. He also had a 19-yard scramble on the Eagles' first drive. The defense played a strong game, sacking Vick three times, holding Warrick Dunn to 45 yards rushing, and limiting Atlanta to just two field goals. Vick had 274 passing yards, but he threw two interceptions.

==== NFC Championship: vs. (2) Tampa Bay Buccaneers ====
NFC Championship: (2) Tampa Bay Buccaneers at (1) Philadelphia Eagles – Game summary

Quarter	1	2	3	4	Total
Buccaneers	10	7	3	7	27
Eagles	7	3	0	0	10

at Veterans Stadium, Philadelphia, Pennsylvania

- Game time: 3:00 p.m. EST
- Game weather: 26 °F (−3 °C), mostly cloudy
- Game attendance: 66,713
- Referee: Terry McAulay
- TV announcers (Fox): Joe Buck (play-by-play), Troy Aikman, Cris Collinsworth (color commentators), and Pam Oliver (sideline reporter)

Game information

First quarter

- PHI – Duce Staley 20-yard run (David Akers kick), 14:08. Eagles 7–0. Drive: 2 plays, 26 yards, 0:52.
- TB – Martín Gramática 48-yard field goal, 9:58. Eagles 7–3. Drive: 9 plays, 37 yards, 4:10.
- TB – Mike Alstott 1-yard run (Martín Gramática kick), 0:40. Buccaneers 10–7. Drive: 7 plays, 96 yards, 3:15.

Second quarter

- PHI – David Akers 30-yard field goal, 8:04. Tied 10–10. Drive: 8 plays, 26 yards, 3:53.
- TB – Keyshawn Johnson 9-yard pass from Brad Johnson (Martín Gramática kick), 2:28. Buccaneers 17–10. Drive: 12 plays, 80 yards, 5:36.

Third quarter

- TB – Martín Gramática 27-yard field goal, 1:02. Buccaneers 20–10. Drive: 8 plays, 43 yards, 3:55.

Fourth quarter

- TB – Ronde Barber 92-yard interception return (Martín Gramática kick), 3:12. Buccaneers 27–10.

Top passers

- TB – Brad Johnson – 20/33, 259 yards, TD, INT
- PHI – Donovan McNabb – 26/49, 243 yards, INT

Top rushers

- TB – Mike Alstott – 17 rushes, 25 yards, TD
- PHI – Duce Staley – 13 rushes, 58 yards, TD

Top receivers

- TB – Michael Pittman – 5 receptions, 53 yards
- PHI – Chad Lewis – 6 receptions, 65 yards

The Eagles rode the momentum of their divisional playoff win against Atlanta into the NFC Championship against the Tampa Bay Buccaneers. The favored Eagles appeared destined to win the conference title and propel themselves into the Super Bowl. They had beaten the Buccaneers at home in each of the last two postseasons and in October 2002, they had defeated Tampa Bay 20–10. The Buccaneers had never won a road playoff game and were 1–22 in games under 40 °F (4 °C) (it would be 26 °F (−3 °C) at kickoff). However, the greatly underestimated Buccaneers defense had been dominant in 2002, allowing the fewest points in the league, fewest passing yards, and fewest passing touchdowns, intercepting the most passes, and held the San Francisco 49ers to two field goals in the divisional playoff the previous week. The game would be the final one for the Eagles at Veterans Stadium, and the resulting game turned out to be disaster for the Eagles. Their fans at home were dealt a crushing upset 27–10 defeat against the underdog Buccaneers.

Brian Mitchell returned the opening kickoff 70 yards for the Eagles. Two plays later, Duce Staley broke through the middle for a 20-yard touchdown in the game's first minute. The Eagles led 7–0, the Philadelphia crowd was deafening, and the Eagles now looked certain to cruise to victory. The Buccaneers recovered quickly, driving for a 48-yard Martin Gramatica field goal on their first possession. The Eagles punted on their next drive, pinning Tampa Bay at their own 4-yard line. On 3rd-and-2 from the Tampa 24-yard line, quarterback Brad Johnson hit Joe Jurevicius on a crossing route over the middle. Jurevicius badly beat veteran safety Blaine Bishop, who was playing injured, on the coverage and ran down the sideline all the way to the Eagle 5-yard line. The 71-yard play turned the tide of the game and Mike Alstott finished the drive with a touchdown to put Tampa Bay ahead 10–7. In the second quarter, Philadelphia drove into the Tampa Bay red zone and tied the game with a 30-yard David Akers field goal. However, the Buccaneers began a 12-play drive on the ensuing kickoff that ended in a 9-yard touchdown pass from Brad Johnson to Keyshawn Johnson, making it 17–10 Tampa Bay. Donovan McNabb took the Eagles back into Tampa Bay territory before halftime, but Simeon Rice sacked McNabb and recovered the resultant fumble.

On the Eagles' first possession of the third quarter, McNabb lost the ball again on a sack, this time near midfield. With a minute left in the third quarter, Tampa Bay added another field goal to take a 20–10 lead. Philadelphia had trouble moving the ball throughout most of the second half as their hopes faded. With less than four minutes to play, the Eagles drove to the Tampa Bay 10-yard line, but McNabb was intercepted by Ronde Barber who returned the ball all the way for a touchdown to end the game.

McNabb was 26-for-49 for 243 yards with an interception and two fumbles lost and a 58.5 passer rating, while Johnson was an efficient 20-for-33 for 259 yards and a score. Staley was held to 58 yards rushing, while the Eagles defense did manage to hold the Buccaneers to only 49 rushing yards. The heartbreaking loss, which was made all of the more painful when Tampa Bay went on to easily defeat the Oakland Raiders in the Super Bowl one week later, is consistently rated as one of the worst in Philadelphia sports history and became known as "Black Sunday."

== Final roster ==
Philadelphia Eagles 2002 final roster
Quarterbacks: 10 Koy Detmer; 14 A. J. Feeley; 11 Tim Hasselbeck; 5 Donovan McNabb; Running backs: 25 Dorsey Levens; 38 Cecil Martin FB; 30 Brian Mitchell RS; 22 Duce Staley; 36 Brian Westbrook; Wide receivers: 82 Dameane Douglas; 86 Antonio Freeman; 85 Freddie Milons; 84 Freddie Mitchell; 87 Todd Pinkston; 80 James Thrash; Tight ends: 89 Chad Lewis; 83 Jeff Thomason	Offensive linemen: 74 Doug Brzezinski G; 63 Hank Fraley C; 77 Artis Hicks T; 71 Jermane Mayberry G; 62 Scott Peters C/G; 69 Jon Runyan T; 72 Tra Thomas T; 76 John Welbourn G; 66 Bobbie Williams G; Defensive linemen: 59 Derrick Burgess DE; 53 Hugh Douglas DE; 96 Paul Grasmanis DT; 94 N. D. Kalu DE; 90 Corey Simon DT; 79 Jeremy Slechta DT; 97 Darwin Walker DT; 98 Brandon Whiting DE	Linebackers: 57 Keith Adams OLB; 56 Shawn Barber OLB; 51 Carlos Emmons OLB; 95 Justin Ena OLB; 52 Barry Gardner MLB; 54 Tyreo Harrison OLB; 93 Levon Kirkland MLB; 58 Ike Reese OLB; Defensive backs: 24 Blaine Bishop SS; 39 Sheldon Brown CB; 20 Brian Dawkins FS; 31 Al Harris CB; 32 Michael Lewis SS; 26 Lito Sheppard CB; 21 Bobby Taylor CB; 23 Troy Vincent CB; Special teams: 2 David Akers K; 88 Mike Bartrum LS; 6 Lee Johnson P	Reserve lists: 28 Correll Buckhalter RB (PUP); 42 Rashard Cook S (IR); 7 Sean Landeta P (IR); 78 Hollis Thomas DT (IR); Practice squad: 81 Kori Dickerson TE; 33 Clinton Hart S; 17 Tee Martin QB; 73 Ivory McCoy DE; 47 Corey McIntyre FB; Notations: Rookies are in italics; 53 active, 4 inactive, 5 practice squad

== Standings ==
=== Division ===
NFC East
	W	L	T	PCT	DIV	CONF	PF	PA	STK
^{(1)} Philadelphia Eagles	12	4	0	.750	5–1	11–1	415	241	L1
^{(5)} New York Giants	10	6	0	.625	5–1	8–4	320	279	W4
Washington Redskins	7	9	0	.438	1–5	4–8	307	365	W2
Dallas Cowboys	5	11	0	.313	1–5	3–9	217	329	L4

=== Conference ===
NFC
#	Team	Division	W	L	T	PCT	DIV	CONF	SOS	SOV
Division leaders
1 (Note: Philadelphia finished ahead of Tampa Bay and Green Bay based on conference record (11–1 vs 9–3/9–3).)	Philadelphia Eagles	East	12	4	0	.750	5–1	11–1	.469	.432
2 (Note: Tampa Bay finished ahead of Green Bay based on head-to-head victory.)	Tampa Bay Buccaneers	South	12	4	0	.750	4–2	9–3	.482	.432
3	Green Bay Packers	North	12	4	0	.750	5–1	9–3	.451	.414
4	San Francisco 49ers	West	10	6	0	.625	5–1	8–4	.504	.450
Wild Cards
5	New York Giants	East	10	6	0	.625	5–1	8–4	.482	.450
6	Atlanta Falcons	South	9	6	1	.594	4–2	7–5	.494	.429
Did not qualify for the postseason
7	New Orleans Saints	South	9	7	0	.563	3–3	7–5	.498	.566
8 (Note: St. Louis finished ahead of Seattle based on division record (4–2 to 2–4).)	St. Louis Rams	West	7	9	0	.438	4–2	5–7	.508	.446
9	Seattle Seahawks	West	7	9	0	.438	2–4	5–7	.506	.433
10 (Note: Washington finished ahead of Carolina based on common games (2–3 to 1–4))	Washington Redskins	East	7	9	0	.438	1–5	4–8	.527	.438
11	Carolina Panthers	South	7	9	0	.438	1–5	4–8	.486	.357
12	Minnesota Vikings	North	6	10	0	.375	4–2	5–7	.498	.417
13 (Note: Arizona finished ahead of Dallas based on head-to-head victory.)	Arizona Cardinals	West	5	11	0	.313	1–5	5–7	.500	.400
14	Dallas Cowboys	East	5	11	0	.313	1–5	3–9	.500	.475
15	Chicago Bears	North	4	12	0	.250	2–4	3–9	.521	.430
16	Detroit Lions	North	3	13	0	.188	1–5	3–9	.494	.375
Tiebreakers (Note: When breaking ties for three or more teams under the NFL's rules, they are first broken within divisions, then comparing only the highest-ranked remaining team from each division.)
