= 2001 Philadelphia Eagles season =

69th season in franchise history; first in series of NFC Championship game appearances

- Owner: Jeffrey Lurie
- General manager: Andy Reid
- Head coach: Andy Reid
- Offensive coordinator: Rod Dowhower
- Defensive coordinator: Jim Johnson
- Home stadium: Veterans Stadium

Results
- Record: 11–5
- Division place: 1st NFC East
- Playoffs: Won Wild Card Playoffs (vs. Buccaneers) 31–9; Won Divisional Playoffs (at Bears) 33–19; Lost NFC Championship (at Rams) 24–29
- Pro Bowlers: QB Donovan McNabb; OT Tra Thomas; DE Hugh Douglas; LB Jeremiah Trotter; CB Troy Vincent; FS Brian Dawkins; PK David Akers; TE Chad Lewis

The 2001 season was the Philadelphia Eagles' 69th in the National Football League (NFL) and their third under head coach Andy Reid.

The Eagles clinched a playoff berth for the second straight year, matching their 11–5 from the previous season. In the postseason, the Eagles defeated the Tampa Bay Buccaneers 31–9 in the Wild Card Round and the Chicago Bears 33–19 in the Divisional Round. In the NFC Championship Game however, the Eagles were defeated by the St. Louis Rams 29–24.

== Background ==
After defeating the Tampa Bay Buccaneers in the wildcard round for the second year in a row, and the Chicago Bears in the divisional round, the Eagles advanced to the NFC Championship for the first time in twenty-one years, but lost 29–24 to the St. Louis Rams. The Rams advanced to the Super Bowl, but were unable to stop the New England Patriots, losing 20–17.

This was the first of four consecutive NFC East titles for the Eagles. It was also the first of five Conference Championship game appearances for the Eagles with Donovan McNabb as starting quarterback and Andy Reid as head coach.

== Offseason ==
=== Draft ===
2001 Philadelphia Eagles draft
Round	Pick	Player	Position	College	Notes
1	25	Freddie Mitchell	WR	UCLA	
2	55	Quinton Caver	LB	Arkansas	
3	63	Derrick Burgess	DE	Ole Miss	
4	121	Correll Buckhalter	RB	Nebraska	
5	147	Tony Stewart	TE	Penn State	
5	155	A.J. Feeley	QB	Oregon	
Made roster † Pro Football Hall of Fame * Made at least one Pro Bowl during career

== Staff ==
2001 Philadelphia Eagles staff
Front office: Chairman/Chief Executive Officer – Jeffrey Lurie; President – Joe Banner; Executive vice president of football operations – Andy Reid; Director of player personnel – Tom Heckert; Director of college scouting – Marc Ross; Director of pro personnel – Scott Cohen; Head coaches: Head coach – Andy Reid; Offensive coaches: Offensive coordinator – Rod Dowhower; Quarterbacks – Brad Childress; Running backs – Ted Williams; Wide receivers – David Culley; Tight ends/offensive line – Pat Shurmur; Offensive line – Juan Castillo; Offensive assistant/quality control – Tom Melvin	Defensive coaches: Defensive coordinator – Jim Johnson; Defensive line – Tommy Brasher; Linebackers – Ron Rivera; Defensive backs – Leslie Frazier; Defensive backs/secondary – Steve Spagnuolo; Defensive assistant/quality control – Sean McDermott; Special teams coaches: Special teams coordinator – John Harbaugh; Special teams/quality control – Dave Toub; Strength and conditioning: Head athletic trainer – Rick Burkholder; Strength and conditioning – Mike Wolf; Assistant strength and conditioning – Tom Kanavy; Volunteer assistant strength and conditioning – Chris DiSanto; Assistant trainer – Eric Sugarman

== Roster ==
Philadelphia Eagles 2001 final roster
Quarterbacks: 10 Koy Detmer; 14 A. J. Feeley; 5 Donovan McNabb; Running backs: 28 Correll Buckhalter; 38 Cecil Martin FB; 30 Brian Mitchell RS; 34 Jamie Reader FB; 24 Rod Smart; 22 Duce Staley; Wide receivers: 85 Na Brown; 82 Dameane Douglas; 84 Freddie Mitchell; 87 Todd Pinkston; 86 Gari Scott; 80 James Thrash; Tight ends: 89 Chad Lewis; 81 Tony Stewart; 83 Jeff Thomason	Offensive linemen: 74 Doug Brzezinski G; 63 Hank Fraley C; 71 Jermane Mayberry G; 73 Jim Pyne C; 69 Jon Runyan T; 67 Ryan Schau T; 72 Tra Thomas T; 76 John Welbourn G; 66 Bobbie Williams G; Defensive linemen: 59 Derrick Burgess DE; 53 Hugh Douglas DE; 96 Paul Grasmanis DT; 91 Uhuru Hamiter DE; 94 N. D. Kalu DE; 90 Corey Simon DT; 97 Darwin Walker DT; 98 Brandon Whiting DE	Linebackers: 56 Mike Caldwell OLB; 55 Quinton Caver OLB; 51 Carlos Emmons OLB; 52 Barry Gardner MLB; 58 Ike Reese OLB; 54 Jeremiah Trotter MLB; Defensive backs: 42 Rashard Cook CB/FS; 29 Darrel Crutchfield CB; 20 Brian Dawkins FS; 41 William Hampton CB/S; 31 Al Harris CB; 45 Tim Hauck SS; 43 Damon Moore SS; 21 Bobby Taylor CB; 23 Troy Vincent CB; Special teams: 2 David Akers K; 88 Mike Bartrum LS; 7 Sean Landeta P	Reserve lists: 27 Julian Jones S (IR); 65 Bubba Miller C (IR); 25 Monty Montgomery CB (IR); 78 Hollis Thomas DT (IR); Practice squad: 93 Pernell Davis DT; 95 John Frank DE; 75 Kendrick Rogers T; 16 Sean Scott WR; 57 Dax Strohmeyer LB; rookies in italics 53 active, 4 inactive, 5 practice squad

== Regular season ==
=== Schedule ===
Week	Date	Opponent	Result	Record	Venue	Recap
1	September 9	St. Louis Rams	**L** 17–20 (OT)	0–1	Veterans Stadium	Recap
2	September 23	at Seattle Seahawks	**W** 27–3	1–1	Husky Stadium	Recap
3	September 30	**Dallas Cowboys**	**W** 40–18	2–1	Veterans Stadium	Recap
4	October 7	**Arizona Cardinals**	**L** 20–21	2–2	Veterans Stadium	Recap
5	Bye					
6	October 22	at **New York Giants**	**W** 10–9	3–2	Giants Stadium	Recap
7	October 28	Oakland Raiders	**L** 10–20	3–3	Veterans Stadium	Recap
8	November 4	at **Arizona Cardinals**	**W** 21–7	4–3	Sun Devil Stadium	Recap
9	November 11	Minnesota Vikings	**W** 48–17	5–3	Veterans Stadium	Recap
10	November 18	at **Dallas Cowboys**	**W** 36–3	6–3	Texas Stadium	Recap
11	November 25	**Washington Redskins**	**L** 3–13	6–4	Veterans Stadium	Recap
12	November 29	at Kansas City Chiefs	**W** 23–10	7–4	Arrowhead Stadium	Recap
13	December 9	San Diego Chargers	**W** 24–14	8–4	Veterans Stadium	Recap
14	December 16	at **Washington Redskins**	**W** 20–6	9–4	FedExField	Recap
15	December 22	at San Francisco 49ers	**L** 3–13	9–5	3Com Park	Recap
16	December 30	**New York Giants**	**W** 24–21	10–5	Veterans Stadium	Recap
17	January 6	at Tampa Bay Buccaneers	**W** 17–13	11–5	Raymond James Stadium	Recap

Note: Intra-division opponents are in bold text.

=== Game summaries ===
==== Week 6 ====
The Eagles were able to break a nine-game losing streak against the Giants by winning this game. James Thrash caught the winning TD from Donovan McNabb in the fourth quarter.

Team	1	2	3	4	Total
• Eagles	0	0	3	7	10
Giants	3	6	0	0	9

- Date: October 22
- Location: Giants Stadium, East Rutherford, New Jersey
- Game start: 9:00 p.m. EST
- Game attendance: 78,821
- Game weather: 65 °F (18 °C), wind 11 mph (18 km/h)
- Referee: Jeff Triplette
- TV announcers (ABC): Al Michaels, Dan Fouts, and Dennis Miller

Scoring summary
1	NYG	Morten Andersen 24 yard field goal	Giants 3–0
2	NYG	Morten Andersen 21 yard field goal	Giants 6–0
2	NYG	Morten Andersen 24 yard field goal	Giants 9–0
3	PHI	David Akers 25 yard field goal	Giants 9–3
4	PHI	James Thrash 18 yard pass from Donovan McNabb (David Akers kick)	Eagles 10–9

=== Standings ===
NFC East
	W	L	T	PCT	PF	PA	STK
^{(3)} Philadelphia Eagles	11	5	0	.688	343	208	W2
Washington Redskins	8	8	0	.500	256	303	W2
New York Giants	7	9	0	.438	294	321	L2
Arizona Cardinals	7	9	0	.438	295	343	L1
Dallas Cowboys	5	11	0	.313	246	338	L1

== Postseason ==
=== Schedule ===
Round	Date	Opponent (seed)	Result	Record	Venue	Recap
Wild Card	January 12, 2002	Tampa Bay Buccaneers (6)	W 31–9	1–0	Veterans Stadium	Recap
Divisional	January 19, 2002	at Chicago Bears (2)	W 33–19	2–0	Soldier Field	Recap
NFC Championship	January 27, 2002	at St. Louis Rams (1)	L 24–29	2–1	Edward Jones Dome	Recap

=== Game summaries ===
==== NFC Wild Card Playoffs: vs. (6) Tampa Bay Buccaneers ====
NFC Wild Card Playoffs: (6) Tampa Bay Buccaneers at (3) Philadelphia Eagles – Game summary

Quarter	1	2	3	4	Total
Buccaneers	3	6	0	0	9
Eagles	3	14	7	7	31

at Veterans Stadium, Philadelphia, Pennsylvania

- Date: January 12, 2002
- Game time: 4:30 p.m. EST
- Game weather: 46 °F (8 °C), clear
- Game attendance: 65,846
- Referee: Larry Nemmers
- TV announcers (ABC): Mike Patrick (play-by-play), Joe Theismann, Paul Maguire (color commentators), and Suzy Kolber (sideline reporter)

Game information

First quarter

- TB – Martín Gramática 36-yard field goal, 10:48. Buccaneers 3–0. Drive: 7 plays, 21 yards, 3:10.
- PHI – David Akers 26-yard field goal, 6:18. Tied 3–3. Drive: 7 plays, 58 yards, 4:30.

Second quarter

- PHI – Chad Lewis 16-yard pass from Donovan McNabb (David Akers kick), 12:17. Eagles 10–3. Drive: 5 plays, 73 yards, 2:33.
- TB – Martín Gramática 32-yard field goal, 6:13. Eagles 10–6. Drive: 10 plays, 65 yards, 6:04.
- PHI – Duce Staley 23-yard pass from Donovan McNabb (David Akers kick), 0:35. Eagles 17–6. Drive: 6 plays, 31 yards, 1:11.
- TB – Martín Gramática 27-yard field goal, 0:00. Eagles 17–9. Drive: 5 plays, 53 yards, 0:35.

Third quarter

- PHI – Correll Buckhalter 25-yard run (David Akers kick), 6:57. Eagles 24–9. Drive: 6 plays, 60 yards, 2:30.

Fourth quarter

- PHI – Damon Moore 59-yard interception return (David Akers kick), 2:08. Eagles 31–9.

Top passers

- TB – Brad Johnson – 22/36, 202 yards, 4 INT
- PHI – Donovan McNabb – 16/25, 194 yards, 2 TD, INT

Top rushers

- TB – Mike Alstott – 12 rushes, 32 yards
- PHI – Donovan McNabb – 4 rushes, 57 yards

Top receivers

- TB – Keyshawn Johnson – 3 receptions, 75 yards
- PHI – Todd Pinkston – 5 receptions, 62 yards

Eagles quarterback Donovan McNabb threw for 194 yards and two touchdowns, while also rushing for 54 yards, as Philadelphia dominated Tampa Bay from start to finish. Bucs quarterback Brad Johnson was intercepted four times, twice by Damon Moore. It was the second consecutive season in which Philadelphia eliminated Tampa Bay from the playoffs during the wild card round, and two days later, Buccaneers coach Tony Dungy was fired.

On the Eagles first drive of the game, Buccaneers safety Dexter Jackson intercepted a pass from McNabb and returned it nine yards to the Eagles 36-yard line, setting up a 36-yard field goal from Martín Gramática. But McNabb made up for his mistake with a 39-yard run on third down and 5 on Philadelphia's ensuing possession

==== NFC Divisional Playoffs: at (2) Chicago Bears ====
NFC Divisional Playoffs: (3) Philadelphia Eagles at (2) Chicago Bears – Game summary

Quarter	1	2	3	4	Total
Eagles	6	7	7	13	33
Bears	0	7	7	5	19

at Soldier Field, Chicago, Illinois

- Date: January 19, 2002
- Game time: 4:30 p.m. EST/3:30 p.m. CST
- Game weather: 31 °F (−1 °C), partly cloudy
- Game attendance: 65,028
- Referee: Bill Carollo
- TV announcers (Fox): Dick Stockton (play-by-play), Troy Aikman, Daryl Johnston (color commentators), and Pam Oliver (sideline reporter)

Game information

First quarter

- PHI – David Akers 34-yard field goal, 9:04. Eagles 3–0. Drive: 12 plays, 61 yards, 5:56.
- PHI – David Akers 23-yard field goal, 3:22. Eagles 6–0. Drive: 9 plays, 63 yards, 4:05.

Second quarter

- CHI – Ahmad Merritt 47-yard run (Paul Edinger kick), 5:29. Bears 7–6. Drive: 1 play, 62 yards, 0:15.
- PHI – Cecil Martin 13-yard pass from Donovan McNabb (David Akers kick), 0:14. Eagles 13–7. Drive: 11 plays, 69 yards, 5:15.

Third quarter

- CHI – Jerry Azumah 39-yard interception return (Paul Edinger kick), 12:25. Bears 14–13.
- PHI – Duce Staley 6-yard pass from Donovan McNabb (David Akers kick), 5:55. Eagles 20–14. Drive: 5 plays, 36 yards, 2:36.

Fourth quarter

- CHI – Paul Edinger 38-yard field goal, 14:16. Eagles 20–17. Drive: 11 plays, 44 yards, 6:39.
- PHI – David Akers 40-yard field goal, 8:48. Eagles 23–17. Drive: 11 plays, 45 yards, 5:28.
- PHI – David Akers 46-yard field goal, 6:28. Eagles 26–17. Drive: 4 plays, 7 yards, 2:07.
- PHI – Donovan McNabb 5-yard run (David Akers kick), 3:21. Eagles 33–17. Drive: 3 plays, 20 yards, 0:55.
- CHI – Safety, Sean Landeta ran out of end zone, 0:00. Eagles 33–19.

Top passers

- PHI – Donovan McNabb – 26/40, 262 yards, 2 TD, INT
- CHI – Shane Matthews – 8/17, 66 yards, 2 INT

Top rushers

- PHI – Duce Staley – 18 rushes, 66 yards
- CHI – Ahmad Merritt – 1 rush, 47 yards, TD

Top receivers

- PHI – James Thrash – 7 receptions, 73 yards
- CHI – Dez White – 4 receptions, 30 yards

The Bears surprised everyone by finishing atop the NFC Central with a 13–3 record behind quarterback Jim Miller. But after the Eagles jumped to a 6–0 lead, Miller was taken out of the game in the second quarter with a separated shoulder on a block by Hugh Douglas following Miller throwing an interception. Although Miller's replacement, Shane Matthews, led the Bears to a touchdown (a 47-yard reverse by Ahmad Merritt), and Jerry Azumah's 39-yard interception return briefly put the Bears back in the lead early in the second half, the Eagles controlled most of the rest of the game. Matthews threw for only 66 yards and was intercepted twice. Meanwhile, Eagles quarterback Donovan McNabb threw for 262 yards and two touchdowns, and ran for another touchdown.

==== NFC Championship: at (1) St. Louis Rams ====
NFC Championship: (3) Philadelphia Eagles at (1) St. Louis Rams – Game summary

Quarter	1	2	3	4	Total
Eagles	3	14	0	7	24
Rams	10	3	9	7	29

at Edward Jones Dome, St. Louis, Missouri

- Date: January 27, 2002
- Game time: 4:00 p.m. EST/3:00 p.m. CST
- Game weather: Played indoors, domed stadium
- Game attendance: 66,502
- Referee: Gerald Austin
- TV announcers (Fox): Pat Summerall (play-by-play), John Madden (color commentator), Ron Pitts, and Pam Oliver (sideline reporters)

Game information

First quarter

- STL – Isaac Bruce 5-yard pass from Kurt Warner (Jeff Wilkins kick), 12:00. Rams 7–0. Drive: 5 plays, 21 yards, 2:43.
- PHI – David Akers 46-yard field goal, 5:44. Rams 7–3. Drive: 11 plays, 45 yards, 6:16.
- STL – Jeff Wilkins 27-yard field goal, 1:06. Rams 10–3. Drive: 9 plays, 54 yards, 4:38.

Second quarter

- PHI – Duce Staley 1-yard run (David Akers kick), 6:56. Tied 10–10. Drive: 5 plays, 57 yards, 2:48.
- STL – Jeff Wilkins 39-yard field goal, 3:52. Rams 13–10. Drive: 7 plays, 45 yards, 3:04.
- PHI – Todd Pinkston 12-yard pass from Donovan McNabb (David Akers kick), 0:46. Eagles 17–13. Drive: 9 plays, 64 yards, 3:06.

Third quarter

- STL – Jeff Wilkins 41-yard field goal, 8:01. Eagles 17–16. Drive: 12 plays, 44 yards, 6:59.
- STL – Marshall Faulk 1-yard run (pass failed), 1:18. Rams 22–17. Drive: 10 plays, 71 yards, 5:38.

Fourth quarter

- STL – Marshall Faulk 1-yard run (Jeff Wilkins kick), 6:55. Rams 29–17. Drive: 7 plays, 56 yards, 4:27.
- PHI – Donovan McNabb 3-yard run (David Akers kick), 2:56. Rams 29–24. Drive: 9 plays, 52 yards, 3:59.

Top passers

- PHI – Donovan McNabb – 18/30, 171 yards, TD, INT
- STL – Kurt Warner – 22/33, 212 yards, TD

Top rushers

- PHI – Correll Buckhalter – 6 rushes, 50 yards
- STL – Marshall Faulk – 31 rushes, 159 yards, 2 TD

Top receivers

- PHI – Duce Staley – 8 receptions, 58 yards
- STL – Isaac Bruce – 8 receptions, 84 yards, TD

The Eagles had a 17–13 lead at halftime, and had not allowed more than 21 points per game during the season and playoffs. But the Rams roared back thanks to Kurt Warner completing two-thirds of his passes for 212 yards and Marshall Faulk's 159 yards rushing and two touchdowns to earn their second trip to the Super Bowl in three years.
