= Sheldon Brown (American football) =

American football player (born 1979)

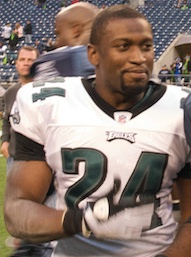
- Brown with the Philadelphia Eagles in 2008

No. 39, 24
- Position: Cornerback

Personal information
- Born: March 19, 1979 (age 47); Lancaster, South Carolina, U.S.
- Listed height: 5 ft 10 in (1.78 m)
- Listed weight: 200 lb (91 kg)

Career information
- High school: Lewisville (Richburg, South Carolina)
- College: South Carolina (1997–2001)
- NFL draft: 2002: 2nd round, 59th overall pick

Career history
- Philadelphia Eagles (2002–2009); Cleveland Browns (2010–2012)

Awards and highlights
- First-team All-American (2000); First-team All-SEC (2001)

Career NFL statistics
- Total tackles: 609
- Sacks: 8
- Forced fumbles: 9
- Pass deflections: 146
- Interceptions: 26
- Defensive touchdowns: 6
- Stats at Pro Football Reference

Sheldon Dion Brown (born March 19, 1979) is an American former professional football player who was a cornerback in the National Football League (NFL). He played college football for the South Carolina Gamecocks. Brown was selected by the Philadelphia Eagles in the second round of the 2002 NFL draft and also played for the Cleveland Browns.

== Early life ==
Brown grew up in Fort Lawn, South Carolina and attended Lewisville High School in Richburg, South Carolina, where he not only starred on defense, but was also a highly touted running back.

== College career ==
Brown played college football for the South Carolina Gamecocks. While majoring in Sports and Entertainment Management, he was a four-year player and three-year starter. A two-time All-SEC awardee in football, Brown also played baseball for South Carolina during his junior year.

== Professional career ==
=== Pre-draft ===
On January 26, 2002, Brown participated in the 2002 Senior Bowl and was part of the South team that was coached by Arizona Cardinals' head coach Dave McGinnis and defeated the North team 26–41 who was coached by Green Bay Packers' head coach Mike Holmgren. He attended the annual NFL Scouting Combine in Indianapolis and completed all of the combine and positional drills for scouts and team representatives in attendance. He performed well, finishing with the third best time in the 40-yard dash among all cornerbacks that year. United Press International had Brown ranked as the ninth best cornerback prospect available in the draft in 2002. NFL draft analysts and scouts projected Brown would be selected in the late second round of in the third round of the 2002 NFL Draft.

Pre-draft measurables
| Height | Weight | Arm length | Hand span | 40-yard dash | 10-yard split | 20-yard split | 20-yard shuttle | Three-cone drill | Vertical jump | Broad jump | Bench press |
|---|---|---|---|---|---|---|---|---|---|---|---|
| 5 ft 9 7/8 in (1.77 m) | 196 lb (89 kg) | 32 in (0.81 m) | 8 1/4 in (0.21 m) | 4.47 s | 1.54 s | 2.57 s | 4.24 s | 7.00 s | 36.5 in (0.93 m) | 10 ft 0 in (3.05 m) | 15 reps |
All values from NFL Combine

=== Philadelphia Eagles ===
The Philadelphia Eagles selected Brown in the second round (59th overall) of the 2002 NFL draft. The Eagles acquired the second round pick (59th overall) they used to acquire Brown in a trade with the Miami Dolphins in exchange for their third (88th overall) and sixth round (187th overall) picks in the 2002 NFL Draft. He was the fifth cornerback selected and the second cornerback the Eagles drafted in 2002, following their first round pick (26th overall) Lito Sheppard. ESPN draft analyst Mel Kiper Jr. considered the Eagles selection of Brown in the beginning of the second round a “reach”. This draft class is now considered to be the best draft class in the Philadelphia Eagles’ franchise history as Brown and Lito Sheppard were drafted alongside second round pick (58th overall) Michael Lewis and third round pick (91st overall) Brian Westbrook.

==== 2002 season ====
On July 26, 2002, the Philadelphia Eagles signed Brown to a five–year, $3.15 million rookie contract that included an initial signing bonus of $1.25 million. He entered training camp as a backup and was expected to remain on the bench throughout his rookie year to develop under their longtime starting veterans. He competed for the role as the starting nickelback against Al Harris under defensive coordinator Jim Johnson. Head coach Andy Reid named Brown a backup and listed him as the fifth cornerback on the depth chart to begin the season behind Troy Vincent, Bobby Taylor, Al Harris, and fellow rookie Lito Sheppard.

On September 8, 2002, Brown made his professional regular season debut in the Philadelphia Eagles’ season-opener at the Tennessee Titans and recorded one solo tackle as they lost 24–27. On September 22, 2002, Brown made three combined tackles (two solo), one pass deflection, and made his first career interception on a pass Quincy Carter threw to wide receiver Antonio Bryant as the Eagles defeated the Dallas Cowboys 13–44. In Week 12, he set a season-high with four combined tackles (three solo), made one pass deflection, and had his first career sack on Jeff Garcia for a nine–yard loss during a 38–17 victory at the San Francisco 49ers. He finished his rookie season with 22 combined tackles (17 solo), four pass deflections, two interceptions, and one sack in 16 games and zero starts. Both starting cornerbacks Troy Vincent and Bobby Taylor were named to the 2003 Pro Bowl.

The Philadelphia Eagles finished the 2002 NFL season first in the NFC East with a 12–4 record to earn a playoff berth.

==== 2003 season ====
On February 27, 2003, the Eagles traded cornerback Al Harris to the Green Bay Packers. Throughout training camp, Brown remained as a backup cornerback and continued to develop behind Pro Bowl cornerbacks Bobby Taylor and Troy Vincent. A contract holdout caused Bobby Taylor to miss the start of training camp. Head coach Andy Reid named Brown a backup and listed him as the fourth cornerback on the depth chart to begin the season, behind starting tandem Troy Vincent and Bobby Taylor and fellow second-year cornerback Lito Sheppard.

On September 8, 2003, Brown recorded two combined tackles (one solo) in the Eagles' 0–17 loss against the Tampa Bay Buccaneers in their home-opener. During the game, No. 2 starting cornerback Bobby Taylor suffered a foot injury that sidelined him for the next four games (Weeks 2–6). Brown was promoted to the third cornerback on the depth chart and the starting nickelback during his absence. In Week 3, he set a season-high with nine combined tackles (seven solo), made one pass deflection, and a sack during a 23–13 win at the Buffalo Bills. The following week, he earned his first career start as an outside cornerback in place of Troy Vincent who injured his hamstring and recorded three solo tackles and set a season-high with two pass deflections as the Eagles defeated the Washington Redskins 27–24 in Week 5. On December 7, 2003, Brown made one solo tackle, a pass deflection, and made his lone interception of the season on a pass Quincy Carter threw to Terry Glenn during a 10–36 victory against the Dallas Cowboys. He finished the 2003 NFL season with 48 combined tackles (41 solo), 11 pass deflections, one sack, a forced fumble, and one interception in 16 games and three starts.

The Philadelphia Eagles finished the 2003 NFL season first in the NFC East with a 12–4 record to earn a playoff berth and a first-round bye. On January 11, 2004, Brown started in his first career playoff game after Troy Vincent sustained a hip injury and recorded five solo tackles as the Eagles defeated the Green Bay Packers 20–17 in overtime to win the NFC Divisional Round. The following week, they lost in the NFC Championship Game 3–14 to the Carolina Panthers.

==== 2004 season ====
He entered training camp slated as a starting cornerback following the departure of Troy Vincent and Bobby Taylor during free agency. Head coach Andy Reid named Brown and Lito Sheppard the starting cornerbacks to begin the season. In Week 2, he recorded 13 combined tackles (nine solo) and set a new career-high with his second sack of the season during a 27–16 victory against the Minnesota Vikings.On November 4, 2004, the Philadelphia Eagles signed Brown to a six–year, $24 million contract that included a signing bonus of $7.50 million. The contract could be worth up to $30 million including incentives and bonuses and adds six–years onto the remaining two–years that still remained from his initial rookie contract. The contract runs throughout the 2012 NFL season.

In Week 9, he set a career-high with 14 combined tackles (seven solo) during a 3–27 loss at the Pittsburgh Steelers. On December 5, 2004, Brown recorded five combined tackles (four solo), set a season-high with four pass deflections, and intercepted a pass Brett Favre threw to Donald Driver as the Eagles routed the Green Bay Packers 17–47. In Week 15, Brown recorded five solo tackles, made two pass deflections, set a career-high with his third sack of the season, and intercepted a pass Vinny Testaverde threw to Keyshawn Johnson during a 7–12 victory against the Dallas Cowboys. He started in all 16 games throughout the 2004 NFL season and set a career-high with 89 combined tackles (66 solo), made 16 pass deflections, three sacks, a forced fumble, and two interceptions.

The Philadelphia Eagles finished first in the NFC East with a 13–3 record to clinch a first-round bye. In the Divisional Round, the Eagles defeated the Minnesota Vikings 27–14. He started in the NFC Championship Game and recorded two solo tackles and made three pass deflections during a 27–10 victory against the Atlanta Falcons. On February 6, 2005, Brown started in Super Bowl XXXIX and recorded two solo tackles and two pass deflections as the Eagles lost 21–24 to the New England Patriots.

==== 2005 season ====
Head coach Andy Reid named Brown the No. 2 starting cornerback to begin the season and kept him paired with Lito Sheppard. On October 2, 2005, Brian broke up two passes and set a career-high with two interceptions while returning the first interception for his first career touchdown during a 37–31 win at the Kansas City Chiefs. In the second quarter, the Eagles were being shutout by the Chiefs 0–17 when Brown had his first career pick-six on an interception Trent Green threw on an attempt to wide receiver Eddie Kennison and returned it 40–yards to score the first touchdown of his career to help spark a comeback victory. The following week, Brown set a season-high with seven solo tackles and had his second consecutive game with a touchdown during a 10–33 loss at the Dallas Cowboys in Week 5. During the fourth quarter, Drew Bledsoe threw a pass that was caught by wide receiver Keyshawn Johnson before Lito Sheppard forced a fumble by Johnson that Brown recovered and returned 80–yards for a touchdown. In Week 7, he set a season-high with nine combined tackles (five solo), made a pass deflection, and one sack during a 20–17 victory against the San Diego Chargers. In Week 11, No. 1 starting cornerback Lito Sheppard sprained his ankle after getting tied up with Plaxico Burress during a 17–27 loss at the New York Giants. Brown was paired with Roderick Hood for the last six games of the season due to Lito Sheppard’s absence.

In Week 12, he recorded two solo tackles and set a career-high with five pass deflections as the Eagles defeated the Green Bay Packers 14–19. He started in all 16 games throughout the 2005 NFL season and recorded 57 combined tackles (48 solo), four interceptions, a forced fumble, a fumble recovery, and one sack. He set career-highs in pass deflections (27) and defensive touchdowns (2). The Philadelphia Eagles finished the season with a disappointing 6–10 record, missing the playoffs.

==== 2006 season ====
He returned to training camp slated as the No. 2 starting cornerback under defensive coordinator Jim Johnson. Head coach Andy Reid retained him and Lito Sheppard as the starting cornerbacks to begin the season. In Week 4, he recorded two solo tackles and set a season-high with four pass deflections as the Eagles defeated the Green Bay Packers 30–9. On November 12, 2006, Brown made four combined tackles (three solo), two pass deflections, and returned an interception Mark Brunell threw while trying to attempt a pass to Santana Moss for a 70–yard touchdown during the fourth quarter of a 3–27 victory against the Washington Redskins. In Week 13, he set a season-high with nine combined tackles (six solo) and made a pass deflection as the Eagles defeated the Carolina Panthers 27–24. He started in all 16 games and recorded 52 combined tackles (37 solo), 11 pass deflections, one interception, and scored one touchdown.

The Philadelphia Eagles finished first in the NFC East with a 10–6 record during the 2006 NFL season to earn a playoff berth. On January 7, 2007, Brown started in the NFC Wild-Card Game and recorded two solo tackles, made three pass deflections, and intercepted a pass Eli Manning threw to wide receiver Plaxico Burress as the Eagles defeated the New York Giants 20–23. The following week, he made four solo tackles and broke up one pass during a 24–27 loss at the New Orleans Saints in the NFC Divisional Round.

==== 2007 season ====
He returned as the No. 2 starting cornerback alongside Lito Sheppard for the fourth consecutive season. On September 9, 2007, he set a season-high with seven solo tackles, made one pass deflection, and intercepted a pass Brett Favre threw to tight end Bubba Franks during a 13–16 loss at the Green Bay Packers. In Week 6, he recorded five solo tackles, set a season-high with three pass deflections, and intercepted Chad Pennington’s pass to wide receiver Brad Smith during a 16–9 victory at the New York Jets. He started in all 16 games for the fourth season in-a-row and recorded 68 combined tackles (61 solo), 14 pass deflections, and three interceptions.

==== 2008 season ====
The Philadelphia Eagles signed cornerback Asante Samuel as an unrestricted free agent. Defensive coordinator Jim Johnson stated Brown and Lito Sheppard would both start at right outside cornerback during training camp. Head coach Andy Reid named Brown the No. 2 starting cornerback to begin the season over Lito Sheppard.

On September 15, 2008, Brown set a season-high with eight solo tackles during a 37–41 loss at the Dallas Cowboys. In Week 17, Brown set a season-high with three pass deflections and had his lone interception of the season on a pass by Tony Romo as the Eagles defeated the Dallas Cowboys 6–44. He finished the 2008 NFL season with 51 combined tackles (42 solo), 12 pass deflections, one sack, and one interception in 16 games and 15 starts. The Eagles finished the 2008 NFL season with a 9–6–1 record, earning a playoff berth as a Wild-Card.

==== 2009 season ====
On February 28, 2009, the Philadelphia Eagles traded Lito Sheppard to the New Orleans Saints. Following the departure of Lito Sheppard, Brown demanded to be re-signed to a new contract, although he had received a contract extension in 2004 and had four years remaining throughout the 2012 NFL season. On April 20, 2009, Brown publicly demanded to be traded after the Eagles refused to negotiate a new contract. Later that day, the Philadelphia Eagles' Vice President Joe Banner released a formal statement replying to Brown's trade demand and outright refusing to entertain his requests. As a result, the Eagles traded the New England Patriots for cornerback Ellis Hobbs. Brown was pleased with the trade, hoping it would lead to his imminent departure. On July 28, 2009, the Philadelphia Eagles promoted Sean McDermott from secondary coach to defensive coordinator in place of Jim Johnson who died four days later. Sean McDermott retained Brown and Asante Samuel as the starting cornerbacks to begin the season.

On September 12, 2009, Brown recorded one solo tackle, two pass deflections, and tied his career-high of two interceptions on passes thrown by Jake Delhomme during a 38–10 victory at the Carolina Panthers. In Week 5, he recorded four combined tackles (three solo), set a season-high with three pass deflections, and intercepted a pass Josh Johnson threw to wide receiver Michael Clayton as the Eagles defeated the Tampa Bay Buccaneers 14–33. On December 6, 2007, Brown recorded three solo tackles, two pass deflections, and had a pick-six during a 34–6 win at the Atlanta Falcons. He intercepted backup quarterback Chris Redman’s pass to wide receiver Marty Booker and returned it 83–yards for a touchdown. In Week 14, Brown set a season-high with seven combined tackles (six solo) and set a new career-high with his second touchdown of the season after defensive end Trent Cole forced a fumble by running back Brandon Jacobs that was recovered by Brown and returned 60–yards for a touchdown during a 45–38 victory at the New York Giants. He started in all 16 games throughout the 2009 NFL season and recorded 51 combined tackles (43 solo), 17 pass deflections, a forced fumble, and a fumble recovery. He set a career-high in interceptions (5) and touchdowns (2).

=== Cleveland Browns ===
==== 2010 season ====
On April 2, 2010, the Philadelphia Eagles traded Brown and linebacker Chris Gocong to the Cleveland Browns in exchange linebacker Alex Hall and a fourth (105th overall) and fifth-round pick (137th overall) in the 2010 NFL draft. The Browns selected cornerback Joe Haden in the first-round (7th overall) of the 2010 NFL Draft. He entered training camp as a candidate to be the No. 2 starting cornerback following the departure of Brandon McDonald. Throughout training camp, he competed against rookie Joe Haden. Head coach Eric Mangini named Brown the No. 2 starting cornerback to begin the season and paired him with Eric Wright.

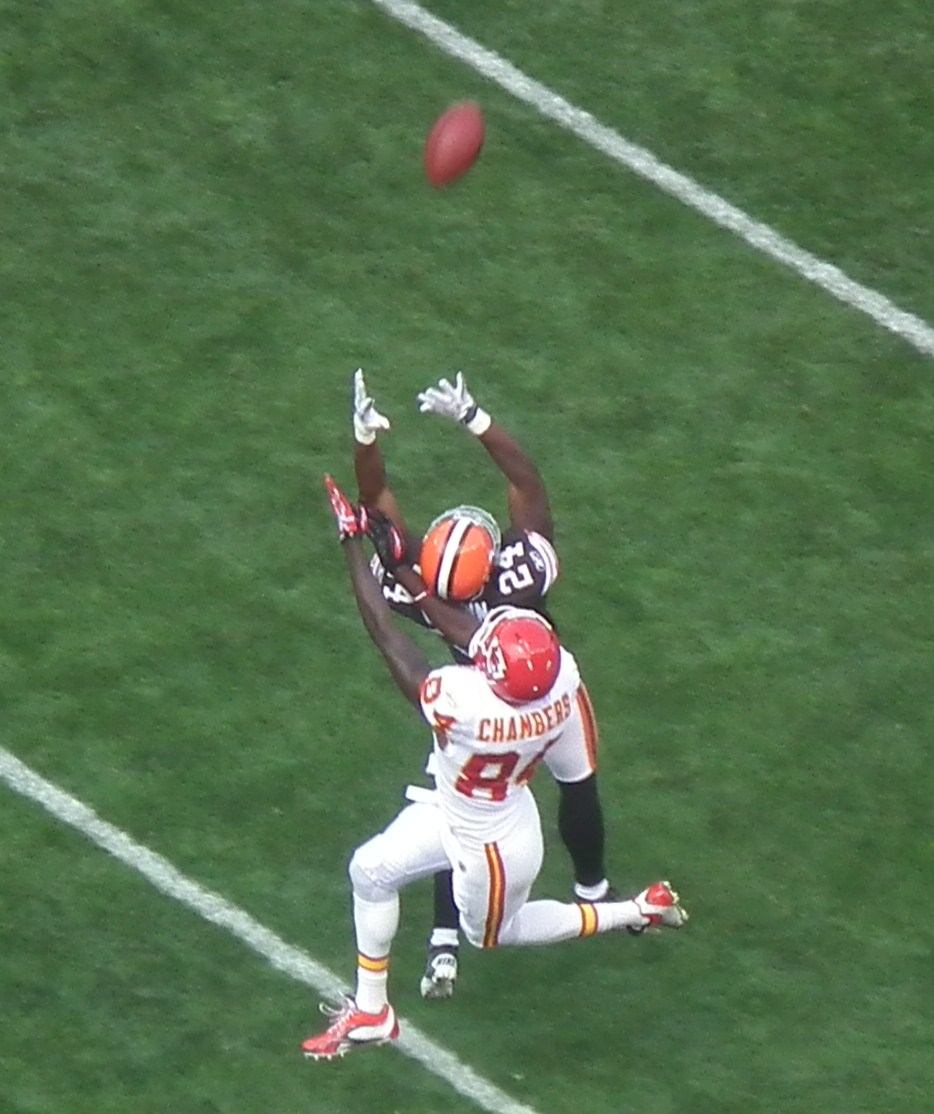
Brown intercepting a pass against the Kansas City Chiefs in 2010

On October 24, 2010, Brown made seven combined tackles (six solo), one pass deflection, and intercepted a pass Drew Brees threw to Robert Meachem during a 30–17 victory at the New Orleans Saints. In Week 11, he recorded one solo tackle and set a season-high with two pass deflections during a 20–24 loss at the Jacksonville Jaguars. The following week, Brown set a season-high with ten combined tackles (eight solo) and had one pass break-up as the Browns defeated the Carolina Panthers 24–23 in Week 12. He started in all 16 games and recorded 63 combined tackles (51 solo), 10 pass deflections, and two interceptions.

==== 2011 season ====
Defensive coordinator Dick Jauron named Brown the No. 1 starting cornerback to begin the season following the departure of Eric Wright and paired him with Joe Haden. In Week 3, he set a season-high with seven combined tackles (six solo) during a 17–16 win against the Miami Dolphins. In Week 7, he recorded one pass deflection and intercepted a pass Charlie Whitehurst to wide receiver Sidney Rice as the Browns defeated the Seattle Seahawks 6–3. On December 24, 2011, Brown made three combined tackles (two solo), set a season-high with two pass deflections, and intercepted a pass Joe Flacco threw to Lee Evans during a 14–30 loss at the Baltimore Ravens. He started in all 16 games throughout the 2011 NFL season and recorded 48 combined tackles (38 solo), 12 pass deflections, two interceptions, one forced fumble, and a fumble recovery.

==== 2012 season ====
He returned as the No. 2 starting cornerback and was paired with Joe Haden to begin the season. On October 14, 2012, Brown made four combined tackles (three solo), three pass deflections, and had a pick-six as the Browns defeated the Cincinnati Bengals 24–34. He intercepted a pass Andy Dalton threw to wide receiver Brandon Tate and returned it for a 19–yard touchdown. The following week, he set a season-high with ten combined tackles (nine solo) and forced a fumble by Andrew Luck on a five–yard sack and recovered it in the fourth quarter of a 13–17 loss at the Indianapolis Colts in Week 7. On December 2, 2012, Brown recorded five solo tackles, set a season-high with four pass deflections, and had his last interception of his career during a 20–17 victory at the Oakland Raiders. He intercepted a pass Carson Palmer threw to wide receiver Juron Criner in the fourth quarter as the Browns led 13–10. In Week 16, Brown recorded two solo tackles before he exited during the second quarter of a 12–34 loss at the Denver Broncos after suffering a concussion in a collision with wide receiver Brandon Stokley., He subsequently remained in concussion protocol and was inactive as the Browns lost 10–24 at the Pittsburgh Steelers. He finished his last season in 2012 with a total of 60 combined tackles (53 solo), 12 pass deflections, three interceptions, two fumble recoveries, one forced fumble, and scored a touchdown in 15 games and 14 starts.

== NFL career statistics ==
Legend
| | Led the league |
| **Bold** | Career high |

=== Regular season ===
| Year | Team | Games | | Tackles | | | | | Interceptions | | | | | Fumbles | | | |
| Year | Team | GP | GS | Cmb | Solo | Ast | Sck | TFL | Int | Yds | TD | Lng | PD | FF | FR | Yds | TD |
|---|---|---|---|---|---|---|---|---|---|---|---|---|---|---|---|---|---|
| 2002 | PHI | **16** | 0 | 22 | 17 | 5 | 1.0 | 2 | 2 | 41 | 0 | 29 | 4 | **1** | 0 | 0 | 0 |
| 2003 | PHI | **16** | 3 | 48 | 41 | 7 | 1.0 | 3 | 1 | 10 | 0 | 10 | 11 | **1** | 0 | 0 | 0 |
| 2004 | PHI | **16** | **16** | **89** | **66** | **23** | **3.0** | **4** | 2 | 33 | 0 | 33 | 16 | **1** | 0 | 0 | 0 |
| 2005 | PHI | **16** | **16** | 57 | 48 | 9 | 1.0 | 2 | 4 | 67 | **1** | 40 | **27** | **1** | 1 | **80** | **1** |
| 2006 | PHI | **16** | **16** | 52 | 37 | 15 | 0.0 | 3 | 1 | 70 | **1** | 70 | 11 | 0 | 0 | 0 | 0 |
| 2007 | PHI | **16** | **16** | 68 | 61 | 7 | 0.0 | 1 | 3 | 3 | 0 | 3 | 14 | **1** | 0 | 0 | 0 |
| 2008 | PHI | **16** | 15 | 51 | 42 | 9 | 1.0 | 2 | 1 | 23 | 0 | 23 | 12 | **1** | 0 | 0 | 0 |
| 2009 | PHI | **16** | **16** | 51 | 43 | 8 | 0.0 | 2 | **5** | **152** | **1** | **83** | 17 | **1** | 1 | 60 | **1** |
| 2010 | CLE | **16** | **16** | 63 | 51 | 12 | 0.0 | 1 | 2 | 0 | 0 | 0 | 10 | 0 | 0 | 0 | 0 |
| 2011 | CLE | **16** | **16** | 48 | 38 | 10 | 0.0 | 0 | 2 | 0 | 0 | 0 | 12 | **1** | 1 | 0 | 0 |
| 2012 | CLE | 15 | 14 | 60 | 53 | 7 | 1.0 | 3 | 3 | 20 | **1** | 19 | 12 | **1** | **2** | 0 | 0 |
| Career | | 175 | 144 | 609 | 497 | 112 | 8.0 | 23 | 26 | 419 | 4 | 83 | 146 | 9 | 5 | 140 | 2 |

=== Playoffs ===
| Year | Team | Games | | Tackles | | | | | Interceptions | | | | | Fumbles | | | |
| Year | Team | GP | GS | Cmb | Solo | Ast | Sck | TFL | Int | Yds | TD | Lng | PD | FF | FR | Yds | TD |
|---|---|---|---|---|---|---|---|---|---|---|---|---|---|---|---|---|---|
| 2002 | PHI | 2 | 0 | 1 | 1 | 0 | 0.0 | 0 | 0 | 0 | 0 | 0 | 0 | 0 | 0 | 0 | 0 |
| 2003 | PHI | 2 | 1 | 5 | 5 | 0 | 0.0 | **1** | 0 | 0 | 0 | 0 | 0 | 0 | 0 | 0 | 0 |
| 2004 | PHI | **3** | **3** | 4 | 4 | 0 | 0.0 | 0 | 0 | 0 | 0 | 0 | **5** | 0 | 0 | 0 | 0 |
| 2006 | PHI | 2 | 2 | **6** | **6** | 0 | 0.0 | 0 | **1** | **7** | 0 | **7** | 4 | 0 | 0 | 0 | 0 |
| 2008 | PHI | **3** | **3** | **6** | 4 | **2** | 0.0 | 0 | 0 | 0 | 0 | 0 | 2 | 0 | 0 | 0 | 0 |
| 2009 | PHI | 1 | 1 | **6** | **6** | 0 | 0.0 | 0 | 0 | 0 | 0 | 0 | 0 | 0 | 0 | 0 | 0 |
| Career | | 13 | 10 | 28 | 26 | 2 | 0.0 | 1 | 1 | 7 | 0 | 7 | 11 | 0 | 0 | 0 | 0 |

== Personal ==
Brown resided in Marlton, New Jersey and Lake Wylie, South Carolina during his tenure with the Eagles.

In 2008, Brown was named the recipient of the Philadelphia Sports Writers Association "Good Guy" Award.
