= Derrick Burgess =

American football player (born 1978)

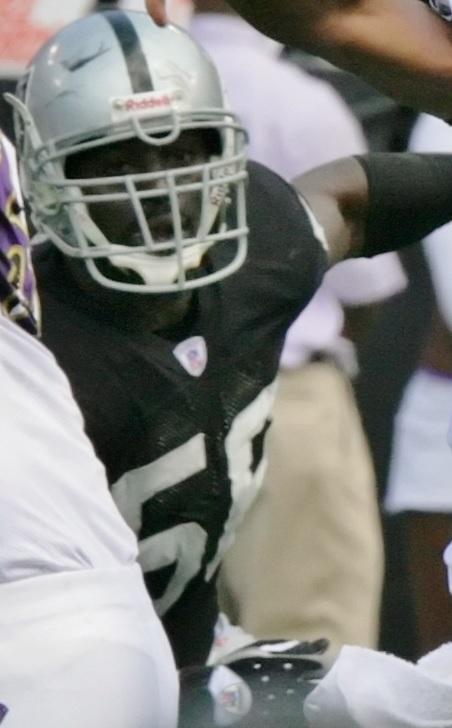
- Burgess with the Oakland Raiders in 2006

No. 59, 56, 55, 73
- Position: Defensive end

Personal information
- Born: August 12, 1978 (age 48); Lake City, South Carolina, U.S.
- Listed height: 6 ft 2 in (1.88 m)
- Listed weight: 255 lb (116 kg)

Career information
- College: Ole Miss
- NFL draft: 2001: 3rd round, 63rd overall pick

Career history
- Philadelphia Eagles (2001–2004); Oakland Raiders (2005–2008); New England Patriots (2009); Philadelphia Eagles (2010)

Awards and highlights
- Second-team All-Pro (2005); 2× Pro Bowl (2005, 2006); NFL sacks leader (2005); First-team All-SEC (2000)

Career NFL statistics
- Total tackles: 266
- Sacks: 52
- Forced fumbles: 6
- Fumble recoveries: 5
- Pass deflections: 7
- Stats at Pro Football Reference

Derrick Lee Burgess (born August 12, 1978) is an American former professional football player who was a defensive end in the National Football League (NFL) for 10 seasons, primarily with the Philadelphia Eagles and Oakland Raiders. He was selected by the Eagles in the third round of the 2001 NFL draft where he spent four seasons before joining Oakland. During his four seasons with the Raiders, he twice received Pro Bowl honors and led the league in sacks in 2005. After one season with the New England Patriots, Burgess rejoined the Eagles for his final season in 2010.

== Early life ==
Burgess attended Eleanor Roosevelt High School in Greenbelt, Maryland, where he played football and basketball. As a senior, Burgess recorded 102 tackles and four sacks and was an all-state selection at outside linebacker.

== College career ==
After graduating from high school, Burgess attended the University of Mississippi, where he led his team as a senior in 2000 with 9.5 sacks. He was also named to the first-team All-SEC that season.

== Professional career ==
=== Philadelphia Eagles (first stint) ===
Burgess was drafted in the third round (63rd overall) by the Philadelphia Eagles in the 2001 NFL draft. He appeared in all 16 games as a rookie and had six sacks. In 2002, however, he broke his foot in the first game of the season and missed the rest of the year. He then missed all of 2003 due to a torn Achilles tendon.

He returned healthy in 2004 and started 12 regular season games for the Eagles, recording 2.5 sacks. He had more success in the postseason, where he recorded three quarterback sacks, including the Eagles' only sack in Super Bowl XXXIX against the New England Patriots.

=== Oakland Raiders ===
Burgess was signed by the Oakland Raiders prior to the 2005 season, and was originally slated to be a backup. By the middle of the season, he worked his way into the lineup thanks to his success as a pass rusher; most notably, he had six quarterback sacks over a three-game span. He became particularly successful at the end of the season and recorded nine over the final seven games of the year; the last sack would break Sean Jones' team record for sacks in a single season. His 16 sacks overall led the NFL and earned him his first Pro Bowl bid. Burgess finished the 2006 season with 11 sacks and earned a second Pro Bowl bid. Even though Burgess dealt with a nagging calf injury all year, he finished 2007 with eight sacks and 40 tackles.

On December 23, 2007, Burgess and teammate Warren Sapp were involved in an altercation with NFL referees near the end of the second quarter of the Raiders' game at Jacksonville. The incident began when linesman Jerry Bergman mistakenly assumed that the Raiders wished to decline a Jacksonville ten-yard penalty. Sapp, the defensive captain, began speaking with referee Jerome Boger, indicating that the Raiders instead wished to accept the penalty. The conversation became heated, with Sapp gesturing and swearing. This resulted in an unsportsmanlike conduct call by Boger against Sapp. Sapp and his defensive teammates continued interacting with the officials after the penalty was called, resulting in a second unsportsmanlike conduct penalty against Sapp and another unsportsmanlike conduct penalty assessed against Burgess. Finally, the coaches and officiating staff entered the field and began physically separating and removing the arguing players. Boger claimed that during this time Sapp "bumped" him; Sapp denies making physical contact. Regardless, at this point Boger levied a third unsportsmanlike conduct penalty against Sapp and ejected him from the game. Sapp did not play in the second half and was eventually fined $75,000 by the NFL; Burgess received a $25,000 fine.

Burgess played in and started 10 games for the Raiders in 2008, recording 3.5 sacks. Entering the final year of his contract, Burgess failed to report to the team's training camp in August 2009 and was placed on the "did not report" list. He was traded to the New England Patriots on August 6.

=== New England Patriots ===
On August 6, 2009, the Patriots traded their original third- and fourth-round selections in the 2010 NFL draft to the Raiders in exchange for Burgess. The trade was made on the condition that, because the Patriots had already traded their fifth-round selection, the fourth-round selection sent to Oakland would become a fifth-round selection once the Patriots re-acquired one. Later that month, the Patriots traded defensive lineman Le Kevin Smith to the Denver Broncos along with a seventh-round pick (acquired from the Philadelphia Eagles) to the Denver Broncos in exchange for the Broncos' fifth-round pick, which was sent to Oakland for the Patriots' original fourth-round pick.

Burgess played in all 16 games for the Patriots in 2009, starting six. He finished the season with 35 tackles and five sacks. He became an unrestricted free agent following the season and was re-signed by the Patriots on May 14, 2010. However, Burgess did not report to Patriots training camp, and was placed on the Reserve/Did Not Report list on July 29, 2010. He was reinstated to the active roster on August 13, the day after the Patriots' first preseason game. He was released during final cuts on September 4, 2010.

=== Philadelphia Eagles (second stint) ===
Burgess was re-signed to a two-year contract by the Philadelphia Eagles on December 14, 2010. He played in a week 16 game against the Minnesota Vikings on December 28. He was released on December 30.

== NFL career statistics ==
Legend
	Led the league
**Bold**	Career high

=== Regular season ===
Year	Team	Games		Tackles					Interceptions					Fumbles			
Year	Team	GP	GS	Cmb	Solo	Ast	Sck	TFL	Int	Yds	TD	Lng	PD	FF	FR	Yds	TD
2001	PHI	**16**	4	32	25	7	6.0	11	0	0	0	0	0	0	1	0	0
2002	PHI	1	0	1	1	0	0.0	0	0	0	0	0	0	0	0	0	0
2004	PHI	12	11	24	19	5	2.5	4	0	0	0	0	**4**	0	0	0	0
2005	OAK	**16**	12	**58**	**52**	6	**16.0**	**13**	0	0	0	0	0	**3**	**2**	0	0
2006	OAK	**16**	**16**	51	43	8	11.0	10	0	0	0	0	1	1	0	0	0
2007	OAK	14	14	41	32	**9**	8.0	11	0	0	0	0	1	0	1	0	0
2008	OAK	10	10	25	16	**9**	3.5	5	0	0	0	0	1	1	0	0	0
2009	NWE	**16**	6	34	27	7	5.0	4	0	0	0	0	0	1	1	0	0
2010	PHI	1	0	0	0	0	0.0	0	0	0	0	0	0	0	0	0	0
		102	73	266	215	51	52.0	58	0	0	0	0	7	6	5	0	0

=== Playoffs ===
Year	Team	Games		Tackles					Interceptions					Fumbles			
Year	Team	GP	GS	Cmb	Solo	Ast	Sck	TFL	Int	Yds	TD	Lng	PD	FF	FR	Yds	TD
2001	PHI	**3**	0	3	3	0	1.0	0	0	0	0	0	**1**	**1**	0	0	0
2004	PHI	**3**	**3**	6	6	0	**3.0**	**2**	0	0	0	0	**1**	0	0	0	0
2009	NWE	1	0	**9**	**8**	**1**	0.0	1	0	0	0	0	0	0	0	0	0
		7	3	18	17	1	4.0	3	0	0	0	0	2	1	0	0	0
