= Cecil Martin =

American football player (born 1975)

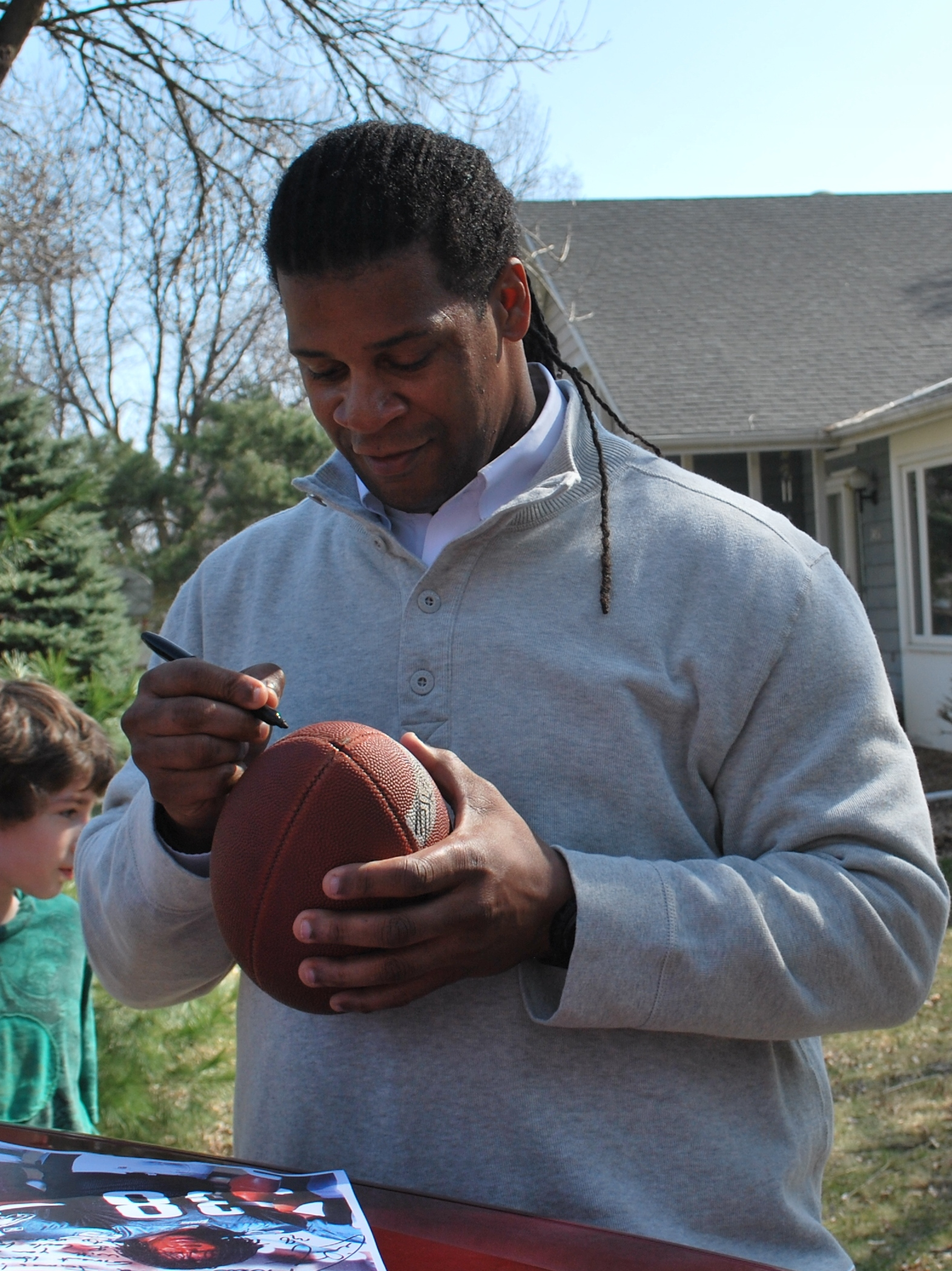
- Martin in 2012

No. 38, 37
- Position: Fullback

Personal information
- Born: July 8, 1975 (age 51); Chicago, Illinois, U.S.
- Listed height: 6 ft 0 in (1.83 m)
- Listed weight: 235 lb (107 kg)

Career information
- High school: Evanston (Evanston, Illinois)
- College: Wisconsin
- NFL draft: 1999: 6th round, 172nd overall pick

Career history
- Philadelphia Eagles (1999–2002); Oakland Raiders (2003)*; Tampa Bay Buccaneers (2003)
- * Offseason or practice squad member only

Career NFL statistics
- Rushing yards: 103
- Rushing average: 4
- Receptions: 81
- Receiving yards: 491
- Receiving touchdowns: 2
- Stats at Pro Football Reference

Danyel Cecil Martin (born July 8, 1975) is an American former professional football player who was a fullback in the National Football League (NFL). He played college football for the Wisconsin Badgers.

== Early life ==
Martin was born in Chicago, Illinois, on July 8, 1975. He attended Evanston Township High School in Illinois before going on to play college football at the University of Wisconsin–Madison for the Wisconsin Badgers between 1995 and 1999, appearing in the 1996 Copper Bowl, 1998 Outback Bowl and 1999 Rose Bowl, winning in 1996 and 1999. Martin is also a brother of Phi Beta Sigma fraternity.

== Professional career ==
He was selected in the sixth round of the 1999 NFL draft by the Philadelphia Eagles. Martin soon became a starter for the Eagles. Martin's two career touchdowns came in the same game, twice receiving from Donovan McNabb in a 17-20 loss against the St. Louis Rams during the 2001 season. Cecil left the Eagles at the end of the 2002 season. Martin was an ever-present in the Eagles 2000, 2001 and 2002 campaigns, all three ending in the team qualifying for the playoffs. In the 2003 off season, Martin signed on the practice team for the Oakland Raiders. He was later cut and picked up by the Tampa Bay Buccaneers, for whom he appeared in one game in 2003, a 13-33 loss to the Tennessee Titans in week 16. Martin retired from professional football having played 61 regular season and 7 post season games across his 5 seasons in the game.

== Retirement ==
Currently, Martin works with high school student-athletes across the country educating them on the college recruiting process as an Educational Speaker for the National Collegiate Scouting Association. Martin also often appears on Sky Sports in the United Kingdom as a studio analyst for their NFL programming.

Throughout 2013 and 2014, Martin toured the United Kingdom's American football teams to help promote and grow the sport in the country.

Martin suffers from Bell's palsy, which affects the left side of his face.
