= Carlos Emmons (American football) =

American football player (born 1973)

No. 51
- Position: Linebacker

Personal information
- Born: September 3, 1973 (age 53); Greenwood, Mississippi, U.S.
- Listed height: 6 ft 5 in (1.96 m)
- Listed weight: 245 lb (111 kg)

Career information
- High school: Greenwood
- College: Arkansas State
- NFL draft: 1996: 7th round, 242nd overall pick

Career history
- Pittsburgh Steelers (1996–1999); Philadelphia Eagles (2000–2003); New York Giants (2004–2006)

Career NFL statistics
- Total tackles: 648
- Sacks: 19
- Forced fumbles: 6
- Fumble recoveries: 8
- Interceptions: 5
- Defensive touchdowns: 1
- Stats at Pro Football Reference

Carlos Antoine Emmons (born September 3, 1973) is an American former professional football player who was a linebacker in the National Football League (NFL). He played college football for the Arkansas State Red Wolves. Emmons is President/CEO of Emmons, LLC. and owned restaurants/bars called Wet Willie's and B51 in Atlanta, GA.

== Biography ==
Emmons started playing football in seventh grade as an offensive lineman before moving to wide receiver in eighth grade. He attended Greenwood High School and played defensive back and linebacker. After high school, he played college football at Arkansas State University, where he was a four-year starter and received his BS in Business Management in December 1995. He earned second-team All-Big West Conference honors following his senior season, when he had 63 tackles, including four sacks.

Emmons was selected in the seventh round of the 1996 NFL draft (242nd overall) by the Pittsburgh Steelers and played for the Steelers until 1999. In 2000, he began playing with the Philadelphia Eagles and was named team Defensive MVP in his final year. He signed as a free agent by the New York Giants in March 2004 and was released by them on February 12, 2007, after having career-ending back surgery.

== NFL career statistics ==
Legend
| | Led the league |
| **Bold** | Career high |

=== Regular season ===
| Year | Team | Games | | Tackles | | | | Interceptions | | | | Fumbles | | | |
| Year | Team | GP | GS | Comb | Solo | Ast | Sck | Int | Yds | TD | Lng | FF | FR | Yds | TD |
|---|---|---|---|---|---|---|---|---|---|---|---|---|---|---|---|
| 1996 | PIT | 15 | 0 | 7 | 5 | 2 | 2.5 | 0 | 0 | 0 | 0 | 1 | 1 | 0 | 0 |
| 1997 | PIT | 5 | 0 | 1 | 1 | 0 | 0.0 | 0 | 0 | 0 | 0 | 0 | 0 | 0 | 0 |
| 1998 | PIT | 15 | 14 | 63 | 46 | 17 | 3.5 | 1 | 2 | 0 | 2 | **2** | 1 | 0 | 0 |
| 1999 | PIT | 16 | 16 | 67 | 51 | 16 | **6.0** | 1 | **22** | 0 | **22** | 1 | **3** | 2 | 0 |
| 2000 | PHI | 16 | 13 | 78 | 55 | 23 | 0.5 | **2** | 8 | 0 | 8 | 1 | 1 | 2 | 0 |
| 2001 | PHI | 16 | 15 | 79 | 61 | 18 | 1.0 | 0 | 0 | 0 | 0 | 0 | 0 | 0 | 0 |
| 2002 | PHI | 13 | 13 | 60 | 51 | 9 | 3.5 | 0 | 0 | 0 | 0 | 0 | 1 | **44** | **1** |
| 2003 | PHI | 15 | 15 | 85 | **65** | 20 | 0.0 | 0 | 0 | 0 | 0 | 1 | 1 | 0 | 0 |
| 2004 | NYG | 15 | 15 | **97** | 62 | **35** | 1.0 | 0 | 0 | 0 | 0 | 0 | 0 | 0 | 0 |
| 2005 | NYG | 9 | 8 | 49 | 35 | 14 | 0.0 | 1 | 6 | 0 | 6 | 0 | 0 | 0 | 0 |
| 2006 | NYG | 12 | 12 | 62 | 49 | 13 | 1.0 | 0 | 0 | 0 | 0 | 0 | 0 | 0 | 0 |
| | | 147 | 121 | 648 | 481 | 167 | 19.0 | 5 | 38 | 0 | 22 | 6 | 8 | 48 | 1 |

=== Playoffs ===
| Year | Team | Games | | Tackles | | | | Interceptions | | | | Fumbles | | | |
| Year | Team | GP | GS | Comb | Solo | Ast | Sck | Int | Yds | TD | Lng | FF | FR | Yds | TD |
|---|---|---|---|---|---|---|---|---|---|---|---|---|---|---|---|
| 1996 | PIT | 1 | 0 | 0 | 0 | 0 | 0.0 | 0 | 0 | 0 | 0 | 0 | 0 | 0 | 0 |
| 1997 | PIT | 2 | 0 | 0 | 0 | 0 | 0.0 | 0 | 0 | 0 | 0 | 0 | 0 | 0 | 0 |
| 2000 | PHI | 2 | 2 | **15** | 7 | **8** | 0.0 | 0 | 0 | 0 | 0 | 0 | 0 | 0 | 0 |
| 2001 | PHI | 3 | 3 | 11 | **8** | 3 | 0.0 | **1** | 0 | 0 | 0 | 0 | 0 | 0 | 0 |
| 2002 | PHI | 2 | 2 | 7 | 6 | 1 | 0.0 | 0 | 0 | 0 | 0 | 0 | 0 | 0 | 0 |
| 2006 | NYG | 1 | 1 | 0 | 0 | 0 | 0.0 | 0 | 0 | 0 | 0 | 0 | 0 | 0 | 0 |
| | | 11 | 8 | 33 | 21 | 12 | 0.0 | 1 | 0 | 0 | 0 | 0 | 0 | 0 | 0 |
