= Paul Grasmanis =

American football player (born 1974)

No. 93, 95, 96
- Position: Defensive tackle

Personal information
- Born: August 2, 1974 (age 52); Grand Rapids, Michigan, U.S.
- Listed height: 6 ft 3 in (1.91 m)
- Listed weight: 298 lb (135 kg)

Career information
- High school: Jenison (Jenison, Michigan)
- College: Notre Dame
- NFL draft: 1996: 4th round, 116th overall pick

Career history
- Chicago Bears (1996–1998); St. Louis Rams (1999)*; Denver Broncos (1999); Philadelphia Eagles (2000–2005)
- * Offseason or practice squad member only

Career NFL statistics
- Total tackles: 151
- Sacks: 12
- Fumble recoveries: 1
- Stats at Pro Football Reference

Paul Ryan Grasmanis (born August 2, 1974) is an American former professional football player who was a defensive lineman in the National Football League (NFL). He played college football for the Notre Dame Fighting Irish.

Raised in Jenison, Michigan, he was a ten-year veteran of the NFL and was selected in the fourth round of the 1996 NFL draft by the Chicago Bears. Paul was also a standout defensive tackle during his career at the University of Notre Dame.

In 1999, he spent one week with the St. Louis Rams and was dropped and picked up by the Denver Broncos. He signed onto the Eagles in 2000, and retired prior to the 2006 season due to his persistent injuries.

== NFL career statistics ==
Legend
**Bold**	Career high

=== Regular season ===
Year	Team	Games		Tackles				Interceptions				Fumbles			
Year	Team	GP	GS	Comb	Solo	Ast	Sck	Int	Yds	TD	Lng	FF	FR	Yds	TD
1996	CHI	14	3	11	8	3	0.0	0	0	0	0	0	0	0	0
1997	CHI	16	1	14	9	5	0.5	0	0	0	0	0	**1**	0	0
1998	CHI	15	0	17	15	2	1.0	0	0	0	0	0	0	0	0
1999	DEN	5	0	7	5	2	0.0	0	0	0	0	0	0	0	0
2000	PHI	16	0	**35**	**30**	5	3.5	0	0	0	0	0	0	0	0
2001	PHI	14	2	19	14	5	2.0	0	0	0	0	0	0	0	0
2002	PHI	16	3	31	20	**11**	**4.0**	0	0	0	0	0	0	0	0
2003	PHI	2	0	6	4	2	1.0	0	0	0	0	0	0	0	0
2004	PHI	4	0	10	10	0	0.0	0	0	0	0	0	0	0	0
2005	PHI	2	0	1	1	0	0.0	0	0	0	0	0	0	0	0
Career		104	9	151	116	35	12.0	0	0	0	0	0	1	0	0

=== Playoffs ===
Year	Team	Games		Tackles				Interceptions				Fumbles			
Year	Team	GP	GS	Comb	Solo	Ast	Sck	Int	Yds	TD	Lng	FF	FR	Yds	TD
2000	PHI	2	0	3	2	1	0.0	0	0	0	0	0	0	0	0
2001	PHI	3	3	**8**	**5**	**3**	0.0	0	0	0	0	0	0	0	0
2002	PHI	2	0	2	1	1	0.0	0	0	0	0	0	0	0	0
Career		7	3	13	8	5	0.0	0	0	0	0	0	0	0	0
