= A. J. Feeley =

American football player (born 1977)

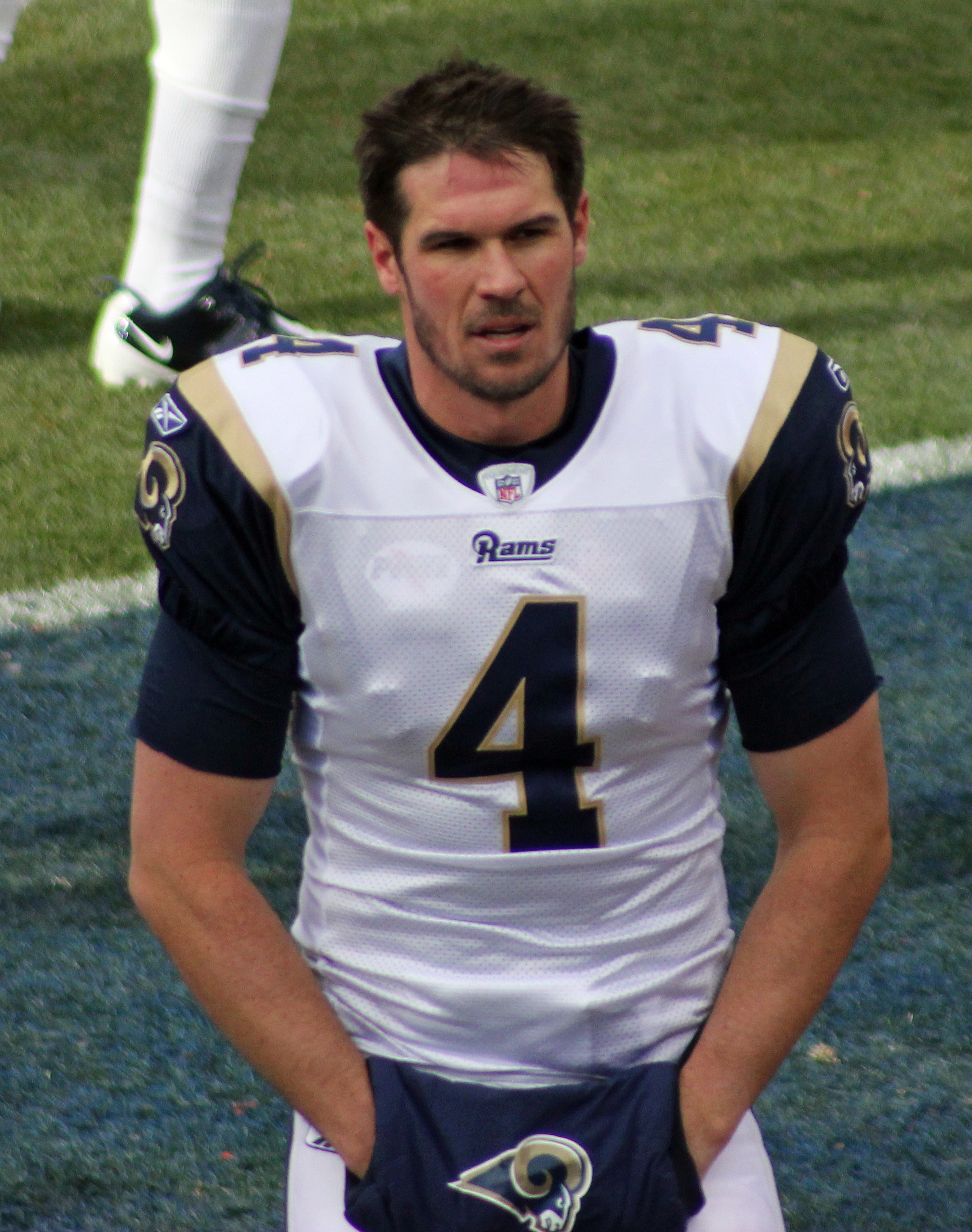
- Feeley with the St. Louis Rams in 2010

No. 14, 7, 4
- Position: Quarterback

Personal information
- Born: May 16, 1977 (age 49); Caldwell, Idaho, U.S.
- Listed height: 6 ft 3 in (1.91 m)
- Listed weight: 216 lb (98 kg)

Career information
- High school: Ontario (Ontario, Oregon)
- College: Oregon (1996–2000)
- NFL draft: 2001: 5th round, 155th overall pick

Career history
- Philadelphia Eagles (2001–2003); Miami Dolphins (2004–2005); San Diego Chargers (2005); Philadelphia Eagles (2006–2008); Carolina Panthers (2009); St. Louis Rams (2010–2011)

Career NFL statistics
- Passing attempts: 968
- Passing completions: 425
- Completion percentage: 55.8%
- TD–INT: 28–31
- Passing yards: 4,618
- Passer rating: 69.1
- Stats at Pro Football Reference

Adam Joshua Feeley (born May 16, 1977) is an American former professional football player who was a quarterback in the National Football League (NFL). He played college football for the Oregon Ducks and was selected by the Philadelphia Eagles in the fifth round of the 2001 NFL draft. He played in the NFL for the Miami Dolphins and St. Louis Rams, as well as his two stints with the Eagles.

== Early life ==
Feeley was born in Caldwell, Idaho. He played high school football at Ontario High School as a quarterback in Ontario, Oregon. In four years, he passed for 5,428 yards and 59 touchdowns. In addition to football, he played baseball and basketball. He opted, however, to play college football for the Oregon Ducks.

== College career ==
Feeley was a four-year letterman at Oregon, and saw most of his playing time in his sophomore and junior years. He was a nominee for the Davey O'Brien Award as a junior, throwing for 1,951 yards and 14 touchdowns before being sidelined with an elbow injury. However, during most of his senior year, he was a backup to starter Joey Harrington, who was drafted third overall by the Detroit Lions in 2002.

== Professional career ==
Pre-draft measurables
Height	Weight	40-yard dash	20-yard shuttle	Vertical jump
6 ft 3 1/8 in (1.91 m)	217 lb (98 kg)	5.13 s	4.16 s	26.0 in (0.66 m)
All values from Pro Day

=== Philadelphia Eagles (first stint) ===
Feeley was selected in the fifth round with the 155th overall pick of the 2001 NFL draft by the Philadelphia Eagles. He spent his rookie year in Philadelphia as the third-string quarterback, backing up Donovan McNabb and Koy Detmer. In the season finale of his rookie season, Feeley came off the bench in the fourth quarter and threw two touchdown passes in a 26-second span to bring Philadelphia back from a 13–3 deficit, and win the game by a score of 17–13 over the Tampa Bay Buccaneers.

The following season, after McNabb and Detmer went down with injuries, the 8–3 Eagles called on Feeley to preserve the team's Super Bowl aspirations. Feeley surprisingly helped lead the Eagles to four straight wins, and secured the number one seed in the playoffs.

With McNabb playing the entire 2003 season injury-free, Feeley was not called upon and did not take a single snap during the season. However, he showed enough in the previous two seasons to garner interest around the league.

=== Miami Dolphins ===
Feeley was traded to the Miami Dolphins in March 2004 in exchange for Miami's 2005 second round pick (used by Philadelphia to select wide receiver Reggie Brown). Feeley was set to compete for the Dolphins' starting quarterback job with Jay Fiedler. After the competition, he and Fiedler traded starts throughout the season.

The Dolphins season was considered a disaster. Their star running back Ricky Williams retired prior to the season after a failed drug test, and head coach Dave Wannstedt resigned from the team following a 1–8 start. Feeley would under-perform as well; in 11 games, Feeley threw 11 touchdowns against 15 interceptions, for a 61.7 quarterback rating.

Feeley would help produce a few bright spots on the year. Following the 1–9 start to enter their bye week, Feeley was given the start in the next six games, going 3–3 (the Dolphins would finish with a 4–12 record) and showing signs of improvement as a starter. Though two of those wins came against the lowly Cleveland Browns and San Francisco 49ers, on December 20, 2004, Feeley's 2–11 Dolphins upset the 12–1 Patriots on Monday Night Football, in a game that has become known as "The Night That Courage Wore Orange." With the Dolphins trailing by 11 with just 3:59 to play, Feeley guided the team to two late scores, including a game-winning touchdown to Derrius Thompson to upset the defending Super Bowl champions. The game was significant, as the 14–2 Patriots would miss out on homefield advantage throughout the playoffs against the 15–1 Steelers. It was also the last time the Patriots would lose that season, en route to another Super Bowl championship.

Due to his strong play to end the season, Feeley was named the starting quarterback going into the 2005 season by new coach Nick Saban. However, Gus Frerotte was instead named the starter.

=== San Diego Chargers ===
Feeley was traded to the San Diego Chargers midway through the 2005 season in exchange for Cleo Lemon. As the third-string quarterback behind Drew Brees and Philip Rivers, he did not play the entire season.

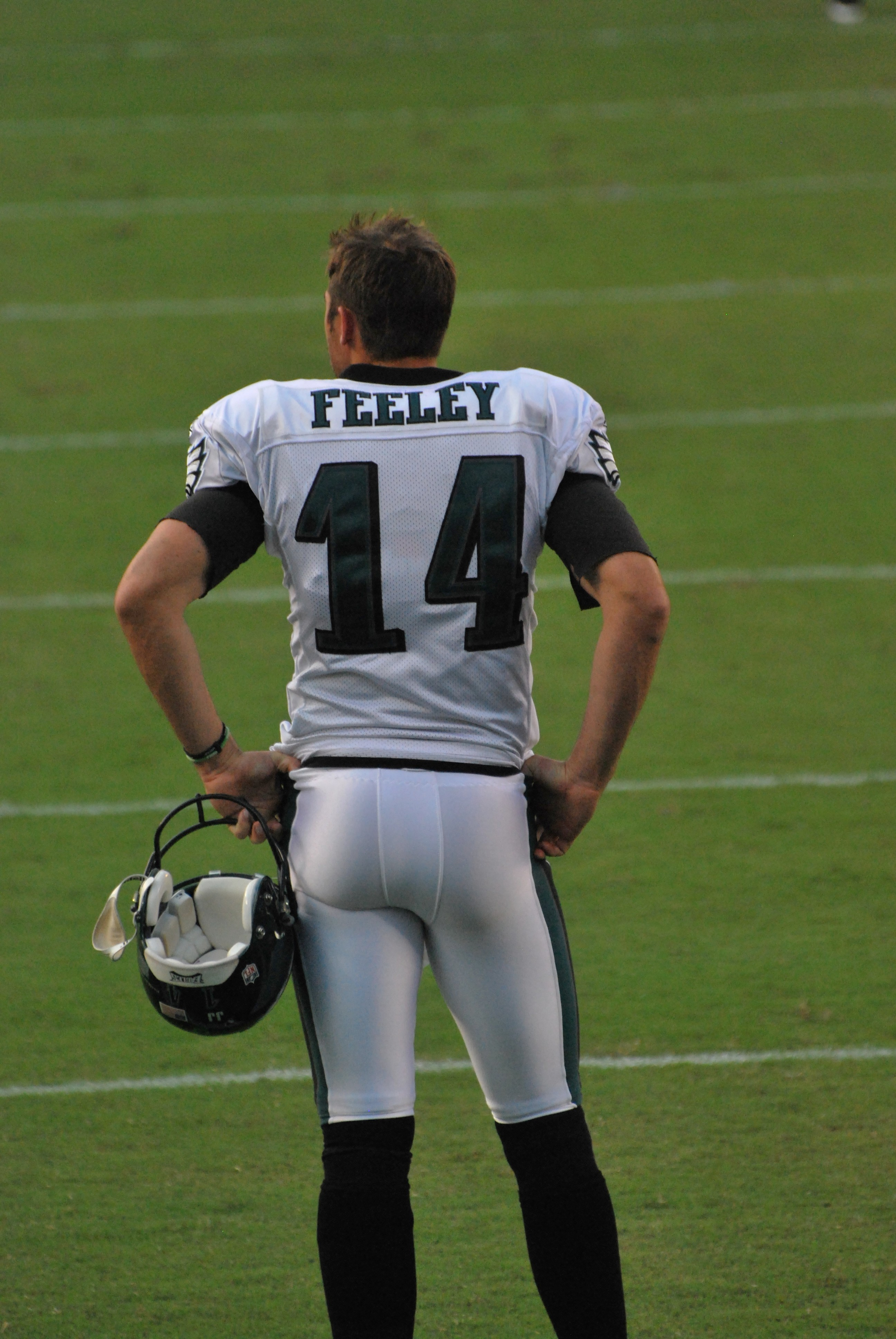
Feeley with the Philadelphia Eagles in January 2008

=== Philadelphia Eagles (second stint) ===
Feeley was signed by the Eagles on August 30, 2006, shortly after being released by the Chargers. When McNabb was injured for the season on November 18, 2006, there was speculation that the more youthful Feeley might be named as the new starting quarterback, but head coach Andy Reid went with Jeff Garcia, who led the Eagles to a late-season turnaround and division title. Feeley did play most of the Eagles' regular season finale against the Atlanta Falcons, leading the team to victory with 321 passing yards and three touchdown passes, preventing the Falcons from securing a wild card berth.

With Garcia and Feeley both becoming free agents at the end of the season, Feeley signed a three-year contract extension with the Eagles on February 25, 2007. Despite Garcia's success from the previous season, the Eagles viewed Feeley as a better long-term backup because of his age, familiarity of the system, and fit in the locker room.

Starting in place of an injured Donovan McNabb on November 25, Feeley threw for 345 yards and three touchdowns with three interceptions in a 31–28 game loss to the then-undefeated New England Patriots. The 10–0 Patriots had beaten opponents by an average of 25 points, and the Eagles entered the game as the largest underdogs in NFL history at the time. On December 2, Feeley played again for the injured McNabb. He threw four interceptions, three of those to Lofa Tatupu in a 28–24 loss to the Seattle Seahawks.

Feeley was released by the Eagles on September 6, 2009, to make room for Michael Vick.

=== Carolina Panthers ===
Feeley drew interest from the Packers and Patriots, but signed with the Carolina Panthers on September 15, 2009.

=== St. Louis Rams ===
On March 5, 2010, Feeley agreed to a two-year contract with the St. Louis Rams. Although he was in competition for the starting job, #1 pick Sam Bradford won the starting job in the preseason. During the 2011 regular season, Feeley replaced an injured Bradford for three games and he led the Rams to a stunning upset of the New Orleans Saints on October 30. It was the first win of the season for St. Louis which entered the game with an 0–6 record.

== Career statistics ==
=== NFL ===
==== Regular season ====
Year	Team	Games			Passing								Rushing				Sacks		Fumbles (Note: Fumbles lost data taken from Pro Football Reference career game log)	
Year	Team	GP	GS	Record	Cmp	Att	Pct	Yds	Y/A	TD	Int	Rtg	Att	Yds	Avg	TD	Sck	SckY	Fum	Lost
2001	PHI	1	0	–	10	14	71.4	143	10.2	2	1	114.0	0	0	0.0	0	0	0	0	0
2002	PHI	6	5	4–1	86	154	55.8	1,011	6.6	6	5	75.4	12	6	0.5	0	7	48	2	1
2003	PHI	0	0	DNP																
2004	MIA	11	8	3–5	191	356	53.7	1,893	5.3	11	15	61.7	14	13	0.9	1	23	136	10	5
2005	MIA	0	0	DNP																
2005	SD	0	0	DNP																
2006	PHI	2	0	–	26	38	68.4	342	9.0	3	0	122.9	1	3	3.0	0	1	0	1	1
2007	PHI	3	2	0–2	59	103	57.3	681	6.6	5	8	61.2	7	23	3.3	0	3	10	1	0
2008	PHI	0	0	DNP																
2009	CAR	0	0	DNP																
2010	STL	0	0	DNP																
2011	STL	5	3	1–2	53	97	54.6	548	5.6	1	2	66.0	3	4	1.3	0	10	72	3	2
Career		28	18	8–10	425	762	55.8	4,618	6.1	28	31	69.1	37	49	1.3	1	44	276	17	9

==== Playoffs ====
Year	Team	Games			Passing								Rushing				Sacks		Fumbles	
Year	Team	GP	GS	Record	Cmp	Att	Pct	Yds	Y/A	TD	Int	Rtg	Att	Yds	Avg	TD	Sck	SckY	Fum	Lost
2001	PHI	0	0	DNP																
2002	PHI	0	0	DNP																
2003	PHI	0	0	DNP																
2006	PHI	0	0	DNP																
2008	PHI	0	0	DNP																

=== College ===
		Passing						Rushing			
Year	Team	Comp	Att	Yds	TD	INT	Rtg	Att	Yds	Avg	TD
1997	Oregon	5	6	95	1	0	271.3	1	2	2.0	1
1998	Oregon	0	0	0	0	0	0.0	1	-1	-1.0	0
1999	Oregon	136	259	1,951	14	6	129.0	31	-5	-0.2	0
2000	Oregon	5	13	87	0	0	94.7	4	4	1.0	0
Career		146	278	2,133	15	6	130.5	37	0	0.0	1

== Personal life ==
In 2010, Feeley married U.S. women's international soccer player Heather Mitts in Cabo San Lucas, Mexico. They currently reside in Philadelphia, Pennsylvania. On January 30, 2014, the couple gave birth to a baby boy, Connor William Feeley, and a daughter, Blake Harper, followed in spring 2016. Their third child, Ace, a son, was born in 2018.
