= Tyreo Harrison =

American football player (born 1980)

No. 54, 55
- Position: Linebacker

Personal information
- Born: May 15, 1980 (age 46); Sulphur Springs, Texas, U.S.
- Listed height: 6 ft 2 in (1.88 m)
- Listed weight: 238 lb (108 kg)

Career information
- High school: Sulphur Springs
- College: Notre Dame
- NFL draft: 2002: 6th round, 198th overall pick

Career history
- Philadelphia Eagles (2002–2003); Green Bay Packers (2004)*; Houston Texans (2005)*
- * Offseason or practice squad member only

Career NFL statistics
- Total tackles: 3
- Stats at Pro Football Reference

Tyreo Tremayne Harrison (born May 15, 1980) is an American former professional football player who was a linebacker in the National Football League (NFL). He played college football for the Notre Dame Fighting Irish and was selected 198th overall by the Philadelphia Eagles in the sixth round of the 2002 NFL draft.

Harrison was also a member of the Green Bay Packers and Houston Texans.

Harrison later became a graduate student in the College of Business at UTSA, even winning an award for Most Outstanding Graduate Student in the College of Business for the 2012–2013 academic year.
