= Bobby Taylor (American football) =

American football player (born 1973)

No. 21, 24
- Position: Cornerback

Personal information
- Born: March 27, 1973 (age 53); Houston, Texas, U.S.
- Listed height: 6 ft 3 in (1.91 m)
- Listed weight: 216 lb (98 kg)

Career information
- High school: Longview (Longview, Texas)
- College: Notre Dame
- NFL draft: 1995: 2nd round, 50th overall pick

Career history
- Philadelphia Eagles (1995–2003); Seattle Seahawks (2004)

Awards and highlights
- Second-team All-Pro (2002); Pro Bowl (2002); PFWA All-Rookie Team (1995); Jack Tatum Trophy (1994); Consensus All-American (1994); First-team All-American (1993)

Career NFL statistics
- Total tackles: 384
- Sacks: 4.0
- Forced fumbles: 6
- Fumble recoveries: 11
- Interceptions: 19
- Defensive touchdowns: 2
- Stats at Pro Football Reference

Robert Taylor III (born December 28, 1973) is an American former professional football player who was a cornerback for 10 seasons in the National Football League (NFL). He played college football for the Notre Dame Fighting Irish, earning consensus All-American honors. He was selected in the second round of the 1995 NFL draft by the Philadelphia Eagles. He also played for the Seattle Seahawks.

== Early life ==
Taylor was born in Houston, Texas. He attended Longview High School in Longview, Texas, and played high school football for the Longview Lobos and was also a member of the Lobos' Texas Class 5A state basketball championship team. In addition to playing for the Lobos 1992 Basketball State Championship Team; Taylor was a three-year starter for the Lobos in football he ran a leg on the state champion 1,600-meter relay squad. He was inducted into the Texas High School Football Hall of Fame's 2012 class. Taylor was a two-time Class 5A all-state pick for football, and named to the first-team defense on the UIL all-century team in 2009. These accolades earned him as the first player in Longview Lobo history to have his jersey, No. 24, retired.

== College career ==
Taylor attended the University of Notre Dame, where he played for the Notre Dame Fighting Irish football team from 1992 to 1994. As a Junior in 1994, was recognized as a consensus first-team All-American.

== Professional career ==
Pre-draft measurables
Height	Weight	Arm length	Hand span
6 ft 3 in (1.91 m)	208 lb (94 kg)	33 in (0.84 m)	10 in (0.25 m)

Taylor was selected in the second round of the 1995 NFL draft by the Philadelphia Eagles. He played for the Eagles from 1995 until 2003. He was selected for one Pro Bowl during his time as an Eagle, following the 2002 season in which he had five interceptions and a touchdown return. He was also a second-team All-Pro selection in 2002.

After playing nine seasons for the Eagles, Taylor played for the Seattle Seahawks in ten games during his final season in 2004. In ten NFL seasons, he appeared in 129 regular season games, started 109 of them, amassed 384 tackles and four quarterback sacks, with 19 interceptions for 224 interception return yards and two touchdowns. He also compiled 11 fumble recoveries and six forced fumbles.

=== NFL statistics ===
Year	Team	GP	COMB	TOTAL	AST	SACK	FF	FR	YDS	INT	YDS	AVG	LNG	TD	PD
1995	PHI	16	51	47	4	0.0	0	0	0	2	52	26	35	0	17
1996	PHI	16	62	55	7	1.0	0	1	0	3	−1	0	0	0	23
1997	PHI	6	18	14	4	2.0	2	0	0	0	0	0	0	0	3
1998	PHI	11	31	22	9	0.0	0	0	0	0	0	0	0	0	6
1999	PHI	15	47	40	7	0.0	0	3	0	4	59	15	28	1	17
2000	PHI	16	44	37	7	0.0	1	1	0	3	64	21	38	0	18
2001	PHI	16	37	34	3	1.0	2	3	0	1	5	5	5	0	17
2002	PHI	16	57	46	11	0.0	1	2	0	5	43	9	23	1	15
2003	PHI	7	19	18	1	0.0	0	0	0	1	2	2	2	0	10
2004	SEA	10	12	10	2	0.0	1	0	0	0	0	0	0	0	2
Career		128	378	323	55	4.0	7	10	0	19	224	12	38	2	128

== Personal ==
Taylor's father, Robert Taylor, won a gold medal and a silver medal in the 1972 Summer Olympics while attending Texas Southern University in Houston.

Taylor appeared on an episode of MTV Cribs.

Bobby is married to Michelle Melecio Taylor, and has three sons.
