= Kori Dickerson =

American football player (born 1978)

No. 86
- Position: Tight end

Personal information
- Born: December 6, 1978 (age 47); Los Angeles, California, U.S.
- Listed height: 6 ft 4 in (1.93 m)
- Listed weight: 241 lb (109 kg)

Career information
- College: USC

Career history
- 2002-2003: Philadelphia Eagles
- 2003: Frankfurt Galaxy
- 2004: Washington Redskins
- 2005: Cincinnati Bengals*
- 2005: Calgary Stampeders
- 2006: Detroit Lions*
- 2006: Hamburg Sea Devils
- 2007-2008: Hamilton Tiger-Cats
- * Offseason or practice squad member only
- Stats at Pro Football Reference

Kori Markese Dickerson (born December 6, 1978) is an American former professional football player who was a tight end in the National Football League (NFL) and Canadian Football League (CFL).

== Pre-professional career ==
Dickerson prepped at Washington Preparatory High School, and he played college football at the University of Southern California.

== Professional career ==
Previously, he played with the NFL Europe Hamburg Sea Devils and the National Football League Detroit Lions and Philadelphia Eagles.
