= Quinton Caver =

American football player (born 1978)

No. 55, 52, 56, 91
- Position: Linebacker

Personal information
- Born: August 22, 1978 (age 48); Anniston, Alabama, U.S.
- Listed height: 6 ft 4 in (1.93 m)
- Listed weight: 241 lb (109 kg)

Career information
- High school: Anniston
- College: Arkansas
- NFL draft: 2001: 2nd round, 55th overall pick

Career history
- Philadelphia Eagles (2001–2002); Kansas City Chiefs (2002–2004); Dallas Cowboys (2005); Hamilton Tiger-Cats (2007)

Awards and highlights
- First-team All-SEC (2000)

Career NFL statistics
- Games played: 53
- Total tackles: 69
- Fumble recoveries: 1
- Stats at Pro Football Reference

Quinton Tyrone Caver (/ˈkeɪvər/; born August 22, 1978) is an American former professional football player who was a linebacker in the National Football League (NFL) for the Philadelphia Eagles, Kansas City Chiefs, and Dallas Cowboys. He also was a member of the Hamilton Tiger-Cats in the Canadian Football League (CFL). He played college football for the Arkansas Razorbacks.

== Early life ==
Caver attended Anniston High School, where he was an All-state selection at linebacker as a senior.

He accepted a football scholarship from the University of Arkansas. He was a defensive end, before being moved to middle linebacker and becoming a starter as a junior.

As a senior, he started 11 games at middle linebacker, recording 91 tackles (second on the team) and one interception. He had 22 tackles against the University of Alabama. He made 6 tackles and returned one interception for a 33-yard touchdown against Louisiana State University, earning the SEC Defensive Player of the Week honors for the third time that year and becoming the first player in the history of the award to receive it in back-to-back weeks.

He finished his college career with 24 starts in 44 games, 239 tackles, 30 tackles for loss (ninth in school history), 6.5 quarterback sacks, 10 passes defensed, one interception and 3 fumble recoveries.

== Professional career ==
=== Philadelphia Eagles ===
Caver was selected by the Philadelphia Eagles in the second round (55th overall) of the 2001 NFL draft. As a rookie, he played in 11 games and made 11 tackles. In 2002, he was waived so the team could claim linebacker Keith Adams on October 21.

=== Kansas City Chiefs ===
On October 28, 2002, he was signed as a free agent by the Kansas City Chiefs. On December 13, he was placed on the injured reserve list with a right shoulder injury, that he suffered in week thirteen against the Arizona Cardinals.

On August 31, 2003, he was released. On September 15, he was re-signed after linebacker Kawika Mitchell was injured. He was limited with a back injury during the season.

In 2004, he played in 16 games (four starts), registering a career-high 32 tackles (23 solo), to go along with 2 passes defensed, 2 quarterback pressures and 17 special teams tackles (third on the team). On August 29, 2005, he was released after being limited with a left knee injury during training camp.

=== Dallas Cowboys ===
On November 9, 2005, he signed with the Dallas Cowboys as a free agent, who were looking to add depth to the linebacker spot after placing Al Singleton on the injured reserve list. He was not re-signed at the end of the season.

=== Hamilton Tiger-Cats ===
On March 21, 2007, he was signed by the Hamilton Tiger-Cats of the Canadian Football League, to play as a defensive end. He was released on June 25.
