= Rashard Cook =

American football player (born 1977)

No. 23
- Position: Safety

Personal information
- Born: April 18, 1977 (age 49); San Diego, California, U.S.

Career information
- High school: Morse (San Diego)
- College: USC
- NFL draft: 1999: 6th round, 184th overall pick

Career history
- Chicago Bears (1999)*; Philadelphia Eagles (1999–2002)
- * Offseason or practice squad member only

Awards and highlights
- First-team All-Pac-10 (1998)

Career NFL statistics
- Total tackles: 57
- Sacks: 3
- Forced fumbles: 3
- Fumble recoveries: 1
- Interceptions: 2
- Stats at Pro Football Reference

Rashard Cook (born April 18, 1977) is an American former professional football player who was a safety in the National Football League (NFL). He played college football for the USC Trojans

== College career ==
Cook played college football at the University of Southern California.

== Professional career ==
Cook was selected by the Chicago Bears in the sixth round of the 1999 NFL draft with the 184th overall pick. He played for the Philadelphia Eagles between 1999 and 2002.
