= Julian Jones =

American football player (born 1978)

No. 27, 41
- Position: Safety

Personal information
- Born: June 8, 1978 (age 48); Phoenix, Arizona, U.S.
- Listed height: 6 ft 0 in (1.83 m)
- Listed weight: 190 lb (86 kg)

Career information
- High school: Carl Albert (Midwest City, Oklahoma)
- College: Missouri (1997–2000)
- NFL draft: 2001: undrafted

Career history
- Philadelphia Eagles (2001–2002); Carolina Panthers (2002–2003)*
- * Offseason or practice squad member only

Awards and highlights
- Third-team All-Big 12 (1999)

Career NFL statistics
- Games played: 2
- Tackles: 2
- Stats at Pro Football Reference

Julian Deon Jones (born June 8, 1978) is an American former professional football safety who played for the Philadelphia Eagles of the National Football League (NFL). He played college football for the Missouri Tigers. Jones also had a stint with the Carolina Panthers.

== Early life ==
Jones was born on June 8, 1978, in Phoenix, Arizona. He attended Carl Albert High School in Midwest City, Oklahoma.

== College career ==
Jones played college football for the Missouri Tigers from 1997 to 2000 and was a four-year letterman. As a junior, he had 91 tackles and six interceptions, earning third-team All-Big 12 honors. Jones finished with 181 return yards, seven interceptions and one pick-six. In his senior year, he was an All-Big 12 honorable mention and was also selected to play in the Blue–Gray Football Classic.

== Professional career ==
=== Philadelphia Eagles ===
After going undrafted in the 2001 NFL draft, Jones signed with the Philadelphia Eagles as an undrafted free agent. On August 16, 2001, he was placed on the injured reserve with a shoulder injury. On September 1, 2002, Jones was released and signed to the practice squad. On September 26, he was elevated to the active roster. Jones played in the following two games and made two tackles before he was released on October 8. On October 9, Jones was signed to the practice squad. On November 1, he was promoted to the active roster but he was inactive against the Chicago Bears. On November 19, Jones was released by the team.

=== Carolina Panthers ===
On November 27, 2002, Jones was signed to the practice squad of the Carolina Panthers. On January 2, 2003, he signed a reserve/futures contract with the team. On July 14, Jones was waived.
