= 2004–05 NFL playoffs =

American football tournament

- Dates: January 8–February 6, 2005
- Season: 2004
- Teams: 12
- Games played: 11
- Super Bowl XXXIX site: Alltel Stadium; Jacksonville, Florida
- Defending champions: New England Patriots
- Champion: New England Patriots (3rd title)
- Runner-up: Philadelphia Eagles
- Conference runners-up: Atlanta Falcons; Pittsburgh Steelers
NFL playoffs
← 2003–04	2005–06 →

The National Football League playoffs for the 2004 season began on January 8, 2005. The postseason tournament concluded with the New England Patriots defeating the Philadelphia Eagles in Super Bowl XXXIX, 24–21, on February 6, at Alltel Stadium in Jacksonville, Florida.

The Minnesota Vikings and St. Louis Rams became the first teams to win a playoff game despite finishing the regular season with a record of .500 or worse, as both posted an 8–8 record in the regular season. Minnesota defeated the Green Bay Packers and St. Louis defeated the Seattle Seahawks in the wild card round. Four other teams have since won a playoff game despite a regular season record at or below .500.

With the St. Louis Rams and Atlanta Falcons facing each other in the NFC Divisional playoffs, the St. Louis Rams became the first team in NFL history to face every team within their respective conference in the postseason at least once.

== Participants ==
Within each conference, the four division winners and the top two non-division winners with the best overall regular season records) qualified for the playoffs. The four division winners are seeded 1–4 based on their overall won-lost-tied record, and the wild card teams are seeded 5–6. The NFL does not use a fixed bracket playoff system, and there are no restrictions regarding teams from the same division matching up in any round. In the first round, dubbed the wild-card playoffs or wild-card weekend, the third-seeded division winner hosts the sixth-seed wild card, and the fourth seed hosts the fifth. The 1 and 2 seeds from each conference received a first-round bye. In the second round, the divisional playoffs, the number 1 seed hosts the worst-surviving seed from the first round (seed 4, 5, or 6), while the number 2 seed will play the other team (seed 3, 4, or 5). The two surviving teams from each conference's divisional playoff games met in the respective AFC and NFC Conference Championship games, hosted by the higher seed. Although the Super Bowl, the championship round of the playoffs, is played at a neutral site, the designated home team is based on an annual rotation by conference.

Playoff seeds
Seed	AFC	NFC
1	Pittsburgh Steelers (North winner)	Philadelphia Eagles (East winner)
2	New England Patriots (East winner)	Atlanta Falcons (South winner)
3	Indianapolis Colts (South winner)	Green Bay Packers (North winner)
4	San Diego Chargers (West winner)	Seattle Seahawks (West winner)
5	New York Jets (wild card)	St. Louis Rams (wild card)
6	Denver Broncos (wild card)	Minnesota Vikings (wild card)

== Bracket ==
Jan 9 – RCA Dome	Jan 16 – Gillette Stadium
6	Denver	24
3	Indianapolis	3
3	Indianapolis	49	Jan 23 – Heinz Field
2	New England	20
AFC
Jan 8 – Qualcomm Stadium	2	New England	41
Jan 15 – Heinz Field
1	Pittsburgh	27
5	NY Jets	20*	AFC Championship
5	NY Jets	17
4	San Diego	17	Feb 6 – Alltel Stadium
1	Pittsburgh	20*
Wild Card playoffs
Divisional playoffs
Jan 8 – Qwest Field	A2	New England	24
Jan 15 – Georgia Dome
N1	Philadelphia	21
5	St. Louis	27	Super Bowl XXXIX
5	St. Louis	17
4	Seattle	20	Jan 23 – Lincoln Financial Field
2	Atlanta	47
NFC
Jan 9 – Lambeau Field	2	Atlanta	10
Jan 16 – Lincoln Financial Field
1	Philadelphia	27
6	Minnesota	31	NFC Championship
6	Minnesota	14
3	Green Bay	17
1	Philadelphia	27

* Indicates OT victory

== Schedule ==
In the United States, ABC broadcast the first two Wild Card playoff games, then CBS broadcast the rest of the AFC playoff games. Fox televised the rest of the NFC games and Super Bowl XXXIX.

Round	Away team	Score	Home team	Date	Kickoff (ET / UTC−5)	TV
Wild-card round	St. Louis Rams	27–20	Seattle Seahawks	January 8, 2005	4:30 p.m.	ABC
Wild-card round	New York Jets	20–17 (OT)	San Diego Chargers	January 8, 2005	8:00 p.m.	ABC
Wild-card round	Denver Broncos	24–49	Indianapolis Colts	January 9, 2005	1:00 p.m.	CBS
Wild-card round	Minnesota Vikings	31–17	Green Bay Packers	January 9, 2005	4:30 p.m.	Fox
Divisional round	New York Jets	17–20 (OT)	Pittsburgh Steelers	January 15, 2005	4:30 p.m.	CBS
Divisional round	St. Louis Rams	17–47	Atlanta Falcons	January 15, 2005	8:00 p.m.	Fox
Divisional round	Minnesota Vikings	14–27	Philadelphia Eagles	January 16, 2005	1:00 p.m.	Fox
Divisional round	Indianapolis Colts	3–20	New England Patriots	January 16, 2005	4:30 p.m.	CBS
Conference championships	Atlanta Falcons	10–27	Philadelphia Eagles	January 23, 2005	3:00 p.m.	Fox
Conference championships	New England Patriots	41–27	Pittsburgh Steelers	January 23, 2005	6:30 p.m.	CBS
Super Bowl XXXIX Alltel Stadium Jacksonville, Florida	New England Patriots	24–21	Philadelphia Eagles	February 6, 2005	6:30 p.m.	Fox

== Wild-card round ==
=== Saturday, January 8, 2005 ===
==== NFC: St. Louis Rams 27, Seattle Seahawks 20 ====
St. Louis Rams vs. Seattle Seahawks – Game summary

Quarter	1	2	3	4	Total
Rams	7	7	3	10	27
Seahawks	3	7	3	7	20

at Qwest Field, Seattle, Washington

- Game time: 4:30 p.m. EST/1:30 p.m. PST
- Game weather: 45 °F (7 °C), partly cloudy
- Game attendance: 65,397
- Referee: Walt Coleman
- TV announcers (ABC): Mike Patrick (play-by-play), Joe Theismann, Paul Maguire (color commentators), and Suzy Kolber (sideline reporter)

Game information

First quarter

- STL – Torry Holt 15-yard pass from Marc Bulger (Jeff Wilkins kick), 11:33. Rams 7–0. Drive: 6 plays, 75 yards, 3:27.
- SEA – Josh Brown 47-yard field goal, 6:35. Rams 7–3. Drive: 9 plays, 46 yards, 4:30.

Second quarter

- STL – Marshall Faulk 1-yard run (Jeff Wilkins kick), 2:05. Rams 14–3. Drive: 6 plays, 75 yards, 3:33.
- SEA – Bobby Engram 19-yard pass from Matt Hasselbeck (Josh Brown kick), 8:18. Rams 14–10. Drive: 9 plays, 84 yards, 5:14.

Third quarter

- SEA – Josh Brown 30-yard field goal, 8:52. Rams 14–13. Drive: 14 plays, 64 yards, 6:08.
- STL – Jeff Wilkins 38-yard field goal, 2:35. Rams 17–13. Drive: 12 plays, 48 yards, 6:17.

Fourth quarter

- SEA – Darrell Jackson 23-yard pass from Matt Hasselbeck (Josh Brown kick), 13:43. Seahawks 20–17. Drive: 7 plays, 76 yards, 3:52.
- STL – Jeff Wilkins 27-yard field goal, 8:07. Tied 20–20. Drive: 11 plays, 60 yards, 5:36.
- STL – Cam Cleeland 17-yard pass from Marc Bulger (Jeff Wilkins kick), 2:11. Rams 27–20. Drive: 7 plays, 76 yards, 3:31.

Top passers

- STL – Marc Bulger – 18/32, 313 yards, 2 TD, INT
- SEA – Matt Hasselbeck – 27/43, 341 yards, 2 TD, INT

Top rushers

- STL – Marshall Faulk – 13 rushes, 55 yards, TD
- SEA – Shaun Alexander – 15 rushes, 40 yards, TD

Top receivers

- STL – Torry Holt – 6 receptions, 108 yards, TD
- SEA – Darrell Jackson – 12 receptions, 128 yards, TD

Although the Rams barely made the playoffs with an 8–8 record, two of their regular season wins were against the Seahawks. They proved they were up to the task again, beating the Seahawks in a back and forth game by scoring a touchdown with 2:11 left to go and then forcing a turnover on their own 5-yard line. With the win, the Rams became the first team in NFL history to win a playoff game after going 8–8 in the regular season. The Rams' defense held Seahawks running back Shaun Alexander, the NFL's second leading rusher during the season, to only 40 yards on 15 carries.

Shortly after the opening kickoff, Rams quarterback Marc Bulger completed a 52-yard pass to Torry Holt at the Seahawks' 11-yard line. Three plays later, he threw a 15-yard touchdown pass to Holt to give the Rams an early 7–0 lead. Then on the Seahawks' first play of the game, cornerback Travis Fisher intercepted a pass from Matt Hasselbeck at the Seahawks' 44-yard line. Bulger once again tried to go deep, but the Seahawks were ready and Ken Hamlin picked off his pass at the 4-yard line. After an exchange of punts, the Seahawks drove 46 yards in 9 plays and scored with Josh Brown's 47-yard field goal, cutting their deficit to 7–3.

Early in the second quarter, Bulger's 52-yard completion to Kevin Curtis set up a 1-yard touchdown run by Marshall Faulk. But the Seahawks responded by driving 84 yards in 9 plays. On the eighth play of the drive, Hasselbeck's pass was intercepted, but a 15-yard penalty on Trev Faulk nullified the play and gave the Seahawks the ball at the Rams' 19-yard line. Taking advantage of his second chance, Hasselbeck threw a 19-yard touchdown completion to Bobby Engram on the next play, making the score 14–10.

On the opening drive of the third quarter, the Seahawks moved the ball 64 yards in 14 plays and scored with Brown's 30-yard field goal, cutting their deficit to 1 point. The Rams responded with a field goal from Jeff Wilkins to retake their 4-point lead, but Hasselbeck stormed back, completing five consecutive passes for 75 yards on the Seahawks' ensuing drive and finishing it off with a 23-yard touchdown pass to Darrell Jackson, giving his team their first lead of the game 1:17 into the fourth quarter. But the Rams struck back with an 11-play, 60-yard drive to tie the game with a second field goal from Wilkins. Then after forcing a punt, the Rams drove 76 yards in seven plays, featuring two key receptions by players who had not caught a pass yet in the game. The first was a 31-yard completion from Bulger to Shaun McDonald on third down and 2. Then three plays later, Bulger threw a 17-yard touchdown pass to Cam Cleeland with 2:11 left in regulation.

Hasselbeck started out the ensuing drive with three of four completions for 54 yards, moving the ball to the Rams' 11-yard line. But over the next two plays, he threw an incompleted pass and was sacked for a 6-yard loss by Rams lineman Jimmy Kennedy. After that, he completed a 12-yard pass to Engram, bringing up fourth down and four on the Rams' 5-yard line. With 27 seconds left, Hasselbeck tried to connect with Engram in the end zone, but the pass zipped through his hands and the Seahawks turned the ball over on downs.

Bulger finished the game with 313 passing yards and 2 touchdowns, with 1 interception. Holt caught 6 passes for 108 yards and a touchdown, while Curtis added 4 receptions for 107 yards. Hasselbeck completed 27 of 43 passes for 341 yards and two touchdowns, with 1 interception, and rushed for 26 yards. Jackson caught 12 passes for 128 yards.

The game, notably, was also the last of wide receiver Jerry Rice's legendary career.

This was the Rams' last playoff win as the St. Louis Rams as they would relocate to Los Angeles in 2016. They would not win a playoff game until 2018.

After this loss, the Seahawks went on to win 10 consecutive home playoff games, a streak which lasted through the 2020 NFC Wild Card playoffs in which the Seahawks were once again defeated by the Rams.

This was the first postseason meeting between the Rams and Seahawks as divisional rivals.

==== AFC: New York Jets 20, San Diego Chargers 17 (OT) ====
New York Jets vs. San Diego Chargers – Game summary

Quarter	1	2	3	4	OT	Total
Jets	0	7	10	0	3	20
Chargers	0	7	0	10	0	17

at Qualcomm Stadium, San Diego, California

- Game time: 8:00 p.m. EST/5:00 p.m. PST
- Game weather: 55 °F (13 °C), slight drizzle
- Game attendance: 67,536
- Referee: Ed Hochuli
- TV announcers (ABC): Al Michaels (play-by-play), John Madden (color commentator), and Michele Tafoya (sideline reporter)

Game information

First quarter

- No scoring plays.

Second quarter

- SD – Keenan McCardell 26-yard pass from Drew Brees (Nate Kaeding kick), 9:26. Chargers 7–0. Drive: 13 plays, 88 yards, 8:25.
- NYJ – Anthony Becht 13-yard pass from Chad Pennington (Doug Brien kick), 2:54. Tied 7–7. Drive: 5 plays, 37 yards, 2:19.

Third quarter

- NYJ – Santana Moss 47-pass from Chad Pennington (Doug Brien kick), 10:29. Jets 14–7. Drive: 5 plays, 75 yards, 2:31.
- NYJ – Doug Brien 42-yard field goal, 1:23. Jets 17–7. Drive: 8 plays, 42 yards, 5:31.

Fourth quarter

- SD – Nate Kaeding 35-yard field goal, 10:43. Jets 17–10. Drive: 12 plays, 54 yards, 5:40.
- SD – Antonio Gates 1-yard pass from Drew Brees (Nate Kaeding kick), 0:11. Tied 17–17. Drive: 10 plays, 80 yards, 4:35.

Overtime

- NYJ – Doug Brien 28-yard field goal, 0:05. Jets 20–17. Drive: 8 plays, 60 yards, 4:14.

Top passers

- NYJ – Chad Pennington – 23/33, 279 yards, 2 TD
- SD – Drew Brees – 31/42, 319 yards, 2 TD, INT

Top rushers

- NYJ – Curtis Martin – 18 rushes, 66 yards
- SD – LaDainian Tomlinson – 26 rushes, 80 yards

Top receivers

- NYJ – Santana Moss – 4 receptions, 100 yards
- SD – Eric Parker – 9 receptions, 93 yards

The Jets entered the game after losing their last two regular season games, but managed to defeat the Chargers with a Doug Brien field goal in overtime. This game proved to be as close and competitive as the earlier playoff game in Seattle, featuring numerous key plays in the fourth quarter and in overtime that kept it going until 14:55 had elapsed in the extra period.

The Jets took the opening kickoff and drove to the Chargers' 11-yard line. But the Chargers' defense kept them out of the end zone and Brien missed a 31-yard field goal attempt. In the second quarter, the Chargers drove 88 yards and scored with Drew Brees' 26-yard touchdown pass to Keenan McCardell, which was initially ruled an incompletion, but overturned to a touchdown after a replay challenge. Later in the quarter, a 15-yard unsportsmanlike penalty against the Chargers on a punt gave the Jets the ball on the Chargers' 37-yard line. Five plays later, quarterback Chad Pennington completed a 13-yard touchdown pass to Anthony Becht, tying the game at 7. On their ensuing drive, the Chargers mounted a scoring threat by moving the ball to the Jets' 37-yard line, but Reggie Tongue intercepted a pass from Brees and the score remained tied at halftime.

After forcing a punt on the opening second half drive, Pennington completed three consecutive passes for 68 yards, the last one a 47-yard touchdown pass to Santana Moss. Then after forcing a punt, the Jets drove 42 yards in eight plays, featuring two receptions by Curtis Martin for 33 yards and scored with a 42-yard field goal from Brien, giving them a 17–7 lead going into the fourth quarter.

In the final period, the Chargers managed to rally back. First they drove 54 yards in 12 plays and scored with a 35-yard field goal by Nate Kaeding. The Jets responded with a drive to the Chargers' 33-yard line, Pennington threw an incomplete pass on third down and they decided to punt rather than risk a 51-yard field goal. The Chargers subsequently moved the ball 80 yards in 10 plays to tie the game on a thrilling drive in which they nearly turned the ball over twice. On the first play, Brees fumbled the ball while being sacked by linebacker Jonathan Vilma, but he recovered it himself. Then he completed a 21-yard pass to tight end Antonio Gates to pick up the first down. One play later, he completed a 44-yard pass to Gates at the Jets' 22-yard line. Two runs by LaDainian Tomlinson for 13 yards and a 7-yard run by Brees brought up third down on the Jets' 2-yard line. After Tomlinson was tackled for a 1-yard loss, A fourth-down pass Brees with under 20 seconds left fell incomplete into the end zone, but Jets linebacker Eric Barton was penalized for roughing the passer, giving the Chargers a first down from the one-yard line. Brees threw a touchdown pass to Gates on the following play, sending the game into overtime.

After an exchange of punts in overtime, the Chargers drove to the Jets' 22-yard line, but Kaeding missed a 40-yard field goal attempt late in the extra period, allowing the Jets to come back down the field. Two Pennington completions for 29 yards and a 19-yard run by LaMont Jordan then set up a 28-yard field goal from Brien with five seconds remaining in overtime.

Pennington completed 23 of 33 passes for 272 yards and 2 touchdowns. Moss finished the game with 4 receptions for 100 yards and a touchdown. Brees completed 31 of 42 passes for 319 yards and 2 touchdowns, with 1 interception. Tomlinson rushed for 80 yards and caught 9 passes for 53 yards.

The Chargers would not be eliminated in the Wild Card Round again until 2022.

This was the first postseason meeting between the Jets and Chargers.

=== Sunday, January 9, 2005 ===
==== AFC: Indianapolis Colts 49, Denver Broncos 24 ====
Denver Broncos vs. Indianapolis Colts – Game summary

Quarter	1	2	3	4	Total
Broncos	0	3	14	7	24
Colts	14	21	0	14	49

at RCA Dome, Indianapolis, Indiana

- Game time: 1:00 p.m. EST
- Game weather: Played indoors, domed stadium
- Game attendance: 56,609
- Referee: Mike Carey
- TV announcers (CBS): Jim Nantz (play-by-play), Phil Simms (color commentator), and Bonnie Bernstein (sideline reporter)

Game information

First quarter

- IND – James Mungro 2-yard pass from Peyton Manning (Mike Vanderjagt kick), 7:23. Colts 7–0. Drive: 9 plays, 76 yards, 3:43.
- IND – Edgerrin James 1-yard run (Mike Vanderjagt kick), 0:38. Colts 14–0. Drive: 8 plays, 87 yards, 4:59.

Second quarter

- IND – Dallas Clark 19-yard pass from Peyton Manning (Mike Vanderjagt kick), 8:11. Colts 21–0. Drive: 4 plays, 52 yards, 1:42.
- DEN – Jason Elam 33-yard field goal, 5:19. Colts 21–3. Drive: 7 plays, 51 yards, 2:52.
- IND – Reggie Wayne 35-yard pass from Peyton Manning (Mike Vanderjagt kick), 4:29. Colts 28–3. Drive: 2 plays, 40 yards, 0:50.
- IND – Peyton Manning 1-yard run (Mike Vanderjagt kick), 0:06. Colts 35–3. Drive: 8 plays, 75 yards, 3:07.

Third quarter

- DEN – Rod Smith 9-yard pass from Jake Plummer (Jason Elam kick), 9:01. Colts 35–10. Drive: 10 plays, 71 yards, 5:59.
- DEN – Jeb Putzier 35-yard pass from Jake Plummer (Jason Elam kick), 1:10. Colts 35–17. Drive: 9 plays, 85 yards, 5:39.

Fourth quarter

- IND – Reggie Wayne 43-yard pass from Manning (Mike Vanderjagt kick), 12:48. Colts 42–17. Drive: 6 plays, 80 yards, 3:22.
- DEN – Tatum Bell 1-yard run (Jason Elam kick), 7:45. Colts 42–24. Drive: 10 plays, 57 yards, 5:03.
- IND – Dominic Rhodes 2-yard run (Mike Vanderjagt kick), 2:02. Colts 49–24. Drive: 9 plays, 45 yards, 5:43.

Top passers

- DEN – Jake Plummer – 24/34, 284 yards, 2 TD, INT
- IND – Peyton Manning – 27/33, 458 yards, 4 TD, INT

Top rushers

- DEN – Tatum Bell – 12 rushes, 49 yards, TD
- IND – Edgerrin James – 18 rushes, 63 yards, TD

Top receivers

- DEN – Rod Smith – 7 receptions, 99 yards, TD
- IND – Reggie Wayne – 10 receptions, 221 yards, 2 TD

The Colts followed up their wild card blowout of the Broncos in the previous year's Wild Card Round, and also made up for a loss in Denver's INVESCO Field at Mile High a week earlier with another thrashing. Indianapolis scored a franchise playoff record seven touchdowns and led 35–3 at the half. Colt quarterback Peyton Manning, who threw a record 49 touchdown passes in the 2004 regular season, completed 27 of 33 passes for 457 yards (the second highest total ever in a playoff game) and four touchdowns, including two to receiver Reggie Wayne (who had 10 receptions for 221 yards receiving on the day), and one each to tight end Dallas Clark (who caught 6 passes for 113 yards) and running back James Mungro. Manning and running backs Edgerrin James and Dominic Rhodes scored rushing touchdowns. For Denver, quarterback Jake Plummer threw for 284 yards and 2 touchdowns, with 1 interception, while receiver Rod Smith caught 7 passes for 99 yards and a score.

Manning dominated the Broncos in the first quarter, completing 11 of 14 passes for 156 yards. On the Colts second drive of the game, he completed two passes to Wayne for 41 yards and a 25-yard pass to tight end Marcus Pollard before throwing a 2-yard touchdown pass to Mungro. Then after a Denver punt, Manning completed three passes to Clark for 63 yards on an 87-yard drive that ended with a 1-yard touchdown run by James, giving Indianapolis a 14–0 lead with 38 seconds left in the first quarter.

On Denver's opening drive of the second quarter, safety Mike Doss intercepted a pass Plummer on the Colts 41-yard line. One play later, Manning threw a 49-yard completion to Wayne at the Denver 9. Rookie cornerback Kelly Herndon ended the drive by intercepting a pass from Manning in the end zone, but it did not matter. Denver was forced to punt after three plays and Troy Walters returned the ball 9 yards to the Colts 48-yard line. Manning then completed three consecutive passes for 48 yards, the last one a 19-yard touchdown throw to Clark. This time the Broncos managed to respond. Smith caught 2 passes for 41 yards on a 51-yard drive that ended with a 33-yard field goal by Jason Elam, cutting the score to 21–3. Then the Broncos tried to fool the Colts with a surprise onside kick, but it did not work. Indianapolis' Nick Rogers recovered the ball on the Denver 40-yard line, and one play later, Manning threw a 35-yard touchdown pass to Wayne. Before the end of the half, the Colts put together another touchdown drive. This time Manning went to Marvin Harrison, who had been dominated all game, completing two passes to him for 41 yards before a 20-yard catch by Wayne moved the ball to the Broncos 1-yard line. Manning finished the drive with a 1-yard touchdown run with 6 seconds left in the half, increasing the Colts lead to 35–3.

The Broncos scored on the opening drive of the second half, moving the ball 75 yards and scoring with Plummer's 9-yard touchdown pass to Smith. Then after forcing a punt, they drove 85 yards and scored with Plummer's 35-yard touchdown pass to Jeb Putzier, cutting the score to 35–17. But on the Colts ensuing drive, Wayne caught a screen pass from Manning and took it 43 yards for a touchdown, giving Indianapolis a 42–17 lead early in the fourth quarter. Denver receiver Triandos Luke returned the ensuing kickoff 41 yards to the 43-yard line, setting up a 57-yard scoring drive that ended with a 1-yard touchdown run by Tatum Bell. But Harrison recovered Elam's onside kick attempt and the Colts subsequently closed out the scoring with a 2-yard touchdown run by Rhodes. This was the last NFL game played on the first-generation AstroTurf.

This was the second consecutive postseason meeting between the Broncos and Colts. Indianapolis won the only previous meeting.

Previous playoff games
Indianapolis leads 1–0 in all-time playoff games

2003

Denver Broncos 10 @ Indianapolis Colts 41

2003 AFC Wild Card playoffs

==== NFC: Minnesota Vikings 31, Green Bay Packers 17 ====
Minnesota Vikings vs. Green Bay Packers – Game summary

Quarter	1	2	3	4	Total
Vikings	17	7	0	7	31
Packers	3	7	0	7	17

at Lambeau Field, Green Bay, Wisconsin

- Game time: 4:30 p.m. EST/3:30 p.m. CST
- Game weather: 26 °F (−3 °C), cloudy, freezing drizzle
- Game attendance: 71,075
- Referee: Walt Anderson
- TV announcers (Fox): Joe Buck (play-by-play), Troy Aikman, Cris Collinsworth (color commentators), Pam Oliver, and Chris Myers (sideline reporters)

Game information

First quarter

- MIN – Moe Williams 68-yard pass from Daunte Culpepper (Morten Andersen kick), 13:20. Vikings 7–0. Drive: 3 plays, 76 yards, 1:40.
- MIN – Randy Moss 20-yard pass from Daunte Culpepper (Morten Andersen kick), 9:50. Vikings 14–0. Drive: 4 plays, 55 yards, 1:55.
- MIN – Morten Andersen 35-yard field goal, 6:06. Vikings 17–0. Drive: 6 plays, 40 yards, 2:38.
- GB – Ryan Longwell 43-yard field goal, 2:42. Vikings 17–3. Drive: 8 plays, 37 yards, 3:24.

Second quarter

- GB – Bubba Franks 4-yard pass from Brett Favre (Ryan Longwell kick), 10:24. Vikings 17–10. Drive: 8 plays, 57 yards, 5:14.
- MIN – Nate Burleson 19-yard pass from Daunte Culpepper (Morten Andersen kick), 6:33. Vikings 24–10. Drive: 2 plays, 28 yards, 0:41.

Third quarter

- No scoring plays.

Fourth quarter

- GB – Najeh Davenport 1-yard run (Ryan Longwell kick), 13:37. Vikings 24–17. Drive: 9 plays, 78 yards, 4:16.
- MIN – Randy Moss 34-yard pass from Daunte Culpepper (Morten Andersen kick), 10:18. Vikings 31–17. Drive: 6 plays, 66 yards, 3:19.

Top passers

- MIN – Daunte Culpepper – 19/29, 284 yards, 4 TD
- GB – Brett Favre – 22/33, 216 yards, 1 TD, 4 INT

Top rushers

- MIN – Daunte Culpepper – 7 rushes, 47 yards
- GB – Ahman Green – 20 rushes, 80 yards

Top receivers

- MIN – Moe Williams – 2 receptions, 72 yards, TD
- GB – Donald Driver – 7 receptions, 78 yards

The Vikings, like the Rams, went 8–8 during the regular season. Furthermore, they had stumbled into the playoffs losing 7 of their last 10 games, the worst performance in NFL history by a playoff team in a final 10-game span. Two of their losses, by identical 34–31 scores, came in last second games to the Packers. This time, however, there was no denying the Vikings as they avenged their regular season sweep, coming out with a stellar performance on both sides of the ball. Quarterback Daunte Culpepper threw for 284 yards and four touchdowns and rushed for 54 yards, while the Vikings defense, who only intercepted 11 passes all season, picked off Green Bay counterpart Brett Favre four times. Wide receiver Randy Moss caught two touchdowns for Minnesota, but drew controversy for his celebration after his second, which decided the outcome of the contest. Moss pretended to "moon" Packer fans by pretending to pull down his pants, mocking a move done by Packer fans to the losing team's bus as they left Green Bay. Fox play-by-play announcer Joe Buck was visibly upset by Moss's celebratory move, calling it "a disgusting act". The NFL was also not amused and fined Moss $10,000 for his actions a few days later. When asked by a fan how he would the pay the fine, Moss replied, "straight cash homie".

On the Vikings' opening drive, Culpepper narrowly avoided a sack with a short completion to running back Moe Williams, who then dodged a tackle attempt from safety Darren Sharper and took off for a 68-yard touchdown reception. The Packers were forced to punt after Favre was sacked for a 10-yard loss on third down by Chris Claiborne, and Nate Burleson returned the ball 7 yards to the 45-yard line. Three plays later, Culpepper threw a 20-yard touchdown pass to Moss, giving Minnesota a 14–0 lead after just 5:05 had elapsed in the game. A 30-yard kickoff return by Najeh Davenport gave the Packers good field position on their 42-yard line, but two plays later, corner Antoine Winfield intercepted a pass from Favre and returned it 3 yards to the Vikings 43. After that, Culpepper completed two passes for 19 yards and rushed for 23, setting up a 35-yard field goal by Morten Andersen and increasing the lead to 17–0.

After being completely dominated up to this point, the Packers managed to rally back. First Davenport returned the ensuing kickoff 20 yards to the 38-yard line. Then a 21-yard completion from Favre to Javon Walker set up a 43-yard field goal by Ryan Longwell. The Vikings were forced to punt after Culpepper was sacked on third down by Michael Hawthorne, and Green Bay subsequently drove 54 yards in 12 plays and scored on Favre's 4-yard touchdown pass to tight end Bubba Franks, cutting their deficit to 17–10 with 10:24 left in the second quarter. But on the Vikings' next drive, a 29-yard reception by Burleson and a 23-yard run by Culpepper helped move the ball to the Packers 9-yard line. Green Bay seemed to catch a break when Anderson slipped on a field goal attempt, resulting in a block. But on the next play, safety Brian Russell intercepted a pass from Favre and returned it 14 yards to the Packers 28-yard line. One play later, Culpepper threw a 19-yard touchdown pass to Burleson, putting the Vikings up 24–10. The Packers subsequently drove to Minnesota's 8-yard line, but while scrambling around looking for an open receiver, Favre threw an illegal forward pass when he could have run for a first down. On the next play, Longwell missed a 28-yard field goal.

After a scoreless third quarter, Green Bay drove 78 yards in 9 plays to score on Davenport's 1-yard touchdown run, cutting their deficit to 24–17. But the Vikings responded by driving 66 yards and scoring with a 34-yard touchdown completion for Culpepper to Moss. Then after forcing a punt, Minnesota put the game away with an 8-minute drive that ran the clock down to 23 seconds.

This was the first postseason meeting between the Vikings and Packers.

== Divisional round ==
=== Saturday, January 15, 2005 ===
==== AFC: Pittsburgh Steelers 20, New York Jets 17 (OT) ====
New York Jets vs. Pittsburgh Steelers – Game summary

Quarter	1	2	3	4	OT	Total
Jets	0	10	7	0	0	17
Steelers	10	0	0	7	3	20

at Heinz Field, Pittsburgh, Pennsylvania

- Game time: 4:30 p.m. EST
- Game weather: 28 °F (−2 °C), fair
- Game attendance: 64,915
- Referee: Bill Leavy
- TV announcers (CBS): Dick Enberg (play-by-play), Dan Dierdorf (color commentator), and Armen Keteyian (sideline reporter)

Game information

First quarter

- PIT – Jeff Reed 35-yard field goal, 5:18. Steelers 3–0. Drive: 7 plays, 37 yards, 3:20.
- PIT – Jerome Bettis 3-yard run (Jeff Reed kick), 1:58. Steelers 10–0. Drive: 5 plays, 25 yards, 2:18.

Second quarter

- NYJ – Doug Brien 42-yard field goal, 10:33. Steelers 10–3. Drive: 11 plays, 38 yards, 6:25.
- NYJ – Santana Moss 75-yard punt return (Doug Brien kick), 3:00. Tied 10–10.

Third quarter

- NYJ – Reggie Tongue 86-yard interception return (Doug Brien kick), 3:52. Jets 17–10.

Fourth quarter

- PIT – Hines Ward 4-yard pass from Ben Roethlisberger (Jeff Reed kick), 6:00. Tied 17–17. Drive: 12 plays, 66 yards, 6:41.

Overtime

- PIT – Jeff Reed 33-yard field goal, 3:56. Steelers 20–17. Drive: 14 plays, 72 yards, 8:19.

Top passers

- NYJ – Chad Pennington – 21/33, 182 yards, INT
- PIT – Ben Roethlisberger – 17/30, 181 yards, TD, 2 INT

Top rushers

- NYJ – Curtis Martin – 19 rushes, 77 yards
- PIT – Jerome Bettis – 27 rushes, 101 yards, TD

Top receivers

- NYJ – Justin McCareins – 5 receptions, 82 yards
- PIT – Hines Ward – 10 receptions, 105 yards, TD

The Jets came out on the losing end of this overtime game when Doug Brien missed two consecutive field goals at the end of regulation, setting an NFL record of 3 missed game winning field goals in a single post-season. Despite a subpar performance by Steelers' rookie quarterback Ben Roethlisberger, the Steelers managed to win after Jeff Reed made a game winning 33-yard field goal 11:04 into the extra period. Steelers running back Jerome Bettis finished the game with 101 rushing yards and a touchdown, along with a 21-yard reception.

The Steelers opened up the scoring with a 43-yard field goal by Reed. Then after the ensuing kickoff, Steelers safety Troy Polamalu intercepted a pass from Chad Pennington and returned it 15 yards to the Jets 25-yard line, setting up a 3-yard touchdown run by Bettis. New York Responded with a 42-yard field goal from Brien on their next drive to cut their deficit to 10–3. Later in the second quarter, Jets receiver Santana Moss returned a punt 75 yards for a touchdown to tie the game.

Midway through third quarter, Reggie Tongue intercepted a pass from Roethlisberger and returned it 86 yards for a touchdown. On Pittsburgh's next drive, they drove all the way to New York's 23-yard line. But then Bettis fumbled and New York's Erik Coleman recovered it. After forcing a punt, the Steelers drove into scoring range for the third consecutive drive, this time scoring with Roethlisbeger's 4-yard touchdown pass to Hines Ward to tie it at 17.

The Jets responded with a drive inside the Steelers 30-yard line, but Brien missed a 47-yard field goal attempt with 2 minutes left in regulation. Two plays later, New York cornerback David Barrett gave his team another chance to score the winning points by intercepting a pass from Roethlisberger and returning it 25 yards to Pittsburgh's 36-yard line. But Brien missed another field goal, this one from 43 yards, as time expired in the fourth quarter, and the game went into overtime.

The Jets won the coin toss, but were forced to punt. Pittsburgh then drove 72 yards in 14 plays and won the game with a 33-yard field goal from Reed.

This was the first postseason meeting between the Jets and Steelers.

==== NFC: Atlanta Falcons 47, St. Louis Rams 17 ====
St. Louis Rams vs. Atlanta Falcons – Game summary

Quarter	1	2	3	4	Total
Rams	7	10	0	0	17
Falcons	14	14	10	9	47

at Georgia Dome, Atlanta, Georgia

- Game time: 8:00 p.m. EST
- Game weather: Played indoors, domed stadium
- Game attendance: 70,709
- Referee: Terry McAulay
- TV announcers (Fox): Dick Stockton (play-by-play), Daryl Johnston (color commentator), and Tony Siragusa (sideline reporter)

Game information

First quarter

- ATL – Alge Crumpler 18-yard pass from Michael Vick (Jay Feely kick), 12:00. Falcons 7–0. Drive: 5 plays, 76 yards, 3:00.
- STL – Kevin Curtis 57-yard pass from Marc Bulger (Jeff Wilkins kick), 9:14. Tied 7–7. Drive: 5 plays, 81 yards, 2:46.
- ATL – Warrick Dunn 62-yard run (Jay Feely kick), 7:52. Falcons 14–7. Drive: 4 plays, 80 yards, 1:22.

Second quarter

- ATL – Warrick Dunn 19-yard run (Jay Feely kick), 9:58. Falcons 21–7. Drive: 13 plays, 80 yards, 8:18.
- STL – Torry Holt 28-yard pass from Marc Bulger (Jeff Wilkins kick), 5:26. Falcons 21–14. Drive: 8 plays, 75 yards, 4:32.
- ATL – Allen Rossum 68-yard punt return (Jay Feely kick), 0:59. Falcons 28–14.
- STL – Jeff Wilkins 55-yard field goal, 0:00. Falcons 28–17. Drive: 9 plays, 43 yards, 0:59.

Third quarter

- ATL – Peerless Price 6-yard pass from Michael Vick (Jay Feely kick), 10:05. Falcons 35–17. Drive: 6 plays, 32 yards, 3:15.
- ATL – Jay Feely 38-yard field goal, 5:54. Falcons 38–17. Drive: 4 plays, –7 yards, 2:02.

Fourth quarter

- ATL – Marc Bulger sacked in the end zone by Brady Smith, 11:39. Falcons 40–17.
- ATL – T. J. Duckett 4-yard run (Jay Feely kick), 1:54. Falcons 47–17. Drive: 15 plays, 58 yards, 9:45.

Top passers

- STL – Marc Bulger – 23/35, 299 yards, 2 TD, INT
- ATL – Michael Vick – 12/16, 82 yards, 2 TD

Top rushers

- STL – Steven Jackson – 9 rushes, 32 yards
- ATL – Warrick Dunn – 17 rushes, 142 yards, 2 TD

Top receivers

- STL – Kevin Curtis – 7 receptions, 128 yards, TD
- ATL – Peerless Price – 3 receptions, 22 yards, TD

In a classic rout, quarterback Michael Vick and the Falcons steamrolled over the Rams in their first home playoff game since 1999, scoring on six of their nine possessions, while racking up 327 rushing yards and 232 yards on special teams. Vick combined for 201 yards (including 119 rushing yards, a playoff record for a quarterback) and threw 2 touchdown passes, while running back Warrick Dunn rushed for 142 yards and 2 touchdowns. Allen Rossum set an NFL post-season record with 152 punt return yards and added another 80 on kickoff returns.

On the Falcons opening drive, Vick rushed for 47 yards and later threw an 18-yard touchdown pass to tight end Alge Crumpler, giving his team a 7–0 lead after just 3:02 had elapsed in the game. The Rams responded with Marc Bulger's 57-yard touchdown pass to Kevin Curtis, but four plays after the ensuing kickoff, Atlanta running back Warrick Dunn scored on a 62-yard touchdown run.

Early in the second quarter, Atlanta drove 80 yards in 13 plays. Dunn rushed for 46 total yards on the drive and caught a pass for 2, eventually finishing it off with a 19-yard touchdown run to give the Falcons a 21–7 lead. The Rams struck back with an 8-play, 75-yard drive in which Steven Jackson had three carries for 29 yards. On the last play, Bulger threw a 28-yard touchdown pass to Torry Holt. Then linebacker Tommy Polley ended Atlanta's next drive by forcing a recovering a fumble from Vick on the Rams 18-yard line. But the Falcons defense forced a punt and Rossum returned it 68 yards for a touchdown.

The Rams responded by driving 43 yards and scoring on Jeff Wilkins' 55-yard field goal to cut the deficit to 28–17 on the last play of the second quarter, but the Falcons dominated the second half. First they forced the Rams to punt, and Rossum returned the ball 39 yards to the St. Louis 32-yard line. Five plays later, Vick threw a 6-yard touchdown pass to Peerless Price. Then Rossum returned the Rams next punt 45 yards to the Rams 13-yard line, setting a 38-yard field goal by Jay Feely. Throughout the rest of the game, the Falcons intercepted a pass from Bulger, forced him to lose a fumble, and Brady Smith sacked him in the end zone for a safety. After the safety, Atlanta drove 58 yards in 15 plays, taking 9:45 off the clock on the way to running back T. J. Duckett's 4-yard touchdown run with 2 minutes left in the game.

Bulger finished with 292 passing yards and 2 touchdowns, with 1 interception. Curtis caught 7 passes for 128 yards. Duckett rushed for 66 yards and a touchdown. This would be the last playoff game for the St. Louis Rams, as they relocated to Los Angeles in 2016, and the franchise's last overall until 2017, which would also be against Atlanta.

This was the first postseason meeting between the Rams and Falcons.

=== Sunday, January 16, 2005 ===
==== NFC: Philadelphia Eagles 27, Minnesota Vikings 14 ====
Minnesota Vikings vs. Philadelphia Eagles – Game summary

Quarter	1	2	3	4	Total
Vikings	0	7	0	7	14
Eagles	7	14	0	6	27

at Lincoln Financial Field, Philadelphia, Pennsylvania

- Game time: 1:00 p.m. EST
- Game weather: 31 °F (−1 °C), cloudy
- Game attendance: 67,722
- Referee: Pete Morelli
- TV announcers (Fox): Joe Buck (play-by-play), Troy Aikman, Cris Collinsworth (color commentators), Pam Oliver, and Chris Myers (sideline reporters)

Game information

First quarter

- PHI – Freddie Mitchell 2-yard pass from Donovan McNabb (David Akers kick), 6:18. Eagles 7–0. Drive: 7 plays, 53 yards, 4:34.

Second quarter

- PHI – Westbrook 7-yard pass from Donovan McNabb (David Akers kick), 14:16. Eagles 14–0. Drive: 7 plays, 92 yards, 3:57.
- MIN – Daunte Culpepper 7-yard run (Morten Andersen kick), 10:37. Eagles 14–7. Drive: 6 plays, 58 yards, 3:39.
- PHI – Freddie Mitchell fumble recovery in end zone (David Akers kick), 10:08. Eagles 21–7. Drive: 2 plays, 46 yards, 0:29.

Third quarter

- No scoring plays.

Fourth quarter

- PHI – David Akers 21-yard field goal, 13:20. Eagles 24–7. Drive: 6 plays, 66 yards, 2:24.
- PHI – David Akers 23-yard field goal, 6:39. Eagles 27–7. Drive: 10 plays, 55 yards, 5:36.
- MIN – Marcus Robinson 32-yard pass from Daunte Culpepper (Morten Andersen kick), 1:59. Eagles 27–14. Drive: 12 plays, 80 yards, 4:40.

Top passers

- MIN – Daunte Culpepper – 24/46, 316 yards, TD, 2 INT
- PHI – Donovan McNabb – 21/33, 286 yards, 2 TD

Top rushers

- MIN – Michael Bennett – 8 rushes, 37 yards
- PHI – Brian Westbrook – 12 rushes, 70 yards

Top receivers

- MIN – Marcus Robinson – 5 receptions, 119 yards, TD
- PHI – Freddie Mitchell – 5 receptions, 65 yards, TD

The Eagles advanced to the NFC Championship Game for the fourth straight year on the strength of quarterback Donovan McNabb (21 out of 33 completions for 286 yards and 2 touchdowns). Meanwhile, the Vikings repeatedly shot themselves in the foot with penalties (including 3 pass interference calls for 78 yards), turnovers (including two third quarter interceptions), and other miscues. The most notable was a blown fake field goal attempt which failed because they did not send the right personnel onto the field.

Midway through the first quarter, Darren Bennett's 24-yard punt gave the Eagles a first down on their own 47-yard line. McNabb then completed passes to running back Brian Westbrook for gains of 10 and 24 yards as he led the team 53 yards in 7 plays to score the first points of the game with a 2-yard touchdown pass to Freddie Mitchell. The next time the Eagles got the ball, McNabb completed a 52-yard pass to receiver Greg Lewis, setting up his second touchdown pass on a 7-yard toss to Westbrook to complete a 92-yard drive. Mewelde Moore returned the ensuing kickoff 39 yards to his own 42-yard line, and two plays later, Vikings quarterback Daunte Culpepper threw a 40-yard completion to Marcus Robinson. After that, he finished the drive with a 7-yard touchdown run, cutting the score to 14–7. But the Eagles struck right back on their next drive. First, J. R. Reed returned the kickoff 48 yards to the Vikings 46-yard line. After two penalties against Minnesota gave them 33 yards, McNabb completed two passes to tight end L. J. Smith. Smith fumbled the ball on the second pass, but Mitchell recovered it in the end zone for a touchdown, increasing the Eagles' lead to 21–7.

The Vikings responded with a drive to Philadelphia's 3-yard line. On fourth down, coach Mike Tice called a fake field goal that was supposed to involve backup quarterback Gus Frerotte passing the ball. But the lineman next to the long snapper didn't hear the call. He remained in and Randy Moss, who was supposed to receive the pass, had to run off the field to avoid a penalty. When the ball was snapped, a confused Frerotte had no receivers to pass too, and was forced to throw the ball away. The Eagles then drove 93 yards the Vikings 4-yard line, but were unable to stop the clock from running out before they could score.

After forcing Philadelphia to punt on the opening second half possession, Minnesota drove to the Eagles 28-yard, only to lose the ball on an interception by Ike Reese. The next time the Vikings got the ball, they fared no better, as Culpepper threw a pass that was intercepted by linebacker Jeremiah Trotter, who returned it 35 yards to the Minnesota 31-yard line. On the following play, Minnesota got the ball back as Brian Russell forced a fumble from Mitchell after he caught a 30-yard pass and was headed for the goal line. Cornerback Terrance Shaw recovered it in the end zone for a touchdown, and the Vikings drove to a first down on the Eagles 19-yard line. But after an incompletion and a run for no gain, defensive back Brian Dawkins sacked Culpepper for a 12-yard loss, and his subsequent pass attempt to convert the 4th and 22 was incomplete. Philadelphia then took advantage of a 46-yard pass interference penalty against Vikings corner Ralph Brown, scoring on David Akers' 21-yard field goal to go up 24–7. Then after a Vikings punt, the Eagles drove 55 yards in 10 plays to make the score 27–7 with Akers' 23-yard kick. The Vikings managed to respond with an 80-yard drive capped by Culpepper's 32-yard touchdown pass to Robinson, but they could not recover the onside kick and the Eagles ran out the rest of the clock.

Culpepper threw for 354 yards and 1 touchdown, but was intercepted twice. Robinson caught five passes for 119 yards and a touchdown. Westbrook rushed for 70 yards and caught five passes for 47 yards and a touchdown.

This was the second postseason meeting between the Vikings and Eagles. Philadelphia won the only prior meeting.

Previous playoff games
Philadelphia leads 1–0 in all-time playoff games

1980

Minnesota Vikings 16 @ Philadelphia Eagles 31

1980 NFC Divisional playoffs

==== AFC: New England Patriots 20, Indianapolis Colts 3 ====
Indianapolis Colts vs. New England Patriots – Game summary

Quarter	1	2	3	4	Total
Colts	0	3	0	0	3
Patriots	0	6	7	7	20

at Gillette Stadium, Foxborough, Massachusetts

- Game time: 4:30 p.m. EST
- Game weather: 25 °F (−4 °C), cloudy, snow
- Game attendance: 68,756
- Referee: Bill Carollo
- TV announcers (CBS): Jim Nantz (play-by-play), Phil Simms (color commentator), and Bonnie Bernstein (sideline reporter)

Game information

First quarter

- No scoring plays.

Second quarter

- NE – Adam Vinatieri 24-yard field goal, 10:40. Patriots 3–0. Drive: 16 plays, 78 yards, 9:07.
- NE – Adam Vinatieri 31-yard field goal, 7:56. Patriots 6–0. Drive: 6 plays, 48 yards, 1:26.
- IND – Mike Vanderjagt 23-yard field goal, 0:00. Patriots 6–3. Drive: 11 plays, 67 yards, 1:52.

Third quarter

- NE – David Givens 5-yard pass from Tom Brady (Adam Vinatieri kick), 1:30. Patriots 13–3. Drive: 15 plays, 87 yards, 8:16.

Fourth quarter

- NE – Tom Brady 1-yard run (Adam Vinatieri kick), 7:10. Patriots 20–3. Drive: 14 plays, 94 yards, 7:24.

Top passers

- IND – Peyton Manning – 27/42, 238 yards, TD, INT
- NE – Tom Brady – 18/27, 144 yards, TD

Top rushers

- IND – Edgerrin James – 14 rushes, 39 yards
- NE – Corey Dillon – 23 rushes, 144 yards

Top receivers

- IND – Edgerrin James – 12 receptions, 69 yards
- NE – David Givens – 4 receptions, 26 yards, TD

In a snowstorm, the Patriots dismantled the league's highest scoring team by forcing three turnovers and holding them to just 276 yards and 3 points, their lowest point total since their opening game of the 2003 season. Peyton Manning suffered his seventh loss in Foxborough, even though he had more yards passing than Brady did in the game. The Patriots limited Manning to 238 passing yards with 1 interception and no touchdowns, and Edgerrin James to just 39 rushing yards. Meanwhile, Brady had two total touchdowns and no interceptions. The Patriots also held possession of the ball for 37:43, including 21:26 in the second half and recording three long scoring drives that each took over 7 minutes off the clock. New England running back Corey Dillon, playing in his first career playoff game after suffering through 7 losing seasons as a member of the Cincinnati Bengals, rushed for 144 yards and caught 5 passes for 17 yards.

Both teams defenses dominated early, as the first five possessions of the game ended in punts. But after that, the Patriots put together a 16-play, 78 yards scoring drive that took 9:07 off the clock. They lost a touchdown when Dillons' 1-yard score was overturned by a penalty, but Adam Vinatieri kicked a 24-yard field goal to give them a 3–0 lead. The next time New England got the ball, a 42-yard run by Dillon set up another Vinatieri field goal, increasing the Patriots lead to 6–0. The Colts responded with a drive to New England's 39-yard line, but linebacker Tedy Bruschi ended it by forcing and recovering a fumble from running back Dominic Rhodes. After a Patriots punt, Manning led the Colts 67 yards to a Mike Vanderjagt field goal, cutting the score to 6–3 going into halftime.

But the Patriots dominated the second half, holding the ball for nearly all the time in regulation with two long drives. After a criticized Indianapolis punt on 4th and 1 from the New England 49-yard line, the Patriots drove 87 yards in 15 plays on a drive that consumed 8:16 and ended with Brady's 5-yard touchdown pass to David Givens. At the end of the Colts next drive, Hunter Smith's 54-yard punt pinned New England back at their own 6-yard line. But it didn't stop them. The Patriots stormed down the field on a 14-play, 94-yard drive that ate up another 7:24. Dillon rushed for 35 yards and caught a pass for 9 on the drive, including a 27-yard run on third down and 8, while Brady finished it with a 1-yard touchdown run, giving the Patriots a 20–3 lead with just over 7 minutes left in the game. Then two plays after the ensuing kickoff, safety Rodney Harrison stripped the ball from Reggie Wayne and Bruschi recovered it, allowing his team to take more time off the clock. Indianapolis responded with a drive to the Patriots 20-yard line, but Harrison intercepted Manning's pass in the end zone with 10 seconds left.

This was the second postseason meeting between the Colts and Patriots. New England won the only previous meeting the year prior.

Previous playoff games
New England leads 1–0 in all-time playoff games

2003

Indianapolis Colts 14 @ New England Patriots 24

2003 AFC Championship Game

== Conference championships ==
=== Sunday, January 23, 2005 ===
==== NFC: Philadelphia Eagles 27, Atlanta Falcons 10 ====
Atlanta Falcons vs. Philadelphia Eagles – Game summary

Quarter	1	2	3	4	Total
Falcons	0	10	0	0	10
Eagles	7	7	6	7	27

at Lincoln Financial Field, Philadelphia, Pennsylvania

- Game time: 3:00 p.m. EST
- Game weather: 17 °F (−8 °C), partly sunny
- Game attendance: 67,717
- Referee: Bill Carollo
- TV announcers (Fox): Joe Buck (play-by-play), Troy Aikman, Cris Collinsworth (color commentators), Pam Oliver, and Chris Myers (sideline reporters)

Game information

First quarter

- PHI – Dorsey Levens 4-yard run (David Akers kick), 4:16. Eagles 7–0. Drive: 6 plays, 70 yards, 3:09.

Second quarter

- ATL – Jay Feely 23-yard field goal, 10:19. Eagles 7–3. Drive: 17 plays, 64 yards, 8:57.
- PHI – Chad Lewis 3-yard pass from Donovan McNabb (David Akers kick), 4:58. Eagles 14–3. Drive: 9 plays, 72 yards, 5:21.
- ATL – Warrick Dunn 10-yard run (Jay Feely kick), 2:02. Eagles 14–10. Drive: 5 plays, 70 yards, 2:56.

Third quarter

- PHI – David Akers 31-yard field goal, 8:55. Eagles 17–10. Drive: 11 plays, 60 yards, 6:05.
- PHI – David Akers 34-yard field goal, 2:00. Eagles 20–10. Drive: 4 plays, –5 yards, 0:56.

Fourth quarter

- PHI – Chad Lewis 2-yard pass from Donovan McNabb (David Akers kick), 3:21. Eagles 27–10. Drive: 11 plays, 65 yards, 6:53.

Top passers

- ATL – Michael Vick – 11/24, 136 yards, INT
- PHI – Donovan McNabb – 17/26, 180 yards, 2 TD

Top rushers

- ATL – Warrick Dunn – 15 rushes, 59 yards, TD
- PHI – Brian Westbrook – 16 rushes, 96 yards

Top receivers

- ATL – Alge Crumpler – 4 receptions, 49 yards
- PHI – Greg Lewis – 2 receptions, 65 yards

The Eagles finally succeeded in advancing to the Super Bowl in their fourth straight NFC Championship Game appearance. The Eagles' defense held Michael Vick to a combined total of 162 yards, sacking him four times. Tight end Chad Lewis caught two touchdown passes of three and two yards from Donovan McNabb; however, he suffered a Lisfranc injury to his foot in the process of catching the second touchdown, and would miss the Super Bowl.

On their first drive of the game, the Eagles drove to Atlanta's 32-yard line. But they turned the ball over after trying to convert a fourth down with a fake field goal attempt. The next time they got the ball, a 36-yard run by Brian Westbrook and a 21-yard catch by L. J. Smith set up a 4-yard touchdown run by Dorsey Levens, giving them a 7–0 lead. Atlanta responded with a drive to the Eagles 3-yard line, but was forced to settle for a Jay Feely field goal after Vick was sacked by Hollis Thomas on third down. Six plays after the ensuing kickoff, Greg Lewis' 45-yard reception moved the ball to the Falcons 4-yard line, setting up McNabb's 3-yard touchdown pass to Chad Lewis one play later. Atlanta struck right back on their next drive, moving the ball 70 yards in just five plays, one a 31-yard reception by tight end Alge Crumpler, and scoring with Warrick Dunn's 10-yard touchdown run with 21 seconds left in the first half.

The Eagles dominated the second half, forcing Atlanta to punt on every possession except one which resulted in an interception, and their last one, which ended when they turned the ball over on downs. Meanwhile, Eagles kicker David Akers kicked two field goals, one after a 60-yard drive to start the second half, and another set up by Brian Dawkins' 19-yard interception return to the Falcons 11-yard line. A 65-yard drive in the fourth quarter, featuring McNabb's 20-yard pass to Chad Lewis, resulted in the final score of the game; McNabb's 2-yard touchdown toss to Chad Lewis with 3:21 left in regulation.

McNabb threw for 180 yards and two touchdowns, while also rushing for 32 yards. Westbrook rushed for 96 yards and caught five passes for 39. Atlanta cornerback Allen Rossum returned 4 kickoffs for 102 yards and 2 punts for 20.

This was the third postseason meeting between the Falcons and Eagles. Both teams split the prior two meetings.

Previous playoff games
Tied 1–1 in all-time playoff games

1978

Philadelphia Eagles 13 @ Atlanta Falcons 14

1978 NFC Wild Card playoffs

2002

Atlanta Falcons 6 @ Philadelphia Eagles 20

2002 NFC Divisional playoffs

==== AFC: New England Patriots 41, Pittsburgh Steelers 27 ====
New England Patriots vs. Pittsburgh Steelers – Game summary

Quarter	1	2	3	4	Total
Patriots	10	14	7	10	41
Steelers	3	0	14	10	27

at Heinz Field, Pittsburgh, Pennsylvania

- Game time: 6:30 p.m. EST
- Game weather: 11 °F (−12 °C), fair
- Game attendance: 65,242
- Referee: Walt Anderson
- TV announcers (CBS): Jim Nantz (play-by-play), Phil Simms (color commentator), Bonnie Bernstein, and Armen Keteyian (sideline reporters)

Game information

First quarter

- NE – Adam Vinatieri 48-yard field goal, 11:20. Patriots 3–0. Drive: 5 plays, 18 yards, 2:13.
- NE – Deion Branch 60-yard pass from Tom Brady (Adam Vinatieri kick), 6:49. Patriots 10–0. Drive: 1 play, 60 yards, 0:09.

Second quarter

- PIT – Jeff Reed 43-yard field goal, 1:22. Patriots 10–3. Drive: 5 plays, 23 yards, 2:10.
- NE – David Givens 9-yard pass from Tom Brady (Adam Vinatieri kick), 7:08. Patriots 17–3. Drive: 5 plays, 70 yards, 2:52.
- NE – Rodney Harrison 87-yard interception return (Adam Vinatieri kick), 2:14. Patriots 24–3.

Third quarter

- PIT – Jerome Bettis 5-yard run (Jeff Reed kick), 10:54. Patriots 24–10. Drive: 5 plays, 56 yards, 2:39.
- NE – Corey Dillon 25-yard run (Adam Vinatieri kick), 7:27. Patriots 31–10. Drive: 7 plays, 69 yards, 3:27.
- PIT – Hines Ward 30-yard pass from Ben Roethlisberger (Jeff Reed kick), 2:35. Patriots 31–17. Drive: 10 plays, 60 yards, 4:52.

Fourth quarter

- PIT – Jeff Reed 20-yard field goal, 13:29. Patriots 31–20. Drive: 6 plays, 53 yards, 2:14.
- NE – Adam Vinatieri 31-yard field goal, 8:03. Patriots 34–20. Drive: 10 plays, 49 yards, 5:26.
- NE – Deion Branch 23-yard run (Adam Vinatieri kick), 2:23. Patriots 41–20. Drive: 10 plays, 55 yards, 5:06.
- PIT – Plaxico Burress 7-yard pass from Ben Roethlisberger (Jeff Reed kick), 0:52. Patriots 41–27. Drive: 6 plays, 61 yards, 1:31.

Top passers

- NE – Tom Brady – 14/21, 207 yards, 2 TD
- PIT – Ben Roethlisberger – 14/24, 226 yards, 2 TD, 3 INT

Top rushers

- NE – Corey Dillon – 24 rushes, 73 yards
- PIT – Jerome Bettis – 17 rushes, 64 yards, TD

Top receivers

- NE – Deion Branch – 4 receptions, 116 yards, TD
- PIT – Hines Ward – 5 receptions, 109 yards, TD

The game-time temperature of 11 °F (−12 °C) made it the second-coldest game ever in Pittsburgh and the coldest ever in Steel City playoff annals. However, it was the Patriots that handed Ben Roethlisberger his first loss as a starter after a 14-game winning streak, the longest by a rookie quarterback in NFL history, as the Steelers became the second NFL team ever to record a 15–1 record and fail to reach the Super Bowl. The Patriots converted four Pittsburgh turnovers into 24 points, while committing no turnovers themselves. The Patriots' win also prevented an all-Pennsylvania Super Bowl from being played.

The Steelers never recovered from their poor performance in the first quarter. Patriots safety Eugene Wilson intercepted Roethlisberger's first pass of the game on his own 48-yard line, setting up Adam Vinatieri's 48-yard field goal to take a 3–0 lead. Pittsburgh responded with a drive to the Patriots 39-yard line. But then running back Jerome Bettis lost a fumble while being tackled by Rosevelt Colvin and linebacker Mike Vrabel recovered it. On the next play, Tom Brady threw a 60-yard touchdown pass to receiver Deion Branch.

Later on, the Steelers took advantage of Josh Miller's 27-yard punt that gave them the ball on their own 48-yard line. Roethlisberger completed a 19-yard pass to Hines Ward on the next play, setting up Jeff Reed's 43-yard field goal that cut the score to 10–3 with 1:26 left in the first quarter. But after an exchange of punts, Branch caught a 45-yard reception on Pittsburgh's 14-yard line. Two plays later, Brady threw a 9-yard touchdown pass to David Givens. Then on the Steelers ensuing drive, safety Rodney Harrison intercepted a pass from Roethlisberger and returned it 87 yards for a touchdown, giving the Patriots a 24–3 halftime lead.

In the second half, the teams scored three consecutive touchdowns. New England was forced to punt on the opening drive of the third quarter, and Antwaan Randle El returned the ball 9 yards to the Steelers 44-yard line. Then on the Steelers ensuing possession, he caught two passes for 46 yards as they drove 56 yards in five plays. Bettis finished the drive with a 5-yard touchdown run, cutting their deficit to 24–10. New England responded by moving the ball 69 yards in seven plays and scoring with Corey Dillon's 25-yard touchdown run. But Pittsburgh stormed right back, driving 60 yards in ten plays and scoring with Roethlisberger's 30-yard touchdown pass to Ward. Then after forcing a punt, Randle El returned the ball 22 yards to the Steelers 49-yard line. On their ensuing drive, Ward's 26-yard reception on the last play of the third quarter set up Reed's second field goal, making the score 31–20 with 13:32 left in the game.

However, the Patriots took over the rest of the quarter. They responded with a 49-yard drive that took 5:26 off the clock and ended with Vinatieri's 31-yard field goal. Then two plays after the ensuing kickoff, Wilson intercepted another pass from Roethlisberger at New England's 45-yard line. The Patriots subsequently marched down the field on another long scoring drive, taking 5:06 off the clock. Branch capped it off with a 23-yard touchdown run on a reverse play, giving the Patriots a 41–20 lead. The Steelers responded with Roethlisberger's 7-yard touchdown pass to Plaxico Burress on their next drive, but by then there was only 1:31 left in the game.

Brady completed 14 of 21 passes for 207 yards and 2 touchdowns. Dillon rushed for 73 yards and a touchdown. Branch caught 4 passes for 116 yards, rushed for 37 yards, and scored two touchdowns. Roethlisberger threw for 226 yards and 2 touchdowns, and rushed for 45 yards, but was intercepted 3 times. Ward caught 5 passes for 109 yards and a touchdown.

This was the fourth postseason meeting between the Patriots and Steelers. New England had won two of the prior three meetings.

Previous playoff games
New England leads 2–1 in all-time playoff games

1996

Pittsburgh Steelers 3 @ New England Patriots 28

1996 AFC Divisional playoffs

1997

New England Patriots 6 @ Pittsburgh Steelers 7

1997 AFC Divisional playoffs

2001

New England Patriots 24 @ Pittsburgh Steelers 17

2001 AFC Championship Game

== Super Bowl XXXIX: New England Patriots 24, Philadelphia Eagles 21 ==
Super Bowl XXXIX – New England Patriots vs. Philadelphia Eagles – Game summary

Quarter	1	2	3	4	Total
Patriots (AFC)	0	7	7	10	24
Eagles (NFC)	0	7	7	7	21

at Alltel Stadium, Jacksonville, Florida

- Date: February 6, 2005
- Game attendance: 78,125
- Referee: Terry McAulay
- TV announcers (Fox): Joe Buck (play-by-play), Troy Aikman, Cris Collinsworth (color commentators), Pam Oliver and Chris Myers (sideline reporters)

This was the first Super Bowl meeting between the Patriots and Eagles.
