= 2004 Philadelphia Eagles season =

72nd season in franchise history; second overall Super Bowl appearance

- Owner: Jeffrey Lurie
- General manager: Andy Reid
- Head coach: Andy Reid
- Home stadium: Lincoln Financial Field

Results
- Record: 13–3
- Division place: 1st NFC East
- Playoffs: Won Divisional Playoffs (vs. Vikings) 27–14; Won NFC Championship (vs. Falcons) 27–10; Lost Super Bowl XXXIX (vs. Patriots) 21–24
- All-Pros: WR Terrell Owens (1st team); CB Lito Sheppard (1st team); FS Brian Dawkins (1st team); K David Akers (2nd team)
- Pro Bowlers: QB Donovan McNabb; RB Brian Westbrook; WR Terrell Owens; OT Tra Thomas; LB Jeremiah Trotter; CB Lito Sheppard; FS Brian Dawkins; SS Michael Lewis; K David Akers; ST Ike Reese

The 2004 season was the Philadelphia Eagles' 72nd in the National Football League (NFL). The Eagles entered the season as back-to-back-to-back NFC runner ups and had been one of the most successful teams in the league after the Andy Reid and Donovan McNabb era began in 1999, making it to the playoffs for four straight seasons and to the NFC Championship Game in 2001, 2002, and 2003. However, the team could not reach the Super Bowl in any of those years, despite being favored in the latter two NFC title games. In the offseason, this already championship-level team was reinforced on both sides of the ball by the free agent additions of wide receiver Terrell Owens, defensive end Jevon Kearse and return of middle linebacker Jeremiah Trotter, their third-round draft pick in 1998.

Possessing a high-powered offense which featured McNabb, Owens, and Brian Westbrook, as well as a bruising defense led by Pro Bowlers Jeremiah Trotter, Brian Dawkins, Lito Sheppard and Michael Lewis, they won their way to a 13–1 start to the season. After resting starters for the final two games, the 13–3 Eagles (the best record in the Reid era) soared past the Minnesota Vikings and the Atlanta Falcons in the playoffs, earning a trip to Super Bowl XXXIX in Jacksonville against the defending champion New England Patriots. The Eagles fell 24–21, ending their season. This season was considered the franchise's most successful in the modern era until their Super Bowl LII-winning 2017 season–coincidentally, the Eagles also faced the Falcons, Vikings, and Patriots in the 2017 playoffs.

The 2004 Eagles were the last team to repeat as NFC East champions until the 2025 Eagles. The 2004 Eagles were also the last team to go 6–0 against NFC East rivals until the Dallas Cowboys in 2021. It would be the last season where the Eagles won their first seven games until 18 years later.

== Offseason ==
=== Acquisitions ===
The Eagles signed defensive end Jevon Kearse, linebacker Dhani Jones and quarterback Jeff Blake in free agency. The Eagles also acquired wide receiver Terrell Owens in a trade.

The Eagles also brought back defensive end Hugh Douglas and middle linebacker Jeremiah Trotter after they were released by their previous teams.

=== Departures ===
The Eagles traded guard John Welbourn to the Kansas City Chiefs, quarterback A.J. Feeley to the Miami Dolphins, defensive end Brandon Whiting to the San Francisco 49ers and wide receiver James Thrash to the Washington Redskins.

In free agency, the Eagles lost linebacker Carlos Emmons, cornerbacks Troy Vincent and Bobby Taylor, running back Duce Staley, defensive end Marco Coleman and guard Bobbie Williams.

=== Draft ===
2004 Philadelphia Eagles draft
| Round | Pick | Player | Position | College | Notes |
| 1 | 16 | Shawn Andrews * | G | Arkansas | |
| 3 | 90 | Matt Ware | FS | UCLA | |
| 4 | 129 | J. R. Reed | FS | South Florida | |
| 4 | 131 | Trey Darilek | G | UTEP | |
| 5 | 162 | Thomas Tapeh | FB | Minnesota | |
| 6 | 185 | Andy Hall | QB | Delaware | |
| 6 | 192 | Dexter Wynn | CB | Colorado State | |
| 7 | 227 | Adrien Clarke | G | Ohio State | |
| 7 | 242 | Bruce Perry | RB | Maryland | |
| 7 | 243 | Dominic Furio | C | UNLV | |
Made roster † Pro Football Hall of Fame * Made at least one Pro Bowl during career

== Staff ==
2004 Philadelphia Eagles staff
| Front office: Chairman/Chief Executive Officer – Jeffrey Lurie; President – Joe Banner; Executive vice president of football operations – Andy Reid; Vice president of player personnel – Tom Heckert; Assistant director of player personnel – Jason Licht; Director of pro personnel – Scott Cohen; Head coaches: Head coach – Andy Reid; Assistant head coach – Marty Mornhinweg; Assistant to the head coach – James Urban; Offensive coaches: Offensive coordinator – Brad Childress; Quarterbacks – Pat Shurmur; Running backs – Ted Williams; Wide receivers – David Culley; Tight ends – Tom Melvin; Offensive line – Juan Castillo; Offensive assistant/quality control – Bill Shuey; Statistical analysis coordinator – Mike Frazier | Defensive coaches: Defensive coordinator – Jim Johnson; Defensive line – Tommy Brasher; Linebackers – Steve Spagnuolo; Secondary – Trent Walters; Safeties – Sean McDermott; Defensive assistant/quality control – Mike Reed; Special teams coaches: Special teams coordinator – John Harbaugh; Special teams quality control – Ted Daisher; Strength and conditioning: Head athletic trainer – Rick Burkholder; Strength and conditioning – Mike Wolf; Assistant strength and conditioning – Tom Kanavy; Assistant trainer – Eric Sugarman |

== Roster ==
Philadelphia Eagles 2004 final roster
| Quarterbacks: 11 Jeff Blake; 10 Koy Detmer; 5 Donovan McNabb; Running backs: 25 Dorsey Levens; 34 Reno Mahe; 22 Eric McCoo; 49 Josh Parry FB; 36 Brian Westbrook; Wide receivers: 83 Greg Lewis; 80 Billy McMullen; 84 Freddie Mitchell; 81 Terrell Owens; 87 Todd Pinkston; Tight ends: 89 Chad Lewis; 82 L. J. Smith | Offensive linemen: 79 Ian Allen LT; 66 Trey Darilek G; 76 Alonzo Ephraim C; 63 Hank Fraley C; 77 Artis Hicks G; 71 Jermane Mayberry G; 69 Jon Runyan RT; 68 Steve Sciullo G; 72 Tra Thomas LT; Defensive linemen: 56 Derrick Burgess DE; 53 Hugh Douglas DE; 96 Paul Grasmanis DT; 65 Jamaal Green DE; 93 Jevon Kearse DE; 95 Jerome McDougle DE; 91 Sam Rayburn DT; 90 Corey Simon DT; 78 Hollis Thomas DT; 97 Darwin Walker DT | Linebackers: 57 Keith Adams OLB; 55 Dhani Jones OLB; 59 Mike Labinjo MLB; 58 Ike Reese OLB; 50 Mark Simoneau OLB; 54 Jeremiah Trotter MLB; 51 Nate Wayne OLB; Defensive backs: 24 Sheldon Brown CB; 20 Brian Dawkins FS; 29 Roderick Hood CB; 32 Michael Lewis SS; 46 Quintin Mikell SS; 30 J. R. Reed FS; 26 Lito Sheppard CB; 21 Matt Ware CB; 31 Dexter Wynn CB; Special teams: 2 David Akers K; 88 Mike Bartrum LS; 8 Dirk Johnson P | Reserve lists: 73 Shawn Andrews G (IR); 28 Correll Buckhalter RB (IR); 61 Adrien Clarke G (IR); 75 Dominic Furio C (IR); 67 Jamaal Jackson C (IR); 94 N. D. Kalu DE (IR); 35 Bruce Perry RB (IR); 48 Jon Ritchie FB (IR); 52 Jason Short OLB (IR); 41 Thomas Tapeh FB (IR); Practice squad: 9 Andy Hall QB; 74 Branden Hall G; 16 Justin Jenkins WR; 17 Carlos Perez WR; 62 Ifo Pili DT; 86 Casey Poppinga TE; 98 Greg Richmond LB; 64 Drew Strojny RT; rookies in italics Roster updated 2023-02-01; 53 Active, 10 Inactive, 8 Practice Squad |

== Preseason ==
| Week | Date | Opponent | Result | Record | Venue | Recap |
|---|---|---|---|---|---|---|
| 1 | August 13 | at New England Patriots | L 6–24 | 0–1 | Gillette Stadium | Recap |
| 2 | August 20 | Baltimore Ravens | W 26–17 | 1–1 | Lincoln Financial Field | Recap |
| 3 | August 26 | Pittsburgh Steelers | L 21–27 | 1–2 | Lincoln Financial Field | Recap |
| 4 | September 3 | at New York Jets | L 27–28 | 1–3 | Giants Stadium | Recap |

== Regular season ==
=== Schedule ===
| Week | Date | Opponent | Result | Record | Venue | Recap |
|---|---|---|---|---|---|---|
| 1 | September 12 | **New York Giants** | **W** 31–17 | 1–0 | Lincoln Financial Field | Recap |
| 2 | September 20 | Minnesota Vikings | **W** 27–16 | 2–0 | Lincoln Financial Field | Recap |
| 3 | September 26 | at Detroit Lions | **W** 30–13 | 3–0 | Ford Field | Recap |
| 4 | October 3 | at Chicago Bears | **W** 19–9 | 4–0 | Soldier Field | Recap |
| 5 | Bye | | | | | |
| 6 | October 17 | Carolina Panthers | **W** 30–8 | 5–0 | Lincoln Financial Field | Recap |
| 7 | October 24 | at Cleveland Browns | **W** 34–31 (OT) | 6–0 | Cleveland Browns Stadium | Recap |
| 8 | October 31 | Baltimore Ravens | **W** 15–10 | 7–0 | Lincoln Financial Field | Recap |
| 9 | November 7 | at Pittsburgh Steelers | **L** 3–27 | 7–1 | Heinz Field | Recap |
| 10 | November 15 | at **Dallas Cowboys** | **W** 49–21 | 8–1 | Texas Stadium | Recap |
| 11 | November 21 | **Washington Redskins** | **W** 28–6 | 9–1 | Lincoln Financial Field | Recap |
| 12 | November 28 | at **New York Giants** | **W** 27–6 | 10–1 | Giants Stadium | Recap |
| 13 | December 5 | Green Bay Packers | **W** 47–17 | 11–1 | Lincoln Financial Field | Recap |
| 14 | December 12 | at **Washington Redskins** | **W** 17–14 | 12–1 | FedExField | Recap |
| 15 | December 19 | **Dallas Cowboys** | **W** 12–7 | 13–1 | Lincoln Financial Field | Recap |
| 16 | December 27 | at St. Louis Rams | **L** 7–20 | 13–2 | Edward Jones Dome | Recap |
| 17 | January 2 | Cincinnati Bengals | **L** 10–38 | 13–3 | Lincoln Financial Field | Recap |

Note: Intra-division opponents are in bold text.

=== Game summaries ===
==== Week 1: vs. New York Giants ====
| | 1 | 2 | 3 | 4 | Total |
|---|---|---|---|---|---|
| Giants | 7 | 3 | 0 | 7 | **17** |
| **Eagles** | 14 | 10 | 7 | 0 | **31** |

weather= 77 °F (25 °C) (Sunny) The highly anticipated Eagles' season began with a convincing rout of the division-rival New York Giants in a game that was not as close as the 31–17 score. New York scored the first points when Ron Dayne finished a first quarter drive with a 3-yard touchdown run. Then it was all Eagles for a while. Brian Westbrook's 50-yard run was followed up by a 20-yard touchdown pass from Donovan McNabb to his new weapon – Terrell Owens. McNabb acrobatically scrambled and threw for Owens in the end zone on the Eagles' next possession, and it was 14–7 Philadelphia. In the second quarter, the Eagles added a touchdown reception from tight end L.J. Smith and a 45-yard David Akers field goal to take a commanding 24–7 lead. Steve Christie booted a 53-yarder before the half, but in the third quarter, McNabb found Owens surprisingly wide open in the end zone, making it 31–10. Tiki Barber ran for a long touchdown late in the game to make the score more respectable for New York. Rookie Giant quarterback Eli Manning was put in the game for New York's last possession, but he was rocked hard by the Eagles' defense as he was christened into the NFL. McNabb threw for 330 yards and four scores, while Owens did not disappoint in his Philadelphia debut, hauling in three touchdowns. The only negative for the Eagles was the loss of rookie starting offensive guard Shawn Andrews.

==== Week 2: vs. Minnesota Vikings ====
| | 1 | 2 | 3 | 4 | Total |
|---|---|---|---|---|---|
| Vikings | 3 | 3 | 3 | 7 | **16** |
| **Eagles** | 7 | 3 | 7 | 10 | **27** |

weather= 63 °F (17 °C) (Clear) A Monday Night Football matchup against the Minnesota Vikings was touted as a potential playoff preview. A war of words between outspoken receivers Terrell Owens and Randy Moss dominated the media coverage during the week prior to the game. A 22-yard reception by Moss helped Minnesota take a 3–0 early lead. Donovan McNabb marched the Eagles down the field on their first possession and finished the drive with an 11-yard touchdown pass to L.J. Smith. The Vikings drove the ball and had first and goal from the Eagles' 2-yard line, but the defense made a goal-line stand, holding the Vikings to another field goal. David Akers capped the Eagles' next possession with a 37-yard field goal, making it 10–6 Philadelphia. Later in the quarter, the Vikings again had first and goal from the Eagles 2-yard line, but linebacker Mark Simoneau met Daunte Culpepper at the goal line and stripped him, with Brian Dawkins recovering the fumble. McNabb bootlegged for a 20-yard touchdown in the third quarter to give the Eagles breathing room. Morten Andersen kicked his third field goal to make it 17–9. However, McNabb found Owens deep for a 34-yard touchdown, increasing the Philadelphia lead to 24–9. Moss scored a late-touchdown on a short fade route, but the night belonged to the Eagles. McNabb passed for 245 yards and two scores, while running for another, and the defense allowed only one touchdown to the highly regarded Minnesota offense. The 27–16 win allowed Philadelphia to seize early control of their division and established them as the team to beat in the NFC.

==== Week 3: at Detroit Lions ====
| | 1 | 2 | 3 | 4 | Total |
|---|---|---|---|---|---|
| **Eagles** | 14 | 7 | 6 | 3 | **30** |
| Lions | 0 | 7 | 0 | 6 | **13** |

With two home wins under their belt, the Eagles played their first away game of the year at Ford Field against the lowly Detroit Lions. The Eagles broke through during the first quarter when Donovan McNabb arced a 48-yard bomb to third receiver Freddie Mitchell setting up a first and goal. McNabb finished the drive with a 1-yard quarterback sneak. After recovering a Detroit fumble, McNabb hit Terrell Owens in stride for a 29-yard score. The next touchdown was scored by long-snapper/tight end Mike Bartrum on a 1-yard pass, his first touchdown since 2001, making it 21–0 Eagles. Emerging Detroit receiver Roy Williams had two touchdown receptions over the rest of the game, but three second half field goals by David Akers kept the score a lopsided 30–13. McNabb had 356 passing yards, with Owens owning 107 of those yards.

==== Week 4: at Chicago Bears ====
| | 1 | 2 | 3 | 4 | Total |
|---|---|---|---|---|---|
| **Eagles** | 3 | 13 | 3 | 0 | **19** |
| Bears | 0 | 3 | 0 | 6 | **9** |

Playing in extraordinarily windy conditions at Soldier Field, the Eagles air attack was somewhat hindered in its 19–9 win over the Chicago Bears. David Akers, facing his most challenging conditions of the season, connected on a 51-yard field goal in the first quarter. He made another field goal in the second quarter to double Philadelphia's lead to 6–0. Capitalizing on a turnover, Donovan McNabb hit his favorite target Terrell Owens for an 11-yard touchdown in the second quarter. With another Akers field goal, the Eagles led 16–0. The Bears got on the board with a field goal before the half ended, but Akers' fourth field goal made it 19–3. Akers missed his next two field goals in the increasingly windy conditions, but the Eagles hung on for the 19–9 victory. Brian Westbrook had a career-high 23 rushes for 115 yards and Owens caught his sixth touchdown in just four games. With the victory, the Eagles completed a four-game sweep of their schedule preceding their Week 5 bye.

==== Week 6: vs. Carolina Panthers ====
| | 1 | 2 | 3 | 4 | Total |
|---|---|---|---|---|---|
| Panthers | 0 | 0 | 0 | 8 | **8** |
| **Eagles** | 10 | 3 | 10 | 7 | **30** |

weather= 56 °F (13 °C) (Mostly Cloudy) Undefeated and fresh off of an early season bye, the Eagles sought to take revenge against a wounded Carolina Panthers team that had beaten them in the 2003 NFC Championship Game. A long kick return by J.R. Reed set up a 48-yard field goal by David Akers to begin things for the Eagles. A 53-yard catch and run to Terrell Owens led to a 1-yard plunge by veteran running back Dorsey Levens. Another long completion to Owens set the stage for another field goal, and it was 13–0 Eagles. Akers kicked his third field goal in the third quarter before Lito Sheppard's exciting 64-yard interception return for a touchdown. Panthers quarterback Jake Delhomme, who was picked off four times by the Eagles defense, threw a late-touchdown to Muhsin Muhammad. However, Brian Westbrook answered right back with a 42-yard scamper to the end zone, his first touchdown of the year, which made it 30–8. Despite failing to catch a touchdown reception for the first time all season, Owens had 123 receiving yards and the Eagles were 5–0.

==== Week 7: at Cleveland Browns ====
| | 1 | 2 | 3 | 4 | OT | Total |
|---|---|---|---|---|---|---|
| **Eagles** | 14 | 7 | 0 | 10 | 3 | **34** |
| Browns | 7 | 10 | 7 | 7 | 0 | **31** |

After five relatively easy wins, the Eagles were drawn into a dogfight against the Cleveland Browns. The Browns were led by quarterback Jeff Garcia, former teammate to Terrell Owens. The Eagles roared to an early lead when Donovan McNabb completed a 65-yard bomb to Todd Pinkston before a 10-yard strike to veteran tight end Chad Lewis. Cleveland answered the Eagles with a touchdown, but McNabb struck quickly again on his next possession by tossing a 39-yard touchdown to Owens, who fired the football at a Cleveland fan's sign accusing him of having body odor. After a Browns field goal, McNabb found Owens again, this time for 40 yards, and this time with Owens pulling down a sign which implied he was a homosexual. The Eagles were up 21–10, but the Browns did not quit, scoring before the half ended on a Lee Suggs touchdown and after the half on a Garcia touchdown pass to Steve Heiden. Suddenly, the Browns were leading 24–21, the first time the Eagles had trailed in the second half all season. Early in the fourth, McNabb found L.J. Smith in the end zone to retake the lead and after Cleveland fumbled the kickoff, David Akers booted a 38-yarder to make it 31–24. However, the resilient Garcia rushed it into the end zone himself with less than a minute left in regulation, sending the game into overtime. In the overtime, both teams punted before the Eagles, helped by a 28-yard McNabb scramble, got into field goal range. With five minutes left in the overtime, Akers barely cleared the uprights on a 50-yard game-winning kick. McNabb had 376 passing yards and four touchdowns, while Owens and Pinkston each collected over 100 receiving yards. The Eagles went to 6–0 and continued to pull away from the rest of the conference. This was the Eagles first 6–0 start since 1981.

==== Week 8: vs. Baltimore Ravens ====
| | 1 | 2 | 3 | 4 | Total |
|---|---|---|---|---|---|
| Ravens | 3 | 0 | 0 | 7 | **10** |
| **Eagles** | 3 | 3 | 0 | 9 | **15** |

weather= 75 °F (24 °C) (Sunny) The Eagles put their undefeated record on the line at home against the Baltimore Ravens. In what had become a weekly event, controversial receiver Terrell Owens had a war of words in the days leading up to the game, this time against Ravens superstar linebacker Ray Lewis. The game would prove to be a battle between the dominating Philadelphia and Baltimore defenses. Almost right off the bat, Deion Sanders was hit hard by Eagles defenders as he flipped over one and was hit in midair. After getting good field position, David Akers put the Eagles up with a short field goal, but the Ravens matched that before the end of the quarter. A Donovan McNabb fumble near the Baltimore goal line erased a possible scoring chance in the second quarter, but he drove the team to a field goal on the Eagles' next possession. The defenses dominated the third quarter, and the score remained a close 6–3 as the final quarter began. Akers added a field goal early in the quarter, but the Ravens remained less than a touchdown behind. Ravens running back Chester Taylor fumbled in Eagles territory, with Hollis Thomas making the recovery. The Eagles took advantage, ending the possession in an 11-yard third down touchdown pass to Owens, who broke a tackle on his way to the score. The two-point conversion failed, but it was now 15–3 Eagles. The points proved necessary as Kyle Boller completed a touchdown to Daniel Wilcox on Baltimore's next possession. The Philadelphia defense held strong the rest of the game and the Eagles won by a final of 15–10. Owens again had over 100 yards, and scored his ninth touchdown of the year. The Eagles, at 7–0, were off to their best start ever.

==== Week 9: at Pittsburgh Steelers ====
| | 1 | 2 | 3 | 4 | Total |
|---|---|---|---|---|---|
| Eagles | 0 | 3 | 0 | 0 | **3** |
| **Steelers** | 14 | 7 | 3 | 3 | **27** |

In a possible Super Bowl preview, the 7–0 Eagles travelled across the state to take on the 6–1 Pittsburgh Steelers, who had just knocked off the defending champion New England Patriots. However, the Eagles would not have one of their better days in this major test. The Steelers scored early and often, driving two touchdowns on their first three drives. In a rare 21–0 hole, the Eagles offense could only muster a field goal before the end of the half. The offense continued to sputter in the second half, and the Steelers fed the Eagles a steady diet of Jerome Bettis rushes. The final score was an embarrassing 27–3. The Eagles high-octane offense only mustered 113 yards, while the Pittsburgh ground attack amassed 252 yards. Making matters worse, a frustrated Terrell Owens was caught on camera yelling at quarterback Donovan McNabb. After the game, Eagles defensive coordinator Jim Johnson made Jeremiah Trotter the Eagles' starting middle linebacker in an effort to better defend against the run.

==== Week 10: at Dallas Cowboys ====
| | 1 | 2 | 3 | 4 | Total |
|---|---|---|---|---|---|
| **Eagles** | 7 | 28 | 7 | 7 | **49** |
| Cowboys | 0 | 14 | 7 | 0 | **21** |

In a Monday Night Football game that is probably more remembered for a controversial pre-game promotion featuring Terrell Owens and Desperate Housewives actress Nicollette Sheridan, the Eagles avenged their loss to the Steelers by throttling the Dallas Cowboys in Texas Stadium 49–21. On the first play of their third possession, Donovan McNabb completed a pass over the middle to Owens. The two nearest Cowboy defenders ran into each other, freeing Owens to run for a 59-yard touchdown. A muffed punt put the Eagles in position to score their second touchdown on a 4-yard run by Dorsey Levens in the second quarter. A touchdown reception by Dallas tight end Jason Witten cut the Philadelphia lead to 14–7 as the game turned into a shootout. McNabb completed another touchdown to Owens, and then a 59-yarder to Todd Pinkston for Pinkston's first score of the season. Cowboys quarterback Vinny Testaverde found Witten again a few minutes later, making it 28–14 Philadelphia. On the next Eagles' possession, McNabb, in a famous play, scrambled for a record 14.1 seconds before launching a 60-yard bomb to Freddie Mitchell. The drive ended in a 1-yard Brian Westbrook run, padding the Eagles' lead to 35–14. Dallas running back Eddie George scored on the Cowboys' first possession of the third quarter, keeping Dallas in the game. But they would not score again, while McNabb and Owens hooked up for another touchdown. In the fourth quarter, Lito Sheppard intercepted Testaverde in the end zone and went the distance, returning the pick 101 yards for a touchdown as he outran Cowboy receiver Keyshawn Johnson. Owens had his biggest game as an Eagle, catching six passes for 134 yards and three touchdowns. McNabb's equally fantastic season continued with 345 passing yards, four touchdowns, and zero interceptions. The Eagles went to 8–1, with a division title already in sight.

==== Week 11: vs. Washington Redskins ====
| | 1 | 2 | 3 | 4 | Total |
|---|---|---|---|---|---|
| Redskins | 3 | 3 | 0 | 0 | **6** |
| **Eagles** | 7 | 0 | 7 | 14 | **28** |

weather= 54 °F (12 °C) (Cloudy) In Week 11, the Eagles faced the Washington Redskins for the first time all season. Using a steady rushing attack, the Redskins opened the scoring with a 35-yard Ola Kimrin field goal. The Eagles answered back with a touchdown – a 2-yard pass to a wide open Chad Lewis in the end zone. The Redskins got another field goal to make it 7–6, keeping pace with an Eagles team that had a sluggish first half. In the third quarter, the Eagles put together an impressive drive that ended with Donovan McNabb firing a bullet over the middle to Terrell Owens in the end zone. Brian Westbrook added two short yardage receiving touchdowns in the fourth quarter, breaking the game open and making the final score 28–6, prompting the Redskins to accuse the Eagles of running up the score after the game. It was not the Eagles' best offense performance, but McNabb, who fumbled and was intercepted, threw four touchdowns. Overshadowed receiver Todd Pinkston had 106 receiving yards, which led the team.

==== Week 12: at New York Giants ====
| | 1 | 2 | 3 | 4 | Total |
|---|---|---|---|---|---|
| **Eagles** | 0 | 7 | 13 | 7 | **27** |
| Giants | 3 | 3 | 0 | 0 | **6** |

The 9–1 Eagles travelled up the New Jersey Turnpike to take on the New York Giants on November 28, 2004. Eli Manning's 50-yard bomb to Jamaar Taylor allowed New York to take a first quarter lead after a field goal. Donovan McNabb took it in himself as the Eagles' answered with a touchdown. Steve Christie got another field goal in the second quarter, and it was a 7–6 game. McNabb was sacked and fumbled near midfield on the Eagles' next possession. Manning promptly arced another rocket to Taylor, putting the ball on the Philadelphia 3-yard line. On the next play, Manning underthrew a fade to the end zone and rookie Quintin Mikell made a clutch interception. The game was still tight as the second half began, but the Eagles defense would not allow the Giants to score again. Philadelphia used a 24-yard reception by Terrell Owens to set up a 47-yard David Akers field goal. Then, a Brian Dawkins interception of Manning led to another field goal, pushing the Philadelphia lead to 13–6. Later in the quarter, Jevon Kearse blocked a New York punt, and the offense was able to capitalize, with Brian Westbrook taking it in from 1-yard out, and putting the Eagles ahead 20–6. Early in the fourth quarter, Westbrook took a screen from McNabb and rumbled 34 yards to paydirt, breaking the game open at 27–6. Westbrook had 127 combined yards and both a rushing and receiving touchdown. The defense gave up 110 yards to Tiki Barber and two long Manning-Taylor passes, but otherwise kept the Giants muzzled, while making key interceptions. With the victory, the Eagles locked up an NFC East division title earlier than any team had before. They had also won their tenth game quicker than any team in franchise history.

==== Week 13: vs. Green Bay Packers ====
| | 1 | 2 | 3 | 4 | Total |
|---|---|---|---|---|---|
| Packers | 0 | 3 | 0 | 14 | **17** |
| **Eagles** | 7 | 28 | 9 | 3 | **47** |

The Eagles turned in perhaps their best performance of the entire season when the 7–4 Green Bay Packers, who had won six straight, traveled to Lincoln Financial Field ready for revenge after their heartbreaking playoff loss from the previous season. Instead, the game was never competitive at all. The Eagles offense completely gashed the Packers' defense, and Brett Favre could do nothing with the stubborn Eagles' defense. Donovan McNabb continued his hot streak from the previous week's win against the Giants. Having completed his last 10 pass attempts of that game, and his first 14 attempts against the Packers, McNabb became the sole owner of the record for most consecutive passes complete – with 24 over two games. In the first quarter, Terrell Owens broke a tackle and raced away for a 41-yard touchdown. In the second quarter, Donovan McNabb fed Brian Westbrook a short pass that Westbrook took in for a score. On the next series, Westbrook lined up in the slot and beat the coverage as he reeled in a 41-yard touchdown reception. McNabb gave L.J. Smith a turn on the next possession, completing a 6-yard touchdown to him. Dexter Wynn made a big punt return later in the quarter, leading to McNabb finding Westbrook over the middle. It was Westbrook's third touchdown of the quarter, and McNabb's fifth of the half – and the Eagles were leading the Packers 35–0 with time left in second quarter. Green Bay got a field goal before halftime. However, long completions by McNabb to Owens and Westbrook led to three third-quarter field goals by David Akers. A 45-yard run by Dorsey Levens set up Akers' fourth field goal at the start of the final quarter, which made it 47–3. Packers' backup quarterback Craig Nall led Green Bay to two touchdown drives in the fourth quarter, long after the Eagles had called off the dogs. The win was an example of just how good the Eagles were. The Packers won their division that season, but were totally dismantled by Philadelphia. The Eagles offense clicked on all cylinders, with McNabb recording five touchdown passes and a team-record 464 passing yards. Owens and Westbrook both had over 150 receiving yards. Meanwhile, the Eagles defense registered five sacks and held the Packers' offense to three points while the starters remained in. They had also ended Packers QB Brett Favre's streak of 37 consecutive games with a touchdown pass. The win put the Eagles at 11–1 and proved conclusively that they were light years ahead of the rest of the conference.

==== Week 14: at Washington Redskins ====
| | 1 | 2 | 3 | 4 | Total |
|---|---|---|---|---|---|
| **Eagles** | 7 | 0 | 10 | 0 | **17** |
| Redskins | 7 | 0 | 0 | 7 | **14** |

A mere three weeks after pasting the Washington Redskins at home, the Eagles traveled to play them in a Sunday night game at FedExField. The Redskins were fired up all night, and Ladell Betts took the opening kickoff inside the Eagles 10-yard line. Two plays later Clinton Portis rushed it in for an early Washington lead. On a drive highlighted by receiver Todd Pinkston seemingly breaking off a route to shy away from a hit, the Eagles managed to score a game-tying touchdown with L.J. Smith making a 2-yard reception after a long pass interference penalty against Washington. At the end of the quarter, McNabb launched his longest pass of the season, an 80-yard bomb to Pinkston, which he caught before stumbling up to the four-yard line. Owens caught the next pass and tried to make a move to score his 15th touchdown of the year, but instead lost the football. Each side would miss a field goal before halftime arrived with the score knotted 7–7. The Eagles posted a 38-yard field goal by David Akers on the opening drive of the third quarter, then got a short Dorsey Levens touchdown at the end of the quarter, putting Philadelphia ahead 17–7. However, the Redskins defense intercepted McNabb near midfield, and Portis finished the drive with his second touchdown, making it a 17–14 game. With only a few minutes left, Washington quarterback Patrick Ramsey drove his team to the Eagles' 27-yard line. His next pass was to the end zone, and both Brian Dawkins and Lito Sheppard had a play on the ball, but Sheppard prudently allowed Dawkins to make the interception and end the Redskin threat. It was not the Eagles' prettiest game, but they survived a scare and escaped with another victory, improving their overall record to 12–1.

==== Week 15: vs. Dallas Cowboys ====
| | 1 | 2 | 3 | 4 | Total |
|---|---|---|---|---|---|
| Cowboys | 0 | 7 | 0 | 0 | **7** |
| **Eagles** | 0 | 6 | 0 | 6 | **12** |

weather= 39 °F (4 °C) (Light rain) After their scoring fest in Week 10, the Eagles and Dallas Cowboys played a defensive struggle in a Week 15 game that would mean home-field advantage throughout the playoffs if the Eagles were to win. The teams had long drives, but could not get into field goal range in the first quarter. In the second, the Eagles broke through with a drive capped by a 2-yard touchdown pass from Donovan McNabb to Chad Lewis. David Akers missed the extra point, making it a 6–0 game. McNabb was later sacked and fumbled the ball away to Dallas, with Vinny Testaverde taking advantage by firing a 7-yard touchdown pass to Keyshawn Johnson. The missed extra point now seemed more critical as the Eagles trailed 7–6 going into halftime. On the opening drive of the third quarter, McNabb found his favorite target, Terrell Owens for a 20-yard gain, but Dallas safety Roy Williams, made a horse-collar tackle on Owens, breaking his ankle. The play would prompt a new NFL rule the next season, barring horse-collar tackles. McNabb was intercepted two plays later and again later in the quarter as neither offense could score. Cowboys kicker Billy Cundiff missed a 46-yarder in the fourth quarter, giving the Eagles new life. McNabb, going back to one of his old tricks in the absence of Owens, made scrambles of 12 yards and 19 yards, setting up an eventual Dorsey Levens touchdown run from 2 yards out. The two-point conversion failed and it remained 12–7 Eagles. However, Lito Sheppard picked off Testaverde on the next series to end the game. Proving again that they could win a close game, the Eagles prevailed under adversity and in improving their record to 13–1, completed a sweep of their NFC East opponents while locking up home-field advantage throughout the playoffs. Unfortunately, the word after the game was that Owens, the Eagles' sharpest offensive weapon, would be out until at least the Super Bowl.

==== Week 16: at St. Louis Rams ====
| | 1 | 2 | 3 | 4 | Total |
|---|---|---|---|---|---|
| Eagles | 7 | 0 | 0 | 0 | **7** |
| **Rams** | 7 | 3 | 7 | 3 | **20** |

With nothing left to play for until the playoffs and in the wake of the disastrous injury to Terrell Owens, Eagles' head coach Andy Reid decided to only play his starters for one series in a Monday Night Football game against the St. Louis Rams. The Rams ran ten rushing plays, split between Steven Jackson and Marshall Faulk, in the opening drive as they scored a touchdown. The Eagles offense, also playing without Brian Westbrook who was a healthy scratch, efficiently marched down the field, with Freddie Mitchell, who was now a starter, receiving a 7-yard touchdown pass from McNabb. At that point, most of the Eagles' starters left the game. The second-string Philadelphia defense limited a St. Louis team that needed the game to help secure a playoff spot. The Rams offense only scored 20 points, but backup quarterbacks Koy Detmer and Jeff Blake could do little to score on St. Louis.

==== Week 17: vs. Cincinnati Bengals ====
| | 1 | 2 | 3 | 4 | Total |
|---|---|---|---|---|---|
| **Bengals** | 0 | 17 | 14 | 7 | **38** |
| Eagles | 0 | 3 | 0 | 7 | **10** |

weather= 45 °F (7 °C) (Cloudy) The 7–8 Cincinnati Bengals rolled over the Philadelphia reserve players. Donovan McNabb and Brian Westbrook were among the many starters that did not play for the Eagles, who were clearly preparing for a run to the Super Bowl. Koy Detmer and Jeff Blake were again mostly unimpressive while Bengals running back Rudi Johnson torched the Eagles' backup defense for three touchdowns to give Cincinnati a 38–3 lead by the middle of the fourth quarter. Blake was able to connect with Freddie Mitchell, who had six catches for 76 yards, for a touchdown late. Meanwhile, Terrell Owens continued to rehab his ankle, guaranteeing that if the Eagles made it to the Super Bowl, he would be ready to play in it. The Eagles, not trying to win their last two games, finished with a franchise best 13–3 record.

=== Standings ===
==== Division ====
NFC East
| | W | L | T | PCT | DIV | CONF | PF | PA | STK |
|---|---|---|---|---|---|---|---|---|---|
| ^{(1)} Philadelphia Eagles | 13 | 3 | 0 | .813 | 6–0 | 11–1 | 386 | 260 | L2 |
| New York Giants | 6 | 10 | 0 | .375 | 3–3 | 5–7 | 303 | 347 | W1 |
| Dallas Cowboys | 6 | 10 | 0 | .375 | 2–4 | 5–7 | 293 | 405 | L1 |
| Washington Redskins | 6 | 10 | 0 | .375 | 1–5 | 6–6 | 240 | 265 | W1 |

==== Conference ====
NFC
| # | Team | Division | W | L | T | PCT | DIV | CONF | SOS | SOV | STK |
|---|---|---|---|---|---|---|---|---|---|---|---|
**Division leaders**
| 1 | Philadelphia Eagles | East | 13 | 3 | 0 | .813 | 6–0 | 11–1 | .453 | .409 | L2 |
| 2 | Atlanta Falcons | South | 11 | 5 | 0 | .688 | 4–2 | 8–4 | .420 | .432 | L2 |
| 3 | Green Bay Packers | North | 10 | 6 | 0 | .625 | 5–1 | 9–3 | .457 | .419 | W2 |
| 4 | Seattle Seahawks | West | 9 | 7 | 0 | .563 | 3–3 | 8–4 | .445 | .368 | W2 |
**Wild cards**
| 5 (Note: St. Louis clinched the NFC #5 seed instead of Minnesota or New Orleans based on better conference record (7–5 to Minnesota’s 5–7 to New Orleans’ 6–6).) | St. Louis Rams | West | 8 | 8 | 0 | .500 | 5–1 | 7–5 | .488 | .438 | W2 |
| 6 (Note: Minnesota clinched the NFC #6 seed instead of New Orleans based on head-to-head victory.) | Minnesota Vikings | North | 8 | 8 | 0 | .500 | 3–3 | 5–7 | .480 | .406 | L2 |
**Did not qualify for the postseason**
| 7 | New Orleans Saints | South | 8 | 8 | 0 | .500 | 3–3 | 6–6 | .465 | .427 | W4 |
| 8 | Carolina Panthers | South | 7 | 9 | 0 | .438 | 3–3 | 6–6 | .496 | .366 | L1 |
| 9 (Note: Detroit finished ahead of Arizona and New York Giants based upon head-to-head record (2–0 versus Arizona’s 1–1 and New York Giants’ 0–2). Division tiebreak was initially used to eliminate Dallas and Washington.) | Detroit Lions | North | 6 | 10 | 0 | .375 | 2–4 | 5–7 | .496 | .417 | L2 |
| 10 | Arizona Cardinals | West | 6 | 10 | 0 | .375 | 2–4 | 5–7 | .461 | .417 | W1 |
| 11 (Note: New York Giants finished ahead of Dallas and Washington in the NFC East based on better head-to-head record (3–1 to Dallas‘ 2–2 to Washington’s 1–3).) | New York Giants | East | 6 | 10 | 0 | .375 | 3–3 | 5–7 | .516 | .417 | W1 |
| 12 (Note: Dallas finished ahead of Washington in the NFC East based on head-to-head sweep.) | Dallas Cowboys | East | 6 | 10 | 0 | .375 | 2–4 | 5–7 | .516 | .375 | L1 |
| 13 | Washington Redskins | East | 6 | 10 | 0 | .375 | 1–5 | 6–6 | .477 | .333 | W1 |
| 14 (Note: Tampa Bay finished ahead of Chicago based upon head-to-head victory.) | Tampa Bay Buccaneers | South | 5 | 11 | 0 | .313 | 2–4 | 4–8 | .477 | .413 | L4 |
| 15 | Chicago Bears | North | 5 | 11 | 0 | .313 | 2–4 | 4–8 | .465 | .388 | L4 |
| 16 | San Francisco 49ers | West | 2 | 14 | 0 | .125 | 2–4 | 2–10 | .488 | .375 | L3 |
**Tiebreakers** (Note: When breaking ties for three or more teams under the NFL's rules, they are first broken within divisions, then comparing only the highest-ranked remaining team from each division.)

== Postseason ==
=== Schedule ===
| Round | Date | Opponent (seed) | Result | Record | Venue | Recap |
|---|---|---|---|---|---|---|
| Wild Card | First-round bye | | | | | |
| Divisional | January 16, 2005 | Minnesota Vikings (6) | W 27–14 | 1–0 | Lincoln Financial Field | Recap |
| NFC Championship | January 23, 2005 | Atlanta Falcons (2) | W 27–10 | 2–0 | Lincoln Financial Field | Recap |
| Super Bowl XXXIX | February 6, 2005 | vs. New England Patriots (A2) | L 21–24 | 2–1 | Alltel Stadium | Recap |

=== Game summaries ===
==== NFC Divisional Playoffs: vs. (6) Minnesota Vikings ====
NFC Divisional Playoffs: (6) Minnesota Vikings at (1) Philadelphia Eagles – Game summary

| Quarter | 1 | 2 | 3 | 4 | Total |
|---|---|---|---|---|---|
| Vikings | 0 | 7 | 0 | 7 | 14 |
| Eagles | 7 | 14 | 0 | 6 | 27 |

at Lincoln Financial Field, Philadelphia, Pennsylvania

- Date: January 16
- Game time: 1:00 p.m. EST
- Game weather: 31 °F (−1 °C), cloudy
- Game attendance: 67,722
- Referee: Pete Morelli
- TV announcers (Fox): Joe Buck (play-by-play), Troy Aikman, Cris Collinsworth (color commentators), Pam Oliver, and Chris Myers (sideline reporters)

Game information

First quarter

- PHI – Freddie Mitchell 2-yard pass from Donovan McNabb (David Akers kick), 6:18. Eagles 7–0. Drive: 7 plays, 53 yards, 4:34.

Second quarter

- PHI – Westbrook 7-yard pass from Donovan McNabb (David Akers kick), 14:16. Eagles 14–0. Drive: 7 plays, 92 yards, 3:57.
- MIN – Daunte Culpepper 7-yard run (Morten Andersen kick), 10:37. Eagles 14–7. Drive: 6 plays, 58 yards, 3:39.
- PHI – Freddie Mitchell fumble recovery in end zone (David Akers kick), 10:08. Eagles 21–7. Drive: 2 plays, 46 yards, 0:29.

Third quarter

- No scoring plays.

Fourth quarter

- PHI – David Akers 21-yard field goal, 13:20. Eagles 24–7. Drive: 6 plays, 66 yards, 2:24.
- PHI – David Akers 23-yard field goal, 6:39. Eagles 27–7. Drive: 10 plays, 55 yards, 5:36.
- MIN – Marcus Robinson 32-yard pass from Daunte Culpepper (Morten Andersen kick), 1:59. Eagles 27–14. Drive: 12 plays, 80 yards, 4:40.

Top passers

- MIN – Daunte Culpepper – 24/46, 316 yards, TD, 2 INT
- PHI – Donovan McNabb – 21/33, 286 yards, 2 TD

Top rushers

- MIN – Michael Bennett – 8 rushes, 37 yards
- PHI – Brian Westbrook – 12 rushes, 70 yards

Top receivers

- MIN – Marcus Robinson – 5 receptions, 119 yards, TD
- PHI – Freddie Mitchell – 5 receptions, 65 yards, TD

With expectations high, the Eagles' playoff run began with the Minnesota Vikings coming to town. Minnesota had backed into the playoffs with an 8–8 record and losses in four of their final five regular season games, but they had upset the Green Bay Packers in the Wild Card round.

On the Eagles' second possession, Brian Westbrook, who had missed the 2003–2004 playoffs with an injury, gained 48 total yards, setting up Donovan McNabb's two-yard touchdown pass to Freddie Mitchell. At the end of the quarter, McNabb found third receiver Greg Lewis for a 52-yard completion. Two plays later, Westbrook caught a short pass over the middle and put Philadelphia up 14–0. A long completion to Marcus Robinson by Daunte Culpepper led to a quarterback bootleg for a touchdown, keeping Minnesota in the game. J.R. Reed returned the kickoff into Viking territory, and a few plays later, McNabb hit L.J. Smith with a pass over the middle and inside the Minnesota ten-yard line. Smith pushed for the score, but was hit hard, popping the ball into air towards the goal line. Freddie Mitchell was in the neighborhood and caught the derelict fumble in the end zone for an amazing touchdown that proved it would be the Eagles' day.

The Vikings got the ball to the Eagles' 4-yard line, but a botched fake field goal attempt left them with nothing to show for the drive and put a dent in their hopes. Interceptions by Ike Reese and Jeremiah Trotter in the third quarter kept Minnesota at bay, while Freddie Mitchell's luck was reversed when he fumbled a near-touchdown out of the end zone, resulting in a touchback. Two David Akers field goals in the fourth quarter put the game at 27–7 and out of reach. Culpepper added a 32-yard touchdown pass to Robinson, but the Eagles were going to their fourth straight NFC Championship Game. McNabb had 286 passing yards and two touchdowns, Westbrook had over 100 all-purpose yards, and Mitchell caught five balls and had two touchdowns filling in for Terrell Owens.

==== NFC Championship: vs. (2) Atlanta Falcons ====
NFC Championship: (2) Atlanta Falcons at (1) Philadelphia Eagles – Game summary

| Quarter | 1 | 2 | 3 | 4 | Total |
|---|---|---|---|---|---|
| Falcons | 0 | 10 | 0 | 0 | 10 |
| Eagles | 7 | 7 | 6 | 7 | 27 |

at Lincoln Financial Field, Philadelphia, Pennsylvania

- Date: January 23
- Game time: 3:00 p.m. EST
- Game weather: 17 °F (−8 °C), partly sunny
- Game attendance: 67,717
- Referee: Bill Carollo
- TV announcers (Fox): Joe Buck (play-by-play), Troy Aikman, Cris Collinsworth (color commentators), Pam Oliver, and Chris Myers (sideline reporters)

Game information

First quarter

- PHI – Dorsey Levens 4-yard run (David Akers kick), 4:16. Eagles 7–0. Drive: 6 plays, 70 yards, 3:09.

Second quarter

- ATL – Jay Feely 23-yard field goal, 10:19. Eagles 7–3. Drive: 17 plays, 64 yards, 8:57.
- PHI – Chad Lewis 3-yard pass from Donovan McNabb (David Akers kick), 4:58. Eagles 14–3. Drive: 9 plays, 72 yards, 5:21.
- ATL – Warrick Dunn 10-yard run (Jay Feely kick), 2:02. Eagles 14–10. Drive: 5 plays, 70 yards, 2:56.

Third quarter

- PHI – David Akers 31-yard field goal, 8:55. Eagles 17–10. Drive: 11 plays, 60 yards, 6:05.
- PHI – David Akers 34-yard field goal, 2:00. Eagles 20–10. Drive: 4 plays, –5 yards, 0:56.

Fourth quarter

- PHI – Chad Lewis 2-yard pass from Donovan McNabb (David Akers kick), 3:21. Eagles 27–10. Drive: 11 plays, 65 yards, 6:53.

Top passers

- ATL – Michael Vick – 11/24, 136 yards, INT
- PHI – Donovan McNabb – 17/26, 180 yards, 2 TD

Top rushers

- ATL – Warrick Dunn – 15 rushes, 59 yards, TD
- PHI – Brian Westbrook – 16 rushes, 96 yards

Top receivers

- ATL – Alge Crumpler – 4 receptions, 49 yards
- PHI – Greg Lewis – 2 receptions, 65 yards

The Eagles hoped that the fourth time would be a charm for them against the Atlanta Falcons in the NFC Championship Game after losing the past three title games. The game would be played in post-blizzard, 17 °F (−8 °C)-degree weather, with swirling frigid winds nearing 30 mph (48 km/h). Atlanta had gone 11–5 over the year, and were the second best team in the conference, behind Philadelphia. Atlanta's quarterback and star player Michael Vick would basically be the Falcons' main hope of upsetting the Eagles. He tried to run twice on the opening drive, but the Eagles' defense, using a mush rush, stopped him both times. Later in the quarter, Brian Westbrook broke a 36-yard run to the right side, followed by a completion to L.J. Smith for 21 yards. Dorsey Levens, with some help from his teammates, pushed his way in for a 4-yard touchdown, giving Philadelphia a 7–0 lead. Atlanta took the ball back and began a long drive, which featured many Warrick Dunn and T. J. Duckett rushes, that took them to first and goal from the Eagles' two-yard line. Duckett was stuffed on first down, Vick threw incomplete on second, then looked to have room to run on third, but big Hollis Thomas emerged and leveled Vick at the 3-yard line. The Falcons settled for a field goal, making it 7–3.

The Eagles moved towards the end zone again, the big blow coming when Greg Lewis came back and hauled in a 45-yard pass from Donovan McNabb, setting up first and goal from the Falcons' four-yard line. Two plays later, McNabb passed in the corner of the end zone to veteran tight end Chad Lewis, with Lewis catching the pass while making a spectacular effort to stay in bounds. On Atlanta's next possession, in the middle of the second quarter, Vick went deep over the middle for tight end Alge Crumpler, who made the catch but was absolutely crushed by safety Brian Dawkins on the play. Dunn went in for the 10-yard score on the next play and it was 14–10 Eagles. Philadelphia took the kickoff in the third quarter and marched down the field, setting up a 31-yard field goal by David Akers in the wind. Defensive end Derrick Burgess had his first of two sacks on Vick to kill Atlanta's next drive. Later in the quarter, a low pass by Vick was intercepted by Dawkins, leading to another Akers field goal and increasing the Eagles' advantage to 20–10.

As the game moved into the fourth quarter and Atlanta's passing offense could do little against the Philadelphia secondary, a Super Bowl berth looked more and more likely. A six-and-a-half minute drive that ended in another short Chad Lewis touchdown reception kicked off the celebration in Philadelphia. Victorious by a score of 27–10, the Eagles were NFC Champions for the first time since 1980. McNabb threw for a modest 180 yards in the windy weather, but had two touchdowns and no interceptions. Westbrook came up with 96 yards on the ground, while Chad Lewis made two critical touchdown receptions. It was later learned that Lewis broke his ankle on the second touchdown catch, and he would be left off the Super Bowl roster. Meanwhile, the defense held Vick to 136 passing yards and 26 rushing yards, and kept Atlanta off the scoreboard in the second half.

==== Super Bowl XXXIX: vs. New England Patriots ====
Super Bowl XXXIX: (A2) New England Patriots vs. (N1) Philadelphia Eagles – Game summary

| Quarter | 1 | 2 | 3 | 4 | Total |
|---|---|---|---|---|---|
| Patriots | 0 | 7 | 7 | 10 | 24 |
| Eagles | 0 | 7 | 7 | 7 | 21 |

at Alltel Stadium, Jacksonville, Florida

- Date: February 6
- Game time: 6:30 p.m. EST
- Game weather: 59 °F (15 °C), cloudy
- Game attendance: 78,125
- Referee: Terry McAulay
- TV announcers (Fox): Joe Buck (play-by-play), Troy Aikman, Cris Collinsworth (color commentators), Pam Oliver, and Chris Myers (sideline reporters)

Game information

First quarter

- No scoring plays.

Second quarter

- PHI – L.J. Smith 6-yard pass from Donovan McNabb (David Akers kick), 9:55. Eagles 7–0. Drive: 9 plays, 81 yards, 4:36.
- NE – David Givens 4-yard pass from Tom Brady (Adam Vinatieri kick), 1:10. Tied 7–7. Drive: 7 plays, 37 yards, 3:15.

Third quarter

- NE – Mike Vrabel 2-yard pass from Tom Brady (Adam Vinatieri kick), 11:04. Patriots 14–7. Drive: 9 plays, 69 yards, 3:56.
- PHI – Brian Westbrook 10-yard pass from Donovan McNabb (David Akers kick), 3:35. Tied 14–14. Drive: 10 plays, 74 yards, 4:17.

Fourth quarter

- NE – Corey Dillon 2-yard run (Adam Vinatieri kick), 13:44. Patriots 21–14. Drive: 9 plays, 66 yards, 4:51.
- NE – Adam Vinatieri 22-yard field goal, 8:40. Patriots 24–14. Drive: 8 plays, 43 yards, 3:49.
- PHI – Greg Lewis 30-yard pass from Donovan McNabb (David Akers kick), 1:48. Patriots 24–21. Drive: 13 plays, 79 yards, 3:52.

Top passers

- NE – Tom Brady – 23/33, 236 yards, 2 TD
- PHI – Donovan McNabb – 30/51, 357 yards, 3 TD, 3 INT

Top rushers

- NE – Corey Dillon – 18 rushes, 75 yards, TD
- PHI – Brian Westbrook – 15 rushes, 44 yards

Top receivers

- NE – Deion Branch – 11 receptions, 133 yards
- PHI – Terrell Owens – 9 receptions, 122 yards

In their first Super Bowl appearance since Super Bowl XV, the Eagles met the New England Patriots on February 6, 2005, at ALLTEL Stadium in Jacksonville, Florida. The Patriots, led by Tom Brady had won two of the past three Super Bowls and a win against the Eagles would likely lead to "dynasty status". They had cruised to a 14–2 regular season record, and taken down the Indianapolis Colts and 15–1 Pittsburgh Steelers in the AFC playoffs. Meanwhile, the Eagles, considered heavy underdogs, had star wide receiver Terrell Owens miraculously returning, against doctor's orders, from injury.

A third-down sack and subsequent fumble by Donovan McNabb on the Eagles' first possession nearly led to a turnover in Eagles' territory, but Andy Reid challenged the play and the Eagles were able to punt. Both offenses struggled in general until McNabb hit Owens on a 30-yard catch and run to inside the New England 10-yard line. Unfortunately, Patriot safety Rodney Harrison picked off McNabb's pass to the end zone. After a New England punt, the Eagles had good field position, but L. J. Smith was hit and fumbled after a completion, giving the ball back to the Patriots. New England's offense continued to struggle and the Eagles took back over, with McNabb finding maligned wide receiver Todd Pinkston for a 17-yard completion then a spectacular leaping 40-yard catch. On third and goal, McNabb hit Smith in the end zone and the Eagles had drawn first blood 7–0. Brady led the Patriots to the Eagles' 4-yard line, but he was sacked and fumbled, with Darwin Walker recovering for the Eagles. Things were looking good for Philadelphia, but they went three and out, giving New England the ball back at the Eagles' 37-yard line. Brady did not waste this opportunity, and led the Patriots to a touchdown with 1:21 left in the half, with David Givens catching a 4-yard scoring strike and celebrating by mocking Owens' wing flap celebration.

Brady connected with eventual game MVP Deion Branch four times on the opening drive of the third quarter. Mike Vrabel caught the short touchdown pass and New England had its first lead 14–7. In the middle of the third, the Eagles drove to the New England 10-yard line, before McNabb fired a bullet to Brian Westbrook between two Patriot defenders for a game-tying score. The Patriots answered back with a scoring drive capped by a two-yard touchdown rush by Corey Dillon early in the fourth quarter, giving New England the lead back 21–14. On their next possession, the Patriots got good field position and ended the drive with a short Adam Vinatieri field goal, pushing the lead to 24–14.

Tedy Bruschi intercepted McNabb on the next series and it looked like the Eagles might be finished. However, they forced a three-and-out and got the ball back with 5:40 to play. They drove down the field, but there was an alarming lack of urgency and the clock kept ticking. A sudden 30-yard touchdown pass from McNabb to Greg Lewis gave the Eagles new life, but less than two minutes remained. The Eagles failed to get the onside kick, then burned their timeouts on New England's possession. Philadelphia got the ball back at their 4-yard line with :46 seconds left down 24–21, but Rodney Harrison got his second interception of McNabb three plays later and the season was over. McNabb threw for 357 yards and three touchdowns, but his three interceptions were devastating. Owens had nine catches and 122 yards on his partially healed ankle, while Pinkston hauled in 82 receiving yards. The Eagles had done better than most expected and were in the game until the end, but they had made too many first half mistakes, when the Patriots were playing poorly, and left too many opportunities to score points on the field. Nevertheless, the 2004 Eagles had done better than any Eagles team had done since the 1960 NFL Championship. The Eagles would eventually win Super Bowl LII against New England in 2017.
