= Chad Lewis =

American football player (born 1971)

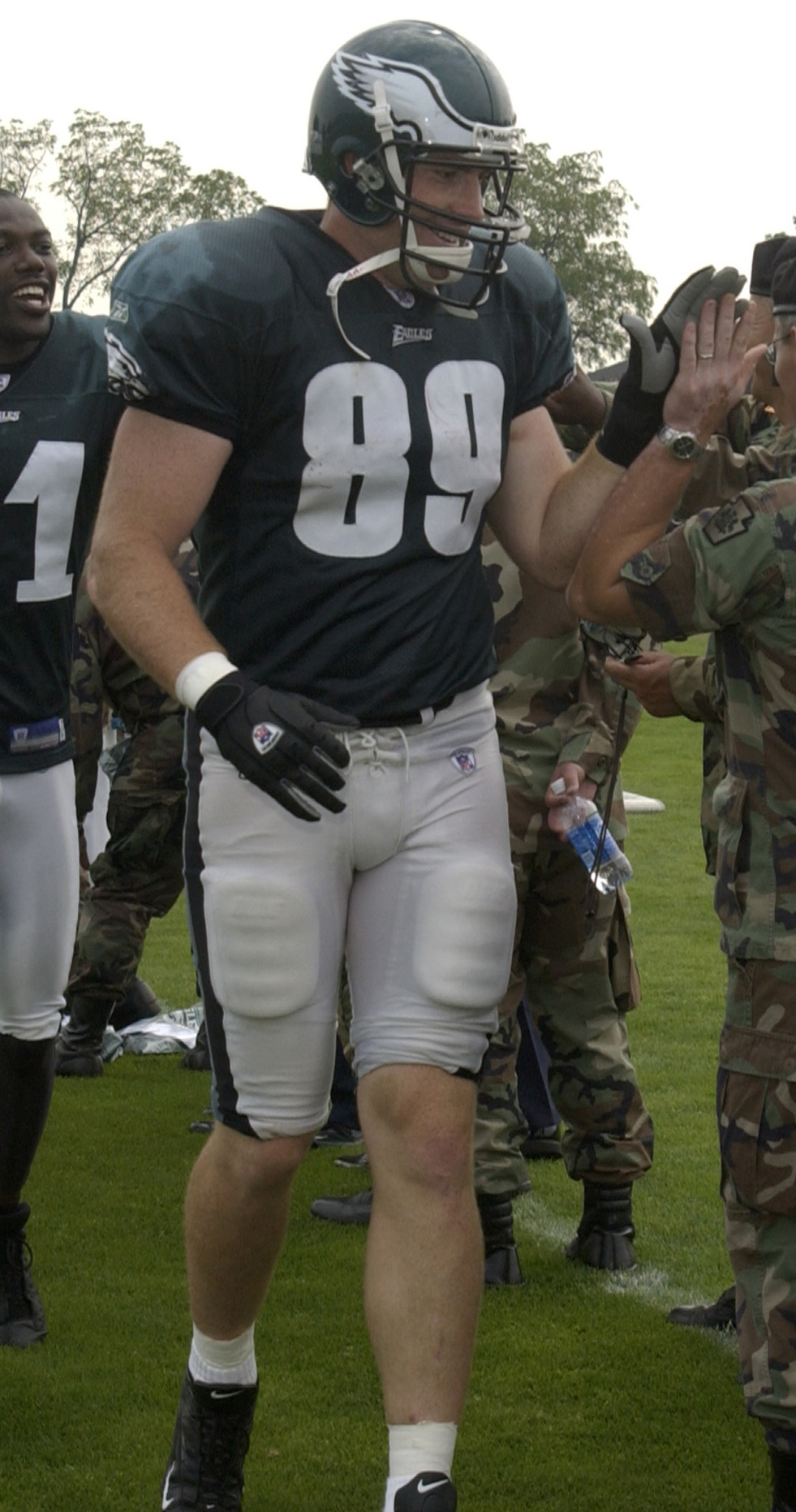
- Lewis in 2004.

No. 89
- Position: Tight end

Personal information
- Born: October 5, 1971 (age 55); Fort Dix, New Jersey, U.S.
- Listed height: 6 ft 6 in (1.98 m)
- Listed weight: 252 lb (114 kg)

Career information
- High school: Orem (Orem, Utah)
- College: BYU
- NFL draft: 1997: undrafted

Career history
- Philadelphia Eagles (1997–1998); St. Louis Rams (1998–1999); Philadelphia Eagles (1999–2005)

Awards and highlights
- Second-team All-Pro (2000); 3× Pro Bowl (2000, 2001, 2002)

Career NFL statistics
- Receptions: 229
- Receiving yards: 2,361
- Receiving touchdowns: 23
- Stats at Pro Football Reference

Chad Wayne Lewis (born October 5, 1971) is an American former professional football player who was a tight end in the National Football League (NFL) for the Philadelphia Eagles and St. Louis Rams.

== Early life ==
Lewis grew up in Orem, Utah and played football and ran track at Orem High School. Lewis, who is a member of the Church of Jesus Christ of Latter-day Saints, served a two-year church mission in Taichung, Taiwan before attending college. While in Taiwan, he learned to speak Mandarin.

== College career ==
After walking on at Brigham Young University (BYU), Lewis finished his collegiate career with 111 receptions for 1,376 yards, and ten touchdowns. As a junior, he was an All-WAC first-team choice, and a UPI All-American honorable mention.

== Professional career ==
Lewis signed as an undrafted free agent with the Philadelphia Eagles in 1997. On October 26, he caught his first career touchdown from Rodney Peete in a 13-12 win over the Cowboys. He played all 16 games as a rookie primarily on special teams, also catching 12 passes for 94 yards and 4 touchdowns on the season.

Lewis sustained an ankle injury in preseason and was released by the Eagles on September 15, 1998. Once cleared to play, he signed with the St. Louis Rams three months later. However, due to spending most of the 1998 season unsigned, he did not play any games that year.

Through the first ten weeks of the 1999 season, Lewis saw limited playing time on the Rams team that would become known as The Greatest Show on Turf. This led to his release on November 16, but he was re-signed by the Eagles the following day. In week 17, Lewis caught a touchdown in the Eagles 38-31 win over his former team, the Rams, snapping a seven-game win streak for St. Louis. (Also the last game the Rams would lose that year en route to Super Bowl XXXIV).

Lewis established himself as the Eagles starting tight end and a favorite target of quarterback Donovan McNabb, being name an All Pro in 2000, as well as the first of three consecutive Pro Bowl selections. In 5 1/2 seasons after returning to the Eagles, Lewis only missed two games.

In 2000 he led the Eagles with 69 receptions for 735 yards and three touchdowns, helping Philadelphia return to the playoffs for the first time since 1996. In 2001, he caught a career high six touchdowns. That year, the Eagles would make the first of four straight NFC Championship Game appearances. Losing the first three, Philadelphia defeated Atlanta in the 2004 NFC Championship Game where Lewis caught two touchdown passes. On the second touchdown reception, he suffered a Lisfranc injury to his left foot that kept him out of the Super Bowl XXXIX loss to the New England Patriots.

Lewis spent the first half of the 2005 season rehabbing his injury; his contract expired following the Super Bowl so he remained a free agent. Once healed, Lewis re-signed with the Eagles on a one-year deal. Lewis and L. J. Smith were used in two-tight end sets which were not traditional for NFL offenses at the time.

Lewis retired following the 2005 season. He has visited China, Taiwan, Singapore and Thailand to promote the NFL, give interviews and help with football clinics. He has also spoken at the Fourth of July celebration in China.

In 2009, Lewis released a memoir, Surround Yourself With Greatness, and in 2010, he returned to BYU as an Associate Athletic Director.

Lewis is a regular speaker at BYU and the Church of Jesus Christ of Latter-day Saints's Missionary Training Center.

=== NFL statistics ===
Regular season
Year	Team	GP	Receiving						Fumbles	
Year	Team	GP	Rec	Yds	Avg	Lng	TD	FD	Fum	Lost
1997	PHI	16	12	94	7.8	17	4	6	0	0
1999	STL	6	1	12	12.0	12	0	1	0	0
1999	PHI	6	7	76	10.9	21	3	6	0	0
2000	PHI	16	69	735	10.7	52	3	35	0	0
2001	PHI	15	41	422	10.3	33	6	20	1	1
2002	PHI	16	42	398	9.5	30	3	22	2	2
2003	PHI	16	23	293	12.7	29	1	17	0	0
2004	PHI	15	29	267	9.2	21	3	16	0	0
2005	PHI	8	5	64	12.8	17	0	4	0	0
Career		114	229	2,361	10.3	52	23	127	3	3

Postseason
Year	Team	GP	Receiving						Fumbles	
Year	Team	GP	Rec	Yds	Avg	Lng	TD	FD	Fum	Lost
2000	PHI	2	6	51	8.5	17	0	0	0	0
2001	PHI	3	12	145	12.1	33	1	9	0	0
2002	PHI	2	8	87	10.9	16	0	7	0	0
2003	PHI	2	8	106	13.3	27	0	4	0	0
2004	PHI	2	4	20	5.0	12	2	3	0	0
Career		11	38	409	10.8	33	3	23	0	0
