= Hollis Thomas =

American football player and coach (born 1974)

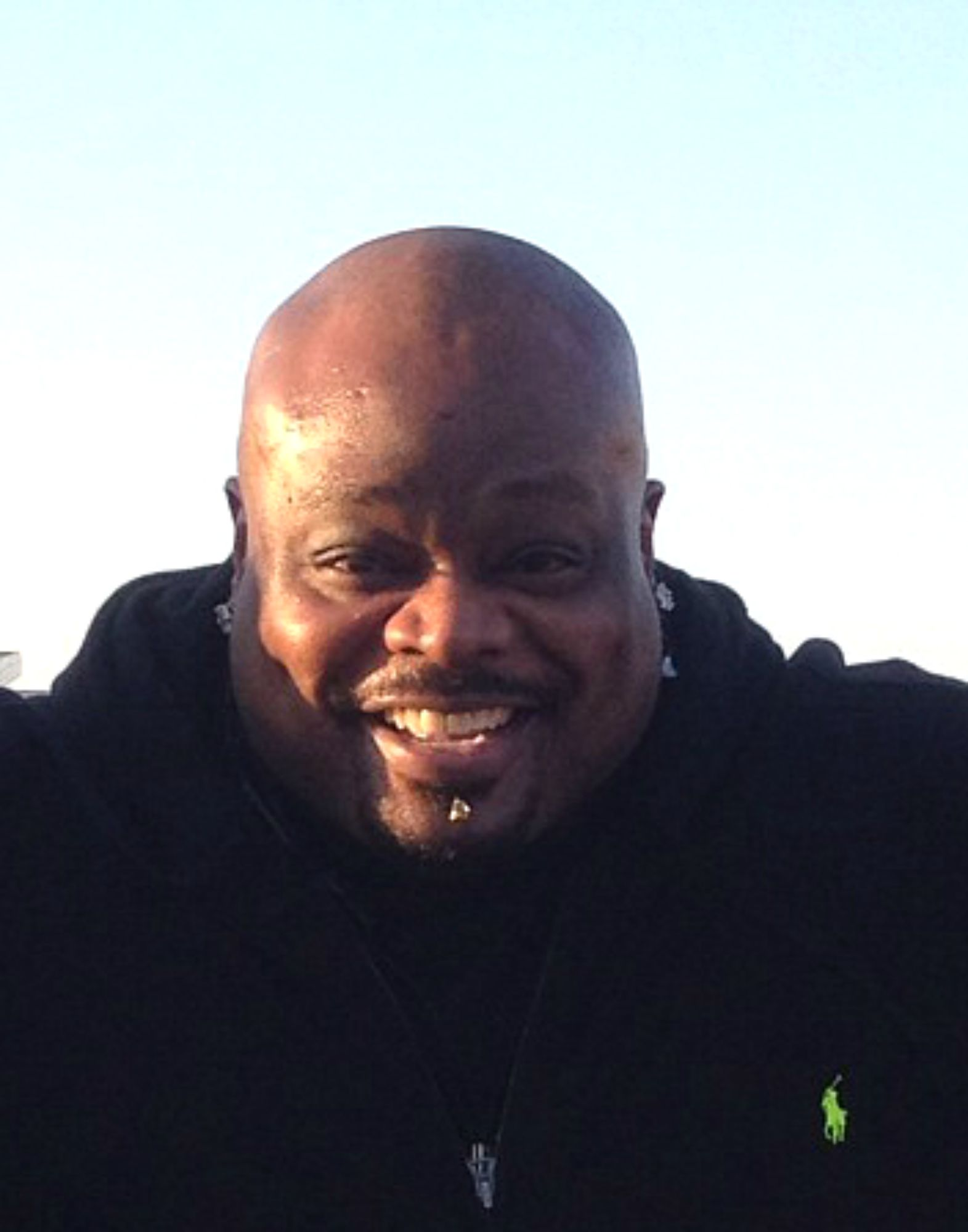
- Thomas in 2013

No. 78, 99, 93, 75
- Position: Defensive tackle

Personal information
- Born: January 10, 1974 (age 52); Abilene, Texas, U.S.
- Listed height: 6 ft 0 in (1.83 m)
- Listed weight: 335 lb (152 kg)

Career information
- High school: Sumner (St. Louis, Missouri)
- College: Northern Illinois
- NFL draft: 1996: undrafted

Career history

Playing
- Philadelphia Eagles (1996–2005); New Orleans Saints (2006–2008); St. Louis Rams (2009); Carolina Panthers (2009); Omaha Nighthawks (2010)*
- * Offseason or practice squad member only

Coaching
- Philadelphia Soul (2013) Defensive line coach

Awards and highlights
- Football News All-Rookie Team (1996); First-team All-Big West (1995)

Career NFL statistics
- Total tackles: 518
- Sacks: 20
- Forced fumbles: 7
- Fumble recoveries: 8
- Stats at Pro Football Reference

Hollis Thomas Jr. (born January 10, 1974) is an American former professional football player who was a defensive tackle in the National Football League (NFL). He played college football for the Northern Illinois Huskies and was signed by the Philadelphia Eagles as an undrafted free agent in 1996.

Thomas also played for the New Orleans Saints and Carolina Panthers. Over 14 NFL seasons, Thomas appeared in 174 regular-season games (126 starts), recording 505 total tackles, 20.5 sacks, four forced fumbles, and a safety. Known for his strength, personality, and leadership in the locker room, Thomas was a fan favorite in Philadelphia and New Orleans alike.

After his playing career, Thomas transitioned to sports media, co-hosting local radio shows on SportsRadio 94 WIP in Philadelphia and launching his own podcast, *The Green Legion Radio Show*, where he regularly discusses Eagles football and NFL topics.

== Professional career ==
=== Philadelphia Eagles (1996–2005) ===
After going undrafted in the 1996 NFL draft, Thomas signed with the Philadelphia Eagles as a free agent on April 27, 1996. Despite long odds of making the roster, Thomas impressed coaches during training camp and earned a spot in the defensive line rotation as a rookie. He appeared in 12 games during the 1996 season, recording 24 tackles and a sack.

By his third season, Thomas had become a fixture on the interior of the Eagles’ defensive line under defensive coordinator Jim Johnson. Known for his size (listed at 6 ft 0 in, 335 lb) and surprising quickness, Thomas earned a reputation as a strong run-stopper and locker-room leader. Between 1998 and 2001, he started 55 games and anchored a defense that helped the Eagles reach four consecutive NFC Championship Game appearances (2001–2004).

In 2000, Thomas recorded 47 total tackles and two sacks, helping the Eagles finish second in the NFC East. During the 2001 season, he appeared in all 16 games and posted a career-high 58 tackles along with three sacks. He remained a key part of the defensive line rotation throughout the early 2000s alongside Corey Simon, Darwin Walker, and Jerome McDougle.

Thomas missed part of the 2004 season with a torn triceps but returned for the Eagles’ playoff run to Super Bowl XXXIX, where they were defeated 24–21 by the New England Patriots.

In March 2006, the Eagles released Thomas after ten seasons with the team. At the time of his release, he had played 127 regular-season games for Philadelphia, recording 390 tackles and 20 sacks.

=== New Orleans Saints (2006–2008) ===
Shortly after his release, Thomas was claimed off waivers by the New Orleans Saints and quickly became a starter at defensive tackle under head coach Sean Payton. He was credited with stabilizing the Saints’ run defense and played an important role in the team’s turnaround from a 3–13 record in 2005 to a 10–6 record and an appearance in the 2006 NFC Championship Game. He finished the 2006 regular season with 57 tackles and 3.5 sacks, ranking among team leaders in tackles for loss.

On December 5, 2006, the NFL suspended Thomas for four games after testing positive for anabolic steroids. Thomas and the Saints medical staff attributed the positive test to an asthma medication containing a banned steroid component. Despite appeals from the team and public support from the NFL Players Association, the suspension was upheld.

Thomas returned to start 14 games in 2007, again ranking among the team’s top interior defenders. During a preseason practice in 2008, he suffered a torn right triceps and was released with an injury settlement on September 11 before being re-signed later that year once he recovered. He was released again following the 2008 season.

=== St. Louis Rams (2009) ===
On July 29, 2009, Thomas signed a one-year deal with the St. Louis Rams. He appeared in two games for St. Louis before being released.

=== Carolina Panthers (2009) ===
On October 1, 2009, Thomas signed with the Carolina Panthers following the release of rookie defensive tackle Ra'Shon Harris. He played in eight games for Carolina, starting four, and recorded 17 total tackles and a safety. In Week 7 against the Buffalo Bills, Thomas tackled running back Fred Jackson in the end zone for a safety during a 20–9 loss.

== NFL career statistics ==
Legend
	Led the league
**Bold**	Career high

=== Regular season ===
Year	Team	Games		Tackles				Interceptions				Fumbles			
Year	Team	GP	GS	Comb	Solo	Ast	Sck	Int	Yds	TD	Lng	FF	FR	Yds	TD
1996	PHI	16	5	42	32	10	1.0	0	0	0	0	0	0	0	0
1997	PHI	16	16	**61**	39	**22**	2.5	0	0	0	0	2	**1**	0	0
1998	PHI	12	12	42	34	8	**5.0**	0	0	0	0	0	**1**	0	0
1999	PHI	16	16	49	38	11	1.0	0	0	0	0	1	**1**	**2**	0
2000	PHI	16	16	60	**46**	14	4.0	0	0	0	0	**3**	**1**	0	0
2001	PHI	14	14	52	43	9	0.0	0	0	0	0	1	**1**	0	0
2003	PHI	7	2	22	16	6	0.0	0	0	0	0	0	0	0	0
2004	PHI	13	2	21	17	4	0.0	0	0	0	0	0	**1**	0	0
2005	PHI	16	12	35	27	8	0.0	0	0	0	0	0	0	0	0
2006	NOR	12	12	43	35	8	3.5	0	0	0	0	0	**1**	0	0
2007	NOR	16	14	50	38	12	3.0	0	0	0	0	0	0	0	0
2008	NOR	8	2	6	5	1	0.0	0	0	0	0	0	0	0	0
2009	STL	3	0	2	2	0	0.0	0	0	0	0	0	0	0	0
2009	CAR	13	13	33	24	9	0.0	0	0	0	0	0	**1**	0	0
		178	136	518	396	122	20.0	0	0	0	0	7	8	2	0

=== Playoffs ===
Year	Team	Games		Tackles				Interceptions				Fumbles			
Year	Team	GP	GS	Comb	Solo	Ast	Sck	Int	Yds	TD	Lng	FF	FR	Yds	TD
1996	PHI	1	0	5	5	0	0.0	0	0	0	0	0	0	0	0
2000	PHI	2	2	**7**	**7**	0	**1.0**	0	0	0	0	0	**1**	0	0
2004	PHI	3	0	5	3	2	**1.0**	0	0	0	0	0	0	0	0
2006	NOR	2	2	6	2	**4**	0.0	0	0	0	0	0	0	0	0
		8	4	23	17	6	2.0	0	0	0	0	0	1	0	0
