= Greg Lewis (wide receiver) =

American football player and coach (born 1980)

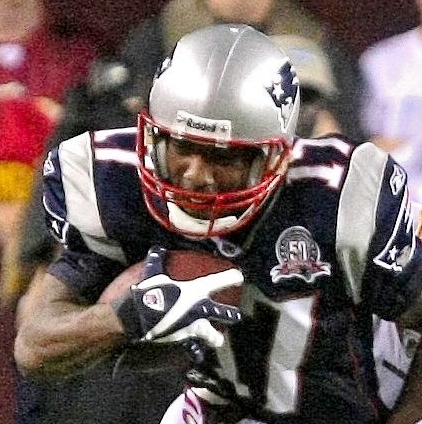
- Lewis with the New England Patriots in 2009

Tennessee Titans
- Title: Wide receivers coach

Personal information
- Born: February 12, 1980 (age 46); Chicago, Illinois, U.S.
- Listed height: 6 ft 0 in (1.83 m)
- Listed weight: 185 lb (84 kg)

Career information
- Position: Wide receiver (No. 83, 17)
- High school: Rich South (Richton Park, Illinois)
- College: Illinois (1999–2002)
- NFL draft: 2003: undrafted

Career history

Playing
- Philadelphia Eagles (2003–2008); New England Patriots (2009)*; Minnesota Vikings (2009–2010)
- * Offseason or practice squad member only

Coaching
- San Diego (2012) Wide receivers coach; San Jose State (2013) Wide receivers coach; Pittsburgh (2014) Wide receivers coach; New Orleans Saints (2015) Offensive assistant; Philadelphia Eagles (2016) Wide receivers coach; Kansas City Chiefs (2017–2020) Wide receivers coach; Kansas City Chiefs (2021–2022) Running backs coach; Baltimore Ravens (2023–2025) Wide receivers coach; Tennessee Titans (2026–present) Wide receivers coach

Awards and highlights
- As coach: 2× Super Bowl champion (LIV, LVII); Pioneer Football League co-champion (2012); As player: ESPY for Best Play (2009); Big Ten regular season champion (2001); MicronPC Bowl champion (1999)

Career NFL statistics
- Receptions: 152
- Receiving yards: 1,992
- Receiving touchdowns: 8
- Stats at Pro Football Reference

Gregory Alan Lewis Jr. (born February 12, 1980) is an American football coach and former player who is currently the wide receivers coach for the Tennessee Titans of the National Football League (NFL). He played wide receiver in the NFL for eight seasons. After playing college football for Illinois, Lewis was signed by the Philadelphia Eagles as an undrafted free agent in 2003. He played for the Eagles for six seasons from 2003 to 2008 and the Minnesota Vikings for two seasons from 2009 to 2010. Lewis has served as assistant coach for the University of San Diego, San Jose State, Pittsburgh Panthers, Eagles, and Kansas City Chiefs.

== Early life ==
Lewis attended Rich South High School in Richton Park, Illinois, which retired his No. 8 jersey in 2004.

== College career ==
Lewis went to the University of Illinois, joining the football team as a walk-on.

== Professional career ==
Pre-draft measurables
Height	Weight	40-yard dash	Vertical jump
5 ft 11 in (1.80 m)	172 lb (78 kg)	4.6 s	33.5 in (0.85 m)
Measurables were taken at Pro Day.

=== Philadelphia Eagles ===
After going undrafted in the 2003 NFL draft, Lewis signed with the Philadelphia Eagles as an undrafted free agent. Limited to mostly special teams his rookie season, Lewis worked his way into the receivers rotation his second year, helping the Eagles reach Super Bowl XXXIX. He caught a 30-yard touchdown in the fourth quarter for his first career touchdown reception to bring the Eagles within a field goal, but the Eagles would go on to lose 24–21.

Lewis spent six seasons with the Eagles, playing in 99 games with 24 starts between the regular season and playoffs, while recording 136 receptions for 1,879 yards and eight touchdowns.

=== New England Patriots ===
Lewis was acquired via trade along with a 2010 seventh-round draft pick by the New England Patriots in exchange for a 2009 fifth-round draft pick on March 5, 2009. Coach Bill Belichick had considered drafting Lewis in 2003, and Lewis had career games against the Patriots in the Super Bowl, and in 2007 when the Eagles nearly ended the Patriots undefeated streak. However, he was released on September 5 during finals cuts.

=== Minnesota Vikings ===
Lewis signed with the Minnesota Vikings on September 10, 2009. This reunited him with Vikings coach Brad Childress, who previously served as offensive coordinator for the Eagles.

On September 27, 2009, Lewis caught a contested 32-yard touchdown pass from quarterback Brett Favre while falling out of the back of the end zone with two seconds remaining to give the Vikings a dramatic come-from-behind 27–24 victory over the San Francisco 49ers. It was Lewis' first catch with the team and the game marked his debut as a Viking (he was inactive for the previous two games). He received an ESPY Award for Best Play along with Favre.

Lewis was re-signed to a one-year contract on February 28, 2010.

== NFL career statistics ==
Legend
**Bold**	Career high

=== Regular season ===
Year	Team	Games		Receiving					
Year	Team	GP	GS	Tgt	Rec	Yds	Avg	Lng	TD
2003	PHI	11	0	9	6	95	15.8	25	0
2004	PHI	**16**	3	37	17	183	10.8	25	0
2005	PHI	**16**	**16**	**105**	**48**	**561**	11.7	34	1
2006	PHI	**16**	3	34	24	348	14.5	45	2
2007	PHI	15	1	23	13	265	**20.4**	50	**3**
2008	PHI	**16**	0	35	19	247	13.0	**52**	1
2009	MIN	13	1	11	8	96	12.0	32	1
2010	MIN	13	5	37	17	197	11.6	33	0
Career		116	29	291	152	1,992	13.1	52	8

=== Playoffs ===
Year	Team	Games		Receiving					
Year	Team	GP	GS	Tgt	Rec	Yds	Avg	Lng	TD
2003	PHI	2	0	1	0	0	0.0	0	0
2004	PHI	**3**	**1**	**11**	**8**	**182**	**22.8**	**52**	**1**
2006	PHI	2	0	2	0	0	0.0	0	0
2008	PHI	2	0	3	1	-2	-2.0	0	0
2009	MIN	2	0	0	0	0	0.0	0	0
Career		11	1	17	9	180	20.0	52	1

== Coaching career ==
Lewis was a coaching intern for the Eagles during the rookie mini-camp in 2012. For the 2012 season under head coach Ron Caragher, Lewis was wide receivers coach for the University of San Diego Toreros football team that went 8–3, with the top 3 receivers going for 144 catches and 15 of the team's 20 touchdown passes. Caragher became head coach at San Jose State University in 2013, and Lewis joined Caragher's staff in San Jose State as wide receivers coach.

On February 19, 2014, Lewis was named the receivers coach at the University of Pittsburgh by head coach Paul Chryst.

After spending the 2015 season with the New Orleans Saints of the NFL as an offensive assistant, Lewis was hired by the Eagles as the team's wide receivers coach on January 20, 2016, and released on January 9, 2017.

Lewis was hired as the Kansas City Chiefs' wide receiver coach in January 2017. In 2019, Lewis won his first Super Bowl when the Chiefs defeated the San Francisco 49ers 31–20 in Super Bowl LIV. Three years later, Lewis won his second Super Bowl when the Chiefs defeated the Philadelphia Eagles 38–35 in Super Bowl LVII.

On March 8, 2023, the Baltimore Ravens hired Lewis as their wide receiver coach.
