= 2003 Philadelphia Eagles season =

NFL team season

- Owner: Jeffrey Lurie
- General manager: Andy Reid
- Head coach: Andy Reid
- Home stadium: Lincoln Financial Field

Results
- Record: 12–4
- Division place: 1st NFC East
- Playoffs: Won Divisional Playoffs (vs. Packers) 20–17 (OT); Lost NFC Championship (vs. Panthers) 3–14
- Pro Bowlers: QB Donovan McNabb; DT Corey Simon; CB Troy Vincent

The 2003 Philadelphia Eagles season was their 71st in the league. They matched their previous season's record, going 12–4, however, they were again upset in the NFC Championship Game. The team made the playoffs for the fourth straight year, won its third straight NFC East division title, and had the NFC's top record for the second straight season.

After losing their final game in Veterans Stadium to the Tampa Bay Buccaneers in the 2002 NFC Championship Game, Philadelphia looked to turn the page with the opening of brand-new Lincoln Financial Field, but the stadium got an inauspicious start when the Eagles dropped their first two games there, with a season-opening shutout loss again to Tampa Bay and a crushing loss to the New England Patriots. The Eagles, expected to compete for the Super Bowl, were left at a precarious 2–3, and it looked to be 2–4 before Brian Westbrook returned a punt for a touchdown to shock the New York Giants in the closing minutes of their Week 7 contest. The play turned the Eagles' season around and they won their next nine games, finishing with a 12–4 record. In the playoffs, the Eagles needed a miracle conversion on 4th and 26 to defeat the Green Bay Packers, but the magic had run out by the next week and the team fell 14–3 to the underdog Carolina Panthers at Lincoln Financial Field in the NFC Championship Game, whom they had defeated in the regular season.

A preseason holdout by running back Duce Staley resulted in a running back by committee situation by Staley, Westbrook, and Correll Buckhalter. The trio rushed for a combined 1,613 yards and 20 touchdowns and became known as "The Three-Headed Monster" of a rushing attack that passed 2,000 total yards and averaged 4.8 yards per carry.

The rushing attack, which also benefited from 355 rushing yards and three rushing touchdowns by quarterback Donovan McNabb, carried the offense, which featured a weak receiving corps that did not record a touchdown until Week 9. There were calls early in the season to replace McNabb with backup A. J. Feeley, but McNabb would find his rhythm and enjoy a great season. The defense weathered early injuries to defensive backs Bobby Taylor and Brian Dawkins to eventually surrender the seventh-fewest points in the league. Cornerback Troy Vincent, in his final season as an Eagle, was elected to the Pro Bowl. The weakness in the defense would be in stopping the run, something the team struggled with even at the height of their nine-game winning streak.

== Offseason ==
=== NFL draft ===
2003 Philadelphia Eagles draft
Round	Pick	Player	Position	College	Notes
1	15	Jerome McDougle	DE	Miami (FL)	Pick from SD
2	61	L.J. Smith	TE	Rutgers	
3	95	Billy McMullen	WR	Virginia	
4	131	Jamaal Green	DE	Miami (FL)	Compensatory
6	185	Jeremy Bridges	OT	Southern Miss	
7	244	Norman LeJeune	DB	LSU	Pick from GB
Made roster † Pro Football Hall of Fame * Made at least one Pro Bowl during career

== Staff ==
2003 Philadelphia Eagles staff
Front office: Chairman/Chief Executive Officer – Jeffrey Lurie; President – Joe Banner; Executive vice president of football operations – Andy Reid; Vice president of player personnel – Tom Heckert; Assistant director of player personnel – Jason Licht; Director of pro personnel – Scott Cohen; Head coaches: Head coach – Andy Reid; Senior assistant – Marty Mornhinweg; Offensive coaches: Offensive coordinator – Brad Childress; Quarterbacks – Pat Shurmur; Running backs – Ted Williams; Wide receivers – David Culley; Tight ends – Tom Melvin; Offensive line – Juan Castillo; Offensive assistant/quality control – Bill Shuey; Statistical analysis coordinator – Mike Frazier; Coaching intern – James Urban	Defensive coaches: Defensive coordinator – Jim Johnson; Defensive line – Tommy Brasher; Linebackers – Ron Rivera; Defensive backs/secondary – Steve Spagnuolo; Assistant defensive backs – Sean McDermott; Defensive assistant/quality control – Mike Reed; Special teams coaches: Special teams coordinator – John Harbaugh; Special teams/quality control – Dave Toub; Strength and conditioning: Head athletic trainer – Rick Burkholder; Strength and conditioning – Mike Wolf; Assistant strength and conditioning – Tom Kanavy; Assistant trainer – Eric Sugarman

== Roster ==
=== Opening training camp roster ===
Philadelphia Eagles 2003 opening training camp roster
Quarterbacks: 10 Koy Detmer; 14 A. J. Feeley; 5 Donovan McNabb; Running backs: 28 Correll Buckhalter; 41 Kevin Clemens; 25 Chris Downs ^{UR}; 34 Reno Mahe WR ^{UR}; 47 Corey McIntyre FB ^{UR}; 49 Josh Parry FB; 48 Jon Ritchie FB; 22 Duce Staley; 36 Brian Westbrook; Wide receivers: 17 Kenny Christian; 85 Byron Gasaway ^{UR}; 19 Greg Lewis ^{UR}; 16 Denero Marriott ^{UR}; 18 Billy McMullen ^{UR}; 85 Freddie Milons; 84 Freddie Mitchell; 19 Sean Morey; 87 Todd Pinkston; 16 Sean Scott; 80 James Thrash; Tight ends: 81 Brandon Davis; 81 Kori Dickerson ^{UR}; 89 Chad Lewis; 82 L. J. Smith ^{R}	Offensive linemen: 74 Jeremy Bridges T ^{R}; 64 Dante Ellington T ^{UR}; 50 Alonzo Ephraim C ^{UR}; 53 Hank Fraley C/G; 77 Artis Hicks T; 75 Reese Hicks T ^{UR}; 67 Jamaal Jackson T ^{UR}; 68 Damian Lavergne T ^{UR}; 75 Kareem Marshall T ^{UR}; 71 Jermane Mayberry G/T; 62 Scott Peters C/G; 73 Taylor Robertson G ^{UR}; 69 Jon Runyan T; 72 Tra Thomas T; 76 John Welbourn T/G; 66 Bobbie Williams G; Defensive linemen: 96 Paul Grasmanis DT; 65 Jamaal Green DE ^{R}; 62 Ron Johnson DE ^{UR}; 94 N. D. Kalu DE; 73 Ivory McCoy DE ^{UR}; 95 Jerome McDougle DE ^{R}; 91 Sam Rayburn DT ^{UR}; 90 Corey Simon DT; 79 Jeremy Slechta DT; 78 Hollis Thomas DT; 97 Darwin Walker DT; 98 Brandon Whiting DT/DE; 61 Darryl Whittington DE ^{UR}	Linebackers: 57 Keith Adams OLB; 56 Derrick Burgess OLB; 51 Carlos Antoine Emmons OLB; 59 Justin Ena MLB; 55 Tyreo Harrison MLB; 52 Darvin Lewis LB; 58 Ike Reese LB; 93 Merrill Robertson LB ^{UR}; 52 Jason Short LB ^{UR}; 53 Mark Simoneau LB; 50 Drew Wahlroos LB ^{UR}; 54 Nate Wayne LB; Defensive backs: 24 Sheldon Brown CB; 31 Daryon Brutley CB; 20 Brian Dawkins FS; 33 Clinton Hart FS; 39 David Hinton CB ^{UR}; 29 Roderick Hood CB/S ^{UR}; 27 Norman LeJeune SS ^{R}; 32 Michael Lewis SS; 46 Quintin Mikell S ^{UR}; 26 Lito Sheppard CB; 21 Bobby Taylor CB; 23 Troy Vincent CB; 43 Jamal Wallace S ^{UR}; Special teams: 2 David Akers K; 88 Mike Bartrum; 8 Dirk Johnson P; 3 Carlos Martínez K; 6 Kyle Richardson P; Notations: R: 2003 Drafted Rookie; UR: 2003 Undrafted Rookie

=== Final roster ===
Philadelphia Eagles 2003 final roster
Quarterbacks: 10 Koy Detmer; 14 A. J. Feeley; 5 Donovan McNabb; Running backs: 28 Correll Buckhalter; 34 Reno Mahe PR; 48 Jon Ritchie FB; 22 Duce Staley; 36 Brian Westbrook; Wide receivers: 83 Greg Lewis; 81 Billy McMullen; 84 Freddie Mitchell; 85 Sean Morey; 87 Todd Pinkston; 80 James Thrash; Tight ends: 86 Kori Dickerson; 89 Chad Lewis; 82 L. J. Smith	Offensive linemen: 74 Jeremy Bridges G/T; 50 Alonzo Ephraim C; 63 Hank Fraley C; 77 Artis Hicks G/T; 69 Jon Runyan T; 72 Tra Thomas T; 76 John Welbourn G; 66 Bobbie Williams G; Defensive linemen: 93 Marco Coleman DE; 79 Jim Flanigan DT; 62 Ron Johnson DE; 94 N. D. Kalu DE; 95 Jerome McDougle DE; 91 Sam Rayburn DT; 90 Corey Simon DT; 97 Darwin Walker DE/DT; 98 Brandon Whiting DE	Linebackers: 57 Keith Adams MLB; 59 Justin Ena OLB; 55 Tyreo Harrison OLB; 58 Ike Reese OLB; 53 Mark Simoneau MLB; 54 Nate Wayne OLB; Defensive backs: 24 Sheldon Brown CB; 20 Brian Dawkins FS; 33 Clinton Hart FS; 29 Roderick Hood CB/S; 27 Norman LeJeune SS; 32 Michael Lewis SS; 46 Quintin Mikell SS; 26 Lito Sheppard CB; 21 Bobby Taylor CB; 23 Troy Vincent CB; Special teams: 2 David Akers K; 88 Mike Bartrum LS; 8 Dirk Johnson P	Reserve lists: 56 Derrick Burgess LB/DE (IR); 51 Carlos Emmons LB (IR); 96 Paul Grasmanis DT (IR); 65 Jamaal Green DE (IR); 68 Damian Lavergne T (IR); 71 Jermane Mayberry G (IR); 78 Hollis Thomas DT (IR); Practice squad: 64 Dante Ellington T; 75 Joey Evans DE; 67 Jamaal Jackson T; 49 Josh Parry FB; 52 Jason Short LB; Rookies in Italics; 53 active, 7 inactive, 5 practice squad

|}

== Preseason ==
Week	Date	Opponent	Result	Record	Venue	Recap
1	August 11	at New Orleans Saints	W 27–17	1–0	Louisiana Superdome	Recap
2	August 16	at Pittsburgh Steelers	W 21–16	2–0	Heinz Field	Recap
3	August 22	New England Patriots	L 12–24	2–1	Lincoln Financial Field	Recap
4	August 28	New York Jets	L 9–17	2–2	Lincoln Financial Field	Recap

== Regular season ==
=== Schedule ===
Week	Date	Opponent	Result	Record	Venue	Recap
1	September 8	Tampa Bay Buccaneers	**L** 0–17	0–1	Lincoln Financial Field	Recap
2	September 14	New England Patriots	**L** 10–31	0–2	Lincoln Financial Field	Recap
3	Bye					
4	September 28	at Buffalo Bills	**W** 23–13	1–2	Ralph Wilson Stadium	Recap
5	October 5	**Washington Redskins**	**W** 27–25	2–2	Lincoln Financial Field	Recap
6	October 12	at **Dallas Cowboys**	**L** 21–23	2–3	Texas Stadium	Recap
7	October 19	at **New York Giants**	**W** 14–10	3–3	Giants Stadium	Recap
8	October 26	New York Jets	**W** 24–17	4–3	Lincoln Financial Field	Recap
9	November 2	at Atlanta Falcons	**W** 23–16	5–3	Georgia Dome	Recap
10	November 10	at Green Bay Packers	**W** 17–14	6–3	Lambeau Field	Recap
11	November 16	**New York Giants**	**W** 28–10	7–3	Lincoln Financial Field	Recap
12	November 23	New Orleans Saints	**W** 33–20	8–3	Lincoln Financial Field	Recap
13	November 30	at Carolina Panthers	**W** 25–16	9–3	Ericsson Stadium	Recap
14	December 7	**Dallas Cowboys**	**W** 36–10	10–3	Lincoln Financial Field	Recap
15	December 15	at Miami Dolphins	**W** 34–27	11–3	Pro Player Stadium	Recap
16	December 21	San Francisco 49ers	**L** 28–31 (OT)	11–4	Lincoln Financial Field	Recap
17	December 27	at **Washington Redskins**	**W** 31–7	12–4	FedExField	Recap

Note: Intra-division opponents are in bold text.

=== Game summaries ===
==== Week 1: vs. Tampa Bay Buccaneers ====
Week 1: Tampa Bay Buccaneers at Philadelphia Eagles – Game summary

Quarter	1	2	3	4	Total
**Buccaneers**	0	3	7	7	**17**
Eagles	0	0	0	0	**0**

at Lincoln Financial Field, Philadelphia, Pennsylvania

- Date: September 8
- Game time: 9:00 p.m. EDT
- Game weather: Cloudy, 74 °F (23.3 °C)
- Game attendance: 67,772
- Referee: Bernie Kukar
- TV announcers (ABC): Al Michaels, John Madden and Lisa Guerrero
- Game Book

Game information

**First quarter**

- No scoring plays

**Second quarter**

- TB – Martin Gramatica 23-yard field goal, 11:51. Buccaneers 3–0. **Drive: 9 plays, 26 yards, 4:44.**

**Third quarter**

- TB – Joe Jurevicius 13-yard pass from Brad Johnson (Martin Gramatica kick), 3:22. Buccaneers 10–0. **Drive: 12 plays, 80 yards, 7:20.**

**Fourth quarter**

- TB – Joe Jurevicius 7-yard pass from Brad Johnson (Martin Gramatica kick), 7:32. Buccaneers 17–0. **Drive: 14 plays, 73 yards, 8:36.**

Top passers

- TB – Brad Johnson – 27/36, 238 yards, 2 TD, INT
- PHI – Donovan McNabb – 19/36, 148 yards, INT

Top rushers

- TB – Michael Pittman – 8 rushes, 35 yards
- PHI – Donovan McNabb – 5 rushes, 55 yards

Top receivers

- TB – Keyshawn Johnson – 6 receptions, 83 yards
- PHI – Duce Staley – 7 receptions, 46 yards

The Buccaneers, who ruined the Eagles' bid for a Super Bowl the previous season by defeating them in their final game at Veterans Stadium, spoiled the opening of Lincoln Financial Field by thoroughly dominating the Eagles in a 17–0 shutout. A big run by James Thrash gave the Eagles a chance at an early field goal, but head coach Andy Reid tried a fake field goal to rookie tight end L. J. Smith, who let the ball go off of his fingertips. Early in the second quarter, Tampa Bay put up a field goal for a 3–0 lead, while the Eagles looked out of sync. A touchdown pass to Joe Jurevicius, who had made a huge reception in the 2002 NFC Championship, made it 10–0. Jurevicius caught another short touchdown on the next drive, which ate half of the fourth quarter. Brian Dawkins and Bobby Taylor both had to leave the game with injuries.

==== Week 2: vs. New England Patriots ====
Week 2: New England Patriots at Philadelphia Eagles – Game summary

Quarter	1	2	3	4	Total
**Patriots**	3	14	7	7	**31**
Eagles	0	7	0	3	**10**

at Lincoln Financial Field, Philadelphia, Pennsylvania

- Date: September 14
- Game time: 4:15 p.m. EDT
- Game weather: Mostly Cloudy, 82 °F (27.8 °C)
- Game attendance: 67,624
- Referee: Walt Coleman
- TV announcers (CBS): Greg Gumbel, Phil Simms and Armen Keteyian
- Game Book

Game information

**First quarter**

- NE – Adam Vinatieri 23-yard field goal, 1:10. Patriots 3–0. **Drive: 11 plays, 66 yards, 5:23.**

**Second quarter**

- PHI – Duce Staley 2-yard run (David Akers kick), 14:00. Eagles 7–3. **Drive: 8 plays, 67 yards, 2:10.**
- NE – Christian Fauria 8-yard pass from Tom Brady (Adam Vinatieri kick), 7:59. Patriots 10–7. **Drive: 4 plays, 35 yards, 1:12.**
- NE – Christian Fauria 5-yard pass from Tom Brady (Adam Vinatieri kick), 2:09. Patriots 17–7. **Drive: 2 plays, 14 yards, 0:43.**

**Third quarter**

- NE – Deion Branch 26-yard pass from Tom Brady (Adam Vinatieri kick), 7:02. Patriots 24–7. **Drive: 4 plays, 52 yards, 2:08.**

**Fourth quarter**

- PHI – David Akers 57-yard field goal, 10:48. Patriots 24–10. **Drive: 5 plays, -4 yards, 1:14.**
- NE – Tedy Bruschi 18-yard interception return (Adam Vinatieri kick), 5:02. Patriots 31–10.

Top passers

- NE – Tom Brady – 30/44, 255 yards, 3 TD
- PHI – Donovan McNabb – 18/46, 186 yards, 2 INT

Top rushers

- NE – Antowain Smith – 12 rushes, 25 yards
- PHI – Donovan McNabb – 5 rushes, 54 yards

Top receivers

- NE – Deion Branch – 6 receptions, 89 yards, TD
- PHI – James Thrash – 6 receptions, 80 yards

The situation went from bad to worse as the Eagles suffered a second straight disastrous loss, again at their new home. The defense, already ravaged by injuries, fought hard and held the New England Patriots to only a first-quarter field goal. Duce Staley scored Philadelphia's first points of the season early in the second quarter, but two Tom Brady touchdown passes in the second quarter made it 17–7 Patriots at halftime. Brady found Deion Branch for a touchdown in the third quarter before Eagles' placekicker David Akers booted a 57-yarder, his career high. Tedy Bruschi intercepted Donovan McNabb for a pick six in the fourth quarter, extending New England's lead to 31–10 and putting the game out of reach. In total, the offense gave up six turnovers and seven sacks as the Eagles suffered their first home loss to the Patriots in franchise history.

==== Week 4: at Buffalo Bills ====
Week 4: Philadelphia Eagles at Buffalo Bills – Game summary

Quarter	1	2	3	4	Total
**Eagles**	10	3	3	7	**23**
Bills	0	0	0	13	**13**

at Ralph Wilson Stadium, Buffalo, New York

- Date: September 28
- Game time: 1:00 p.m. EDT
- Game weather: Mostly Cloudy, 59 °F (15.0 °C)
- Game attendance: 73,305
- Referee: Bill Carollo
- TV announcers (Fox): Kenny Albert and Brian Baldinger
- Game Book

Game information

**First quarter**

- PHI – Correll Buckhalter 2-yard run (David Akers kick), 10:18. Eagles 7–0. **Drive: 8 plays, 71 yards, 4:42.**
- PHI – David Akers 26-yard field goal, 0:09. Eagles 10–0. **Drive: 16 plays, 65 yards, 8:36.**

**Second quarter**

- PHI – David Akers 34-yard field goal, 0:09. Eagles 13–0. **Drive: 8 plays, 34 yards, 1:33.**

**Third quarter**

- PHI – David Akers 22-yard field goal, 0:26. Eagles 16–0. **Drive: 14 plays, 70 yards, 9:24.**

**Fourth quarter**

- BUF – Bobby Shaw 3-yard pass from Drew Bledsoe (pass failed), 9:12. Eagles 16–6. **Drive: 11 plays, 67 yards, 3:57.**
- BUF – Drew Bledsoe 1-yard run (Rian Lindell kick), 2:49. Eagles 16–13. **Drive: 12 plays, 69 yards, 4:36.**
- PHI – Brian Westbrook 62-yard run (David Akers kick), 2:10. Eagles 23–13. **Drive: 5 plays, 80 yards, 0:39.**

Top passers

- PHI – Donovan McNabb – 18/29, 173 yards
- BUF – Drew Bledsoe – 27/43, 296 yards, TD

Top rushers

- PHI – Brian Westbrook – 11 rushes, 96 yards, TD
- BUF – Joe Burns – 8 rushes, 17 yards

Top receivers

- PHI – Todd Pinkston – 6 receptions, 60 yards
- BUF – Eric Moulds – 8 receptions, 114 yards

After two devastating losses to start the season, the Eagles used an early bye week to regroup and defeated the Buffalo Bills a 23–13. The Eagles methodically built a 16–0 lead through the first three quarters. Correll Buckhalter scored a short touchdown in the first quarter, and David Akers added three field goals. In the final period, Drew Bledsoe rallied Buffalo to two straight touchdowns, cutting the lead to 16–13. However, Brian Westbrook broke a tackle at the line of scrimmage and charged through the middle for a 62-yard touchdown run to seal the deal. Donovan McNabb, nursing a sore thumb on his throwing hand, threw for 172 yards and rushed for 47, while the defense played a solid game, especially in the first half.

==== Week 5: vs Washington Redskins ====
Week 5: Washington Redskins at Philadelphia Eagles – Game summary

Quarter	1	2	3	4	Total
Redskins	0	10	3	12	**25**
**Eagles**	3	10	7	7	**27**

at Lincoln Financial Field, Philadelphia, Pennsylvania

- Date: October 5
- Game time: 4:15 p.m. EDT
- Game weather: Partly Cloudy, 63 °F (17.2 °C)
- Game attendance: 67,792
- Referee: Ed Hochuli
- TV announcers (Fox): Joe Buck, Troy Aikman, Cris Collinsworth and Pam Oliver
- Game Book

Game information

**First quarter**

- PHI – David Akers 52-yard field goal, 4:02. Eagles 3–0. **Drive: 9 plays, 52 yards, 3:37.**

**Second quarter**

- PHI – Jon Ritchie 4-yard pass from Donovan McNabb (David Akers kick), 11:28. Eagles 10–0. **Drive: 5 plays, 18 yards, 2:46.**
- WSH – Patrick Ramsey 1-yard run (John Hall kick), 5:56. Eagles 10–7. **Drive: 3 plays, 1 yard, 1:09.**
- PHI – David Akers 36-yard field goal, 1:07. Eagles 13–7. **Drive: 9 plays, 55 yards, 4:49.**
- WSH – John Hall 48-yard field goal, 0:05. Eagles 13–10. **Drive: 5 plays, 37 yards, 1:02.**

**Third quarter**

- WSH – John Hall 45-yard field goal, 7:33. Tied 13–13. **Drive: 14 plays, 49 yards, 6:21.**
- PHI – N. D. Kalu 15-yard interception return (David Akers kick), 3:15. Eagles 20–13.

**Fourth quarter**

- WSH – John Hall 37-yard field goal, 8:56. Eagles 20–16. **Drive: 9 plays, 55 yards, 3:12.**
- PHI – Brian Westbrook 19-yard run (David Akers kick), 3:10. Eagles 27–16. **Drive: 11 plays, 70 yards, 5:46.**
- WSH – John Hall 53-yard field goal, 1:14. Eagles 27–19. **Drive: 8 plays, 31 yards, 1:56.**
- WSH – Darnerien McCants 32-yard pass from Patrick Ramsey (pass failed), 0:13. Eagles 27–25. **Drive: 5 plays, 57 yards, 1:01.**

Top passers

- WSH – Patrick Ramsey – 25/50, 271 yards, TD, 2 INT
- PHI – Donovan McNabb – 16/30, 157 yards, TD, 2 INT

Top rushers

- WSH – Trung Canidate – 8 rushes, 17 yards
- PHI – Brian Westbrook – 11 rushes, 64 yards, TD

Top receivers

- WSH – Darnerien McCants – 4 receptions, 79 yards, TD
- PHI – L. J. Smith – 4 receptions, 39 yards

In sunny 59-degree weather, and coming off a crucial win at Buffalo, the Eagles battled their division-rival Washington Redskins to a 27–25 victory. David Akers opened the scoring with a 52-yard field goal, and a short touchdown pass from Donovan McNabb to fullback Jon Ritchie gave Philadelphia a 10–0 lead in the second quarter. Redskin quarterback Patrick Ramsey rushed for a touchdown to cut into the Eagles' lead, and the teams traded field goals to make it 13–10 Eagles at halftime. In the third quarter, the Redskins tied the game on a field goal. The Eagles defense restored the lead when defensive lineman Darwin Walker hit Ramsey as he was throwing, flinging the ball into the air and into the arms of teammate N.D. Kalu who returned it 15 yards for the touchdown. After another Washington field goal in the fourth quarter, Brian Westbrook scored on 19-yard run with three minutes left to play, which put Philadelphia up 27–16 and appeared to end the game, as in Buffalo the previous week. The Redskins instead mounted a furious rally, with kicker John Hall booting a 53-yard field goal, the special teams recovering an onside kick, and Ramsey firing a 32-yard touchdown pass to Darnerien McCants with seconds remaining. However, the Eagles broke up the two-point conversion to preserve Philadelphia's first victory in Lincoln Financial Field. The defense turned in a relatively strong performance despite the absence of Pro Bowlers Brian Dawkins, Troy Vincent, and Bobby Taylor.

==== Week 6: at Dallas Cowboys ====
Week 6: Philadelphia Eagles at Dallas Cowboys – Game summary

Quarter	1	2	3	4	Total
Eagles	0	7	7	7	**21**
**Cowboys**	7	3	7	6	**23**

at Texas Stadium, Irving, Texas

- Date: October 12
- Game time: 1:00 p.m. EDT/12:00 p.m. CDT
- Game weather: Cloudy Skies, 70 °F (21.1 °C)
- Game attendance: 63,648
- Referee: Ron Blum
- TV announcers (Fox): Sam Rosen and Bill Maas
- Game Book

Game information

**First quarter**

- DAL – Randal Williams 37-yard kickoff return (Billy Cundiff kick), 14:57. Cowboys 7–0. **Drive: 0 plays, 0 yards, 0:03.**

**Second quarter**

- PHI – Brian Westbrook 5-yard run (David Akers kick), 10:20. Tied 7–7. **Drive: 9 plays, 55 yards, 4:30.**
- DAL – Billy Cundiff 51-yard field goal, 0:12. Cowboys 10–7. **Drive: 5 plays, 18 yards, 1:05.**

**Third quarter**

- DAL – Troy Hambrick 1-yard run (Billy Cundiff kick), 4:00. Cowboys 17–7. **Drive: 11 plays, 80 yards, 6:08.**
- PHI – Duce Staley 52-yard pass from Donovan McNabb (David Akers kick), 2:56. Cowboys 17–14. **Drive: 2 plays, 60 yards, 1:04.**

**Fourth quarter**

- DAL – Billy Cundiff 22-yard field goal, 14:12. Cowboys 20–14. **Drive: 8 plays, 72 yards, 3:44.**
- PHI – Correll Buckhalter 20-yard run (David Akers kick), 4:14. Eagles 21–20. **Drive: 14 plays, 61 yards, 6:45.**
- DAL – Billy Cundiff 28-yard field goal, 1:11. Cowboys 23–21. **Drive: 7 plays, 31 yards, 3:03.**

Top passers

- PHI – Donovan McNabb – 11/26, 126 yards, TD
- DAL – Quincy Carter – 14/25, 146 yards, INT

Top rushers

- PHI – Correll Buckhalter – 11 rushes, 52 yards, TD
- DAL – Troy Hambrick – 18 rushes, 46 yards, TD

Top receivers

- PHI – Duce Staley – 3 receptions, 66 yards, TD
- DAL – Terry Glenn – 5 receptions, 41 yards

The 2–2 Eagles met the 3–1 Dallas Cowboys and fell to them 23–21, their first loss to Dallas since 1999. Andy Reid tried an opening kickoff onsides kick, which had helped spark the Eagles' 2000 season opening route of Dallas, but the Cowboys' new coach, Bill Parcells, was not fooled and the gamble blew up in Philadelphia's face. Randal Williams fielded the bouncing kick and raced into the end zone untouched in three seconds – the fastest touchdown in NFL history. Brian Westbrook's five-yard touchdown run in the second quarter tied the score, but Billy Cundiff kicked a field goal just before halftime to make it 10–7 Dallas. Troy Hambrick finished a third quarter Dallas drive with a one-yard touchdown to open a 17–7 Cowboy lead. A 52-yard catch-and-run by Duce Staley on the Eagles' ensuing drive brought Philadelphia within three points, but the Cowboys answered back with another field goal. With less than five minutes left to play, Correll Buckhalter broke free for a 20-yard touchdown run, giving Philadelphia a 21–20 lead. A long kick return helped set up Dallas' go-ahead field goal. Donovan McNabb, who struggled mightily throughout the game with a thumb injury, could not advance the team into field goal range after James Thrash returned the kickoff to midfield. Westbrook, Staley, and Buckhalter combined for over 100 rushing yards and three touchdowns. The loss dropped Philadelphia to 2–3 and a repeat of a division title appeared in doubt.

==== Week 7: at New York Giants ====
Week 7: Philadelphia Eagles at New York Giants – Game summary

Quarter	1	2	3	4	Total
**Eagles**	7	0	0	7	**14**
Giants	0	3	7	0	**10**

at Giants Stadium, East Rutherford, New Jersey

- Date: October 19
- Game time: 1:00 p.m. EDT
- Game weather: Cloudy, 51 °F (10.6 °C)
- Game attendance: 78,883
- Referee: Tom White
- TV announcers (Fox): Dick Stockton, Troy Aikman, Cris Collinsworth and Pam Oliver
- Game Book

Game information

**First quarter**

- PHI – Brian Westbrook 6-yard run (David Akers kick), 3:14. Eagles 7–0. **Drive: 10 plays, 89 yards, 6:29.**

**Second quarter**

- NYG – Brett Conway 39-yard field goal, 0:22. Eagles 7–3. **Drive: 4 plays, 8 yards, 1:01.**

**Third quarter**

- NYG – Jeremy Shockey 1-yard pass from Kerry Collins (Brett Conway kick), 5:19. Giants 10–7. **Drive: 12 plays, 62 yards, 4:58.**

**Fourth quarter**

- PHI – Brian Westbrook 84-yard punt return (David Akers kick), 1:16. Eagles 14–10.

Top passers

- PHI – Donovan McNabb – 9/23, 64 yards, INT
- NYG – Kerry Collins – 22/36, 174 yards, TD

Top rushers

- PHI – Brian Westbrook – 15 rushes, 67 yards, TD
- NYG – Tiki Barber – 19 rushes, 79 yards

Top receivers

- PHI – L. J. Smith – 1 reception, 25 yards
- NYG – Jeremy Shockey – 5 receptions, 23 yards, TD

Brian Westbrook delivered the play of the year for the Eagles, returning a punt with less than two minutes left to win the game 14–10 over the New York Giants. In the first quarter, Westbrook's five-yard touchdown run (his fourth in four games) gave Philadelphia a 7–0 lead. New York got a field goal in the second quarter and a Jeremy Shockey touchdown reception in the third to take a 10–7 lead. It could have been more, as they drove inside the Philadelphia 40-yard line seven times, but usually squandered their opportunities. Meanwhile, the Eagles' offense was virtually non-existent throughout the game. Donovan McNabb had his worst game as a professional, only completing 9-of-23 passes for a meager 64 yards. Inside the two-minute warning, the Giants forced the Eagles to burn their timeouts, then punted to give it back to the dormant Philadelphia offense and end the game. However, Westbrook fielded the Jeff Feagles punt on a bounce, broke through the first few defenders, and began to race down the left sideline and into the end zone, stealing the victory and saving the Eagles' season. The 84-yard punt return was a turning point for Philadelphia, saving them from falling to 2–4 and propelling them on a what would be a nine-game winning streak.

==== Week 8: vs New York Jets ====
Week 8: New York Jets at Philadelphia Eagles – Game summary

Quarter	1	2	3	4	Total
Jets	10	0	7	0	**17**
**Eagles**	7	7	0	10	**24**

at Lincoln Financial Field, Philadelphia, Pennsylvania

- Date: October 26
- Game time: 4:15 p.m. EST
- Game weather: Cloudy, 67 °F (19.4 °C)
- Game attendance: 67,853
- Referee: Gerry Austin
- TV announcers (CBS): Greg Gumbel, Phil Simms and Armen Keteyian
- Game Book

Game information

**First quarter**

- NYJ – Doug Brien 30-yard field goal, 9:20. Jets 3–0. **Drive: 12 plays, 56 yards, 5:40.**
- PHI – Correll Buckhalter 6-yard run (David Akers kick), 5:30. Eagles 7–3. **Drive: 7 plays, 53 yards, 3:50.**
- NYJ – Santana Moss 60-yard pass from Vinny Testaverde (Doug Brien kick), 3:25. Jets 10–7. **Drive: 4 plays, 76 yards, 2:05.**

**Second quarter**

- PHI – Correll Buckhalter 7-yard run (David Akers kick), 11:36. Eagles 14–10. **Drive: 12 plays, 68 yards, 6:49.**

**Third quarter**

- NYJ – LaMont Jordan 4-yard run (Doug Brien kick), 0:04. Jets 17–14. **Drive: 7 plays, 49 yards, 3:57.**

**Fourth quarter**

- PHI – Jon Ritchie 4-yard pass from Donovan McNabb (David Akers kick), 6:42. Eagles 21–17. **Drive: 7 plays, 57 yards, 4:01.**
- PHI – David Akers 30-yard field goal, 1:12. Eagles 24–17. **Drive: 8 plays, 34 yards, 3:16.**

Top passers

- NYJ – Chad Pennington – 14/24, 154 yards, INT
- PHI – Donovan McNabb – 17/23, 141 yards, TD, INT

Top rushers

- NYJ – Curtis Martin – 20 rushes, 110 yards
- PHI – Correll Buckhalter – 15 rushes, 100 yards, 2 TD

Top receivers

- NYJ – Santana Moss – 6 receptions, 89 yards, TD
- PHI – L. J. Smith – 3 receptions, 32 yards

A week after the so-called "Miracle at the Meadowlands III", the Eagles defeated the Big Apple's other team, the New York Jets, 24–17 in a sea-saw game where the lead changed hands five times. After a 30-yard field goal gave New York the first points, Correll Buckhalter scored on a six-yard run to take the lead. Santana Moss hauled in a 60-yard bomb from Jets quarterback Vinny Testaverde to go up 10–7. In the second quarter, Buckhalter scored his second touchdown, from seven yards out, to retake the lead for Philadelphia. For the Jets, quarterback Chad Pennington, returning from a preseason injury, took over midgame as planned. After a Donovan McNabb interception in the third quarter, Pennington drove his team down the field and LaMont Jordan finished the drive with a touchdown run and a 17–14 New York lead. McNabb rebounded and led the Eagles to a go-ahead touchdown – a four-yard pass to fullback Jon Ritchie. A big tackle by Darwin Walker on LaMont Jordan on 4th and 1 led to Philadelphia's final points – a field goal by David Akers. McNabb passed for 141 yards and a touchdown, an improvement over his dismal performance against the Giants. Buckhalter had his second-career 100-yard game, along with two scores. The Eagles improved to 4–3 and were now only one game out of first place.

==== Week 9: at Atlanta Falcons ====
Week 9: Philadelphia Eagles at Atlanta Falcons – Game summary

Quarter	1	2	3	4	Total
**Eagles**	10	0	3	10	**23**
Falcons	0	13	0	3	**16**

at Georgia Dome, Atlanta, Georgia

- Date: November 2
- Game time: 4:15 p.m. EST
- Game weather: None (indoor stadium)
- Game attendance: 70,064
- Referee: Terry McAulay
- TV announcers (Fox): Sam Rosen and Bill Maas
- Game Book

Game information

**First quarter**

- PHI – David Akers 21-yard field goal, 13:26. Eagles 3–0. **Drive: 4 plays, 8 yards, 1:26.**
- PHI – Freddie Mitchell 37-yard pass from Donovan McNabb (David Akers kick), 5:03. Eagles 10–0. **Drive: 9 plays, 64 yards, 4:59.**

**Second quarter**

- ATL – T. J. Duckett 1-yard run (Jay Feely kick), 12:52. Eagles 10–7. **Drive: 12 plays, 75 yards, 7:11.**
- ATL – Jay Feely 40-yard field goal, 3:14. Tied 10–10. **Drive: 13 plays, 54 yards, 7:45.**
- ATL – Jay Feely 25-yard field goal, 0:38. Falcons 13–10. **Drive: 4 plays, 4 yards, 1:04.**

**Third quarter**

- PHI – David Akers 25-yard field goal, 10:33. Tied 13–13. **Drive: 9 plays, 66 yards, 4:27.**

**Fourth quarter**

- PHI – Duce Staley 4-yard run (David Akers kick), 14:09. Eagles 20–13. **Drive: 4 plays, 73 yards, 1:05.**
- PHI – David Akers 40-yard field goal, 7:46. Eagles 23–13. **Drive: 7 plays, 31 yards, 2:51.**
- ATL – Jay Feely 46-yard field goal, 5:18. Eagles 23–16. **Drive: 5 plays, 52 yards, 2:18.**

Top passers

- PHI – Donovan McNabb – 21/33, 312 yards, TD
- ATL – Doug Johnson – 5/10, 86 yards

Top rushers

- PHI – Correll Buckhalter – 23 rushes, 92 yards
- ATL – Warrick Dunn – 10 rushes, 68 yards

Top receivers

- PHI – L. J. Smith – 6 receptions, 97 yards
- ATL – Peerless Price – 6 receptions, 84 yards

In Week 9, the Eagles travelled to the Georgia Dome and defeated the lowly Atlanta Falcons 23–16. A turnover on the opening kickoff led to a short field goal for David Akers. Following a Lito Sheppard interception in the red zone, Donovan McNabb connected with Freddie Mitchell for a 39-yard touchdown pass – the first to a wide receiver all season for the Eagles. The second quarter belonged to Atlanta, as they scored thirteen unanswered points and went into halftime ahead 13–10. Philadelphia took care of business in the second half, tying the game on a field goal, while the defense stifled the Falcon offense, which switched quarterbacks in the third quarter. A pair of big catches by rookie tight end L.J. Smith powered a drive that ended in a Duce Staley touchdown run and a Philadelphia lead. The teams traded field goals later in the fourth quarter, but the defense kept Atlanta out of the end zone. McNabb had his first 300-yard passing game in two years, Correll Buckhalter rushed for 92 yards, and L.J. Smith had a breakout performance with six catches for 97 yards. The Eagles went to 5–3 and suddenly had three wins in a row.

==== Week 10: at Green Bay Packers ====
Week 10: Philadelphia Eagles at Green Bay Packers – Game summary

Quarter	1	2	3	4	Total
**Eagles**	0	0	3	14	**17**
Packers	0	7	0	7	**14**

at Lambeau Field, Green Bay, Wisconsin

- Date: November 10
- Game time: 9:00 p.m. EST/8:00 p.m. CST
- Game weather: Rain Showers, 39 °F (3.9 °C)
- Game attendance: 70,291
- Referee: Bill Carollo
- TV announcers (ABC): Al Michaels, John Madden and Lisa Guerrero
- Game Book

Game information

**First quarter**

- No scoring plays

**Second quarter**

- GB – Ahman Green 24-yard pass from Brett Favre (Ryan Longwell kick), 0.40. Packers 7–0. **Drive: 5 plays, 54 yards, 1:07.**

**Third quarter**

- PHI – David Akers 21-yard field goal, 9:29. Packers 7–3. **Drive: 10 plays, 52 yards, 5:31.**

**Fourth quarter**

- PHI – Donovan McNabb 1-yard run (David Akers kick), 9:22. Eagles 10–7. **Drive: 4 plays, 54 yards, 1:40.**
- GB – Ahman Green 45-yard run (Ryan Longwell kick), 7:03. Packers 14–10. **Drive: 5 plays, 66 yards, 2:19.**
- PHI – Todd Pinkston 6-yard pass from Donovan McNabb (David Akers kick), 0:27. Eagles 17–14. **Drive: 8 plays, 65 yards, 2:16.**

Top passers

- PHI – Donovan McNabb – 15/31, 198 yards, TD
- GB – Brett Favre – 14/22, 109 yards, TD, INT

Top rushers

- PHI – Duce Staley – 10 rushes, 53 yards
- GB – Ahman Green – 29 rushes, 192 yards, TD

Top receivers

- PHI – Todd Pinkston – 3 receptions, 26 yards, TD
- GB – Ahman Green – 3 receptions, 32 yards, TD

Playing in a rainy Lambeau Field on Monday Night Football, Donovan McNabb led the Eagles to a last-minute victory over Brett Favre and the Green Bay Packers. Both offenses struggled on a wet field in the first half. David Akers and Ryan Longwell each missed field goals, and the only points of the half would be a 24-yard touchdown reception by Packer halfback Ahman Green. The Eagles got on the board with a short Akers field goal after a long drive in the third quarter. Donovan McNabb then scored on a one-yard touchdown run in the fourth quarter to give Philadelphia a 10–7 lead. However, Ahman Green broke a 45-yard run to the end zone that put Green Bay back on top 14–10. The Philadelphia defense came up with a big stop to give McNabb and the offense one last chance with 2:43 left in the game. McNabb marshalled the team downfield and with less than thirty seconds remaining, he hit Todd Pinkston in the end zone with the game-winning touchdown pass. The Packers struggled to hold onto the ball (Favre especially), and turned it over three times compared to zero turnovers for the Eagles. Ahman Green rushed for 192 yards in defeat (Green Bay rushed for 241 as a team). The suddenly red-hot Eagles were now 6–3 on the season.

==== Week 11: vs New York Giants ====
Week 11: New York Giants at Philadelphia Eagles – Game summary

Quarter	1	2	3	4	Total
Giants	3	0	0	7	**10**
**Eagles**	7	7	7	7	**28**

at Lincoln Financial Field, Philadelphia, Pennsylvania

- Date: November 16
- Game time: 1:00 p.m. EST
- Game weather: Mostly Cloudy, 52 °F (11.1 °C)
- Game attendance: 67,867
- Referee: Bernie Kukar
- TV announcers (Fox): Dick Stockton, Daryl Johnston and Tony Siragusa
- Game Book

Game information

**First quarter**

- NYG – Matt Bryant 30-yard field goal, 12:41. Giants 3–0. **Drive: 4 plays, 9 yards, 2:19.**
- PHI – Correll Buckhalter 1-yard run (David Akers kick), 4:27. Eagles 7–3. **Drive: 9 plays, 61 yards, 5:05.**

**Second quarter**

- PHI – Brian Westbrook 29-yard pass from Donovan McNabb (David Akers kick), 3:36. Eagles 14–3. **Drive: 3 plays, 73 yards, 1:36.**

**Third quarter**

- PHI – Brian Westbrook 4-yard run (David Akers kick), 3:21. Eagles 21–3. **Drive: 8 plays, 95 yards, 4:31.**

**Fourth quarter**

- NYG – Tiki Barber 10-yard pass from Kerry Collins (Matt Bryant kick), 12:54. Eagles 21–10. **Drive: 11 plays, 79 yards, 5:27.**
- PHI – Brian Westbrook 5-yard pass from Donovan McNabb (David Akers kick), 5:26. Eagles 28–10. **Drive: 5 plays, 55 yards, 3:02.**

Top passers

- NYG – Kerry Collins – 25/44, 268 yards, TD, INT
- PHI – Donovan McNabb – 24/30, 314 yards, 2 TD

Top rushers

- NYG – Tiki Barber – 19 rushes, 111 yards
- PHI – Brian Westbrook – 9 rushes, 48 yards, TD

Top receivers

- NYG – David Tyree – 5 receptions, 106 yards
- PHI – Brian Westbrook – 5 receptions, 60 yards, 2 TD

Playing at home, the Eagles dominated the New York Giants in an easy 28–10 rout. The Giants scored first on a short field goal, but the Eagles answered back late in the first quarter when Donovan McNabb drove the team down the field, setting up a one-yard touchdown by Correll Buckhalter. Brian Westbrook scored on a 29-yard pass play in the second quarter and a four-yard run in the third quarter as Philadelphia went ahead 21–3. Tiki Barber, who rushed for over 100 yards, scored in the fourth quarter, but Westbrook took in his third touchdown on a short pass to end the scoring. McNabb had one of his best games, completing 24 of 30 passes for 314 yards and a pair of touchdowns. Westbrook, developing a reputation as a 'Giant killer,' had 108 all-purpose yards to go along with his three touchdowns. The win moved the Eagles to 7–3 and virtually knocked the reeling Giants out of contention, while A Dallas loss allowed the Eagles to move into a tie for first place in the NFC East.

==== Week 12: vs New Orleans Saints ====
Week 12: New Orleans Saints at Philadelphia Eagles – Game summary

Quarter	1	2	3	4	Total
Saints	0	7	7	6	**20**
**Eagles**	10	10	3	10	**33**

at Lincoln Financial Field, Philadelphia, Pennsylvania

- Date: November 23
- Game time: 1:00 p.m. EST
- Game weather: Mostly Cloudy, 56 °F (13.3 °C)
- Game attendance: 67,802
- Referee: Walt Anderson
- TV announcers (Fox): Sam Rosen and Bill Maas
- Game Book

Game information

**First quarter**

- PHI – David Akers 36-yard field goal, 12:09. Eagles 3–0. **Drive: 8 plays, 67 yards, 2:51.**
- PHI – Brian Westbrook 15-yard run (David Akers kick), 4:25. Eagles 10–0. **Drive: 6 plays, 80 yards, 3:14.**

**Second quarter**

- PHI – Correll Buckhalter 1-yard run (David Akers kick), 2:38. Eagles 17–0. **Drive: 5 plays, 50 yards, 2:46.**
- NO – Boo Williams 6-yard pass from Aaron Brooks (John Carney kick), 1:47. Eagles 17–7. **Drive: 3 plays, 72 yards, 0:51.**
- PHI – David Akers 41-yard field goal, 0:05. Eagles 20–7. **Drive: 7 plays, 42 yards, 1:42.**

**Third quarter**

- PHI – David Akers 42-yard field goal, 13:16. Eagles 23–7. **Drive: 4 plays, -2 yards, 1:26.**
- NO – Deuce McAllister 76-yard run (John Carney kick), 12:58. Eagles 23–14. **Drive: 1 play, 76 yards, 0:18.**

**Fourth quarter**

- PHI – David Akers 33-yard field goal, 10:01. Eagles 26–14. **Drive: 10 plays, 66 yards, 5:39.**
- PHI – Jon Ritchie 2-yard pass from Donovan McNabb (David Akers kick), 5:28. Eagles 33–14. **Drive: 4 plays, 58 yards, 2:18.**
- NO – Deuce McAllister 22-yard run (pass failed), 3:39. Eagles 33–20. **Drive: 5 plays, 64 yards, 1:49.**

Top passers

- NO – Aaron Brooks – 24/39, 287 yards, TD
- PHI – Donovan McNabb – 16/25, 259 yards, TD

Top rushers

- NO – Deuce McAllister – 19 rushes, 184 yards, 2 TD
- PHI – Duce Staley – 8 rushes, 77 yards

Top receivers

- NO – Boo Williams – 9 receptions, 110 yards, TD
- PHI – Brian Westbrook – 3 receptions, 47 yards

In a game that featured 272 penalty yards (171 of them by the Eagles on fourteen fouls), the Eagles topped the 5–5 New Orleans Saints 33–20. Todd Pinkston pulled down a 48-yard bomb to open the game, and the drive ended in a chip shot David Akers field goal. Brian Westbrook scored on a 15-yard run and it 10–0 Eagles. Correll Buckhalter scored in the second quarter as Philadelphia pulled away. Saints quarterback Aaron Brooks completed a touchdown pass later in the quarter, but Akers kicked another field goal to end the half 20–7 Philadelphia. After another Akers field goal, Deuce McAllister broke a 76-yard touchdown run to narrow the score to 23–14. The Eagles, who moved the ball easily all game, responded with another field goal and a Donovan McNabb to fullback Jon Ritchie touchdown pass to open a 33–14 lead. McAllister scored again, but the conversion failed and Philadelphia had won its sixth straight. McNabb threw for 259 yards and did not allow an interception for the fourth consecutive week. Duce Staley, McNabb, Westbrook, and Buckhalter combined for 201 rushing yards to counter the 177 rushing yards by McAllister.

==== Week 13: at Carolina Panthers ====
Week 13: Philadelphia Eagles at Carolina Panthers – Game summary

Quarter	1	2	3	4	Total
**Eagles**	7	3	3	12	**25**
Panthers	3	0	7	6	**16**

at Ericsson Stadium, Charlotte, North Carolina

- Date: November 30
- Game time: 1:00 p.m. EST
- Game weather: Sunny skies, 59 °F (15.0 °C)
- Game attendance: 72,977
- Referee: Walt Coleman
- TV announcers (Fox): Dick Stockton, Daryl Johnston and Chris Myers
- Game Book

Game information

**First quarter**

- CAR – John Kasay 20-yard field goal, 9:34. Panthers 3–0. **Drive: 9 plays, 34 yards, 5:14.**
- PHI – Duce Staley 2-yard run (David Akers kick), 4:05. Eagles 7–3. **Drive: 10 plays, 68 yards, 5:29.**

**Second quarter**

- PHI – David Akers 35-yard field goal, 3:10. Eagles 10–3. **Drive: 11 plays, 55 yards, 5:44.**

**Third quarter**

- PHI – David Akers 48-yard field goal, 7:16. Eagles 13–3. **Drive: 5 plays, 31 yards, 2:52.**
- CAR – Steve Smith 24-yard pass from Jake Delhomme (John Kasay kick), 2:45. Eagles 13–10. **Drive: 7 plays, 70 yards, 4:31.**

**Fourth quarter**

- PHI – David Akers 38-yard field goal, 12:55. Eagles 16–10. **Drive: 11 plays, 61 yards, 4:50.**
- PHI – James Thrash 10-yard pass from Donovan McNabb (pass failed), 11:56. Eagles 22–10. **Drive: 2 plays, 11 yards, 0:44.**
- CAR – Muhsin Muhammad 23-yard pass from Jake Delhomme (kick failed, wide right), 6:42. Eagles 22–16. **Drive: 6 plays, 80 yards, 1:54.**
- PHI – David Akers 29-yard field goal, 0:25. Eagles 25–16. **Drive: 9 plays, 57 yards, 5:16.**

Top passers

- PHI – Donovan McNabb – 18/26, 182 yards, TD, INT
- CAR – Jake Delhomme – 18/29, 216 yards, 2 TD

Top rushers

- PHI – Brian Westbrook – 12 rushes, 64 yards
- CAR – Stephen Davis – 23 rushes, 115 yards

Top receivers

- PHI – Freddie Mitchell – 3 receptions, 40 yards
- CAR – Steve Smith – 5 receptions, 80 yards, TD

The 8–3 Eagles and 8–3 Carolina Panthers squared off in a key battle for NFC supremacy and the Eagles emerged with the win. A rare Donovan McNabb interception allowed Carolina to score a quick field goal. But he rebounded, leading the Eagles on a 10-play drive capped by a touchdown plunge by Duce Staley. In the second quarter, David Akers connected for his first field goal. He was good from 48 yards out in the third quarter to put Philadelphia up 13–3. Carolina's offense then struck when Jake Delhomme found Steve Smith for a 24-yard touchdown pass to make it 13–10 going into the final quarter. A long drive by McNabb ended in a big Akers field goal. Then, the defense provided a big play when a blitz by linebacker Nate Wayne caused a fumble, recovered by Darwin Walker. This set up a McNabb 10-yard touchdown pass to James Thrash, who was pushed into the end zone by Carolina defenders trying to tackle him. The two-point conversion by Philadelphia failed. Delhomme completed another touchdown, this one to Muhsin Muhammad, but kicker John Kasay missed the extra point, leaving the score 22–16. Trying to burn the clock, McNabb slowly marched the Eagles down the field and Akers came on to kick his fourth field goal, giving the Eagles a nine-point lead. While Akers was 4-for-4 on field goals and won NFC Special Teams Player of the Week, Kasay was 1-for-4 with a missed extra point. Staley, Correll Buckhalter, and Brian Westbrook combined for 118 rushing yards, while McNabb was efficient, completing 18-of-26 passes. The big win moved Philadelphia to 9–3, with the top record in their conference.

==== Week 14: vs Dallas Cowboys ====
Week 14: Dallas Cowboys at Philadelphia Eagles – Game summary

Quarter	1	2	3	4	Total
Cowboys	3	7	0	0	**10**
**Eagles**	0	10	9	17	**36**

at Lincoln Financial Field, Philadelphia, Pennsylvania

- Date: December 7
- Game time: 1:00 p.m. EST
- Game weather: Partly Cloudy, 30 °F (−1.1 °C)
- Game attendance: 69,773
- Referee: Gerry Austin
- TV announcers (Fox): Joe Buck, Troy Aikman, Cris Collinsworth and Pam Oliver
- Game Book

Game information

**First quarter**

- DAL – Billy Cundiff 29-yard field goal, 3:43. Cowboys 3–0. **Drive: 6 plays, 34 yards, 2:58.**

**Second quarter**

- PHI – David Akers 22-yard field goal, 14:56. Tied 3–3. **Drive: 8 plays, 65 yards, 3:47.**
- PHI – Brian Westbrook 16-yard pass from Donovan McNabb (David Akers kick), 3:15. Eagles 10–3. **Drive: 7 plays, 79 yards, 4:01.**
- DAL – Jeff Robinson 3-yard pass from Quincy Carter (Billy Cundiff kick), 0:26. Tied 10–10. **Drive: 7 plays, 61 yards, 2:49.**

**Third quarter**

- PHI – Duce Staley 5-yard pass from Donovan McNabb (David Akers kick), 12:25. Eagles 17–10. **Drive: 5 plays, 27 yards, 1:03.**
- PHI – Matt Lehr fumble out of bounds in end zone for safety, 2:25. Eagles 19–10

**Fourth quarter**

- PHI – L. J. Smith 6-yard pass from Donovan McNabb (David Akers kick), 12:52. Eagles 26–10. **Drive: 8 plays, 68 yards, 4:33.**
- PHI – David Akers 21-yard field goal, 6:06. Eagles 29–10. **Drive: 9 plays, 68 yards, 4:57.**
- PHI – Correll Buckhalter 64-yard run (David Akers kick), 1:47. Eagles 36–10. **Drive: 2 plays, 72 yards, 0:19.**

Top passers

- DAL – Quincy Carter – 15/24, 93 yards, TD, 2 INT
- PHI – Donovan McNabb – 18/34, 240 yards, 3 TD

Top rushers

- DAL – Troy Hambrick – 17 rushes, 75 yards
- PHI – Correll Buckhalter – 13 rushes, 115 yards, TD

Top receivers

- DAL – Jason Witten – 3 receptions, 35 yards
- PHI – Freddie Mitchell – 3 receptions, 58 yards

In another key game, with the NFC East essentially at stake, the Eagles crushed the Bill Parcells-led Dallas Cowboys 36–10. Dallas tried early to establish their running game, and late in the first quarter, they scored the game's first points on a field goal. Philadelphia evened the score in the second quarter, then took the lead when Donovan McNabb guided the offense down the field and tossed a short pass to Brian Westbrook, who broke several tackles on his 16-yard scamper to the end zone. Dallas responded with a long drive that ended in a Quincy Carter touchdown pass, sending the game to halftime tied 10–10. The Eagles would own the second half. Sheldon Brown picked off Carter, setting up a shovel pass touchdown to Duce Staley. Later, a botched shotgun ended with Carter kicking the ball out of the endzone on an intentional safety as Philadelphia assumed a 19–10 lead. Another interception, this one by Bobby Taylor, resulted in tight end L.J. Smith's first career touchdown reception. David Akers added a field goal in the fourth quarter, and a 64-yard burst through the middle by Correll Buckhalter in the final minutes made it 36–10. The defense, especially the pass defense, absolutely shut Dallas down in the final two quarters. McNabb finished with 248 passing yards and three touchdowns and Buckhalter had 115 yards on 13 carries. The Eagles record went to 10–3, and the team had all but wrapped up their third straight division title.

==== Week 15: at Miami Dolphins ====
Week 15: Philadelphia Eagles at Miami Dolphins – Game summary

Quarter	1	2	3	4	Total
**Eagles**	14	10	0	10	**34**
Dolphins	7	10	7	3	**27**

at Pro Player Stadium, Miami Gardens, Florida

- Date: December 15
- Game time: 9:00 p.m. EST
- Game weather: Partly Cloudy, 70 °F (21.1 °C)
- Game attendance: 73,780
- Referee: Ron Winter
- TV announcers (ABC): Al Michaels, John Madden and Lisa Guerrero
- Game Book

Game information

**First quarter**

- PHI – Brian Westbrook 21-yard run (David Akers kick), 13:49. Eagles 7–0. **Drive: 3 plays, 80 yards, 1:11.**
- MIA – Jay Fiedler 1-yard run (Olindo Mare kick), 5:49. Tied 7–7. **Drive: 6 plays, 63 yards, 3:15.**
- PHI – Donovan McNabb 1-yard run (David Akers kick), 1:53. Eagles 14–7. **Drive: 8 plays, 80 yards, 3:56.**

**Second quarter**

- MIA – Travis Minor 2-yard run (Olindo Mare kick), 14:55. Tied 14–14. **Drive: 5 plays, 70 yards, 1:58.**
- PHI – Brian Westbrook 25-yard pass from Freddie Mitchell (David Akers kick), 11:08. Eagles 21–14. **Drive: 7 plays, 75 yards, 3:47.**
- PHI – David Akers 46-yard field goal, 2:50. Eagles 24–14. **Drive: 7 plays, 40 yards, 3:12.**
- MIA – Olindo Mare 27-yard field goal, 0:26. Eagles 24–17. **Drive: 9 plays, 69 yards, 2:24.**

**Third quarter**

- MIA – Ricky Williams 3-yard run (Olindo Mare kick), 9:44. Tied 24–24. **Drive: 10 plays, 80 yards, 5:16.**

**Fourth quarter**

- PHI – Correll Buckhalter 2-yard run (David Akers kick), 14:53. Eagles 31–24. **Drive: 7 plays, 62 yards, 3:45.**
- PHI – David Akers 42-yard field goal, 2:00. Eagles 34–24. **Drive: 4 plays, 8 yards, 0:26.**
- MIA – Olindo Mare 50-yard field goal, 0:14. Eagles 34–27. **Drive: 8 plays, 36 yards, 1:46.**

Top passers

- PHI – Donovan McNabb – 15/27, 236 yards, INT
- MIA – Jay Fiedler – 21/40, 240 yards, 2 INT

Top rushers

- PHI – Brian Westbrook – 8 rushes, 59 yards, TD
- MIA – Ricky Williams – 18 rushes, 107 yards, TD

Top receivers

- PHI – Brian Westbrook – 3 receptions, 45 yards, TD
- MIA – Randy McMichael – 7 receptions, 95 yards, TD

On a Monday Night Football matchup in Miami, the Eagles had roughly 20,000 fans who made the trip in attendance as they beat the 8–4 Dolphins in a shootout. A 59-yard bomb to Todd Pinkston opened the game, and two plays later, Brian Westbrook danced through the defense and into the end zone on a 21-yard run for a quick touchdown. The Miami Dolphins answered with a touchdown, and on the Eagles' ensuing possession, Donovan McNabb took it in himself for a score. Quickly, the Dolphins came back with another touchdown, but Philadelphia retook the lead when Freddie Mitchell completed a 25-yard touchdown pass to Westbrook, who beat linebacker Zach Thomas, on a trick play. The teams traded field goals before halftime, and in the third quarter a rushing touchdown by Ricky Williams tied the game at 24–24. In the fourth quarter, Correll Buckhalter, on a short sweep, dove over the pylon for the go-ahead touchdown. The Eagles would drain the clock on their next drive and eventually added a field goal to take a ten-point lead and put the game away. The Eagles scored four touchdowns on a defense that had only given up 17 all season. Their record improved to 11–3 and their winning streak was now at nine games.

==== Week 16: vs San Francisco 49ers ====
Week 16: San Francisco 49ers at Philadelphia Eagles – Game summary

Quarter	1	2	3	4	OT	Total
**49ers**	7	7	3	11	3	**31**
Eagles	0	14	7	7	0	**28**

at Lincoln Financial Field, Philadelphia, Pennsylvania

- Date: December 21
- Game time: 4:15 p.m. EST
- Game weather: Clear, 35 °F (1.7 °C)
- Game attendance: 67,866
- Referee: Tom White
- TV announcers (Fox): Joe Buck, Troy Aikman, Cris Collinsworth and Pam Oliver
- Game Book

Game information

**First quarter**

- SF – Kevan Barlow 15-yard pass from Jeff Garcia (Todd Peterson kick), 5:24. 49ers 7–0. **Drive: 6 plays, 57 yards, 2:49.**

**Second quarter**

- PHI – Duce Staley 7-yard run (David Akers kick), 14:07. Tied 7–7. **Drive: 2 plays, 20 yards, 0:33.**
- PHI – Duce Staley 1-yard run (David Akers kick), 8:08. Eagles 14–7. **Drive: 2 plays, 40 yards, 0:47.**
- SF – Brandon Lloyd 33-yard pass from Jeff Garcia (Todd Peterson kick), 1:58. Tied 14–14. **Drive: 6 plays, 82 yards, 2:30.**

**Third quarter**

- PHI – Brian Westbrook 81-yard punt return (David Akers kick), 12:41. Eagles 21–14.
- SF – Todd Peterson 33-yard field goal, 6:56. Eagles 21–17. **Drive: 12 plays, 62 yards, 5:45.**

**Fourth quarter**

- SF – Todd Peterson 25-yard field goal, 14:56. Eagles 21–20. **Drive: 10 plays, 61 yards, 4:55.**
- SF – Kevan Barlow 1-yard run (Jeff Garcia–Brandon Lloyd pass), 5:03. 49ers 28–21. **Drive: 9 plays, 63 yards, 5:25.**
- PHI – Todd Pinkston 19-yard pass from Donovan McNabb (David Akers kick), 1:02. Tied 28–28. **Drive: 10 plays, 65 yards, 4:01.**

**Overtime**

- SF – Todd Peterson 22-yard field goal, 13:55. 49ers 31–28. **Drive: 2 plays, 0 yards, 0:42.**

Top passers

- SF – Jeff Garcia – 15/29, 225 yards, 2 TD
- PHI – Donovan McNabb – 17/27, 238 yards, TD, 2 INT

Top rushers

- SF – Kevan Barlow – 30 rushes, 154 yards, TD
- PHI – Duce Staley – 11 rushes, 53 yards, 2 TD

Top receivers

- SF – Jed Weaver – 3 receptions, 61 yards
- PHI – Todd Pinkston – 5 receptions, 121 yards, TD

A home overtime loss to the San Francisco 49ers snapped the Eagles' nine-game winning streak. A bad snap led to an early field goal miss for San Francisco, but after an Eagles 3-and-out, the 49ers took back over and scored on a 15-yard screen pass to Kevan Barlow. The defense then tightened and creating a turnover that led to a short Duce Staley touchdown run. Todd Pinkston fumbled away a touchdown out of the endzone after catching a long pass from Donovan McNabb. The Eagles took a 14–7 lead on another short-yardage Staley touchdown. A 33-yard pass from Garcia to Brandon Lloyd tied the score at halftime. Before the half was over, 49ers star Terrell Owens had broken his collarbone, and Eagles starting linebacker Carlos Emmons had broken his leg – a big blow for the playoffs. Brian Westbrook returned a punt 81 yards for a touchdown in the third quarter – bringing back recent memories of his big touchdown in the Meadowlands. San Francisco answered with two fields goals and a touchdown by Barlow (followed by a successful two-point conversion) to take a 28–21 lead. McNabb rallied the Eagles, driving them down the field (with Freddie Mitchell coming up with a big 4th down reception). McNabb beat the blitz and Pinkston made a backward diving catch to tie the game with a minute left. In overtime, Tony Parrish picked off McNabb and returned it inside the Eagles 5-yard line. Todd Peterson kicked the game winner and the Eagles' streak ended. McNabb had two interceptions and David Akers missed two field goals. Pinkston had 121 receiving yards and a touchdown, but Barlow rushed for 154 for San Francisco. With the loss, the Eagles dropped their record to 11–4.

==== Week 17: at Washington Redskins ====
Week 17: Philadelphia Eagles at Washington Redskins – Game summary

Quarter	1	2	3	4	Total
**Eagles**	7	14	7	3	**31**
Redskins	0	7	0	0	**7**

at FedExField, Landover, Maryland

- Date: December 27
- Game time: 8:30 p.m. EST
- Game weather: Clear, 46 °F (7.8 °C)
- Game attendance: 76,766
- Referee: Terry McAulay
- TV announcers (ESPN): Mike Patrick, Joe Theismann, Paul Maguire and Suzy Kolber
- Game Book

Game information

**First quarter**

- PHI – Chad Lewis 3-yard pass from Donovan McNabb (David Akers kick), 7:07. Eagles 7–0. **Drive: 8 plays, 57 yards, 4:02.**

**Second quarter**

- PHI – Donovan McNabb 1-yard run (David Akers kick), 12:21. Eagles 14–0. **Drive: 14 plays, 96 yards, 8:40.**
- PHI – Freddie Mitchell 8-yard pass from Donovan McNabb (David Akers kick), 9:29. Eagles 21–0. **Drive: 3 plays, 19 yards, 1:32.**
- WSH – Rock Cartwright 1-yard run (John Hall kick), 2:53. Eagles 21–7. **Drive: 10 plays, 76 yards, 6:36.**

**Third quarter**

- PHI – Correll Buckhalter 11-yard pass from Donovan McNabb (David Akers kick), 8:16. Eagles 28–7. **Drive: 12 plays, 74 yards, 6:44.**

**Fourth quarter**

- PHI – David Akers 26-yard field goal, 2:00. Eagles 31–7. **Drive: 8 plays, 49 yards, 3:52.**

Top passers

- PHI – Donovan McNabb – 23/32, 242 yards, 3 TD
- WSH – Tim Hasselbeck – 21/32, 192 yards, INT

Top rushers

- PHI – Correll Buckhalter – 13 rushes, 54 yards
- WSH – Rock Cartwright – 12 rushes, 43 yards, TD

Top receivers

- PHI – Freddie Mitchell – 4 receptions, 47 yards, TD
- WSH – Laveranues Coles – 6 receptions, 87 yards

Playing on a Saturday night to clinch the NFC East title and a first-round bye, the Eagles walloped the Washington Redskins 31–7. Donovan McNabb called for a quick snap and threw the ball to Chad Lewis for a touchdown when he noticed Washington had left him uncovered for Philadelphia's first score. A 96-yard drive, the longest of the season, ended with McNabb bootlegging it into the end zone as Philadelphia took control early. Freddie Mitchell made it 21–0 Philadelphia with a touchdown reception later in the second quarter. Rock Cartwright scored a one-yard touchdown a few minutes later, but that was all Washington would get. Correll Buckhalter added a touchdown and David Akers kicked a field goal as Philadelphia cruised 31–7. McNabb passed for 242 yards and three touchdowns, Todd Pinkston had 74 receiving yards, and the defense recorded five sacks. However, Brian Westbrook, one of the top weapons of the Philadelphia offense, tore his biceps muscle and was lost for the playoffs. The Eagles ended up clinching the NFC's number one seed for the second straight year once the Rams were upset by the Lions the following day.

=== Standings ===
NFC East
	W	L	T	PCT	DIV	CONF	PF	PA	STK
^{(1)} Philadelphia Eagles	12	4	0	.750	5–1	9–3	374	287	W1
^{(6)} Dallas Cowboys	10	6	0	.625	5–1	8–4	289	260	L1
Washington Redskins	5	11	0	.313	1–5	3–9	287	372	L3
New York Giants	4	12	0	.250	1–5	3–9	243	387	L8

== Postseason ==
Round	Date	Opponent (seed)	Result	Record	Venue	Recap
Wild Card	First-round bye					
Divisional	January 11	Green Bay Packers (4)	W 20–17 (OT)	1–0	Lincoln Financial Field	Recap
NFC Championship	January 18	Carolina Panthers (3)	L 3–14	1–1	Lincoln Financial Field	Recap

=== Game summaries ===
==== NFC Divisional Playoffs: vs. (4) Green Bay Packers ====
NFC Divisional Playoffs: (4) Green Bay Packers at (1) Philadelphia Eagles – Game summary

Quarter	1	2	3	4	OT	Total
Packers	14	0	0	3	0	17
Eagles	0	7	0	10	3	20

at Lincoln Financial Field, Philadelphia, Pennsylvania

- Date: January 11
- Game time: 4:30 p.m. EST
- Game weather: Clear, 25 °F (−3.9 °C)
- Game attendance: 67,707
- Referee: Ed Hochuli
- TV announcers (Fox): Joe Buck, Troy Aikman, Cris Collinsworth and Pam Oliver
- Game Book

Game information

First quarter

- GB – Robert Ferguson 40-yard pass from Brett Favre (Ryan Longwell kick), 7:37. Packers 7–0. Drive: 1 play, 40 yards, 0:04.
- GB – Robert Ferguson 17-yard pass from Brett Favre (Ryan Longwell kick), 1:22. Packers 14–0. Drive: 8 plays, 77 yards, 4:19.

Second quarter

- PHI – Duce Staley 7-yard pass from Donovan McNabb (David Akers kick), 6:29. Packers 14–7. Drive: 6 plays, 77 yards, 3:03.

Third quarter

- No scoring plays

Fourth quarter

- PHI – Todd Pinkston 12-yard pass from Donovan McNabb (David Akers kick), 14:48. Tied 14–14. Drive: 8 plays, 89 yards, 4:59.
- GB – Ryan Longwell 21-yard field goal, 10:22. Packers 17–14. Drive: 5 plays, 48 yards, 2:00.
- PHI – David Akers 37-yard field goal, 0:05. Tied 17–17. Drive: 12 plays, 61 yards, 2:16.

Overtime

- PHI – David Akers 31-yard field goal, 10:12. Eagles 20–17. Drive: 6 plays, 21 yards, 2:45.

Top passers

- GB – Brett Favre – 15/28, 180 yards, 2 TD, INT
- PHI – Donovan McNabb – 21/39, 248 yards, 2 TD

Top rushers

- GB – Ahman Green – 25 rushes, 156 yards
- PHI – Donovan McNabb – 11 rushes, 107 yards

Top receivers

- GB – Robert Ferguson – 4 receptions, 65 yards, 2 TD
- PHI – Todd Pinkston – 7 receptions, 95 yards, TD

In what became known as the "4th and 26 game", the Eagles came back and beat the Green Bay Packers in one of the most dramatic playoff games in their history. Inspired after the death of his father, Brett Favre led the Packers to victories in their final four games to win the NFC North Division, then led the team into overtime against the Seattle Seahawks in a game eventually won on an interception return by former Eagle Al Harris. The Packers were proclaimed by experts as the "team of destiny" and had the sympathy of the nation. The Eagles, who finished 12–4, had ended the season with nine wins in ten games, but had some injuries on defense and were without running back Brian Westbrook for the playoffs. On a wall in the Eagles' locker room, it was written, "If they're the team of destiny, where does that leave us?"

The Eagles offense came out sluggishly, failing to record a first down on their first three drives. One play after Donovan McNabb turned the ball over on a fumble, Brett Favre hit Robert Ferguson with a 40-yard touchdown pass after Ferguson had burnt the Philadelphia coverage. A 44-yard scramble by McNabb got Philadelphia into the Green Bay red zone, but David Akers missed a 33-yard field goal. Favre promptly marched the Packers down the field and found Ferguson again for a 7-yard touchdown and it was 14–0 Packers as the first quarter came to a close. In the second quarter, the Eagles went to the air and McNabb tossed a big 45-yard pass to Todd Pinkston, then fired a quick 7-yard touchdown pass to Duce Staley to cut the Packer lead in half. Late in the half, the defense came up with a goal line stand after Green Bay had 1st and goal from the four-yard line. On 4th and 1, Packer running back Ahman Green was stuffed and the game went to halftime 14–7.

On their two possessions in the third quarter, the Packers got inside the Philadelphia 40-yard line, but they failed to score both times. The Eagles, again attacking through air, drove it into the Green Bay red zone. On the first play of the fourth quarter, McNabb scrambled to the right and found Pinkston in the front right corner of the end zone for the game-tying touchdown. Favre completed a 44-yard bomb to Javon Walker to get inside the Eagles 10-yard line a few minutes later, but the Packers settled for a field goal and went up 17–14. With 8:44 left to play, the Packers took back over and began a long drive that drained the clock. The drive stalled at the Philadelphia 41-yard line, and the Packers decided to punt on 4th and 1 with just over two minutes left in regulation. The Eagles took over and immediately Staley burst forward for 22 yards, but a costly sack and two incomplete passes left the Eagles at 4th and 26 from their own 26-yard line. On what looked to potentially be the final play of their season, McNabb fired a laser over the middle that Freddie Mitchell came down with for a 28-yard gain despite a hard shot from Marques Anderson and Darren Sharper at the Packers 47-yard line. Following a five-yard encroachment penalty on the Packers' Cletidus Hunt, McNabb completed another pass to Mitchell and a 10-yarder to Pinkston to get to the Packer 19-yard line. With seconds left in regulation, Akers booted the 33-yard field goal home and the game went to overtime. After a three-and-out by Philadelphia, Favre was chased on his first play and heaved the ball into the air, almost like a punt. Brian Dawkins caught the pass and returned it well inside Packer territory. McNabb got the Eagles up to the Packer 13-yard line and Akers came on to kick the game-winner, sending Philadelphia to the NFC Championship and leaving Green Bay's "destiny" in ashes. McNabb had thrown for 248 yards and two scores, while also running 11 times for 107 yards. Pinkston caught 7 passes for 95 yards in one of the biggest games of his career. Ahman Green ran for 156 yards off of the Eagles defense.

==== NFC Championship: vs. (3) Carolina Panthers ====
NFC Championship: (3) Carolina Panthers at (1) Philadelphia Eagles – Game summary

Quarter	1	2	3	4	Total
Panthers	0	7	7	0	14
Eagles	0	3	0	0	3

at Lincoln Financial Field, Philadelphia, Pennsylvania

- Date: January 18
- Game time: 6:30 p.m. EST
- Game weather: Mostly Cloudy, 33 °F (0.6 °C)
- Game attendance: 65,158
- Referee: Bernie Kukar
- TV announcers (Fox): Joe Buck, Troy Aikman, Cris Collinsworth and Pam Oliver
- Game Book

Game information

First quarter

- No scoring plays

Second quarter

- CAR – Muhsin Muhammad 24-yard pass from Jake Delhomme (John Kasay kick), 10:12. Panthers 7–0. Drive: 8 plays, 79 yards, 4:48.
- PHI – David Akers 41-yard field goal, 2:56. Panthers 7–3. Drive: 14 plays, 44 yards, 7:16.

Third quarter

- CAR – DeShaun Foster 1-yard run, 4:11. Panthers 14–3. Drive: 4 plays, 37 yards, 2:07.

Fourth quarter

- No scoring plays

Top passers

- CAR – Jake Delhomme – 9/14, 101 yards, TD
- PHI – Donovan McNabb – 10/22, 100 yards, 3 INT

Top rushers

- CAR – Stephen Davis – 19 rushes, 76 yards
- PHI – Duce Staley – 13 rushes, 79 yards

Top receivers

- CAR – Muhsin Muhammad – 2 receptions, 39 yards, TD
- PHI – Chad Lewis – 4 receptions, 69 yards

In a monumentally disappointing result for Philadelphia, the Eagles lost the NFC Championship 14–3 to the Carolina Panthers. It was their third straight championship game defeat, and second in a row at home. They had beaten the Panthers 25–16 in Week 13 in Carolina, but the Panthers' opportunistic defense disrupted the wounded Eagles offense, holding them to three points and dashing their hopes for a Super Bowl a week after the 4th and 26 miracle. The Panthers, just two years removed from a 1–15 season, went 11–5 in 2003, winning the NFC South. In the playoffs, they defeated Dallas 29–10 and beat the St. Louis Rams in double overtime on a 69-yard touchdown catch by Steve Smith.

Carolina drove into Philadelphia territory on their opening drive, but punted the ball away. Donovan McNabb marched the Eagles down the field, reaching the Carolina 32-yard line after a 23-yard catch and run by Correll Buckhalter. However, the drive stalled and the Eagles punted. The teams traded punts again, but early in the second quarter Jake Delhomme broke through and led the Panthers down the field, completing a 24-yard touchdown pass to Muhsin Muhammad on a badly thrown ball that somehow beat the Eagles' double coverage. McNabb responded with a long drive, but on 1st and 10 from the Carolina 23-yard line, he was knocked down by his own lineman being pushed back, and was hit by linebacker Greg Favors after he was down. McNabb returned after one play, and had a 10-yard completion to Freddie Mitchell (which was initially ruled a drop). This set up a 41-yard field goal by David Akers that made it 7–3. Philadelphia's final drive of the half was ended when rookie Ricky Manning Jr. picked off McNabb, who was visibly hurt. While the Eagles defense played well, the offense was stifled by four first half sacks.

With McNabb playing with torn cartilage in his ribs, the Eagles went to the ground, using Buckhalter and Duce Staley to drive into Carolina's red zone on their first drive of the third quarter. However, Ricky Manning Jr. stepped in front of a McNabb pass intended for Todd Pinkston and came away with his second interception, which proved to be tremendous blow. On Philadelphia's next possession, receiver James Thrash was hit as the ball arrived and Ricky Manning Jr. grabbed the deflection and returned it 13 yards to the Philadelphia 37-yard line, his third interception. DeShaun Foster helped power the ball to the Eagles' one-yard line, and on first and goal from there, he ran over and through Mark Simoneau, Nate Wayne and Michael Lewis as he pushed into the end zone. Now behind 14–3, Philadelphia's crippled offense was unable to pick up a first down the rest of the quarter. On the first drive of the fourth quarter, Koy Detmer finally came in to replace the ineffective McNabb. Detmer led the Eagles to the Panther 11-yard line, but he was then intercepted by Dan Morgan, ending the Eagles' final threat. Philadelphia got the ball back one final time, and as McNabb watched from the sidelines, could not get past midfield.

For the second year in a row, the Philadelphia fans were forced to watch another team celebrate on their field. The five sacks and four interceptions by Carolina's defense were devastating, while receivers Pinkston and Thrash were manhandled by the Panther secondary throughout the game. The injury to McNabb, on an offense already missing Brian Westbrook, left the offense punchless and made the 14–3 deficit insurmountable. In three quarters of action, McNabb was 10-for-22 for only 100 yards, while Buckhalter and Staley combined for 127 rushing yards. The Panthers rushed for 155 yards on the night. After what looked at times to be a blessed season, the Eagles' playoff campaign ended with an NFC Championship Game defeat, yet again.
