= Nate Wayne =

American football player (born 1975)

No. 54, 51, 53
- Position: Linebacker

Personal information
- Born: January 12, 1975 (age 51); Chicago, Illinois, U.S.
- Listed height: 6 ft 0 in (1.83 m)
- Listed weight: 229 lb (104 kg)

Career information
- High school: Noxubee County (Macon, Mississippi)
- College: Ole Miss
- NFL draft: 1998: 7th round, 219th overall pick

Career history
- Denver Broncos (1998); Barcelona Dragons (1999); Denver Broncos (1999); Green Bay Packers (2000–2002); Philadelphia Eagles (2003–2004); Jacksonville Jaguars (2005)*; Detroit Lions (2005); New Orleans Saints (2006)*
- * Offseason or practice squad member only

Awards and highlights
- Super Bowl champion (XXXIII)

Career NFL statistics
- Total tackles: 452
- Sacks: 16
- Forced fumbles: 9
- Fumble recoveries: 5
- Interceptions: 8
- Stats at Pro Football Reference

Nathaniel Wayne Jr. (born January 12, 1975) is an American former professional football player who was a linebacker in the National Football League (NFL). He played college football for the Ole Miss Rebels. He graduated from the University of Mississippi with a degree in criminal justice. He was known as "Mr. Monday Night", as he consistently performed well on Monday Night Football.

== Professional career ==
Wayne was selected in the seventh round with 219th selection in the 1998 NFL draft. He played one game for the Denver Broncos in 1998, when they won their second straight Super Bowl. He played a slightly larger role on the team in 1999, but was mainly a special teamer. He signed with the Green Bay Packers and play with them as a starter for three years recording 298 tackles, ten sacks, six interceptions, five forced fumbles and five fumble recoveries, and 23 passes defensed.

Wayne signed a four-year deal with the Philadelphia Eagles on March 14, 2003. He started in 2003, but was limited to playing on nickel packages in 2004, due to the promotion of Jeremiah Trotter, and movement of Mark Simoneau to weakside linebacker. Even then he lost playing time to Keith Adams. Wayne was the first Eagle released in the 2005 offseason, and signed with the Lions later that year.

== NFL career statistics ==
Legend
	Won the Super Bowl
**Bold**	Career high

=== Regular season ===
Year	Team	Games		Tackles				Interceptions				Fumbles			
Year	Team	GP	GS	Comb	Solo	Ast	Sck	Int	Yds	TD	Lng	FF	FR	Yds	TD
1998	DEN	1	0	0	0	0	0.0	0	0	0	0	0	0	0	0
1999	DEN	15	0	16	13	3	2.0	0	0	0	0	1	0	0	0
2000	GB	16	13	105	**78**	27	2.0	0	0	0	0	1	1	**9**	0
2001	GB	12	12	86	60	26	**5.5**	**3**	**55**	0	**35**	1	**2**	0	0
2002	GB	16	15	**111**	69	**42**	2.5	**3**	32	0	25	0	**2**	0	0
2003	PHI	16	16	90	69	21	3.0	1	33	0	33	**3**	0	0	0
2004	PHI	9	7	30	23	7	1.0	0	0	0	0	2	0	0	0
2005	DET	5	0	14	11	3	0.0	1	20	0	20	1	0	0	0
Career		90	63	452	323	129	16.0	8	140	0	35	9	5	9	0

=== Playoffs ===
Year	Team	Games		Tackles				Interceptions				Fumbles			
Year	Team	GP	GS	Comb	Solo	Ast	Sck	Int	Yds	TD	Lng	FF	FR	Yds	TD
2001	GB	2	2	12	5	**7**	0.0	0	0	0	0	0	0	0	0
2002	GB	1	1	8	6	2	0.0	0	0	0	0	**1**	0	0	0
2003	PHI	2	2	**16**	**11**	5	0.0	0	0	0	0	0	0	0	0
2004	PHI	3	1	4	2	2	**0.5**	0	0	0	0	0	0	0	0
Career		8	6	40	24	16	0.5	0	0	0	0	1	0	0	0

== Personal life ==
Wayne has a wife, Tamiko, and three children. He also owns a Coldstone Creamery in Atlantic Station in Atlanta, Georgia where he currently resides. He is also a devout Jehovah's Witness.
