= Correll Buckhalter =

American football player (born 1978)

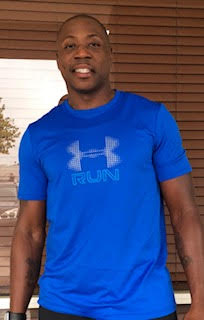
- Buckhalter in 2020

No. 28
- Position: Running back

Personal information
- Born: October 6, 1978 (age 48); Collins, Mississippi, U.S.
- Listed height: 6 ft 0 in (1.83 m)
- Listed weight: 223 lb (101 kg)

Career information
- High school: Collins
- College: Nebraska (1997–2000)
- NFL draft: 2001: 4th round, 121st overall pick

Career history
- Philadelphia Eagles (2001–2008); Denver Broncos (2009–2010)

Awards and highlights
- National champion (1997)

Career NFL statistics
- Rushing yards: 2,944
- Rushing average: 4.5
- Rushing touchdowns: 21
- Receptions: 144
- Receiving yards: 1,410
- Receiving touchdowns: 6
- Stats at Pro Football Reference

Correll Buckhalter (/kəˈrɛl/; born October 6, 1978) is an American former professional football player who was a running back for eight seasons in the National Football League (NFL). After playing college football for the Nebraska Cornhuskers, he was selected by the Philadelphia Eagles in the fourth round of the 2001 NFL draft. He played for the Eagles from 2001 to 2008, with three seasons lost due to injury. He played for the Denver Broncos for two seasons (2009 and 2010).

== Early life ==
Buckhalter attended Collins High School in Collins, Mississippi, and was a letterman in football. In football, he rushed for 3,024 yards over the last two years of his high school years. He was selected for the all-state team, and during his junior year when he rushed for 1,302 yards. During his senior year, he rushed for 1,722 yards and 12 touchdowns. Buckhalter graduated from Collins in 1997.

== College career ==
At the University of Nebraska–Lincoln, Buckhalter played in 46 games and finished ranked eighth in school history for rushing yards (2,522). He had 11 100+ yard games in college while starting only nine times and scored 27 touchdowns for the Cornhuskers. He majored in sociology.

== Professional career ==
Pre-draft measurables
Height	Weight	40-yard dash	10-yard split	20-yard split	20-yard shuttle	Three-cone drill	Vertical jump	Broad jump	Bench press
5 ft 11 5/8 in (1.82 m)	226 lb (103 kg)	4.53 s	1.59 s	2.62 s	4.06 s	7.08 s	40.0 in (1.02 m)	10 ft 3 in (3.12 m)	11 reps
All values from NFL Combine

=== Philadelphia Eagles ===
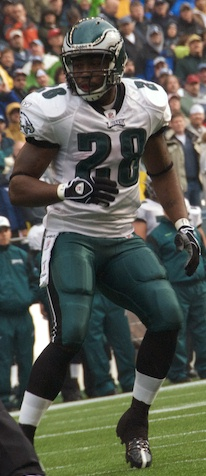
Buckhalter during his tenure with the Philadelphia Eagles.

Buckhalter's NFL career was marred by injuries. He missed the 2002 season due to a torn anterior cruciate ligament in his left knee and both the 2004 and 2005 seasons due to a torn patellar tendon in his right knee.

In his rookie season of 2001, Buckhalter showed flashes of the potential the Eagles saw when he was drafted. Sharing the load with Duce Staley, he rushed for 586 yards with 4.5 yards per carry average, breaking Keith Byars team record for rushing yards by a rookie. He scored two touchdowns that season. Unfortunately, that season he was also suspended for a game after he and two teammates were stopped by police and arrested for possession of marijuana. Buckhalter was not charged in the case.

Buckhalter would not return to the field again until the 2003 season. Teaming with Staley and second year Brian Westbrook, he led the team in rushing attempts and rushing touchdowns (eight) gaining 542 yards in the process. Again however, he was suspended by Coach Andy Reid after missing a team meeting.

While still recovering, Buckhalter and Bryan Scott made cameo appearances in the comedy movie, White Men Can't Rap.

The 2006 season marked his first action since the 2003 NFC Championship Game. He played in all 16 games, but started only once. His season totals included 345 rushing yards on 83 carries, 24 receptions, 256 receiving yards and three touchdowns.

After the season, Buckhalter was re-signed by the Eagles for two years.

In 2007, he saw action at running back as well as at kick returner. He had 313 yards rushing and a 21.6 yards per return average.

=== Denver Broncos ===
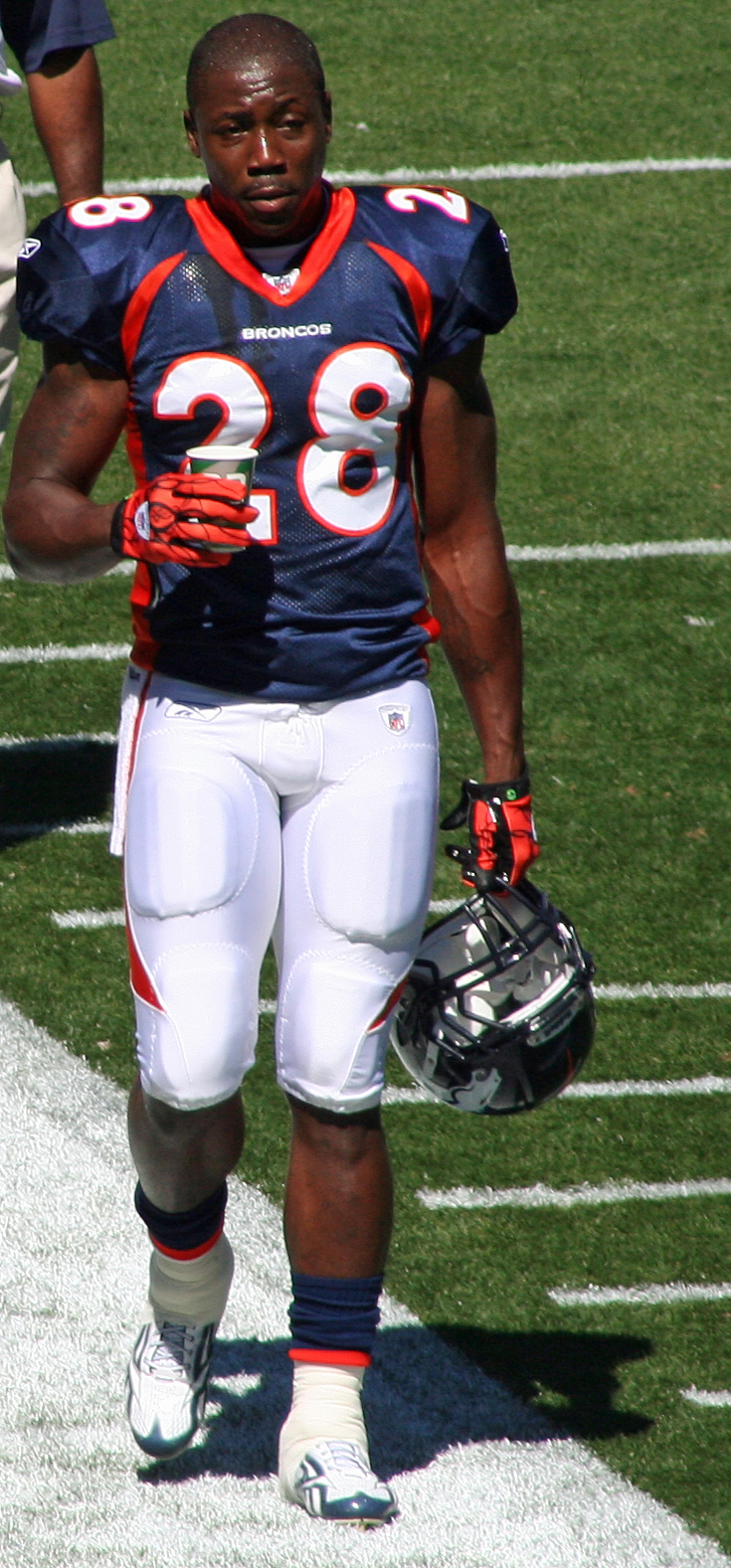
Buckhalter with the Broncos in 2010.

On February 27, 2009, Buckhalter signed a four-year, $10 million contract with the Denver Broncos. The deal included $1.8 million guaranteed. In 2009, his ninth season in the NFL, Buckhalter achieved career highs in rushing yardage (642), yards per carry (5.4), and receptions (31).

In 2010, Buckhalter played in 15 games as a reserve. He rushed for 147 yards and also caught 28 passes for 240 yards. He scored 4 total touchdowns.

On July 28, 2011, he was released by Denver.

== Personal life ==
Buckhalter is a cousin of Tampa Bay Buccaneers cornerback Brandon McDonald. Buckhalter has had to deal with adversity over his career. His mother died when he was young and his brother Chris, who played on the Eagles practice squad in 1996, is serving a 20-year sentence for manslaughter. In March 2009 prosecutors in a Philadelphia drug dealing case named Buckhalter as a celebrity client of the alleged dealer, Styles N. Beckles. Buckhalter has not been charged with any crime and strongly denied any link to Beckles.

Buckhalter owns a Quarter Horse stallion named 'Absolutely No Doubt,' who was the national high point Performance Halter Stallion of the American Quarter Horse Association in 2008.

Buckhalter was charged with one count of conspiracy to commit wire fraud and health care fraud by the United States Department of Justice on December 12, 2019. He initially pleaded not guilty, but later pleaded guilty to the charge by July 2020. He was sentenced to 10 months in prison and 300 days of house arrest in October 2021.

== Career statistics ==
Legend
**Bold**	Career high

=== NFL ===
==== Regular season ====
Year	Team	Games		Rushing					Receiving					Kickoff returns				
Year	Team	GP	GS	Att	Yds	Avg	Lng	TD	Rec	Yds	Avg	Lng	TD	Ret	Yds	Avg	Lng	TD
2001	PHI	15	6	**129**	586	4.5	48	2	13	130	10.0	26	0	1	28	**28.0**	28	0
2002	PHI	0	0	Did not play due to injury														
2003	PHI	15	5	126	542	4.3	**64**	**8**	10	133	**13.3**	27	1	—	—	—	—	—
2004	PHI	0	0	Did not play due to injury														
2005	PHI	0	0	Did not play due to injury														
2006	PHI	16	1	83	345	4.2	20	2	24	256	10.7	55	1	—	—	—	—	—
2007	PHI	14	2	62	313	5.0	30	4	12	87	7.3	14	0	**37**	**798**	21.6	35	0
2008	PHI	14	2	76	369	4.9	33	2	26	**324**	12.5	**59**	**2**	1	14	14.0	14	0
2009	DEN	14	7	120	**642**	**5.4**	45	1	**31**	240	7.7	30	0	8	184	23.0	**41**	0
2010	DEN	15	0	59	147	2.5	13	2	28	240	8.6	23	**2**	—	—	—	—	—
Career		103	23	655	2,944	4.5	64	21	144	1,410	9.8	59	6	47	1,024	21.8	41	0

==== Postseason ====
Year	Team	Games		Rushing					Receiving					Kickoff returns				
Year	Team	GP	GS	Att	Yds	Avg	Lng	TD	Rec	Yds	Avg	Lng	TD	Ret	Yds	Avg	Lng	TD
2001	PHI	3	0	18	**110**	**6.1**	**31**	**1**	**4**	26	6.5	9	0	—	—	—	—	—
2003	PHI	2	0	**20**	60	3.0	9	0	3	**31**	**10.3**	**23**	0	—	—	—	—	—
2006	PHI	2	0	9	15	1.7	9	0	2	11	5.5	8	0	—	—	—	—	—
2008	PHI	3	0	11	55	5.0	27	0	**4**	**31**	7.8	19	0	1	20	20.0	20	0
Career		10	0	58	240	4.1	31	1	13	99	7.6	23	0	1	20	20.0	20	0

=== College ===
Year	Team	Games	Rushing				Receiving			
Year	Team	Games	Att.	Yds	Avg	TD	Rec	Yds	Avg	TD
1997	Nebraska	11	54	311	5.8	6	3	6	2.0	0
1998	Nebraska	12	**142**	**799**	5.6	**8**	**13**	**88**	6.8	0
1999	Nebraska	11	111	662	6.0	6	3	21	7.0	0
2000	Nebraska	11	106	750	**7.1**	7	5	85	**17.0**	**1**
Totals		**45**	**413**	**2,522**	**6.1**	**27**	**24**	**200**	**8.3**	**1**
