= Todd Pinkston =

American football player and coach (born 1977)

No. 87
- Position: Wide receiver

Personal information
- Born: April 23, 1977 (age 49); Forest, Mississippi, U.S.
- Listed height: 6 ft 3 in (1.91 m)
- Listed weight: 180 lb (82 kg)

Career information
- High school: Forest
- College: Southern Miss
- NFL draft: 2000: 2nd round, 36th overall pick

Career history

Playing
- Philadelphia Eagles (2000–2005); Minnesota Vikings (2006)*; Washington Redskins (2007)*
- * Offseason or practice squad member only

Coaching
- Austin Peay (2016–2021) Wide receivers coach; Kansas City Chiefs (2023–2025) Running backs coach

Awards and highlights
- Super Bowl champion (LVIII)

Career NFL statistics
- Receptions: 184
- Receiving yards: 2,816
- Receiving touchdowns: 14
- Stats at Pro Football Reference

Todd Pinkston (born April 23, 1977) is an American football coach and former professional player who was most recently the running backs coach for the Kansas City Chiefs of the National Football League (NFL). He played five seasons professionally as a wide receiver with the Philadelphia Eagles where he caught 184 passes for 2,816 yards and 14 touchdowns. The Eagles went to the playoffs every year that he started, including an appearance in Super Bowl XXXIX. He also is the cousin of former offensive lineman Jason Pinkston. He was inducted to the Southern Miss Sports Hall of Fame in 2011. Todd Pinkston was inducted into the Scott County Sports Hall of Fame in his hometown of Forest, Miss., in 2015.

== Playing career ==
=== College career ===
At the University of Southern Mississippi, where he joined the Theta Eta chapter of Phi Beta Sigma fraternity, he graduated as the school's second all-time leading receiver with 149 catches for 2,366 yards and 22 touchdowns, including 48 receptions for 977 yards and 11 touchdowns as a senior.

=== Professional career ===
==== Philadelphia Eagles ====
Despite his success in college, Pinkston's selection in the second round of the 2000 NFL draft by the Philadelphia Eagles raised some eyebrows due to his slight build. At 6 feet 3 inches tall, Pinkston reportedly weighed only 167 pounds at the time of the draft.

After seeing only slight action in 2000, Pinkston took over as a starter in 2001 following the release of Charles Johnson and Torrance Small. Partnering with James Thrash, Pinkston caught 42 balls for 586 yards and four touchdowns. In 2002, Pinkston enjoyed his best year. He hauled in 60 receptions for 798 yards and seven touchdowns. His performance that season earned him a five-year contract extension with the Eagles, which included a large signing bonus.

Pinkston's numbers dipped slightly in 2003, but he was productive down the stretch and registered a key touchdown in a playoff game against the Green Bay Packers. Unfortunately, the next week, Pinkston was held catchless by Carolina Panthers cornerback, Ricky Manning Jr. Manning snagged three interceptions, and the Eagles lost the 2003 NFC Championship 14–3, the third consecutive defeat suffered by the team in the conference title game.

Criticism of Pinkston turned particularly harsh after a game against the Washington Redskins on December 12, 2004, when Pinkston was accused of giving up on a catchable pass across the middle. ESPN analyst Joe Theismann commented "...this is a great way to lose your job as a receiver in the National Football League." However, later that half Pinkston was the recipient of an 80-yard pass from Donovan McNabb, furthering the paradox between his big play potential and his reluctance to run routes in traffic.

This negative publicity notwithstanding, Pinkston's 18.8 yards-per-catch average for the 2004 regular season was exceeded by only one other NFL receiver with as many or more receptions than the 36 he recorded (Ashley Lelie of the Denver Broncos averaged 20.1), and his six catches gaining 40 or more yards was topped by only three other receivers (teammate Terrell Owens, who had nine, and Javon Walker of the Green Bay Packers and Dennis Northcutt of the Cleveland Browns with seven each).

After having made four receptions for 82 yards in Super Bowl XXXIX, Pinkston was forced to leave the game with leg cramps.

On August 5, 2005, Pinkston sustained a torn Achilles tendon in training camp practice, putting him out for the 2005 season.

During the 2006 pre-season, he was still hobbled from his Achilles injury, only catching one pass for four yards. On August 29, 2006, Pinkston was released by the Eagles following the acquisition of Donté Stallworth.

==== Minnesota Vikings ====
On September 3, 2006, Pinkston signed a one-year contract with the Minnesota Vikings, whose head coach, Brad Childress, was the former Eagles offensive coordinator. Pinkston was cut six days later on September 9.

==== Washington Redskins ====
On August 13, 2007, Pinkston, recovered from his Achilles injury, signed with the Washington Redskins, but failed to make the team's final roster.

==== NFL statistics ====
Regular season
Year	Team	GP	Receiving						Rushing					
Year	Team	GP	Rec	Yds	Avg	Lng	TD	FD	Att	Yds	Avg	Lng	TD	FD
2000	PHI	16	10	181	18.1	45	0	7	—	—	—	—	—	—
2001	PHI	15	42	586	14.0	62	4	23	1	5	5.0	5	0	0
2002	PHI	15	60	798	13.3	42	7	40	1	-15	-15.0	-15	0	0
2003	PHI	16	36	575	16.0	59	2	22	1	-11	-11.0	-11	0	0
2004	PHI	16	36	676	18.8	80	1	24	—	—	—	—	—	—
Career		78	184	2,816	15.3	80	14	116	3	-21	-7.0	5	9	0

Postseason
Year	Team	GP	Receiving					
Year	Team	GP	Rec	Yds	Avg	Lng	TD	FD
2000	PHI	2	1	5	5.0	5	0	1
2001	PHI	3	8	93	11.6	41	1	4
2002	PHI	2	8	99	12.4	24	0	5
2003	PHI	2	7	95	13.6	45	1	5
2004	PHI	3	8	141	17.6	40	0	7
Career		12	32	433	13.5	45	2	22

== Coaching career ==
Pinkston was hired by his former team, the Philadelphia Eagles, as a coaching intern during training camp and the preseason in 2009. He assisted wide receivers coach David Culley in coaching his unit. He also served as the receivers' coach at Petal High School located in Petal, Mississippi, just across the Leaf River from Hattiesburg. He was the wide receiver's coach for Austin Peay State University in Clarksville, Tennessee from 2016 to 2021.

On March 17, 2023, Pinkston was hired as the running backs coach for the Kansas City Chiefs. Pinkston became a Super Bowl champion when the Chiefs defeated the San Francisco 49ers 25–22 in Super Bowl LVIII.

On January 15, 2026, Pinkston was fired by the Chiefs.
