= L. J. Smith =

American football player (born 1980)

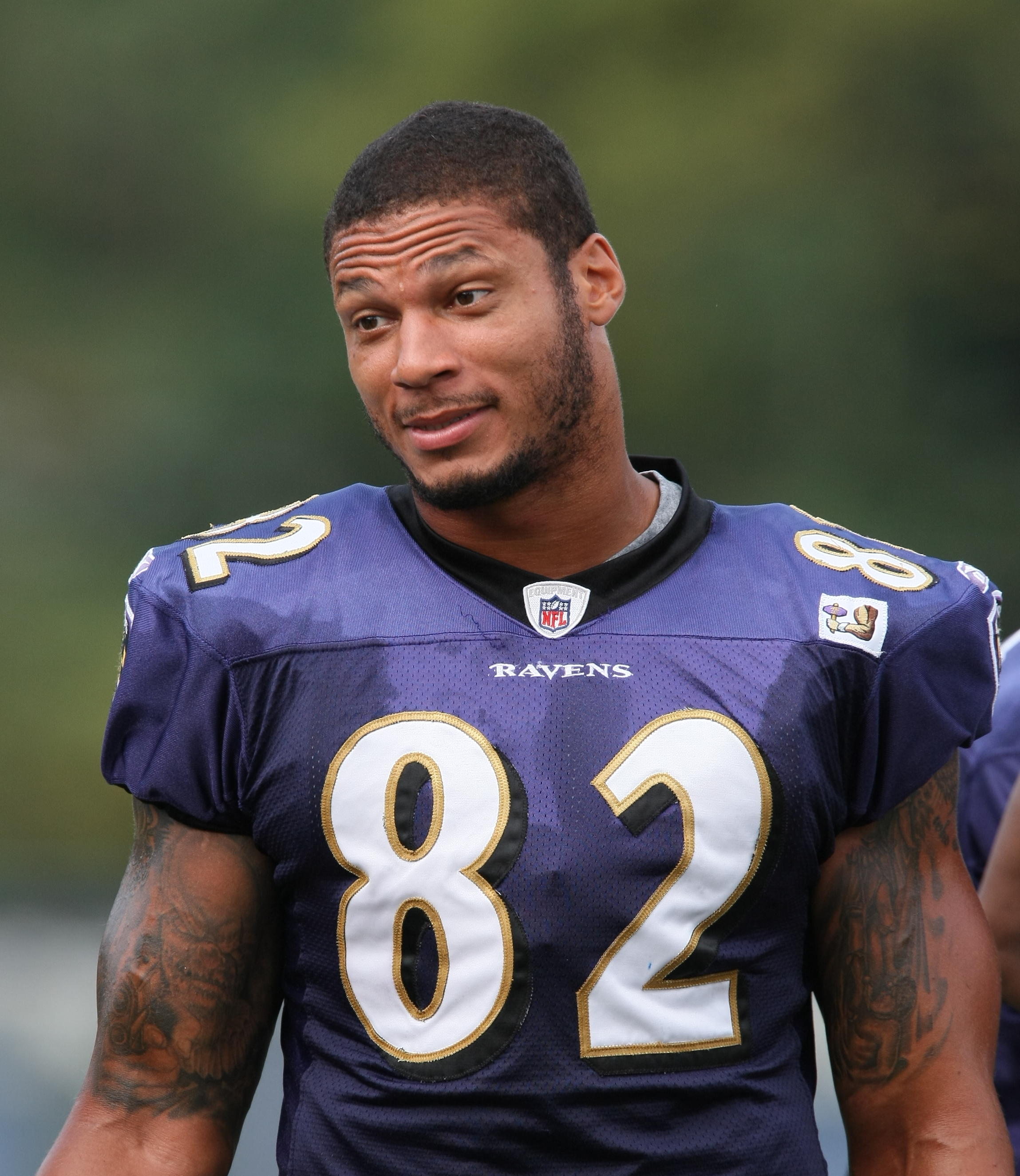
- Smith with the Baltimore Ravens in 2009

No. 82
- Position: Tight end

Personal information
- Born: May 13, 1980 (age 46); Highland Park, New Jersey, U.S.
- Listed height: 6 ft 3 in (1.91 m)
- Listed weight: 258 lb (117 kg)

Career information
- High school: Highland Park
- College: Rutgers
- NFL draft: 2003: 2nd round, 61st overall pick

Career history
- Philadelphia Eagles (2003–2008); Baltimore Ravens (2009)

Career NFL statistics
- Receptions: 233
- Receiving yards: 2,556
- Receiving touchdowns: 18
- Stats at Pro Football Reference

John Smith III (born May 13, 1980), commonly known as L. J., which stands for "Little John", is an American former professional football player who played tight end in the National Football League (NFL). He played college football for the Rutgers Scarlet Knights. He was selected by the Philadelphia Eagles in the second round of the 2003 NFL draft.

== Early life ==
In elementary school, he went to Bartle in Highland Park. At Highland Park High School in Highland Park, New Jersey, Smith played both basketball and football. As a senior football linebacker, he posted 11 sacks, 143 tackles, and five interceptions.

== College career ==
A four-year starter, he finished second in Rutgers history among tight ends with 122 receptions for 1,458 yards and ten touchdowns, surpassed only by Marco Battaglia.

Smith earned All-Big East honors as both a junior and senior, and served as team captain as a senior, leading the Scarlet Knights with a career-high 32 receptions for 384 yards and three touchdowns.

== Professional career ==
Pre-draft measurables
Height	Weight	Arm length	Hand span	40-yard dash	10-yard split	20-yard split	20-yard shuttle	Three-cone drill	Vertical jump	Broad jump	Bench press
6 ft 3 in (1.91 m)	258 lb (117 kg)	32 7/8 in (0.84 m)	10 3/8 in (0.26 m)	4.65 s	1.65 s	2.74 s	4.25 s	6.74 s	37 in (0.94 m)	10 ft 2 in (3.10 m)	26 reps
All values from NFL Combine.

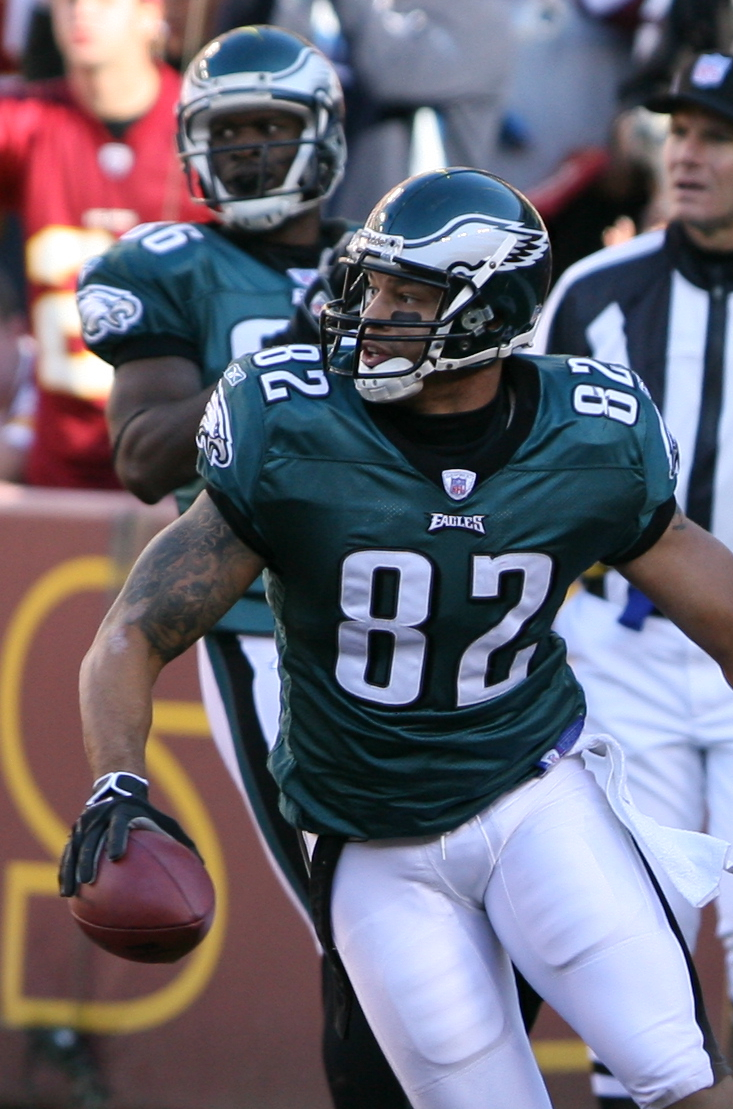
Smith in a 2006 game against the Washington Redskins.

=== Philadelphia Eagles ===
Smith was selected by the Philadelphia Eagles in the second round of the 2003 NFL draft. As a rookie, he backed up Chad Lewis, and had 27 receptions for 321 yards and a touchdown. Coach Andy Reid worked Smith and Lewis both into the offense with two tight-end sets, and Smith had 34 receptions, 377 yards and five touchdowns in 2004. That season, the Eagles reached Super Bowl XXXIX and Smith made an impressive diving reception in the back of the end zone for the Eagles' first touchdown of the game, though they would go on to lose to the New England Patriots 24–21.

With the retirement of Chad Lewis and suspension of Terrell Owens, Smith became one of Donovan McNabb's top targets; between 2005 and 2006, Smith led the Eagles in receptions, receiving yards and receiving touchdowns.

Entering the final year of his contract in 2007, Smith suffered a hernia injury that could have possibly kept him out for the season. Smith however did recover in time for the season opener, though the injury would limit him for much of the year. Unable to reach an agreement on a long-term deal, the Eagles placed the franchise tag on Smith for the 2008 season.

=== Baltimore Ravens ===
Smith signed a one-year, $1.5 million deal with the Baltimore Ravens on March 20, 2009. In his lone season in Baltimore (plagued by injuries) Smith had only two catches for 31 yards, and had no starts backing up Todd Heap.

== NFL career statistics ==
Legend
**Bold**	Career high

=== Regular season ===
Year	Team	Games		Receiving					
Year	Team	GP	GS	Tgt	Rec	Yds	Avg	Lng	TD
2003	PHI	15	5	46	27	321	11.9	36	1
2004	PHI	**16**	8	54	34	377	11.1	31	**5**
2005	PHI	**16**	**16**	**107**	**61**	**682**	11.2	48	3
2006	PHI	**16**	15	75	50	611	12.2	**65**	**5**
2007	PHI	10	9	43	22	236	10.7	26	1
2008	PHI	13	12	64	37	298	8.1	25	3
2009	BAL	12	0	3	2	31	**15.5**	26	0
Total		98	65	392	233	2,556	11.0	65	18

=== Playoffs ===
Year	Team	Games		Receiving					
Year	Team	GP	GS	Tgt	Rec	Yds	Avg	Lng	TD
2003	PHI	2	0	5	3	43	**14.3**	**23**	0
2004	PHI	**3**	**2**	**17**	**9**	**100**	11.1	21	**1**
2006	PHI	2	**2**	5	3	31	10.3	15	0
2008	PHI	2	0	4	3	17	5.7	6	0
2009	BAL	2	0	0	0	0	0.0	0	0
Total		11	4	31	18	191	10.6	23	1

== Personal life ==
Smith was included in the 2005 Chunky Soup commercials featuring Donovan McNabb. He enjoys playing basketball and was a tremendous basketball prospect who drew interest from a number of Division I programs including Florida State and various schools from the Metro Atlantic Athletic Conference. He currently resides in Longport, New Jersey. He currently owns and operates a Plato's Closet store in Edison, New Jersey. Inspired by his mother, Smith returned to Rutgers and in 2016 completed his undergraduate degree.
