= N. D. Kalu =

American football player (born 1975)

N.D. Kalu
No. 53, 72, 94
- Position: Defensive end

Personal information
- Born: August 3, 1975 (age 51); Baltimore, Maryland, U.S.
- Listed height: 6 ft 3 in (1.91 m)
- Listed weight: 265 lb (120 kg)

Career information
- High school: Marshall (San Antonio, Texas)
- College: Rice
- NFL draft: 1997: 5th round, 152nd overall pick

Career history
- Philadelphia Eagles (1997); Washington Redskins (1998–2000); Philadelphia Eagles (2001–2005); Houston Texans (2006–2008)

Awards and highlights
- Second-team All-SWC (1994)

Career NFL statistics
- Tackles: 195
- Sacks: 31
- Forced fumbles: 5
- Fumble recoveries: 4
- Interceptions: 1
- Defensive touchdowns: 1
- Stats at Pro Football Reference

Ndukwe Dike Kalu (born August 3, 1975) is an American former professional football player who was a defensive end in the National Football League (NFL). He played college football for the Rice Owls. He was selected by the Philadelphia Eagles in the fifth round of the 1997 NFL draft.

== Early life ==
Kalu attended Pat Neff Middle School and John Marshall High School in San Antonio, Texas, graduating in 1993. He holds the record in high jump for the Rams at 7 ft 0 in (2.13 m).

== Professional career ==
Kalu was originally selected with the 22nd pick of the fifth round of the 1997 NFL draft out of Rice University by the Philadelphia Eagles. He later played for the Washington Redskins, then returned to the Eagles, then finished his NFL career with the Houston Texans.

== NFL career statistics ==
Legend
**Bold**	Career high

=== Regular season ===
Year	Team	Games		Tackles				Interceptions				Fumbles			
Year	Team	GP	GS	Comb	Solo	Ast	Sck	Int	Yds	TD	Lng	FF	FR	Yds	TD
1997	PHI	3	0	1	0	1	0.0	0	0	0	0	0	0	0	0
1998	WAS	13	1	14	7	7	3.0	0	0	0	0	0	0	0	0
1999	WAS	12	0	14	11	3	3.5	0	0	0	0	1	0	0	0
2000	WAS	15	0	7	4	3	1.0	0	0	0	0	0	1	**4**	0
2001	PHI	14	1	13	12	1	3.0	0	0	0	0	0	0	0	0
2002	PHI	16	0	31	22	**9**	**8.0**	0	0	0	0	**3**	0	0	0
2003	PHI	16	16	**47**	**38**	**9**	5.5	**1**	**15**	**1**	**15**	0	**3**	0	0
2005	PHI	15	8	30	26	4	2.0	0	0	0	0	1	0	0	0
2006	HOU	15	3	21	16	5	2.0	0	0	0	0	0	0	0	0
2007	HOU	15	1	13	8	5	3.0	0	0	0	0	0	0	0	0
2008	HOU	2	0	4	2	2	0.0	0	0	0	0	0	0	0	0
		136	30	195	146	49	31.0	1	15	1	15	5	4	4	0

=== Playoffs ===
Year	Team	Games		Tackles				Interceptions				Fumbles			
Year	Team	GP	GS	Comb	Solo	Ast	Sck	Int	Yds	TD	Lng	FF	FR	Yds	TD
1999	WAS	2	0	1	1	0	**1.0**	0	0	0	0	0	0	0	0
2001	PHI	3	0	2	2	0	0.0	0	0	0	0	0	0	0	0
2002	PHI	2	0	1	1	0	0.0	0	0	0	0	**1**	0	0	0
2003	PHI	2	2	**6**	**3**	**3**	0.0	0	0	0	0	0	0	0	0
		9	2	10	7	3	1.0	0	0	0	0	1	0	0	0

== Personal life ==
Kalu is of Nigerian descent. He is currently working at sports radio station KBME in Houston, hosting a Houston sports show called ""In The Trenches". He also serves as an occasional analyst for CSN Houston, American Sports Network, and ESPN3.
