= Duce Staley =

American football player and coach (born 1975)

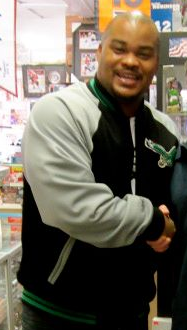
- Staley in 2013

Cleveland Browns
- Title: Running backs coach

Personal information
- Born: February 27, 1975 (age 51); West Columbia, South Carolina, U.S.
- Listed height: 5 ft 11 in (1.80 m)
- Listed weight: 242 lb (110 kg)

Career information
- Position: Running back (No. 22)
- High school: Airport (West Columbia)
- College: South Carolina
- NFL draft: 1997: 3rd round, 71st overall pick

Career history

Playing
- Philadelphia Eagles (1997–2003); Pittsburgh Steelers (2004–2006)

Coaching
- Philadelphia Eagles (2011–2020) Special teams quality control coach (2011–2012) Running backs coach (2013–2020) Assistant head coach (2018–2020); Detroit Lions (2021–2022) Assistant head coach & running backs coach; Carolina Panthers (2023) Assistant head coach & running backs coach; Cleveland Browns (2024–present) Running backs coach

Awards and highlights
- As player: Super Bowl champion (XL); First-team All-SEC (1996); As coach: Super Bowl champion (LII)

Career NFL statistics
- Rushing yards: 5,785
- Rushing average: 4
- Rushing touchdowns: 24
- Receptions: 287
- Receiving yards: 2,587
- Receiving touchdowns: 10
- Stats at Pro Football Reference

Duce Staley (born February 27, 1975) is an American football coach and former player who is the running backs coach for the Cleveland Browns of the National Football League (NFL). He previously served in the same capacity with the Detroit Lions during the 2021 and 2022 NFL seasons, and with the Philadelphia Eagles in various assistant coaching roles from 2011 to 2020.

Staley played college football as a running back for the South Carolina Gamecocks and was selected by the Eagles in the third round of the 1997 NFL draft, and during his playing career was best known for his tenure with the Eagles. Subsequently, he was a player with the Pittsburgh Steelers when they won Super Bowl XL against the Seattle Seahawks. Following the end of his playing career, Staley began his coaching career as a special teams quality control coach in 2011. He was promoted to the running backs coach in 2013 and given an additional role as assistant head coach in 2018. Staley was a coach with the Eagles when they won Super Bowl LII against the New England Patriots.

== Early life ==
Staley attended Airport High School in West Columbia, South Carolina and was an All-State wide receiver, and played running back sparingly.

== Playing career ==
=== College ===
As a senior at the University of South Carolina in 1996, Staley was ranked 13th in the nation in rushing with 1,116 rushing yards. In his collegiate career at South Carolina, Staley attempted 345 rushes for 1,852 yards (5.4 yards per carry). He also caught 59 passes for 489 yards and two touchdowns.

=== National Football League ===
Pre-draft measurables
Height	Weight	Arm length	Hand span
5 ft 11 1/8 in (1.81 m)	220 lb (100 kg)	31 in (0.79 m)	8 7/8 in (0.23 m)
All values from NFL Combine

==== Philadelphia Eagles ====
Staley was selected by the Philadelphia Eagles in the 1997 NFL draft and played for the Eagles through the 2003 season. After his rookie season and the departure of Ricky Watters, Staley became the starter in a tumultuous 3–13 season which led to the dismissal of head coach Ray Rhodes. Under Andy Reid, Staley developed into the team's perennial leading receiver through Reid's screen-heavy West Coast offense. However, he played in only five games of the 2000 season due to a serious Lisfranc fracture. Staley also missed some playing time in 2001 due to a shoulder injury. Entering the 2003 season, Staley held out of training camp in an attempt to bargain for a new contract, as he was in the last year of his deal. With Correll Buckhalter coming back from a torn anterior cruciate ligament (ACL) and Brian Westbrook entering his second season, the Eagles decided not to budge. This resulted in shared playing time among the three, as Westbrook became the premier back by season's end. They were known as the "Three-Headed Monster". Consequently, the Eagles decided to not re-sign Staley.

==== Pittsburgh Steelers ====
Staley signed a five-year, $14 million contract with the Pittsburgh Steelers on March 9, 2004. Staley had rooted for the Steelers when he was growing up. He instantly became the number one running back for his new team, and was seen as the eventual heir apparent for Jerome Bettis, who at the time had the sixth-most career rushing yards in NFL history.

Staley played in 10 games in 2004, and rushed for 830 yards. He only scored one touchdown however, as Bettis took most goal-line carries, and eventually took over the starting job since Staley missed six games.

In 2005, after both he and Bettis were injured, Willie Parker, an undrafted free agent, had a stellar season, and Staley, in another injury plagued season, was dropped to third-string, managing only 148 yards in five games, with a 3.9 yard per carry average. The Steelers went on to win Super Bowl XL, giving Staley his first ever championship.

Staley played just one snap in the Steelers' 2006 season-opening win against the Dolphins. The Steelers signed former Packers' running back Najeh Davenport the next day, and deactivated Staley for the rest of the season. On December 3, 2006, the Steelers released Staley. In his three-year tenure with the team, Staley played in just 16 games.

==== Retirement ====
Staley officially retired as an Eagle during the Eagles-Giants game on December 9, 2007. At halftime, Staley was escorted onto the field by former teammates for his retirement celebration featuring a brief ceremony and two highlight videos.

=== NFL statistics ===
Year	Team	Games		Rushing					Receiving			
Year	Team	GP	GS	Att	Yds	Avg	TD	Fumbles	Rec	Yds	Avg	TD
1997	PHI	16	0	7	29	4.1	0	0	2	22	11.0	0
1998	PHI	16	13	258	1,065	4.1	5	2	57	432	7.6	1
1999	PHI	16	16	325	1,273	3.9	4	5	41	294	7.2	2
2000	PHI	5	5	79	344	4.4	1	3	25	201	8.0	0
2001	PHI	13	10	166	604	3.6	2	3	63	626	9.9	2
2002	PHI	16	16	269	1,029	3.8	5	3	51	541	10.6	3
2003	PHI	16	4	96	463	4.8	5	2	36	382	10.6	2
2004	PIT	10	10	192	830	4.3	1	3	6	55	9.2	0
2005	PIT	5	1	38	148	3.9	1	1	6	34	5.7	0
2006	PIT	1	0	0	0	0	0.0	0	0	0	0.0	0
Career		114	75	1,430	5,785	4.1	24	22	287	2,587	8.9	10

== Coaching career ==
=== Philadelphia Eagles ===
Staley became a coaching intern for the Philadelphia Eagles during the 2010 offseason. On February 8, 2011, Staley was promoted to special teams quality control coach. After the departure of Andy Reid, Staley remained on the new staff with Chip Kelly and was promoted to the team's running backs coach. Kelly was fired as the team's head coach in December 2015 and Staley was interviewed for the vacant head coaching job in January 2016. Staley was retained as the team's running backs coach by new head coach Doug Pederson on January 20, 2016. On February 4, 2018, Staley won his first Super Bowl as a coach, and second overall, as the Eagles defeated the Patriots, 41–33, in Super Bowl LII. On February 20, 2018, Staley was promoted to assistant head coach while maintaining his running backs coach position.

On August 2, 2020, Eagles head coach Doug Pederson was diagnosed with COVID-19 during training camp. He planned to communicate with the team virtually during his quarantine, and he relinquished day-to-day head coaching duties to Staley in the interim. Pederson returned to the team on August 12.

The "Duce Staley drill", a practice drill that Staley created to enhance players' footwork, was added to the NFL Scouting Combine in 2020.

=== Detroit Lions ===
On January 25, 2021, Staley was hired by the Detroit Lions as their assistant head coach and running backs coach under head coach Dan Campbell.

=== Carolina Panthers ===
On February 1, 2023, Staley joined new head coach Frank Reich and the Carolina Panthers as the running backs coach and assistant head coach. On November 27, Staley was fired along with quarterbacks coach Josh McCown and head coach Frank Reich.

=== Cleveland Browns ===
On February 5, 2024, Staley officially joined the Cleveland Browns as their new running backs coach.

== Personal life ==
Staley is married to Maria Steadman, with three daughters and four sons. He is a native of Columbia, South Carolina, which is where he resides during the offseason. He underwent an innovative rehabilitation period prior to the 2001 season to become the first skill position NFL player known to return from a Lisfranc injury. He annually holds The Duce Staley Football Camp at West Chester University in Chester County, Pennsylvania, which benefits several charities, including First Steps Program in South Carolina, the Variety Club, and Direct Care for Kids. He launched the Catch 22 Foundation to help single mothers. He donated $25,000 to South Carolina Governor Jim Hodges First Steps early childhood education program in 1999 to help improve education in the state.

His son, Damani, played linebacker for the South Carolina Gamecocks from 2018 to 2021.
