= Ron Johnson (defensive end) =

American football player (born 1979)

No. 62
- Position: Defensive end

Personal information
- Born: October 23, 1979 (age 47); York, Pennsylvania, U.S.
- Listed height: 6 ft 5 in (1.96 m)
- Listed weight: 260 lb (118 kg)

Career information
- High school: York (PA) Catholic
- College: Shippensburg
- NFL draft: 2003: undrafted

Career history
- Philadelphia Eagles (2003)
- Stats at Pro Football Reference

Ron Johnson (born October 23, 1979) was a three-time All-PSAC Western Division selection at Shippensburg University from 1999 to 2002. He finished his career with 158 total tackles, including 35 for loss and 18 sacks while earning All-PSAC Western Division First Team honors as a senior in 2002.

He was also named All-PSAC Western Division Second Team in 1999 and 2000.

== Biography ==
Johnson attended York Catholic High School. He graduated from Shippensburg with a bachelor's in speech communications.

Johnson's 18.0 career sacks still rank fifth in school history. He spent part of one season with the Philadelphia Eagles, appearing in three games. Johnson suffered a spinal injury in his second season with the Eagles and was released, officially retiring from the NFL in 2005 due to the severity of his spinal injury. In late-2006, he signed with the Arena Football League's Philadelphia Soul.

In September 2005, Johnson was the first overall draft pick in the NFL Europe Free Agent Draft by the Hamburg Sea Devils but did not play in NFLE.

Johnson has been the defensive line coach at Red Lion Area Senior High School in Red Lion, Pennsylvania since 2012. Two years prior, in 2010, he set up the Rising Stars Football Academy, a non-contact football camp for football players who play at the High School Varsity/JV, Freshman, Junior High, and Midget football levels.
