= Jeremy Bridges =

American football player (born 1980)

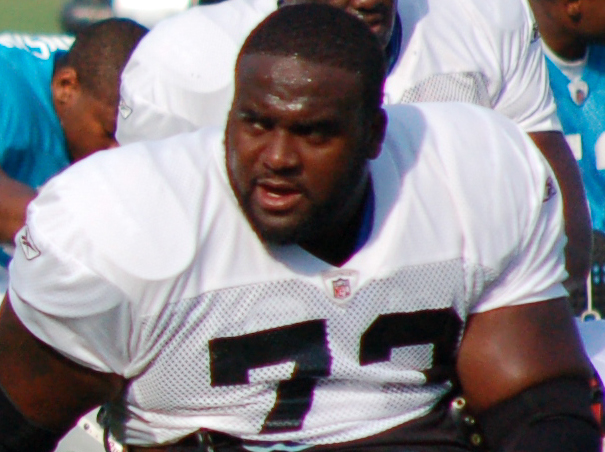
- Bridges with the Carolina Panthers in 2008

No. 73, 72
- Position: Guard

Personal information
- Born: April 19, 1980 (age 46); Fort Wayne, Indiana, U.S.
- Listed height: 6 ft 5 in (1.96 m)
- Listed weight: 318 lb (144 kg)

Career information
- High school: South Pike (Magnolia, Mississippi)
- College: Southern Mississippi
- NFL draft: 2003: 6th round, 185th overall pick

Career history
- Philadelphia Eagles (2003); Arizona Cardinals (2004–2005); Carolina Panthers (2006–2008); Washington Redskins (2009)*; Arizona Cardinals (2009–2012); Carolina Panthers (2012)
- * Offseason or practice squad member only

Awards and highlights
- Conference USA All-Freshman (1999); Second-team All-Conference USA (2001)

Career NFL statistics
- Games played: 112
- Games started: 55
- Fumble recoveries: 2
- Stats at Pro Football Reference

Jeremy Eugene Bridges (born April 19, 1980) is an American former professional football player who was a guard in the National Football League (NFL). He was selected by the Philadelphia Eagles in the sixth round of the 2003 NFL draft. He played college football for the Southern Miss Golden Eagles. Bridges was also a member of the Arizona Cardinals, Carolina Panthers and Washington Redskins.

== Early life ==
Bridges graduated in 1998 from South Pike High School in Magnolia, Mississippi, where he played football and was the Pike County, Mississippi Player of the Year as a senior.

== College career ==
Bridges played college football at Southern Mississippi and graduated with a degree in sports administration.

== Professional career ==
Pre-draft measurables
Height	Weight	Arm length	Hand span	40-yard dash	10-yard split	20-yard split	20-yard shuttle	Three-cone drill	Vertical jump	Broad jump	Bench press
6 ft 4 1/8 in (1.93 m)	301 lb (137 kg)	34 in (0.86 m)	9 1/2 in (0.24 m)	5.42 s	1.82 s	3.10 s	4.77 s	8.12 s	28.5 in (0.72 m)	8 ft 0 in (2.44 m)	25 reps
All values from NFL Combine

=== Philadelphia Eagles ===
Bridges was selected by the Philadelphia Eagles in the sixth round (185th overall) in the 2003 NFL draft, but was inactive for the entire season.

=== Arizona Cardinals (first stint) ===
Bridges was claimed off waivers by the Arizona Cardinals on September 6, 2004, and made his first ever NFL start on October 10 at the San Francisco 49ers. He spent two seasons with the Cardinals.

=== Carolina Panthers (first stint) ===
Bridges was signed by the Carolina Panthers as a free agent and started in the final 14 games of the 2006 season. He was released by the Panthers on February 25, 2009.

=== Washington Redskins ===
Bridges was signed by the Washington Redskins as a free agent on May 3, 2009. He was released during final cuts on September 5.

=== Arizona Cardinals (second stint) ===
Bridges re-signed with the Cardinals on September 8, 2009. He played in all 48 regular-season games from 2009 to 2011, starting 16. He injured his thumb in the 2012 preseason, and was placed on injured reserve. He was waived in November after reaching an injury settlement.

=== Carolina Panthers (second stint) ===
Bridges was signed mid-season by the Panthers on November 14, 2012, "as a stop-gap for their struggling offensive line." He was released three weeks later.

== Personal life ==
Bridges was arrested prior to the start of training camp for the 2007 season and charged with misdemeanor assault for allegedly pointing a gun at a woman in a strip club parking lot in Charlotte, North Carolina. After a trial in November 2007, he was found guilty and given a 60-day suspended sentence and one year unsupervised probation; he was also ordered to pay a $500 fine and do 60 hours of community service. The Panthers suspended him for two games for the incident.

On Sunday, December 7, 2008, Bridges was arrested in Ballantyne, Charlotte, North Carolina and charged with simple assault and battery and communicating threats. The arrest stemmed from a confrontation at a local restaurant. The incident started when Bridges ordered a bottle of Dom Pérignon (wine) from the restaurant bar Saturday night and shook it up, causing the champagne to spew and get other patrons wet. The restaurant manager alleges that Bridges then got into a verbal confrontation with another patron and then a physical confrontation with the bouncer, at which time the police were called. Bridges admits that he shook and opened the champagne bottle, but denies any physical confrontation. He was released on $2,500 bond. He was inactive for the Panthers' game on December 8, 2008, but it is unclear if he will face any more punishment from either the Panthers or the NFL.
