= Cornell–Dartmouth football rivalry =

American college football rivalry

- Cornell Big Red Dartmouth Big Green
- Sport: Football
- First meeting: October 27, 1900; Cornell, 23–6
- Latest meeting: November 14, 2026; Dartmouth, 24–14
- Next meeting: November 13, 2027

Statistics
- Total meetings: 109
- All-time series: Dartmouth leads, 64–44–1
- Largest victory: Cornell, 59–7 (1921)
- Longest win streak: Dartmouth, 11 (1968–1978)
- Current win streak: Cornell, 1 (2026–present)

Locations of Cornell and Dartmouth

The Cornell–Dartmouth football rivalry is an American college football rivalry between the Cornell Big Red and Dartmouth Big Green. The two schools were both major football powers before the split between the NCAA Division I Football Bowl Subdivision (FBS) and Football Championship Subdivision (FCS). Prior to the split, Cornell captured national championships in 1915, 1921, 1922, 1923, and 1939. Dartmouth won its lone national championship in 1925. One of the most infamous games in the rivalry contained national title implications. The 1940 game, referred to as the Fifth Down Game, ended Cornell's 16-game unbeaten streak, as it sought a second consecutive national championship. After emerging with a 7–3 win, the Big Red voluntarily forfeited to Dartmouth when review of film showed the Cornell had inadvertently used five downs. The ESPN College Football Encyclopedia named the game, and Cornell's honorable concession, the second greatest moment in college football history.

The rivalry series was the second-longest uninterrupted series in the Football Championship Subdivision with 101 consecutive meetings since 1919, as of the 2019 contest. This record trails only the series between Lehigh and Lafayette, which has met 130 consecutive times as of 2019. Since the advent of the Ivy League in 1954, Dartmouth and Cornell have continued their annual series, which has featured several long winning streaks from the Big Green. The most recent, a ten game streak from 2009 to 2018, was snapped by a 20–17 Cornell victory that denied Dartmouth a chance at an outright league title. Ranked #12, Dartmouth was the highest ranked opponent that Cornell had defeated since a 23–14 victory over Ohio State during the Big Red's 1939 national championship season. In aggregate, Dartmouth has won a league-record 22 Ivy championships, while Cornell has claimed three championships in league competition.

== Game results ==
Cornell victories	Dartmouth victories	Tie games

No.	Date	Location	Winner	Score
1	October 27, 1900	Ithaca, NY	Cornell	23–6
2	November 9, 1912	Ithaca, NY	Dartmouth	24–0
3	October 25, 1919	New York NY	Dartmouth	9–0
4	November 6, 1920	New York, NY	Dartmouth	14–3
5	October 29, 1921	Ithaca, NY	Cornell	59–7
6	November 11, 1922	New York, NY	Cornell	23–0
7	November 3, 1923	Hanover, NH	Cornell	32–7
8	November 15, 1924	New York, NY	Dartmouth	27–14
9	November 7, 1925	Hanover, NY	Dartmouth	62–13
10	November 13, 1926	Ithaca, NY	Cornell	24–23
11	November 12, 1927	Hanover, NH	Dartmouth	53–7
12	November 17, 1928	Ithaca, NY	Dartmouth	28–0
13	November 16, 1929	Hanover, NH	Dartmouth	18–14
14	November 15, 1930	Ithaca, NY	Dartmouth	19–13
15	November 14, 1931	Hanover, NH	Dartmouth	14–0
16	November 12, 1932	Ithaca, NY	Cornell	21–6
17	November 18, 1933	Hanover, NH	Cornell	7–0
18	November 17, 1934	Ithaca, NY	Cornell	21–6
19	November 16, 1935	Hanover, NH	Dartmouth	41–6
20	November 14, 1936	Ithaca, NY	Dartmouth	20–6
21	November 13, 1937	Hanover, NH	Tie	6–6
22	November 12, 1938	Ithaca, NY	Cornell	14–7
23	November 18, 1939	Hanover, NH	Cornell	35–6
24	November 16, 1940	Hanover, NH	Dartmouth	3–0
25	November 15, 1941	Ithaca, NY	Cornell	33–19
26	November 14, 1942	New York, NY	Cornell	21–19
27	November 13, 1943	Boston, MA	Dartmouth	20–0
28	November 18, 1944	Ithaca, NY	Cornell	14–13
29	November 17, 1945	Hanover, NH	Cornell	20–13
30	November 16, 1946	Ithaca, NY	Cornell	21–7
31	November 15, 1947	Hanover, NH	Dartmouth	21–13
32	November 13, 1948	Ithaca, NY	Cornell	27–26
33	November 12, 1949	Hanover, NH	Dartmouth	16–7
34	November 18, 1950	Ithaca, NY	Cornell	24–0
35	November 17, 1951	Hanover, NH	Cornell	21–13
36	November 15, 1952	Ithaca, NY	Cornell	13–7
37	November 14, 1953	Hanover, NH	Cornell	28–26
38	November 13, 1954	Ithaca, NY	Cornell	40–21
39	November 12, 1955	Hanover, NH	Dartmouth	7–0
40	November 17, 1956	Ithaca, NY	Dartmouth	27–14
41	November 16, 1957	Hanover, NH	Dartmouth	20–19
42	November 15, 1958	Ithaca, NY	Dartmouth	32–15
43	November 14, 1959	Hanover, NH	Dartmouth	21–12
44	November 12, 1960	Ithaca, NY	Dartmouth	20–0
45	November 18, 1961	Hanover, NH	Dartmouth	15–14
46	November 17, 1962	Ithaca, NY	Dartmouth	28–21
47	November 16, 1963	Hanover, NH	Dartmouth	12–7
48	November 14, 1964	Ithaca, NY	Cornell	33–15
49	November 13, 1965	Hanover, NH	Dartmouth	20–0
50	November 12, 1966	Ithaca, NY	Dartmouth	32–23
51	November 18, 1967	Hanover, NH	Cornell	24–21
52	November 16, 1968	Ithaca, NY	Dartmouth	27–6
53	November 15, 1969	Hanover, NH	Dartmouth	24–7
54	November 14, 1970	Ithaca, NY	Dartmouth	24–0
55	November 13, 1971	Hanover, NH	Dartmouth	24–14
56	November 18, 1972	Ithaca, NY	Dartmouth	31–22

No.	Date	Location	Winner	Score
57	November 17, 1973	Hanover, NH	Dartmouth	17–0
58	November 16, 1974	Ithaca, NY	Dartmouth	21–9
59	November 15, 1975	Hanover, NH	Dartmouth	33–10
60	October 23, 1976	Ithaca, NY	Dartmouth	35–0
61	October 22, 1977	Hanover, NH	Dartmouth	17–13
62	October 28, 1978	Ithaca, NY	Dartmouth	14–7
63	October 27, 1979	Hanover, NH	Cornell	21–10
64	October 25, 1980	Ithaca, NY	Cornell	7–3
65	October 24, 1981	Hanover, NH	Dartmouth	42–7
66	October 23, 1982	Ithaca, NY	Dartmouth	14–13
67	October 22, 1983	Hanover, NH	Dartmouth	31–17
68	October 27, 1984	Ithaca, NY	Cornell	13–10
69	October 26, 1985	Ithaca, NY	Dartmouth	20–17
70	October 25, 1986	Hanover, NH	Cornell	10–7
71	October 24, 1987	Ithaca, NY	Cornell	21–14
72	October 22, 1988	Hanover, NH	Cornell	24–7
73	October 28, 1989	Ithaca, NY	Dartmouth	28–14
74	October 20, 1990	Ithaca, NY	Dartmouth	11–6
75	October 26, 1991	Hanover, NH	Dartmouth	34–21
76	October 24, 1992	Ithaca, NY	Cornell	26–16
77	October 23, 1993	Hanover, NH	Dartmouth	28–27
78	October 22, 1994	Ithaca, NY	Cornell	17–14
79	September 30, 1995	Hanover, NH	Cornell	25–19
80	October 26, 1996	Ithaca, NY	Dartmouth	38–21
81	October 4, 1997	Hanover, NH	Dartmouth	24–20
82	October 24, 1998	Ithaca, NY	Cornell	14–11
83	October 23, 1999	Hanover, NH	Dartmouth	20–17
84	November 4, 2000	Ithaca, NY	Cornell	49–31
85	November 3, 2001	Hanover, NH	Cornell	28–24
86	November 9, 2002	Ithaca, NY	Cornell	21–19
87	November 8, 2003	Hanover, NH	Dartmouth	26–17
88	November 6, 2004	Ithaca, NY	Cornell	14–7
89	November 5, 2005	Hanover, NH	Cornell	21–10
90	November 4, 2006	Ithaca, NY	Cornell	28–25
91	November 3, 2007	Hanover, NH	Dartmouth	59–31
92	November 8, 2008	Ithaca, NY	Cornell	37–14
93	November 7, 2009	Hanover, NH	Dartmouth	20–17
94	November 6, 2010	Ithaca, NY	Dartmouth	28–10
95	November 5, 2011	Hanover, NH	Dartmouth	33–24
96	November 3, 2012	Ithaca, NY	Dartmouth	44–28
97	November 9, 2013	Hanover, NH	Dartmouth	34–6
98	November 8, 2014	Ithaca, NY	Dartmouth	42–7
99	November 6, 2015	Hanover, NH	Dartmouth	21–3
100	November 5, 2016	Ithaca, NY	Dartmouth	17–13
101	November 4, 2017	Hanover, NH	Dartmouth	10–0
102	November 10, 2018	Ithaca, NY	Dartmouth	35–24
103	November 16, 2019	Hanover, NH	Cornell	20–17
104	November 13, 2021	Hanover, NH	Dartmouth	41–7
105	November 12, 2022	Ithaca, NY	Cornell	17–13
106	November 11, 2023	Hanover, NH	Dartmouth	30–14
107	November 16, 2024	Ithaca, NY	Cornell	39–22
108	November 15, 2025	Hanover, NH	Dartmouth	24–14
109	November 14, 2026	Ithaca, NY	Cornell	20–14
Series: Dartmouth leads 64–44–1

== See also ==
- List of NCAA college football rivalry games
- List of most-played college football series in NCAA Division I
- Fifth Down Game (1940)
