= Andy Reid =

American football coach (born 1958)

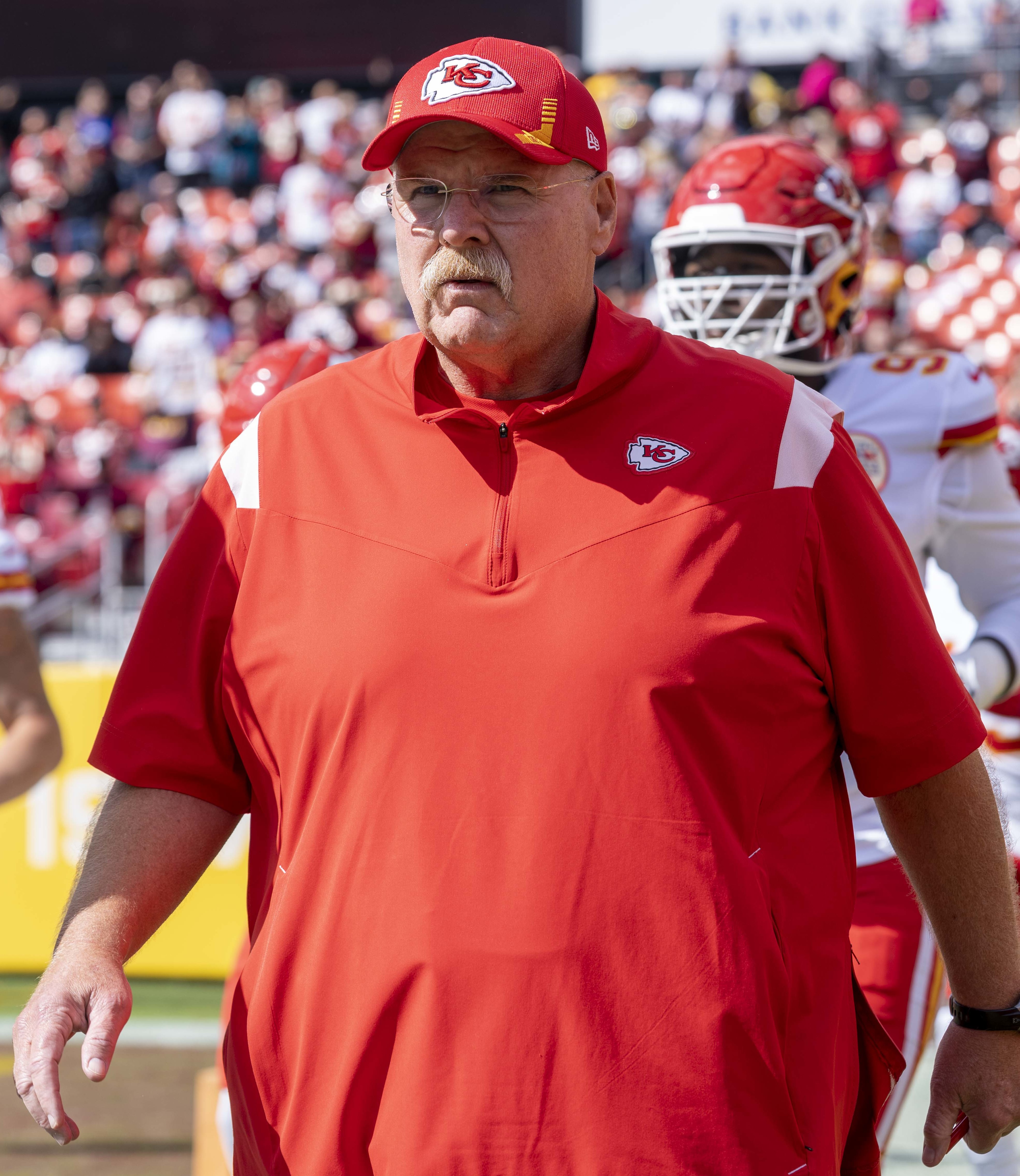
- Reid with the Kansas City Chiefs in 2021

Kansas City Chiefs
- Title: Head coach

Personal information
- Born: March 19, 1958 (age 68); Los Angeles, California, U.S.

Career information
- Position: Offensive tackle
- High school: John Marshall (Los Angeles)
- College: Glendale (CA) (1976–1977); BYU (1978–1980)

Career history

Coaching
- BYU (1982) Graduate assistant; San Francisco State (1983–1985) Offensive line coach; Northern Arizona (1986) Offensive line coach; UTEP (1987–1988) Offensive line coach; Missouri (1989–1991) Offensive line coach; Green Bay Packers (1992–1998); Assistant offensive line & tight ends coach (1992–1996); Quarterbacks coach & assistant head coach (1997–1998); Philadelphia Eagles (1999–2012) Head coach; Kansas City Chiefs (2013–present) Head coach

Operations
- Philadelphia Eagles (2001–2012) Executive Vice President of Football Operations

Awards and highlights
- As a head coach: 3× Super Bowl champion (LIV, LVII, LVIII); AP NFL Coach of the Year (2002); 3× Sporting News Coach of the Year (2000, 2002, 2018); Pro Football Weekly Coach of the Year (2002); 4× Greasy Neale Award (2000, 2002, 2010, 2018); Philadelphia Eagles 75th Anniversary Team; As an assistant coach: Super Bowl champion (XXXI)

Head coaching record
- Regular season: 286–159–1 (.642)
- Postseason: 28–17 (.622)
- Career: 314–176–1 (.641)
- Coaching profile at Pro Football Reference
- Executive profile at Pro Football Reference

Andrew Walter Reid (born March 19, 1958) is an American professional football coach who is the head coach for the Kansas City Chiefs of the National Football League (NFL). He was previously the head coach of the Philadelphia Eagles from 1999 to 2012. From 2001 to 2012, Reid was also the Eagles' executive vice president of football operations. He is the longest-tenured coach in the league, and the only NFL coach to win 100 games with two different franchises and also the only coach to appear in four consecutive conference championships with two different franchises. Reid is considered one of the greatest NFL coaches of all time.

Reid began his professional coaching career with the Green Bay Packers, serving as an offensive assistant from 1992 to 1998 and was a member of the team that won Super Bowl XXXI. He held his first head coaching position with the Eagles in 1999, who became perennial postseason contenders under his leadership. Reid led the Eagles to nine playoff runs, six division titles, five NFC Championship Games (including four consecutive from 2001 to 2004), and an appearance in Super Bowl XXXIX. He was fired following the 2012 season, as the Eagles had missed the postseason for a second straight year.

Hired as the head coach of the Chiefs in 2013, Reid helped revitalize the struggling franchise into the league's best. In 13 seasons with Kansas City, Reid has led the Chiefs to 11 postseason appearances, nine consecutive division titles, seven consecutive AFC Championship Games, five Super Bowl appearances (including three consecutive), and three Super Bowl titles. This included their first playoff victory since 1993 in the 2015 season, their first consecutive division titles in franchise history, and their first Super Bowl title in 50 years in Super Bowl LIV.

== Early life ==
Reid was born in Los Angeles on March 19, 1958. He attended John Marshall High School and worked as a vendor at Dodger Stadium as a teenager. Reid first grew his mustache while sailing as a cadet aboard the TS Golden Bear during his time at the California Maritime Academy. Reid played youth sports in East Hollywood, at Lemon Grove Recreation Center, where Pete Arbogast, the radio announcer for the USC football team and play-by-play announcer for the Cincinnati Bengals, was one of his coaches.

In 1971, at age 13, Reid was on Monday Night Football participating in the Punt, Pass, and Kick competition; he was already so large that he wore the jersey of Les Josephson, who was 6 feet 1 inch (1.85 m) and 207 pounds (94 kg).

== Playing career ==
In high school, Reid played football for coach Hiroshi Tanaka while at Marshall and was named a scholar athlete, MVP, all-league, all-city and All-American. Reid was also named all-league in baseball as a pitcher.

Reid played offensive tackle at Glendale Community College in Glendale, California, and planned to transfer to Stanford but injured his knee. While at Glendale, Reid was named all-conference and most inspirational player. BYU head coach LaVell Edwards wanted Reid's teammate and best friend Randy Tidwell, and also recruited Reid to the team to help persuade Tidwell to come to BYU. At BYU, Reid was a teammate of Jim McMahon and Tom Holmoe.

Teammates recalled that Reid did not play often but was very analytical, closely studying Edwards and offensive coordinator Doug Scovil. BYU won the 1980 Holiday Bowl in his senior year.

== Coaching career ==
=== Early jobs ===
Reid had thought of becoming a writer, but continued to question Edwards about football strategy, causing Edwards to suggest coaching as a career. After graduating from BYU in 1981, Reid spent one year as a graduate assistant on the school's football coaching staff; colleagues included Scovil, Norm Chow, and Mike Holmgren. He spent the next nine years as an offensive line coach with four colleges.

During his college coaching career, Reid was on the staff of several teams, including San Francisco State, Northern Arizona University, the University of Texas at El Paso, and the University of Missouri. In 1986, as coach at Northern Arizona, he coached Frank Pollack, who went on to play for six seasons with the San Francisco 49ers. In 1990 while at Missouri, he coached in the Fifth Down Game against Colorado; Eric Bieniemy, who would later become Reid's offensive coordinator with the Chiefs, was Colorado's starting running back.

=== Green Bay Packers (1992–1998) ===
Reid was hired by Holmgren at the Green Bay Packers in 1992, the same year quarterback Brett Favre became a member of that team, placing Reid in the Bill Walsh coaching tree. In 1995, he became the assistant offensive line and tight ends coach, where he helped lead the 1996 team to a Super Bowl XXXI win over the New England Patriots. Reid was named the Packers' quarterbacks coach in 1997, replacing Marty Mornhinweg, who left to be the offensive coordinator for his predecessor in Green Bay, Steve Mariucci. Mariucci wanted Reid to be his offensive coordinator with the San Francisco 49ers, but Holmgren prevented the move.

=== Philadelphia Eagles (1999–2012) ===
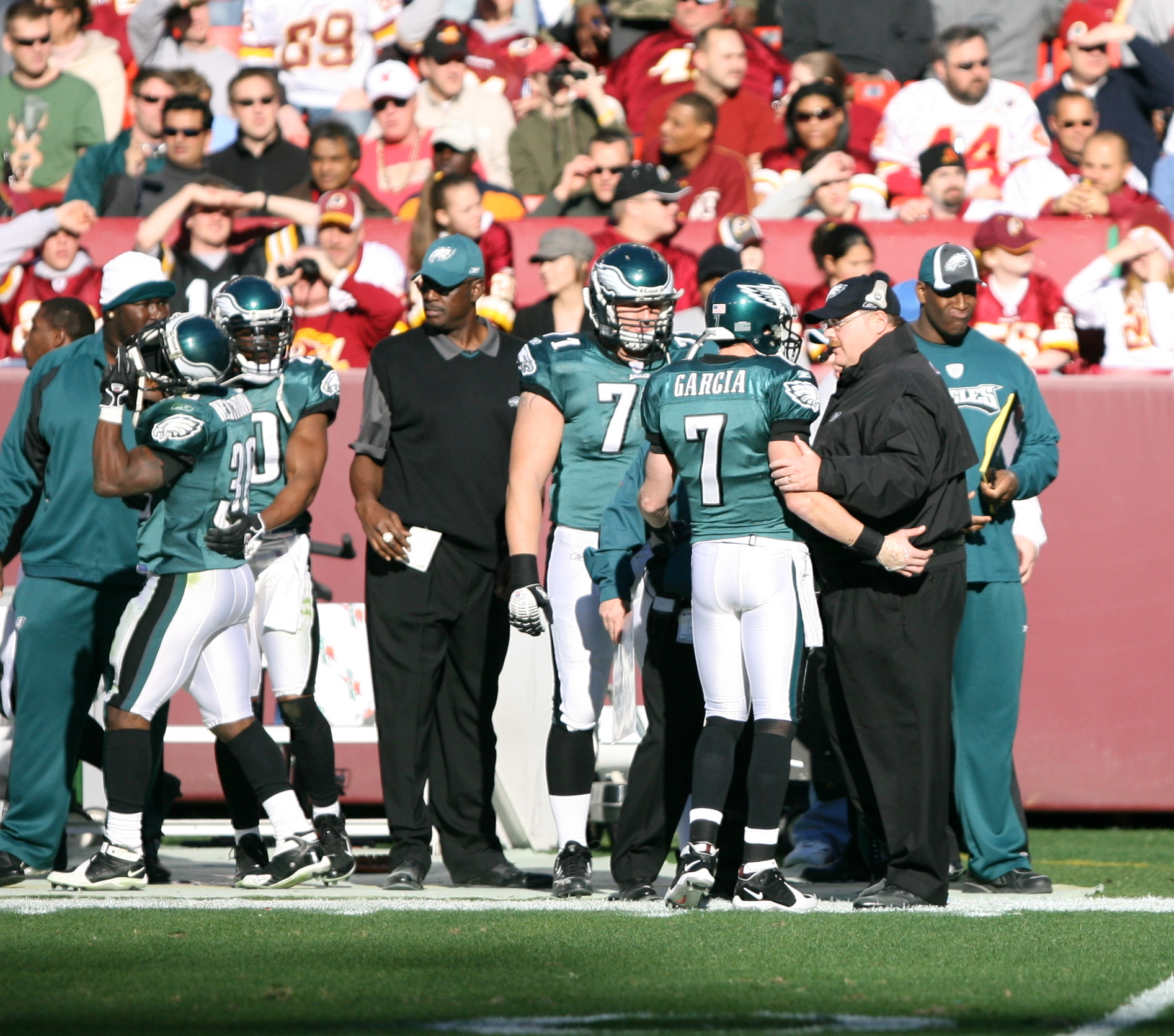
Reid speaking with Eagles' quarterback Jeff Garcia during a game against the Washington Redskins in December 2006

Consistent with his reputation for a focus on football details, Reid arrived at his interview with the Eagles with a five-inch thick book he developed on how he would go about running the team if given the job. The Eagles hired Reid on January 11, 1999; he was the second-youngest head coach in the league after Jon Gruden and the first then to be hired as a head coach without first having served as an offensive or defensive coordinator. Some in the Philadelphia news media criticized the hiring, citing the availability of other candidates who had already served previously as successful head coaches.

==== Donovan McNabb era (1999–2009) ====
As he set about leading the Eagles, one of Reid's first major decisions was drafting dual-threat quarterback Donovan McNabb in the first round with the second overall pick, although Reid started former Packers' backup Doug Pederson in the first nine games of the 1999 season. In Reid's first season in Philadelphia, the Eagles improved their record by two games over 1998, finishing 5–11. Among the five wins was the team's first road victory in 19 games, 20–16 over the Chicago Bears on October 17.

In 2000, the Eagles posted an 11–5 regular-season record and won their first playoff game since the 1995 season, beating the Tampa Bay Buccaneers in Philadelphia on New Year's Eve.

In 2001, Reid was named executive vice president of football operations of the Eagles, effectively making him the team's general manager. Although the Eagles had general managers after 2005 (Tom Heckert from 2005 to 2010 and Howie Roseman from 2010 until Reid's departure), Reid had the final say on football matters.

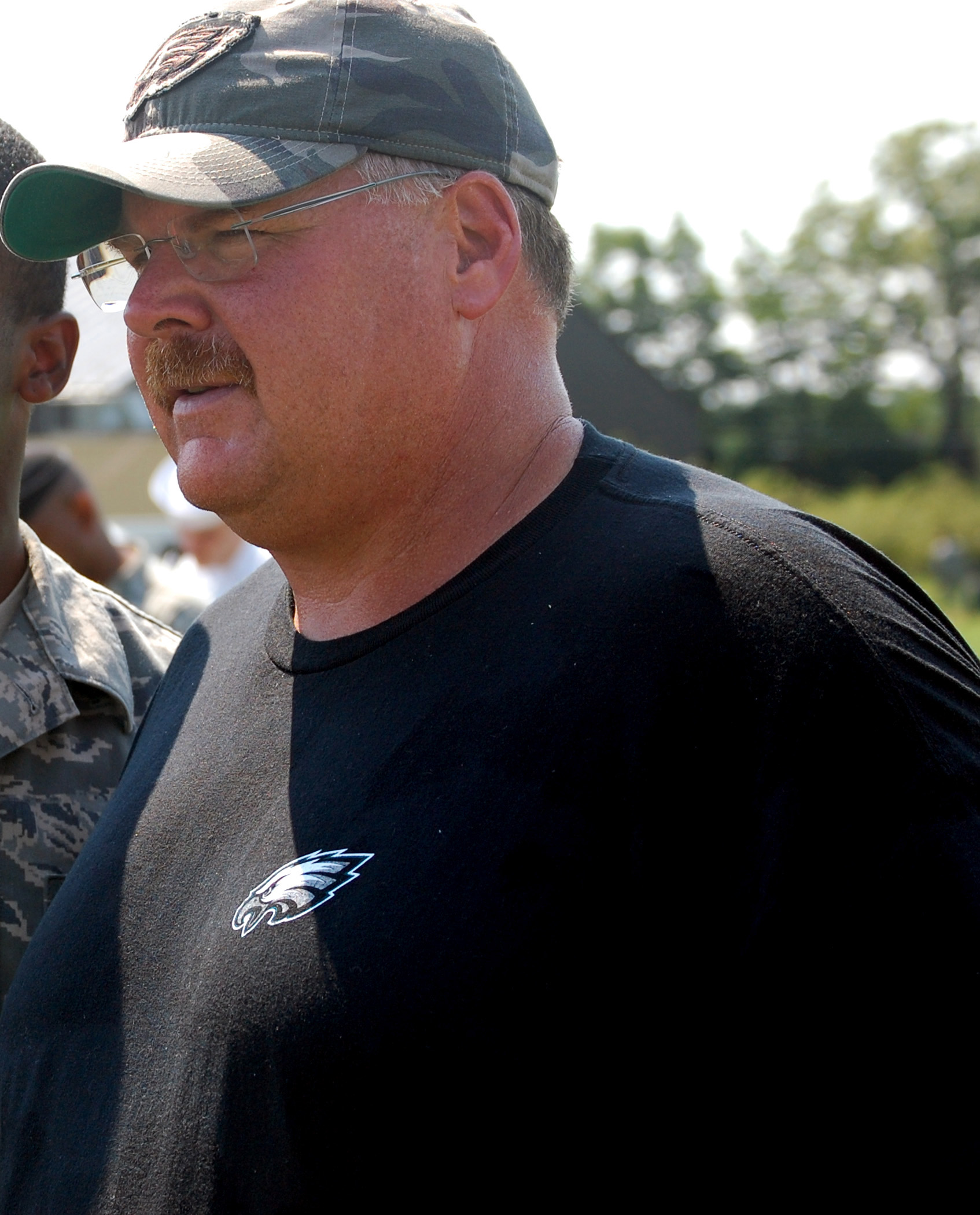
Reid during training camp at Lehigh University in Bethlehem, Pennsylvania, in August 2008

In 2001, Reid's Eagles won the first of four consecutive NFC East titles, the longest such streak in franchise history, and advanced to the conference championship game in 2001, 2002, 2003 and 2004, losing this game on the first three occasions.

The 2003 team qualified for postseason play after opening the season with two losses, both at home, and was also the first NFL team ever to reach the conference title round of the playoffs after having been shut out at home on opening day. The 2004 team was the second NFC East squad to defeat all of its division rivals (New York Giants, Dallas Cowboys, and Washington Redskins) twice during the same regular season (the Dallas Cowboys did it in 1998). The 2004 Eagles clinched the NFC #1-seed with a 13–1 record and proceeded to rest their starters for the final two games. After three straight NFC Championship losses, the team beat the Atlanta Falcons by a score of 27–10 and made it to Super Bowl XXXIX but fell to the New England Patriots 24–21.

The 2005 season was difficult for Reid as he sought to deal with wide receiver Terrell Owens' flamboyant persona, which forced Reid to permanently deactivate him midway through the 2005 season. A couple of weeks later quarterback Donovan McNabb suffered a season-ending injury, leaving the Eagles without the services of two of their star players. The Eagles lost eight of their last ten games and finished 6–10. With their third win of the season – a 23–20 win over the Oakland Raiders – Reid passed Greasy Neale to become the winningest coach in franchise history.

The Eagles had a rollercoaster campaign under Reid in 2006. The season appeared to be lost by October with another season-ending injury to McNabb, turning a 4–1 start into a mid-season breakdown which left the team 5–5. After a 45–21 defeat at the hands of the Indianapolis Colts, the Eagles were on the verge of elimination from the playoffs. Reid coached backup quarterback, Jeff Garcia, and the 5–6 Eagles, to victories over a slew of NFC rivals including the Carolina Panthers, Washington Redskins, New York Giants, and Dallas Cowboys. The Eagles, at 10–6, won the NFC East division title, as well as an NFC wild card game against the New York Giants. Their season ended at the hands of an opportune New Orleans Saints team in the NFC Divisional Round.

In the 2007 season, Reid led the Eagles to an 8–8 season. The Eagles failed to make the postseason.

In the 2008 season, Reid's 9–6–1 Eagles managed to defeat the defending Super Bowl Champion New York Giants in the divisional round, leading the team to a fifth NFC Championship game under his tenure, where they lost to the Arizona Cardinals by a score of 32–25. He coached the NFC to a 30–21 win in the 2009 Pro Bowl. However, the team season was marked with tragedy after the death of Jim Johnson, who had been the defensive coordinator for Reid's entire career and helped turn the Eagles into one of the NFL's elite defenses.

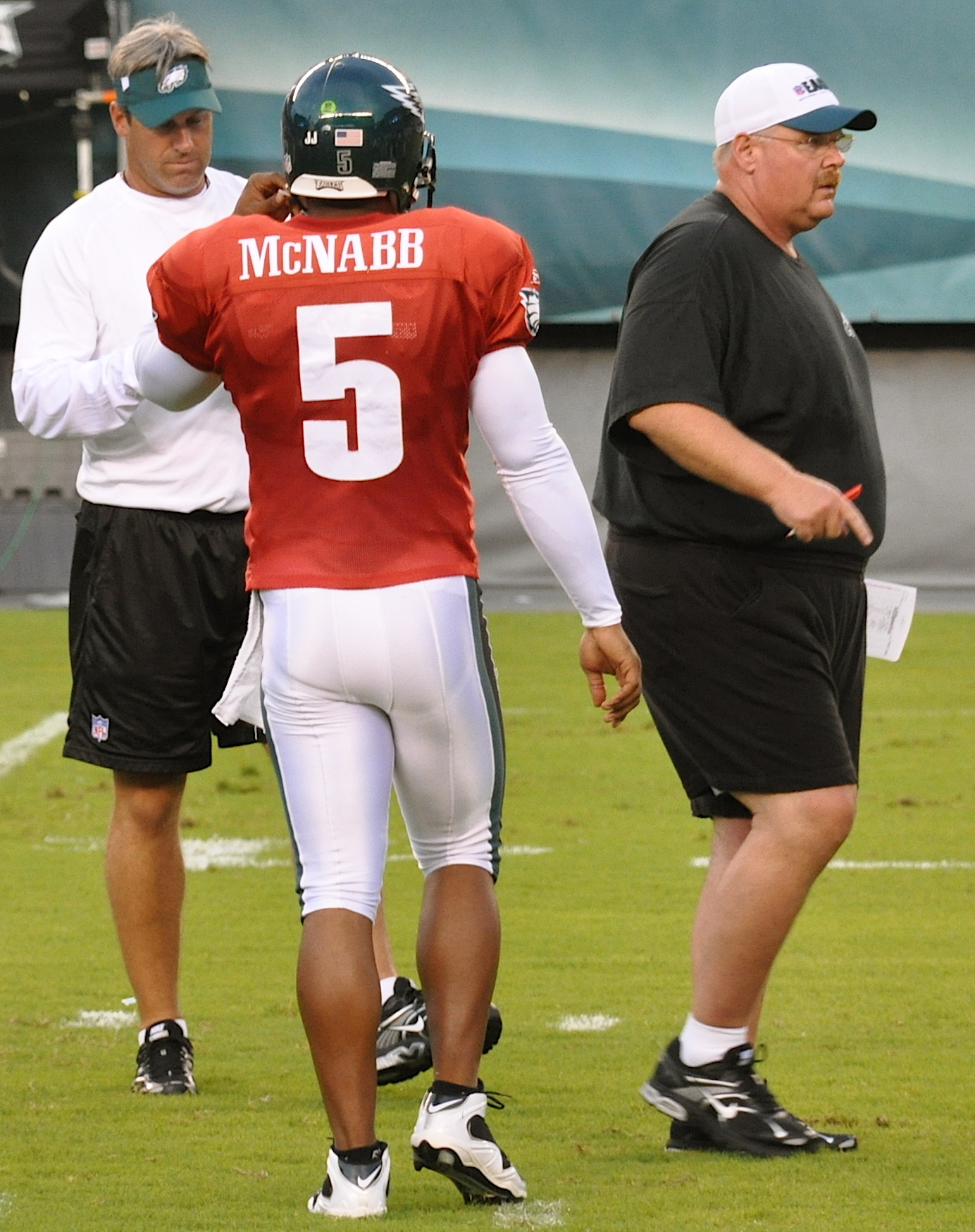
Reid with Eagles quarterback coach Doug Pederson (left) and Eagles quarterback Donovan McNabb in August 2009

In the 2009 season, Reid failed to win a first-round post-season game for the first time in his career, with his 11–5 Eagles being eliminated by the first place Dallas Cowboys by a score of 34–14 in the Wild Card Round.

==== Michael Vick era (2010–2012) ====
Over the offseason, the Eagles traded longtime starting quarterback Donovan McNabb to the Washington Redskins. With quarterback Kevin Kolb sustaining a concussion in the season opener of the 2010 season, Reid named Michael Vick the starting quarterback of the Eagles.

In the 2010 season, Reid led the Eagles to 10–6 record in the regular season and qualified for the playoffs after winning the final game of the season against the New York Giants with the Miracle at the New Meadowlands. In the Wild Card Round against the Green Bay Packers, the Eagles lost 21–16. Vick would be named NFL Comeback Player of the Year under Reid's tutelage. Reid was named the Earle "Greasy" Neale Award winner for the third time in 2010.

Prior to the 2011 season, the Eagles made several high-profile additions in the offseason, including Dominique Rodgers-Cromartie, Nnamdi Asomugha, Vince Young, Ronnie Brown, Evan Mathis, Steve Smith from the rival New York Giants, and Jason Babin. With the numerous signings in addition to the previous years' players, Young later enthusiastically commented during a training camp interview, calling the 2011 Eagles a "dream team". However, Reid and the Eagles failed to improve on the previous season's record, falling to 8–8 and failing to make the playoffs.

In the 2012 season, Reid and the Eagles struggled to a 4–12 record, the worst of his head coaching tenure. The year also marked the first time the Eagles missed the postseason in consecutive years under Reid. The season ended with a 42–7 loss to the New York Giants.

==== Departure and Eagles legacy ====
On December 31, 2012, the day after the season ended, Eagles owner Jeffrey Lurie announced that Reid's contract would not be renewed. Reid was the longest-tenured head coach in the NFL prior to his release. Reid provided encouragement to his successor as Eagles head coach, Chip Kelly.

Lurie said that Reid's induction into the Philadelphia Eagles Hall of Fame was inevitable, and players gave their former coach a standing ovation during his last meeting with them. During his 14-year tenure with the Eagles, Reid compiled the best win total (120), winning percentage (.609) and playoff victory total (10) in team history. He captured six division titles and five trips to the NFC Championship game. During this period, no other franchise earned more divisional playoff round appearances (7) and only Bill Belichick's New England Patriots exceeded Philadelphia's 5 conference championship game appearances with 6. Despite his success, however, Reid was ultimately unable to lead the Eagles to a Super Bowl title.

Reid sent 19 players to 44 Pro Bowl appearances, the highest total for any team in the NFL during that period. None of these players had ever appeared in a Pro Bowl before Reid was hired.

=== Kansas City Chiefs (2013–present) ===
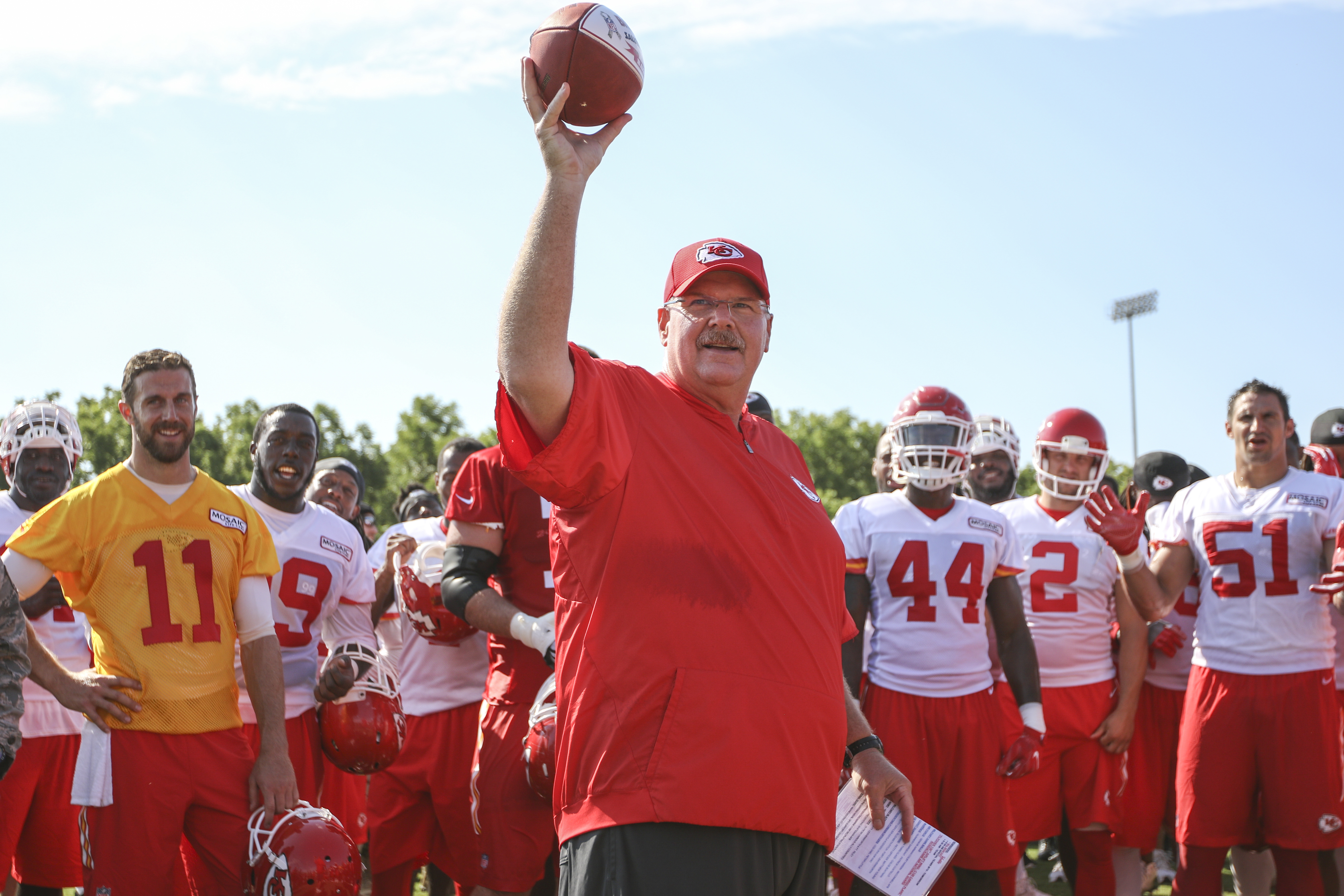
Reid in August 2016

Reid expected the Philadelphia Eagles to not extend him and was already preparing to hire a new coaching staff. Three teams reportedly had airplanes in Philadelphia to fly him to interviews. On January 4, 2013, Reid reached a five-year contract agreement to become the head coach of the Chiefs. That same day, the Chiefs fired general manager Scott Pioli. Reid's contract made him the final authority in football matters, the same power he had in Philadelphia. However, the Chiefs hired John Dorsey a week later, who had previously worked with Reid as an assistant in Green Bay, as general manager. Reid and Chiefs owner Clark Hunt announced that Dorsey would have the final say in personnel matters. That same day, Hunt announced that Reid and Dorsey would report to him on an equal basis; in the past Chiefs coaches reported to the general manager.

==== Alex Smith era (2013–2017) ====
On February 27, 2013, the Chiefs agreed to trade their second round pick in the 2013 NFL draft and a conditional pick in the 2014 NFL draft to the San Francisco 49ers for quarterback Alex Smith. The deal became official at the beginning of the new league year on March 12. Reid would announce Smith to be their starting quarterback for the upcoming season.

In Reid's first game as head coach, the Chiefs beat the Jacksonville Jaguars 28–2. It was the widest margin of victory for the Chiefs on opening day since they defeated the Denver Broncos in 1963 by a score of 59–7. In Week 3, Reid returned to Lincoln Financial Field in Philadelphia for a Thursday Night Football game between the Chiefs and his former team, the Philadelphia Eagles. As Reid walked out onto the field before the game started, the crowd gave him a standing ovation. The Chiefs went on to win 26–16 and Reid received a Gatorade shower from his team. Reid went on to lead the Chiefs to a 9–0 record to start the season, tied for the best start in franchise history. Despite losing five of their last seven games, the Chiefs finished with an 11–5 record to clinch a wild card spot in the AFC playoffs. In the wild card round, they were defeated by the Indianapolis Colts 45–44 after surrendering a 28-point lead in the third quarter. This was a remarkable turnaround from the previous season, in which the Chiefs finished with the worst record in franchise history at 2-14.

Under Reid, the Chiefs recorded a winning record in the 2014 season, finishing 9–7. However, they failed to qualify for the playoffs.

In 2015, the Chiefs were in danger of missing the playoffs for a second consecutive year after they lost five straight games to begin the season 1–5. Reid accepted the blame for his team's poor start and his future with the Chiefs was called into question. However, the Chiefs won every remaining regular-season game, finishing with an 11–5 record and a wild card spot in the AFC playoffs. Reid would go on to lead the Chiefs to their first playoff win since the 1993 season in a 30–0 shutout of the Houston Texans, but the team was defeated 27–20 in the Divisional Round against the New England Patriots. Prior to the loss, the Chiefs posted an eleven-game winning streak, which is the best in franchise history. Reid was criticized for his clock management near the end of the game, calling no timeouts in a late fourth-quarter drive that cut the Patriots' 27–13 lead down to a touchdown but took the Chiefs 5 minutes and 16 seconds to score and left them with only a minute and 13 seconds to try and tie the game.

Reid improved in the regular season with the 2016 Chiefs, who finished with a 12–4 record and clinched their division for the first time since 2010, as well as for the first time under Reid. The Chiefs went undefeated against their AFC West rivals to secure the division title on a tiebreaker with the 12–4 Oakland Raiders and obtain a first-round bye in the playoffs as the AFC's second seed. The bye was the Chiefs' first since 2003. Despite the team's regular-season success, the Chiefs were eliminated in the Divisional Round for a second consecutive year in an 18–16 loss to the Pittsburgh Steelers. Although the Chiefs were able to prevent the Steelers from scoring any touchdowns, they were unable to match the six field goals Pittsburgh converted.

The Chiefs started strong during the 2017 season, winning their first five games to become the NFL's last remaining undefeated team, including a victory against the defending Super Bowl champions New England Patriots in the kickoff game. After their strong start, the Chiefs lost six of their next seven games, resulting in Reid conceding play calling duties to offensive coordinator Matt Nagy. The Chiefs won their last four games to finish 10–6 and clinch the AFC West for a second consecutive year, the first back-to-back division titles in franchise history. The team ultimately suffered a sixth consecutive home playoff loss in a 22–21 defeat against the Tennessee Titans in the Wild Card Round. Despite holding a 21–3 lead at halftime, the Chiefs were shut out during the second half as the Titans scored 19 unanswered points to win the game. Following the season's end, Smith was traded to the Washington Redskins in exchange for cornerback Kendall Fuller and a third-round pick (78th overall) in the 2018 NFL draft.

==== Patrick Mahomes era (2018–present) ====
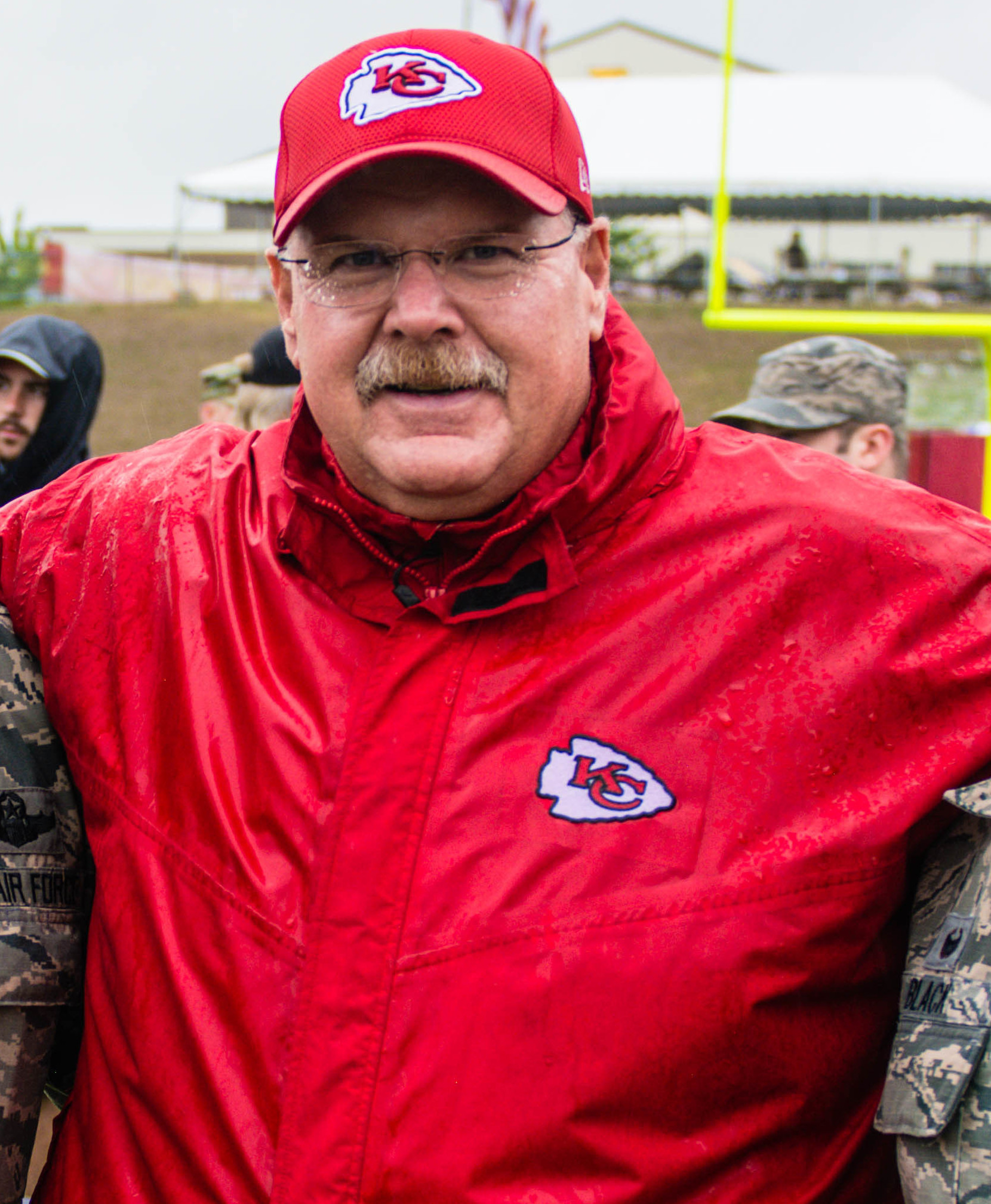
Reid in August 2018

The 2018 season saw new success for Reid and the Chiefs. Aided by the MVP season of quarterback Patrick Mahomes in his first year as the primary starter, the Chiefs finished the regular season as the AFC's top seed for the first time since 1997 and the first time with Reid as head coach by matching 2016's 12–4 record. Reid also extended the franchise record for consecutive division titles through clinching the AFC West for a third straight year. The Chiefs subsequently ended their home playoff losing streak by defeating the Indianapolis Colts 31–13 in the Divisional Round, the first postseason win at home since 1993. With the victory, the Chiefs hosted the AFC Championship for the first time in franchise history, which they lost 37–31 to the eventual Super Bowl LIII champion New England Patriots in overtime.

During the season, Reid recorded his 200th victory to become one of only nine NFL head coaches to win 200 games. With his 206th win at the end of the regular season, Reid also surpassed Marty Schottenheimer for the most wins of an NFL head coach to not win a championship.

The Chiefs again finished 12–4 in 2019 to win the AFC West for a fourth consecutive year and after defeating the Houston Texans 51–31 in the Divisional Round, hosted the AFC Championship for a second consecutive year. Upon securing an appearance in Super Bowl LIV with their 35–24 victory over the Tennessee Titans, Reid became one of only seven head coaches to lead two different franchises to a Super Bowl and the Chiefs made their first Super Bowl appearance since Super Bowl IV in 1970. The 15-year gap between Reid's first and second Super Bowls is the second longest after Dick Vermeil's 19 years. The Chiefs went on to defeat the San Francisco 49ers 31–20, earning the franchise their first Super Bowl victory in 50 years and Reid's first as a head coach.

Reid signed a contract extension with the Chiefs during their bye week in the 2020 season. At the time, the Chiefs were leading the AFC West with an 8–1 record. Three weeks later, they became the first AFC team to secure a playoff berth for the season. Kansas City finished with a league-best 14–2 record to secure the AFC's top seed. The 14–2 record marked the best in franchise history, in addition to being Reid's best as a head coach. During the postseason, the Chiefs defeated the Cleveland Browns 22–17 in the divisional round and the Buffalo Bills 38–24 in the AFC Championship to advance to Super Bowl LV against the Tampa Bay Buccaneers, their second consecutive Super Bowl appearance. The game ended in a 31–9 loss, with the Chiefs failing to score a touchdown and losing by double-digits for the first time under Mahomes.

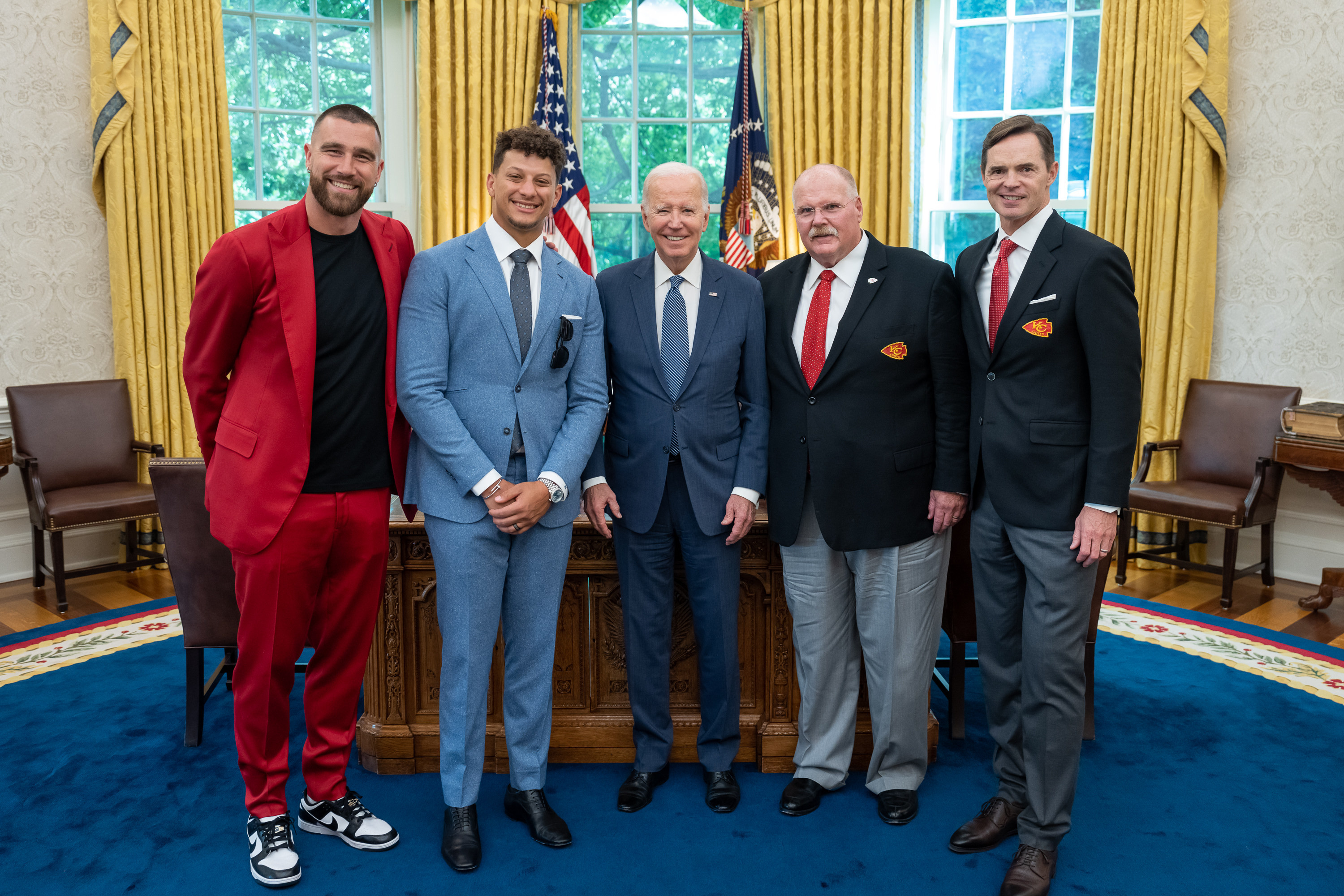
Left to right: Travis Kelce, Patrick Mahomes, U.S. president Joe Biden, Reid, and Mark Donovan in the Oval Office following Reid's second Super Bowl victory in Super Bowl LVII in June 2023

Following a Week 4 victory over the Philadelphia Eagles in 2021, Reid became the first NFL head coach to win 100 games with two different franchises. However, the Chiefs began the season 3–4, their first losing record since 2015. Nevertheless, they won nine of their 10 remaining games, including an eight-game winning streak, to clinch the AFC West and the AFC's #2 seed. Reid also won his 227th game to surpass Curly Lambeau as the NFL's fifth-most-winningest coach. In the playoffs, the Chiefs advanced to their fourth consecutive AFC Championship Game after defeating the Pittsburgh Steelers and Buffalo Bills, making Reid the first head coach to lead two different franchises to four consecutive conference championship games. The Chiefs lost the game 27–24 to the Cincinnati Bengals in overtime after surrendering a 21–3 lead, which was tied with the 2006 Indianapolis Colts' comeback against the New England Patriots as the largest in a conference championship.

Reid helped lead the Chiefs to a 14–3 record in the 2022 season. The Chiefs won the AFC West for the 7th consecutive season and earned a first-round bye as the top seed for the AFC playoffs. The Chiefs defeated the Jacksonville Jaguars in the Divisional Round and the Cincinnati Bengals in the AFC Championship to make the Super Bowl for the 3rd time in four seasons.

Reid's next Super Bowl appearance, Super Bowl LVII, pitted his Chiefs against the Philadelphia Eagles, whom he previously coached. He led the Chiefs to a narrow 38–35 victory over his former team to earn his second Super Bowl victory as a head coach. In the 2023 season, Reid led the Chiefs to an 11–6 record and another AFC West title. Reid earned a spot in his fifth Super Bowl in Super Bowl LVIII following victories over the Miami Dolphins in the Wild Card Round, the Buffalo Bills in the Divisional Round, and the Baltimore Ravens in the AFC Championship, the latter two were on the road. He became the fourth head coach in NFL history to reach five Super Bowls. In the Super Bowl, the Chiefs defeated the San Francisco 49ers 25–22 in only the second overtime game in Super Bowl history. Reid became a Super Bowl champion for the third time as head coach and the Chiefs became the first team to repeat since the New England Patriots did it in 2003 and 2004.

In the 2024 season, Reid led the Chiefs to a franchise-record 15 wins in the regular season. The team earned a first-round bye for the AFC playoffs as the top overall seed. Reid led the Chiefs to their third consecutive Super Bowl appearance following wins over the Houston Texans in the Divisional Round and the Buffalo Bills in the AFC Championship. He became the third coach to reach a sixth Super Bowl appearance. The Chiefs season ended with a 40–22 loss against the Eagles at Super Bowl LIX in a rematch of the game two years prior. Reid became the sixth coach in NFL history to lose three Super Bowls.

The 2025 season marked a down year for the Reid-led Chiefs. The team lost Mahomes during Week 15 against the Los Angeles Chargers due to an injury to his ACL and LCL. The team finished 6–11, Reid's first losing season with the Chiefs, ending their run of 9 straight AFC West division titles. The team also missed the postseason for the first time since 2014, ending their streak of seven consecutive AFC Championship appearances. With John Harbaugh of the Baltimore Ravens and Mike Tomlin of the Pittsburgh Steelers vacating their head coaching positions at the end of the season, Reid's 13 years with the Chiefs made him the league's longest-tenured head coach with a single team.

== Head coaching record ==
Team	Year	Regular season					Postseason			
Team	Year	Won	Lost	Ties	Win %	Finish	Won	Lost	Win %	Result
PHI	1999	5	11	0	.313	5th in NFC East	—	—	—	—
PHI	2000	11	5	0	.688	2nd in NFC East	1	1	.500	Lost to New York Giants in NFC Divisional Game
PHI	2001	11	5	0	.688	1st in NFC East	2	1	.667	Lost to St. Louis Rams in NFC Championship Game
PHI	2002	12	4	0	.750	1st in NFC East	1	1	.500	Lost to Tampa Bay Buccaneers in NFC Championship Game
PHI	2003	12	4	0	.750	1st in NFC East	1	1	.500	Lost to Carolina Panthers in NFC Championship Game
PHI	2004	13	3	0	.813	1st in NFC East	2	1	.667	Lost to New England Patriots in Super Bowl XXXIX
PHI	2005	6	10	0	.375	4th in NFC East	—	—	—	—
PHI	2006	10	6	0	.625	1st in NFC East	1	1	.500	Lost to New Orleans Saints in NFC Divisional Game
PHI	2007	8	8	0	.500	4th in NFC East	—	—	—	—
PHI	2008	9	6	1	.594	2nd in NFC East	2	1	.667	Lost to Arizona Cardinals in NFC Championship Game
PHI	2009	11	5	0	.688	2nd in NFC East	0	1	.000	Lost to Dallas Cowboys in NFC Wild Card Game
PHI	2010	10	6	0	.625	1st in NFC East	0	1	.000	Lost to Green Bay Packers in NFC Wild Card Game
PHI	2011	8	8	0	.500	2nd in NFC East	—	—	—	—
PHI	2012	4	12	0	.250	4th in NFC East	—	—	—	—
PHI total		130	93	1	.583		10	9	.526	
KC	2013	11	5	0	.688	2nd in AFC West	0	1	.000	Lost to Indianapolis Colts in AFC Wild Card Game
KC	2014	9	7	0	.563	2nd in AFC West	—	—	—	—
KC	2015	11	5	0	.688	2nd in AFC West	1	1	.500	Lost to New England Patriots in AFC Divisional Game
KC	2016	12	4	0	.750	1st in AFC West	0	1	.000	Lost to Pittsburgh Steelers in AFC Divisional Game
KC	2017	10	6	0	.625	1st in AFC West	0	1	.000	Lost to Tennessee Titans in AFC Wild Card Game
KC	2018	12	4	0	.750	1st in AFC West	1	1	.500	Lost to New England Patriots in AFC Championship Game
KC	2019	12	4	0	.750	1st in AFC West	3	0	1.000	Super Bowl LIV champions
KC	2020	14	2	0	.875	1st in AFC West	2	1	.667	Lost to Tampa Bay Buccaneers in Super Bowl LV
KC	2021	12	5	0	.706	1st in AFC West	2	1	.667	Lost to Cincinnati Bengals in AFC Championship Game
KC	2022	14	3	0	.824	1st in AFC West	3	0	1.000	Super Bowl LVII champions
KC	2023	11	6	0	.647	1st in AFC West	4	0	1.000	Super Bowl LVIII champions
KC	2024	15	2	0	.882	1st in AFC West	2	1	.667	Lost to Philadelphia Eagles in Super Bowl LIX
KC	2025	6	11	0	.353	3rd in AFC West	—	—	—	—
KC	2026	7	2	0	.778		—	—	—	—
KC total		156	66	0	.703		18	8	.692	
Total		286	159	1	.642		28	17	.622	

== Coaching tree ==
Reid has served under five head coaches:

- LaVell Edwards, BYU (1982)
- Vic Rowen, San Francisco State (1983–1985)
- Larry Kentera, Northern Arizona (1986)
- Bob Stull, UTEP (1987–1988), Missouri (1989–1991)
- Mike Holmgren, Green Bay Packers (1992–1998)

Eleven of Reid's coaching assistants have become head coaches in the NFL:

- Brad Childress, Minnesota Vikings (2006–2010)
- John Harbaugh, Baltimore Ravens (2008–2025), New York Giants (2026-present)
- Steve Spagnuolo, St. Louis Rams (2009–2011), New York Giants (2017, interim)
- Leslie Frazier, Minnesota Vikings (2010, interim, 2011–2013)
- Ron Rivera, Carolina Panthers (2011–2019), Washington Football Team / Commanders (2020–2023)
- Pat Shurmur, Cleveland Browns (2011–2012), Philadelphia Eagles (2015, interim), New York Giants (2018–2019)
- Todd Bowles, Miami Dolphins (2011, interim), New York Jets (2015–2018), Tampa Bay Buccaneers (2022–present)
- Doug Pederson, Philadelphia Eagles (2016–2020), Jacksonville Jaguars (2022–2024)
- Sean McDermott, Buffalo Bills (2017–2025)
- Matt Nagy, Chicago Bears (2018–2021)
- David Culley, Houston Texans (2021)
- Mike Kafka, New York Giants (2025 interim)

One of Reid's coaching assistants has become a head coach in NCAA:

- Mark Whipple, UMass (2014–2018)

Players that played for Andy Reid that have become head coaches:

- DeMeco Ryans, Houston Texans (2023–present)
- DeSean Jackson, Delaware State (2025–present)
- Michael Vick, Norfolk State (2025–present)
- Mike Kafka, New York Giants (2025, interim)

== Personal life ==
Reid is married with three sons and two daughters. Reid and his family are members of The Church of Jesus Christ of Latter-day Saints.

Reid's oldest son, Garrett, died of a heroin overdose on August 5, 2012. Britt, his second son, served as an assistant coach under his father until 2021 when he was suspended and not offered a new contract after he was involved in a DWI car accident causing severe injuries to a five-year-old girl. Spencer, his youngest son, is an assistant strength coach for the Chiefs.

Reid has appeared in commercials for State Farm with Patrick Mahomes and for Snickers. He made a guest cameo as himself in the 2024 Hallmark Channel original film Holiday Touchdown: A Chiefs Love Story.

Reid is known for his love of cheeseburgers. He has stated that he once ate 60 cheeseburgers while filming a State Farm commercial with Patrick Mahomes.

== See also ==
- List of National Football League head coach wins leaders
- List of professional gridiron football coaches with 200 wins
- List of Super Bowl head coaches
