= Fifth Down Game =

Fifth Down Game may refer to:

- Fifth Down Game (1940), Dartmouth vs. Cornell
- Fifth Down Game (1990), Colorado vs. Missouri
