= McCloughan =

McCloughan is an Irish surname. Notable people with the surname include:

- Dave McCloughan (born 1966), American football player
- Josh McCloughan (born 1975), Australian association football player
- Kent McCloughan (born 1940), American football player and talent scout, father of Scot and Dave
- Scot McCloughan (born 1971), American football general manager
- James McCloughan (born 1946), Vietnam War veteran and United States Army Medal of Honor recipient
