= Fifth Down Game (1990) =

Colorado–Missouri college football game

- Conference game
Colorado Buffaloes	Missouri Tigers
(3–1–1)	(2–2)
33	31
Head coach: Bill McCartney	Head coach: Bob Stull
AP / Coaches; 12 / 9
	1	2	3	4	Total
Colorado	7	7	3	16	33
Missouri	14	0	7	10	31
- Date: October 6, 1990
- Season: 1990
- Stadium: Faurot Field
- Location: Columbia, Missouri
- Referee: J.C. Louderback

The Fifth Down Game was a college football game on October 6, 1990, that included a play the crew officiating permitted in error. That play enabled the Colorado Buffaloes to defeat the Missouri Tigers by scoring a touchdown at the end of the game. The ensuing controversy cast doubt on Colorado's claim to Division I-A's 1990 national championship, which it went on to share with the Georgia Tech Yellow Jackets. It has been called one of the top memorable moments and blunders in college football history.

== Background ==
In American football, a team is allowed four downs, or plays, to move the ball ten yards toward the goal line. If the offense moves ten yards in four attempts or fewer, it gains a "first down," which restarts the process. If, after four attempts, the offense has neither scored nor gained ten yards, the other team is given possession of the ball. Under normal circumstances (for example, excluding penalties that can involve replaying a down), no team is supposed to be allowed five attempts. In this game, due to an officiating error, Colorado was given a fifth consecutive down, which they used to score the game-winning touchdown as time expired.

== Game recap ==
The game pitted Colorado against Big Eight rival Missouri and was played on October 6, 1990, in front of a crowd of 46,856. The game was played at Faurot Field, Missouri's home stadium in Columbia, Missouri. Colorado's starting quarterback, Darian Hagan, was injured and backup quarterback Charles Johnson, (Note: Two players named Charles Johnson played in this game for Colorado. One of these, the backup quarterback in the 1990 season, played the entire 1990 Fifth Down game as a substitute for Darian Hagan. However, this player never played in the NFL. The other Charles Johnson was a wide receiver in the 1990 season. It appeared that Johnson never actually made it into the end zone before the play was called dead by the referee. A series of photos shown in the Columbia Daily Tribune on October 7, 1990 showed Johnson was on his back with the ball well short of the goal line on the 5th down play and then lifted the ball over the goal line. Fans at the goal line also said he was tackled short of the goal line and the ball didn't cross the goal line until after the play was blown dead.) who had some playing time the previous week and season, played instead. However, Colorado was still heavily favored to win. Colorado was ranked #12 in the nation by the Associated Press while Missouri was unranked (i.e. below the top 25). Colorado's record coming into the game was 3–1–1 (three wins, one loss, one tie) with wins over #12 Washington, #20 Texas, and unranked Stanford; their loss to #21-ranked Illinois and the tie to #8 Tennessee. Missouri was 2–2 (two wins, two losses), coming into the game with wins over #21 Arizona State and unranked Utah State and losses to unranked TCU and Indiana.

The lead in this game changed several times, and several big plays kept the momentum swinging. With less than three minutes to go, Colorado took possession of the ball deep in its own territory trailing 31–27. Johnson led the team on a last-ditch drive. With about 40 seconds to go, he completed a pass to Colorado tight end Jon Boman, who fell down just yards short of the goal line. Boman slipped due to the poor conditions of the field, which saw the Buffaloes slip on the turf repeatedly throughout the game. This play gave the Buffaloes a first down, but it led to immediate confusion because they were running a hurry-up offense.

On first down, Johnson spiked the ball to stop the clock. On the next play, with the down marker accurately indicating second down, a power run into the line by Eric Bieniemy was stopped just short of the goal line. Colorado then called its third and final timeout. During the timeout, the chain crew failed to flip the down marker to note that it was now third down.

A 2010 ESPN article lists the factors that possibly contributed to the confusion among the chain crew, referee J. C. Louderback, and the rest of the officiating crew during the timeout. For one, not every official at the time was required to wear a down indicator or rubber bands on their hands to independently keep track of the current down, putting the band around their index finger when it is first down, the middle finger when it is second down, and so on. Second, this was the first year in which the quarterback spike was legal in college football; many officials had not seen one before. The officials may not have clearly seen that Johnson's action was a spike and may have thought that the ball was inadvertently kicked and reset and therefore that the down did not change to second at that point. In addition, the chain crew member holding the down marker became distracted during the timeout as his attention drifted to what was happening in the stands, where EMTs were performing CPR on a fan who had suffered a fatal heart attack. Furthermore, Louderback himself forgot to signal third down. He immediately went to the Colorado sideline to alert head coach Bill McCartney that the Buffaloes had no more timeouts; the brief conversation between Louderback and McCartney as they looked at the incorrect down marker cemented their misconception as to what the down was.

On the next play, with the down marker showing second down when it was really third down, the Buffaloes made the same call and Bieniemy was again stopped short of the end zone. Johnson then spiked the ball (thinking it was third down when it was really fourth) to stop the clock with two seconds left. He later claimed that he had no idea the officials had made a mistake, and believed that he was spiking the ball on third down. On the following play—fourth down according to the marker, but "fifth down" in reality—Johnson kept the ball himself and scored a touchdown.

By this time, Louderback and his officiating crew had realized their mistake and conferred for nearly 20 minutes to decide their course of action. During the delay, radio and television announcers also noticed that Colorado had scored with the help of an additional play. Louderback was shown on the phone. After a lengthy consultation, the officials announced their decision: the touchdown counted, giving Colorado a 33–31 lead, and the Buffs would have to attempt the extra point. The rules do not require the extra point try if time has expired and the result will not affect the outcome of the game. However, since Colorado led by only two, Missouri could have potentially blocked the try and returned it for two points to tie the game, thus the try was required. Not wanting to take this chance, Johnson took the snap and went to a knee, allowing the Buffaloes to go home with a controversial win.

Another controversy overshadowed by the "fifth down" was that it remains inconclusive as to whether Johnson had crossed the goal line on his touchdown.

=== Scoring details ===
Team	Description	Score	Time	Quarter
MU	Bailey 19yd pass from Kiefer (Jacke kick)	0–7	11:10	1
CU	Bieniemy 29yd run (Harper kick)	7–7	3:19	1
MU	Mays 49yd pass from Kiefer (Jacke kick)	7–14	1:55	1
CU	Pritchard 68yd run (Harper kick)	14–14	1:45	2
CU	Harper 35yd FG	17–14	10:51	3
MU	Jones 13yd run (Jacke Kick)	17–21	7:30	3
CU	Pritchard 70yd pass from Johnson (Harper kick)	24–21	13:56	4
MU	Jacke 45yd FG	24–24	11:11	4
CU	Harper 39yd FG	27–24	3:41	4
MU	Mays 38yd pass from Kiefer (Jacke kick)	27–31	2:32	4
CU	Johnson 1yd run (conv. failed)	33–31	0:00	4

== Aftermath ==
Colorado football coach Bill McCartney, a former Missouri Tigers player, did little to soothe the controversy. Asked whether he would consider forfeiting the game, McCartney declared that he had considered it but decided against it because "the field was lousy." He complained about Missouri's notorious Omniturf artificial turf surface, which he said had caused repeated slips and falls during the game.

Missouri chancellor Haskell Monroe appealed to the Big Eight, arguing that since Colorado's game-winning touchdown had come on a play that should have never been run, Missouri should be declared the winner 31–27. However, he was rebuffed by Big Eight commissioner Carl James, who said in a statement that "the allowance of the fifth down to Colorado is not a post-game correctable error," and therefore Colorado's win would stand.

Some closure came in the summer of 1998, four years after McCartney retired as the Buffs' head coach, when he admitted to making mistakes and being saddened by the Fifth Down fiasco. McCartney made the remarks at a Promise Keepers gathering at the site of the controversy in Columbia, Missouri.

Although Colorado was allowed to keep its win, Louderback and his entire officiating crew were suspended for a week following the contest.

== National championship ==
Prior to the creation of the Bowl Coalition in 1992, no mechanism existed to arrange postseason bowl matchups to better determine a champion; conference bowl contracts would often yield the top four to six teams in the country playing in entirely separate bowls. In the early 1990s, two polls were regarded as authoritative: A poll of sportswriters conducted by the Associated Press (AP) called the AP Poll, and a poll of college football coaches conducted by the American Football Coaches Association called the Coaches Poll. These polls were conducted weekly during the football season, and the final polls (in January, after all bowl games) determined the championship.

Because 1990 was a year in which no single college football team was dominant, the Fifth Down controversy played a role in determining the Division I-A national champion for the season. The Missouri win, amazingly, was one of three controversial wins for Colorado in 1990. Earlier in the season, Colorado had been awarded with a TD on 4th and goal against Stanford with 16 seconds left, but replays made it unclear if Colorado had gotten over the goal line on the play. Stanford coach Dennis Green said he thought officials would have ruled Colorado short if the game had been at Stanford. Most pollsters dropped Colorado's ranking to 14th, apparently feeling that its win over Missouri was not legitimate. However, most of the top teams lost in subsequent weeks, while the Buffaloes won their remaining games, including a 27–12 victory in Lincoln over #3 Nebraska to give them the Big Eight title, and a squeaker over #5 Notre Dame. The Orange Bowl victory over Notre Dame was considered very controversial as well, due to a clipping call on Notre Dame on a punt return touchdown late in the game by Raghib Ismail when Colorado held a 10–9 lead, which would be the final score after Notre Dame was assessed the penalty. A blocked extra point by Colorado turned out to be the winning margin.

Colorado finished the 1990 season with a record of 11–1–1, while the Georgia Tech Yellow Jackets' record was 11–0–1. No Division I-A team had an unblemished record, and only Georgia Tech finished without a loss.

After the conclusion of the 1990 season in January 1991, the AP Poll voted Colorado national champions. The Coaches Poll voted the championship to Georgia Tech. Both universities therefore claim the 1990 championship. Observers favoring Colorado for the national championship noted that they had played a more difficult schedule than Georgia Tech. Those favoring Georgia Tech not only pointed out that the Yellow Jackets were the only undefeated team in the nation, but also pointed to the tainted victory in the "Fifth Down" game. With a loss at Missouri, Colorado's record would have been 10–2–1, and the Buffaloes may not have been as strongly considered for the national title with that record. Colorado was also less convincing in its bowl game, needing the controversial clipping call to defeat Notre Dame by 1 point; meanwhile, Georgia Tech convincingly routed Nebraska in the 1991 Citrus Bowl, 45–21. No team had ever been voted National Champion in either the Associated Press Poll or the Coaches' Poll following a season in which they lost or tied more than two games total.

Missouri ended the 1990 season with a record of 4–7. The Tigers had not had a winning season since 1983, and would not have another winning season until 1997 under Larry Smith. They would not return to contender status until the middle of the 2000s under Gary Pinkel. The surface at Faurot Field was changed back to its original surface of natural grass in 1995 (the OmniTurf was installed in 1985), and in 2003 to FieldTurf, a rubber-infilled artificial turf that closely simulates grass.

The Colorado-Missouri series went dormant after the Buffaloes left the Big 12 for the Pac-12 Conference on July 1, 2011. The Tigers departed the Big 12 on July 1, 2012, to join the Southeastern Conference. However, the two teams will play each other again in a non-conference, home-and-away series in 2030 and 2031. The 2030 game will be held at Columbia near the 40th anniversary of the Fifth Down, while the 2031 fixture will be played at Boulder.

== Precedents ==
Similar events had occurred in college football prior to Colorado's Fifth Down. Until 1990, the phrase "Fifth Down Game" described the Dartmouth-Cornell game of 1940, which is the first occurrence of a fifth down in college football.

During a 1968 National Football League game between the Chicago Bears and Los Angeles Rams, the Rams were victimized when they lost a down. The Rams were penalized for holding during a last-minute drive. The officiating crew not only assessed the 15-yard penalty, but also advanced the down marker from first to second. Holding does not carry a loss of down under the rules. Nobody in the press box or on the field noticed, and the Rams turned the ball over on downs, their last possession in a 17–16 loss.

In 1972, the University of Miami was the beneficiary of a "fifth down" in its game against Tulane. Officials mistakenly called the Miami offense back on the field for another down after it had turned the ball over on downs. Miami scored a touchdown on the next play to win the game, 24–21.

== See also ==
- Fifth Down Game (1940)
- 1990 NCAA Division I-A football season
- 1991 Orange Bowl
- Flea Kicker
- The Play (American football)
- List of nicknamed college football games and plays
