= Bob Krieger =

American football player (1918–1980)

- Krieger, c. 1938

No. 82, 89
- Position: End

Personal information
- Born: May 2, 1918; Minneapolis, Minnesota, U.S.
- Died: October 17, 1980 (aged 62); Minneapolis, Minnesota, U.S.
- Listed height: 6 ft 1 in (1.85 m)
- Listed weight: 190 lb (86 kg)

Career information
- High school: West (Minneapolis, Minnesota)
- College: Dartmouth (1937–1940)
- NFL draft: 1941: undrafted

Career history
- Philadelphia Eagles (1941, 1946)

Career NFL statistics
- Receptions: 21
- Receiving yards: 287
- Touchdowns: 2
- Stats at Pro Football Reference

Robert E. Krieger (May 2, 1918 – October 17, 1980) was an American professional football player. An end, he earned all-city honors in high school, then played college football for the Dartmouth Indians from 1937 to 1940. Krieger kicked the game-winning field goal in the famous Fifth Down Game over Cornell. He signed with the Philadelphia Eagles of the National Football League (NFL) in 1941 and was the only player on the team to start all 11 games that season. Krieger served in World War II in the United States Army Air Forces before returning to the Eagles for a second and final season in 1946.

== Early life ==
Robert E. Krieger was born on May 2, 1918, in Minneapolis, Minnesota. His father, George, played college football at Heidelberg University, and was later a coach. Krieger attended West High School in Minneapolis, where he competed in football, baseball and basketball. He played end with the football team before later switching to fullback. He earned all-city honors at end in 1935 and at fullback as a senior in 1936. Considered a triple-threat man, Krieger was described by The Minneapolis Journal as "probably one of the finest backs" in conference history, and the paper said his runs "were a poetry of motion". He was named West's most outstanding player for the 1936 season, in which they finished second in league standings. After high school, Krieger enrolled at Dartmouth College in New Hampshire.

== College career ==
Krieger attended Dartmouth from 1937 to 1940 and played for the Dartmouth Indians football team. He was a top player with the freshman team in 1937. Krieger then earned varsity letters the following three years. As a sophomore in 1938, he was a backup halfback and played punter, as the Indians compiled a record of 7–2. He won a starting role in 1939, beginning at right halfback before being shifted to left halfback, and later to end. Krieger helped the 1939 Dartmouth team to a record of 5–3–1 and posted two touchdowns in a win that year against the Yale Bulldogs. He remained starting end as a senior in 1940, as Dartmouth went 5–4. Krieger kicked the game-winning field goal in Dartmouth's victory in the Fifth Down Game over Cornell. At the conclusion of his collegiate career, he was named to the Eastern College All-Star team. While at Dartmouth, Krieger also spent time with the basketball team.

== Professional career ==
After going unselected in the 1941 NFL draft, Krieger signed with the Philadelphia Eagles in August 1941 as an undrafted free agent. Playing left end, he appeared in and started all 11 games for the 1941 Eagles, the only player on the team to do so. Krieger caught 19 passes for 240 yards and two touchdowns, placing second on the Eagles and 10th in the NFL in receiving. With 12 points, he was the Eagles' fourth-leading scorer on a team that went 2–8–1. After the NFL season, he served in the United States Army Air Forces during World War II. He was a member of the football team at Thunderbird Field in Arizona in 1942.

During the war, Krieger flew over 30 missions in Germany piloting a B-24 Liberator bomber. A lieutenant, he received the Distinguished Flying Cross and the Air Medal with four oak leaf clusters.

After the war, Krieger returned to the Eagles in October 1946. He appeared in seven games, two as a starter, for the 1946 Eagles, a team that went 6–5. Krieger finished the season with two receptions for 47 yards. Krieger did not return to the Eagles in 1947 and began working back in Minnesota for the Superior Separator Company in the sales department. In his NFL career, he appeared in 18 games, 13 as a starter, and caught 21 passes for 287 yards and two touchdowns.

== Personal life ==
Krieger married Gretchen Heynacher in September 1941. He married in Minnesota, and flew to Wisconsin and played in an Eagles game the next day. In 1949, he took a job working in insurance. Two years later, he served as a part-time assistant coach and scout for the Minnesota Golden Gophers. With his wife, Krieger had two daughters and a son. His son, also named Bob, played ice hockey.

Krieger died on October 17, 1980, in Minneapolis. He was posthumously inducted into Dartmouth's athletic hall of fame in 2004.
