= Britt Reid (American football) =

American football coach (born 1985)

Personal information
- Born: April 28, 1985 (age 41); San Francisco, California, U.S.

Career information
- High school: Harriton (Rosemont, Pennsylvania)
- College: Temple

Career history
- St. Joseph's Prep. (2008) Assistant offensive line; Philadelphia Eagles (2009) Training camp coordinator intern; Temple (2011–2012) Graduate assistant; Kansas City Chiefs (2013–2014) Defensive quality control; Kansas City Chiefs (2015) Assistant defensive line; Kansas City Chiefs (2016–2018) Defensive line; Kansas City Chiefs (2019–2020) Linebackers/outside linebackers

Awards and highlights
- Super Bowl champion (LIV)

Britt Reid (born April 28, 1985) is an American former football coach. He most recently served as an outside linebackers coach for the Kansas City Chiefs of the National Football League (NFL). His coaching career began when he worked for his father Andy Reid as a Practice Squad Coach Intern in 2009 with the Philadelphia Eagles and continued as he worked in multiple defensive coaching positions for his father with the Kansas City Chiefs from 2013 to 2020. Reid won Super Bowl LIV as the Chiefs' linebackers and outside linebackers coach.

== Early life ==
Reid is the son of Andy Reid. For four years, he played football at Harriton High School, in the suburbs of Philadelphia, serving as the team captain for three seasons. Reid played in the East-West All-Star Game as a senior. He attended college at Temple University and received a bachelor's degree in communications.

== Coaching career ==
In 2008, Reid was an assistant offensive line coach at St. Joseph's Preparatory School in Philadelphia.

In 2009, he was a training camp coordinator intern for the Philadelphia Eagles, under his father, Andy Reid. Prior to his graduation, Reid served as a student assistant for the Temple football program for two seasons assisting the offense. Reid also spent two years (2011–12) working at the Steve Addazio football camp.

Following his graduation, he joined his father on the Kansas City Chiefs coaching staff in 2013 as the Defensive Quality Control Coach. This was followed by Assistant Defensive Line Coach in 2015, the Defensive Line Coach from 2016 to 2018, and the Linebackers/outside linebackers Coach when the Chiefs won Super Bowl LIV. As a result of being charged with a DWI in February 2021 (see below), he was placed on administrative leave by the Chiefs and did not coach at Super Bowl LV, which the Chiefs lost 31-9 to the Tampa Bay Buccaneers. At the end of the 2020 season, his contract with the Chiefs was allowed to expire after which it was not renewed.

== Legal troubles ==
In 2007, Britt was sentenced to 8 to 23 months in jail alongside his brother Garrett for running what a Norristown, Pennsylvania, judge then called a "drug emporium" out of the Reid residence.

The same year, in 2007, Reid was involved in a road rage incident in which he allegedly pointed a gun at another man's face. A lawsuit was eventually settled out of court for an undisclosed sum in 2014.

=== DWI conviction ===
Reid crashed into two parked cars on February 4, 2021, injuring two young children, near the Chiefs' training complex, just a few days before Super Bowl LV. Reid admitted to officers he had consumed two to three drinks earlier in the evening and was on Adderall, a prescription medication used to treat attention deficit disorder. Two hours after the crash, according to a probable cause statement, Reid had a blood alcohol concentration of 0.113, above the legal limit of 0.08. Reid, as well as a five-year-old passenger of another vehicle, were both hospitalized.

The five-year-old passenger was in critical condition and spent ten days in a coma. On April 2, 2021, roughly two months after the accident, the five-year-old girl was released from the hospital, still unable to walk or talk and being fed through a feeding tube. On November 19, 2021, the Kansas City Chiefs announced that they would pay for all of the medical expenses for the five-year-old and provide her "long-term financial stability".

The incident led the Chiefs to not renew Reid's contract, which expired at the end of the 2020 season.

On April 12, 2021, Reid was charged with a DWI, which is a class D felony in Missouri, which carries a maximum sentence of seven years in prison.

Reid pleaded guilty to the charges on September 12, 2022, as part of a plea deal. The plea deal resulted in his sentence ranging from probation to four years in prison. He was sentenced to 3 years in prison on November 1, 2022.

On March 1, 2024, the governor of Missouri Mike Parson commuted Reid’s sentence, and Reid served the remainder of his term under house arrest until October 31, 2025.
