= Fifth Down Game (1940) =

Cornell–Dartmouth college football game

The Fifth Down Game
Cornell Big Red	Dartmouth Indians
(6–0)	(3–4)
0	3
Head coach: Carl Snavely	Head coach: Earl Blaik
AP 2
	1	2	3	4	Total
Cornell	0	0	0	0	0
Dartmouth	0	0	0	3	3
- Date: November 16, 1940
- Season: 1940
- Stadium: Memorial Field
- Location: Hanover, New Hampshire

The Fifth Down Game was a college football game between the teams of Cornell Big Red and Dartmouth Indians. The game was conceded by Cornell after films confirmed that errors by the game officials had allowed an unpermitted fifth down as the last play of the game.

== Background ==
In American football, a team is allowed four attempts or "downs" to move the ball 10 yards (9.14 m) or towards the goal line. If the offense moves ten yards in four attempts or fewer, it gains a "first down," which restarts the process. If, after four attempts, the offense has neither scored nor gained ten yards, the other team is given possession of the ball. Under normal circumstances (for example, excluding penalties which can involve replaying a down), no team is supposed to be allowed five attempts.

== Game ==
Cornell entered the contest with 18 straight victories over a two-year period.

Dartmouth would manage to hold off Cornell's offense for nearly the entire low-scoring game. Dartmouth scored first, with Bob Krieger kicking a field goal (for three points) in the fourth quarter.

Finally, with less than a minute left in the game, Cornell got the ball on Dartmouth's six-yard line. Cornell expected to have four chances to win the game. On its first down, fullback Mort Landsberg gained three yards. On its second down, Cornell halfback Walt Scholl managed to run the ball to the one-yard line. On the third down, Landsberg tried to run up the middle but did not gain more than a few inches.

On the fourth down, Cornell was penalized for delay of game, and referee Red Friesell spotted the ball just over the 5-yard line in order to replay the fourth down. With nine seconds left on the clock, quarterback "Pop" Scholl threw an incomplete pass into the end zone.

Normally, the ball would have gone to Dartmouth, which would have used up the remaining seconds and won the game, 3–0. Following the fourth down, linesman Joe McKenney had signaled that it was first down and that the ball should go to Dartmouth at the 20 yard line. Referee Friesell, erroneously believing it was now fourth down, placed the ball on the six-yard line, granting Cornell a "fifth" down.

Making the most of the unexpected opportunity, quarterback Scholl threw a touchdown pass to William Murphy, and following the extra-point kick, Cornell won the game 7–3.

== Forfeit ==
Officials discovered their error after reviewing the game films. Cornell's players, coach Carl Snavely, acting athletic director Bob Kane, and President Edmund Ezra Day, a Dartmouth alumnus, agreed that Cornell should send a telegram to Dartmouth offering to forfeit the game, which Dartmouth accepted.

If the schools had not made this agreement, it is unclear how or if the dispute would have been resolved: while Friesell admitted his mistake to the Eastern Intercollegiate Football Association, he acknowledged that his authority "ceased at the close of the game".

Similarly, the association's role was to schedule the referees, not to review or overturn game results. College football's only "official" record books at the time were kept by private publishers, based on information provided by individual schools.

The New York Times compared the Fifth Down Game to a 1922 contest between Columbia and NYU where the schools disagreed on whether the deciding play counted as a touchdown or a safety. The newspaper noted that, as of 1940, both schools continued to claim that game as a win, and at least one record book publisher compromised by listing it as a Columbia win on Columbia's page, and an NYU win on NYU's page.

== Aftermath ==
Although there is some doubt whether the 1940 Cornell forfeit was official according to NCAA rules, the game is regarded as a 3–0 Dartmouth victory, instead of a 7–3 triumph by Cornell.

This was described in press accounts as the only time in the history of football that a game was decided off the field.

== Sources ==
- Cory Bennett, "Part II: The Fifth-Down Game," The Cornell Daily Sun (November 8, 2007)
- Cory Bennett, "Part III: The Nation Reacts in Wake of Concession," The Cornell Daily Sun (November 8, 2007)
- "The Infamous Fifth Down: Cornell vs. Dartmouth," YouTube
- Beano Cook, "Beano Cook's top 10 moments in college football," ESPN.Com

== See also ==
- Cornell–Dartmouth football rivalry
- List of nicknamed college football games and plays
- 1940 Cornell Big Red football team
- 1940 Dartmouth Indians football team
