= Down (gridiron football) =

Period in which a play transpires in gridiron football

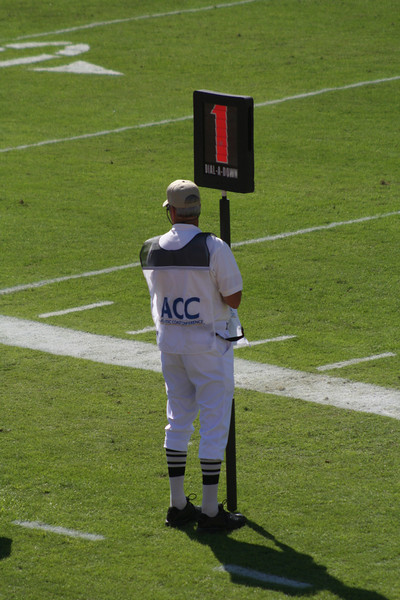
A down marker showing first down along the sideline of a collegiate game

A down in gridiron football is an attempt by the offensive team to run a play to advance the ball, while the defending team simultaneously attempts to halt their advance. The down is a distinguishing characteristic of the game compared to other codes of football, but is synonymous with a "tackle" in rugby league.

The team in possession of the football has a limited number of downs (four in American football, three in Canadian football) to advance ten yards or more towards their opponent's goal line (end zone). If they advance ten yards, they are awarded a first down, or another set of downs to advance a further ten yards. If they fail to advance that far after using all of their downs, possession of the ball is turned over to the other team. In most situations if a team reaches the final down, they will punt to their opponent, which forces them to begin their drive from further down the field; if they are in range, they might instead attempt to kick a field goal.

== Description ==
Electronic down marker at the UCLA Bruins at California Golden Bears football game on September 5, 2026

A down begins with a snap or free kick (such as a kickoff or safety kick) and ends when the ball or the player in possession of it is declared down by an official, a team scores, or the ball or player in possession of it leaves the field of play.

The player with possession of the ball after he has been tackled or is otherwise unable to advance the ball further on account of the play having ended is down (e.g., "He is down at the 34-yard line").

Down may also refer to the ball after it is made dead in one manner or another. The line of scrimmage for the next play will be determined by the position of the ball when it is down.

Each possession begins with first down. The line to gain is marked 10 yards downfield from the start of this possession, and the situation is described as "1st and 10" (if the goal line is less than 10 yards downfield, then the goal line is the line to gain and the situation is "1st and goal"). If the offensive team moves the ball past the line to gain, they make a new first down. If they fail to do this after a specified number of downs (four in American play and three in Canadian play), the team turns the ball over on downs, and possession of the ball reverts to the opposing team at the spot where the ball was downed at the end of the last down.

If a penalty against the defensive team moves the ball past the line to gain, the offensive team gets a new first down. Some defensive penalties give the offense an automatic first down regardless of the distance.

When the offensive team reaches the final down, the team faces a last down situation (third down situation in Canadian play and fourth down situation in American play), where the team must decide whether to use a running or passing play in an attempt to gain a first down (this is called going for it), or alternatively to kick the ball (either by punting or attempting a field goal). Though statistical analysis of games suggests playing more aggressively is the better option, kicking the ball is typically seen as the safer solution; scrimmaging may lead to a turnover on downs, potentially giving the ball to the other team with good field position.

Downing the player with possession of the ball is one way to end a play (other ways include the player with the ball going out of bounds, an incomplete pass, or a score). Usually a player is made down when he is tackled by the defense. In the NFL, if the offensive player is touching the ground with some part of his body other than his hands or feet, then he is down if any defensive player touches him. In the NCAA, an offensive player touching the ground in the same manner is down, regardless of whether a defensive player touches him.

If recovering the ball in one's opponent's end zone (following a kickoff in American football, and following any kick into the end zone, except for successful field goals, in Canadian football), a player may down the ball by dropping to one knee (in Canadian play, doing so scores a single for the opposing team). A player in possession of the ball will down the ball if he fumbles it out of bounds. If a quarterback is running with the ball during his initial possession following the snap, he may down the ball by doing a foot-first slide, protecting him from injury. In the NFL, the quarterback is the only player for whom falling down in this way automatically stops play.

== Terminology ==
The situation at a down can be described succinctly in a short phrase of the form 1st/2nd/3rd/4th and X. The first part describes which down the offense is on, and the X is a number of yards between the current line of scrimmage and the line where the offense would gain another set of downs. Thus, offenses will normally begin on 1st and 10. If they gain 5 yards on the play, the subsequent situation would be described as 2nd and 5.

If the distance to the target line is very small, the number of yards may be replaced by and inches (e.g. 3rd and inches). Colloquially, when the target line is far from the line of scrimmage, the term "and long" may be used (e.g. 3rd and long).

When the offense has a first down within 10 yards of the goal line, the goal line becomes the line to gain as they cannot make another first down (barring a defensive penalty) without actually scoring. In these situations the number of yards is replaced with and goal, e.g. 1st and goal.

Other downs-related terminology is as follows:

- First down: The term "first down" can be used both as the first down in a series of downs, and for the statistical achievement of gaining the required ten yards to be awarded a new first down. When a team begins a new possession, (for example following a kickoff by their opponents) their first play in the ensuing series of downs will be "first down". However, it would not be recorded as a first down for statistical purposes as the offense did nothing to achieve it. Statistically they are only credited with a first down if they gain the required ten yards to be awarded a new series of downs.
- Down by contact: When a player with possession of the ball is made to touch the ground (other than hands or feet) by a defensive player. For example, if the ball-carrier slips and falls, he can get up and continue, but if he was pushed by a defensive player, he is said to be down by contact and the play is dead. This term is only applicable to professional football; in college and high-school football, the play ends when the player with possession goes down for any reason. An exception to this rule in effect at all levels of the game is that a player who is already kneeling when he takes possession of the ball is not considered down. This exception is primarily intended to ensure that the kneeling holder of a place kick attempt will not be considered to be down.
- Turnover on downs: Transfer of possession to the other team due to failure to make a new first down on the final down.
- 3rd/4th and game: Informal term referring to the late-game situation where the team with the ball is losing, and failure to convert that down will seal the outcome by being either the final play before the clock runs out, or a turnover would allow the winning team to run out the clock.
- Base downs: term in American football used to describe 1st and 2nd downs. The term is not applicable in Canadian football since there are only three downs.
- Possession downs: term in American football used to describe 3rd downs, and 4th downs used for a scrimmage play (i.e. not a punt or field goal attempt), because the offense's continued possession of the ball directly depends on the result.
- Passing down or running down: terms used in anticipation of the type of play likely to be called. On a 3rd and long in American football, for example, a pass play is often called, whereas on a 3rd down with only a few yards to the target, a running play is usually deployed. In Canadian football, the strategy employed for 2nd down is broadly similar to the strategy employed for 3rd down in American football, and 1st-and-long situations (arising as a result of penalties) may be considered passing downs similar to how 2nd-and-long situations may be considered passing downs in American football.

== Derivation ==
At the end of the 19th century, it was the rule in rugby football that if a player in possession of the ball was tackled and thus unable to advance, he would shout "Held". The tackling player would then reply "Have it down!" The tackled player was therefore down. A scrum would then begin at the spot where the tackle occurred.

In American football, the concept of the act of having the ball down gave rise to "down" as the condition of the player so obligated, and the ball carrier could call for a "down" voluntarily. Although NCAA rules have effectively abolished this (as the ball carrier dropping to the ground immediately ends the play), other codes for North American football, such as the NFL, still allow (as one way for the ball to become dead) for the runner to cry "down".

Eventually the rules officially applied the word to include all of the action from the time the ball was put into play (whether by snap or free kick) until it became dead. However, in some contexts the down begins when the ball is made ready for play by the officials.

The system of downs, in terms of a set number of plays to advance the ball a certain number of yards, was introduced by the Intercollegiate Football Association in 1882. (Then-player Walter Camp, as secretary of the rules committee, chronicled this change, but had not promoted it.) It allowed a team three downs to advance the ball five yards, or retreat with it ten yards, or else lose possession of the ball, a proposal meant to reduce sandbagging. Early in the 20th century, after the forward pass was added to the game, the required advance was doubled to ten yards, and later a fourth down was added to the series; the alternative of retreating a distance with the ball had meanwhile doubled its requirement to twenty yards and later been abolished. A system of three downs was introduced to Canadian football around 1900 in certain provincial rules, as the game had not yet been standardized nationwide.

== Two/three-and-out ==
Three and out is a situation in American football where a team, after starting an offensive possession, executes three plays, fails to get a first down, and then punts.

The term comes from the standard practice that an offensive unit only has three "real" plays before they are expected to punt. While, in theory, a team is allowed a fourth running or passing play, using the fourth down to run or pass is a risky move under most circumstances. If they fail to gain a new first down on a fourth-down play, the opposing team takes possession at the spot where they left off, giving them better field position than if the ball had been punted further toward the opposing team's end zone. Typically, a team will run or pass on fourth down only if they are trailing late in a close game, are near enough to the first down marker (usually a yard or less) and in the opposing team's territory, or in a certain part of the field where a punt will probably end up being a touchback (which will result in a relatively limited net gain of yardage), but just beyond the distance where a field goal is likely to be successful (in the NFL, a missed field goal results in the opposition taking possession at the spot of the unsuccessful kick). The range at which American football coaches will typically attempt to convert fourth downs where they otherwise would not varies between the opponent's 30- and 45-yard lines, depending on such factors as the kicker's or punter's perceived abilities and the required distance to gain.

Punting following a three-and-out is unlike a turnover on downs. Punting after a three-and-out allows a team the opportunity to set their opposition further back in field position. On a turnover on downs, there is no punt and the opposing team takes over possession of the ball at the spot of field where the final (third in the Canadian game, fourth in the American game) down ended.

In Canadian football, since there are three downs, the term "two and out" is used in this situation. In the Canadian game, single points can be scored on punts and missed field goals. As a result, Canadian football coaches will never "go for it" simply on account of the ball being on the edge of field goal range barring extraordinary circumstances (such as trailing by between four and eight points late in the game). Teams facing third and relatively long at the edge of field goal range will typically either punt (usually with the intent of putting the ball out of bounds near the opposing goal line instead of actually scoring a single point) or attempt a field goal.

== In other sports ==
In rugby league football, each team has six tackles to score a try, after a tackle the attacking team will “play the ball” to restart play (a “6 again” can be awarded with infringements at the play the ball, restarting the tackle count) while the defensive team must retreat 10 metres. Usually on the 5th tackle the attacking team will kick or punt the ball further down field (like in both American football and Canadian football) because if they fail on the 6th tackle then possession changes over to the other team. The rule was established at four tackles in 1966 and was changed to six tackles at different times in various countries (mostly Australia, New Zealand, England and France where the sport is played professionally).

== See also ==
- 1st & Ten, the graphics system used in NFL broadcast to superimpose the first down line on the field of play
- Fifth Down Game, several instances of incorrect counting of downs
- Glossary of American football
