= Philadelphia Eagles =

NFL team in Philadelphia, Pennsylvania

- Current season
Logo	Wordmark
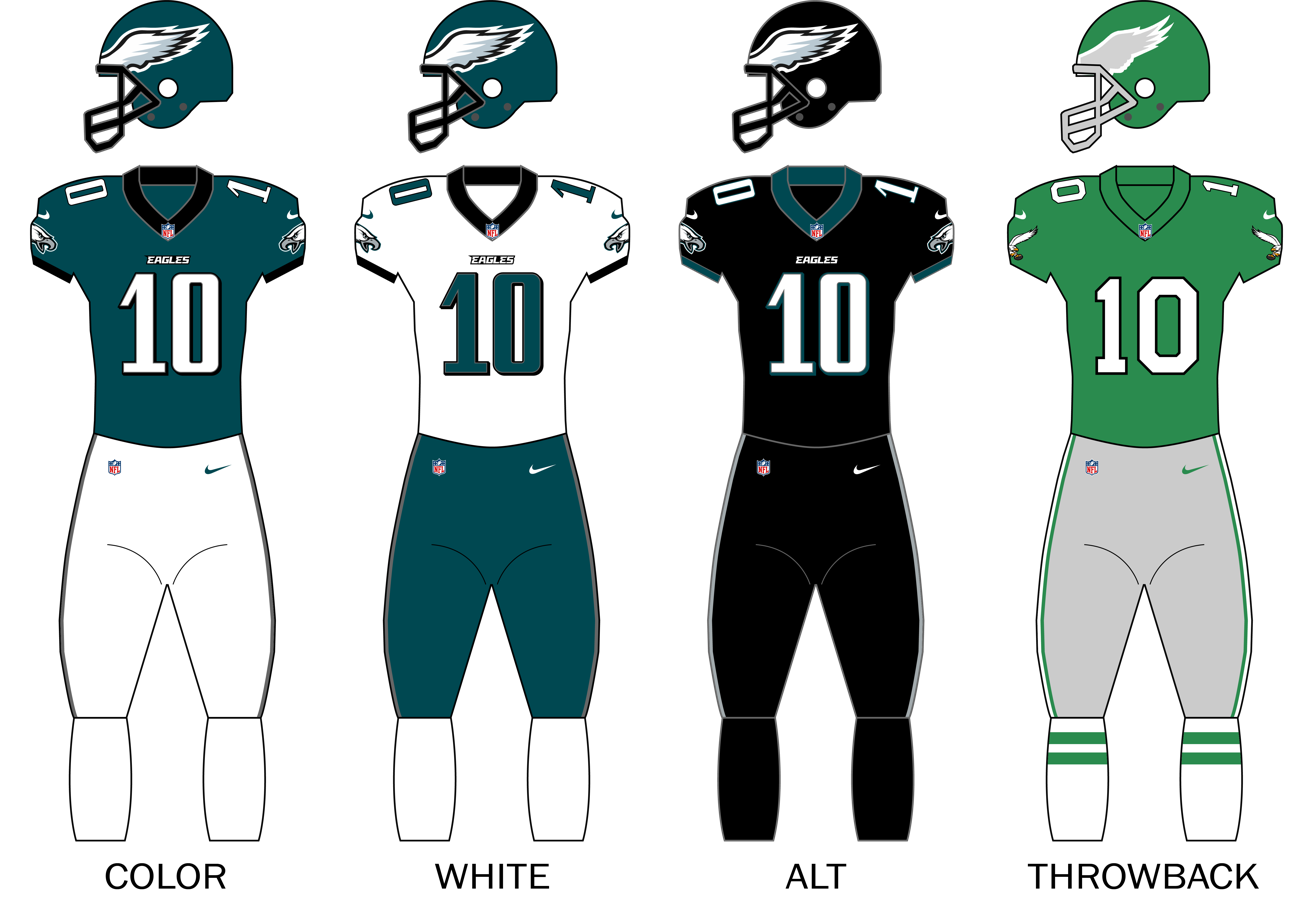
- Uniforms

General information
- Founded: July 8, 1933; 93 years ago
- Stadium: Lincoln Financial Field; Philadelphia, Pennsylvania
- Headquartered: Jefferson Health Training Complex, Philadelphia, Pennsylvania
- Colors: Midnight green, silver, black, white
- Fight song: "Fly, Eagles Fly"
- Mascot: Swoop
- Website: philadelphiaeagles.com

Personnel
- Owner: Jeffrey Lurie
- General manager: Howie Roseman
- Head coach: Nick Sirianni
- President: Don Smolenski

Nicknames
- The Birds; The Iggles

Team history
- Philadelphia Eagles (1933–1942); Phil-Pitt "Steagles" (1943); Philadelphia Eagles (1944–present)

Home fields
- Baker Bowl (1933–1935); Philadelphia Municipal Stadium (1936–1939, 1941); Shibe Park (1940, 1942–1957); Franklin Field (1958–1970); Veterans Stadium (1971–2002); Lincoln Financial Field (2003–present)

League / conference affiliations
- National Football League (1933–present): Eastern Division (1933–1949); American Conference (1950–1952); Eastern Conference (1953–1969); Capitol Division (1967–1969); National Football Conference (1970–present); NFC East (1970–present)

Championships
- League championships: 5: NFL championships (pre-1970 AFL–NFL merger) (3) 1948, 1949, 1960; Super Bowl championships: 2 2017 (LII), 2024 (LIX)
- Conference championships: 6: NFL Eastern: 1960; NFC: 1980, 2004, 2017, 2022, 2024
- Division championships: 17: NFL East: 1947, 1948, 1949; NFC East: 1980, 1988, 2001, 2002, 2003, 2004, 2006, 2010, 2013, 2017, 2019, 2022, 2024, 2025

Playoff appearances (32)
- NFL: 1947, 1948, 1949, 1960, 1978, 1979, 1980, 1981, 1988, 1989, 1990, 1992, 1995, 1996, 2000, 2001, 2002, 2003, 2004, 2006, 2008, 2009, 2010, 2013, 2017, 2018, 2019, 2021, 2022, 2023, 2024, 2025

Owners
- Bert Bell & Lud Wray (1933–1935); Bert Bell (1936–1940); Alexis Thompson (1940–1949); "Happy Hundred" (1949–1963); Jerry Wolman (1963–1969); Leonard Tose (1969–1985); Norman Braman (1985–1994); Jeffrey Lurie (1994–present)

The Philadelphia Eagles are a professional American football team based in Philadelphia. The Eagles compete in the National Football League (NFL) as a member of the National Football Conference (NFC) East division. The team plays its home games at Lincoln Financial Field in the South Philadelphia Sports Complex. The franchise was established in 1933 as a replacement for the bankrupt Frankford Yellow Jackets when a group led by Bert Bell secured the rights to an NFL franchise in Philadelphia. Since their formation, the Eagles have appeared in the playoffs 32 times, won 17 division titles (including 14 in the NFC East), appeared in four pre-merger NFL Championship Games, winning three of them (1948, 1949, and 1960), and appeared in five Super Bowls, winning Super Bowls LII and LIX.

The Philadelphia Eagles rank among the best teams in the NFL for attendance and have sold out every home game continuously since the 1999 season.

The Eagles are owned by Jeffrey Lurie, who bought the team in 1994 for $185 million. In December 2024, the Eagles became one of the first teams in the NFL to sell an ownership stake to outside investors. The deal sold 8% of the franchise at a valuation of $8.3 billion.

== History ==
=== NFL in Philadelphia (1899–1931) ===
In May 1899, the Frankford Athletic Association was organized in the parlor of the Suburban Club. The cost of purchasing a share in the association was $10. There were contributing memberships ranging from $1 to $2.50, made available to the general public. The Association was a community-based non-profit organization of local residents and businesses. In keeping with its charter, which stated that "all profits shall be donated to charity", all of the team's excess income was donated to local charitable institutions. The original Frankford Athletic Association disbanded prior to the 1909 football season. Several of the original players from the 1899 football team kept the team together, and they became known as Loyola Athletic Club. In keeping with Yellow Jackets tradition, they carried the "Frankford" name again in 1912, to become the Frankford Athletic Association.

In the early 1920s, the Frankford Athletic Association's Yellow Jackets gained a reputation as being one of the best independent football teams in the nation. In 1922, Frankford absorbed the Philadelphia City Champion team, the Union Quakers of Philadelphia. That year, Frankford captured the unofficial championship of Philadelphia. During the 1922 and 1923 seasons, the Yellow Jackets compiled a 6–2–1 record against teams from the National Football League. This led to the Association being granted an NFL franchise in 1924, thus becoming the Frankford Yellow Jackets. In spite of winning the NFL championship in 1926, midway through the 1931 season, the Yellow Jackets went bankrupt and were forced to cease operations.

=== Bell and Wray era (1933–1940) ===
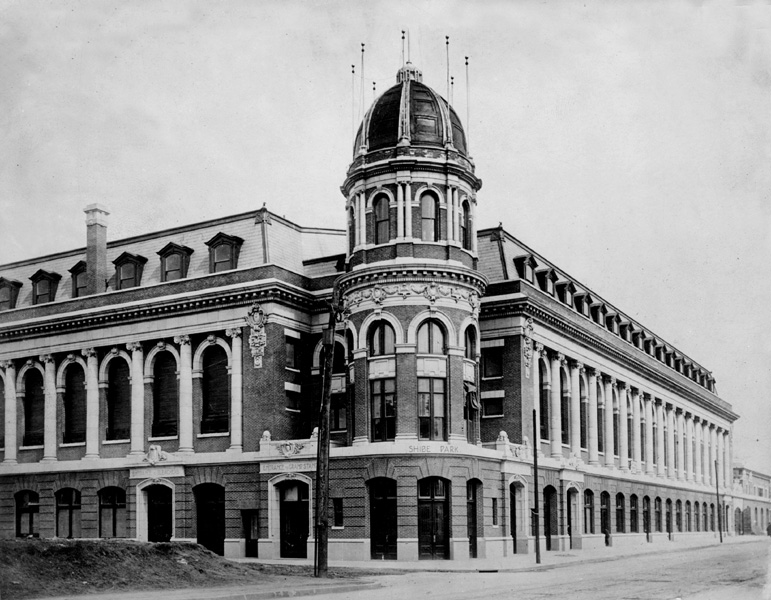
Shibe Park, the Eagles' home field, which they shared with baseball's Phillies in 1940 and then from 1942 to 1957

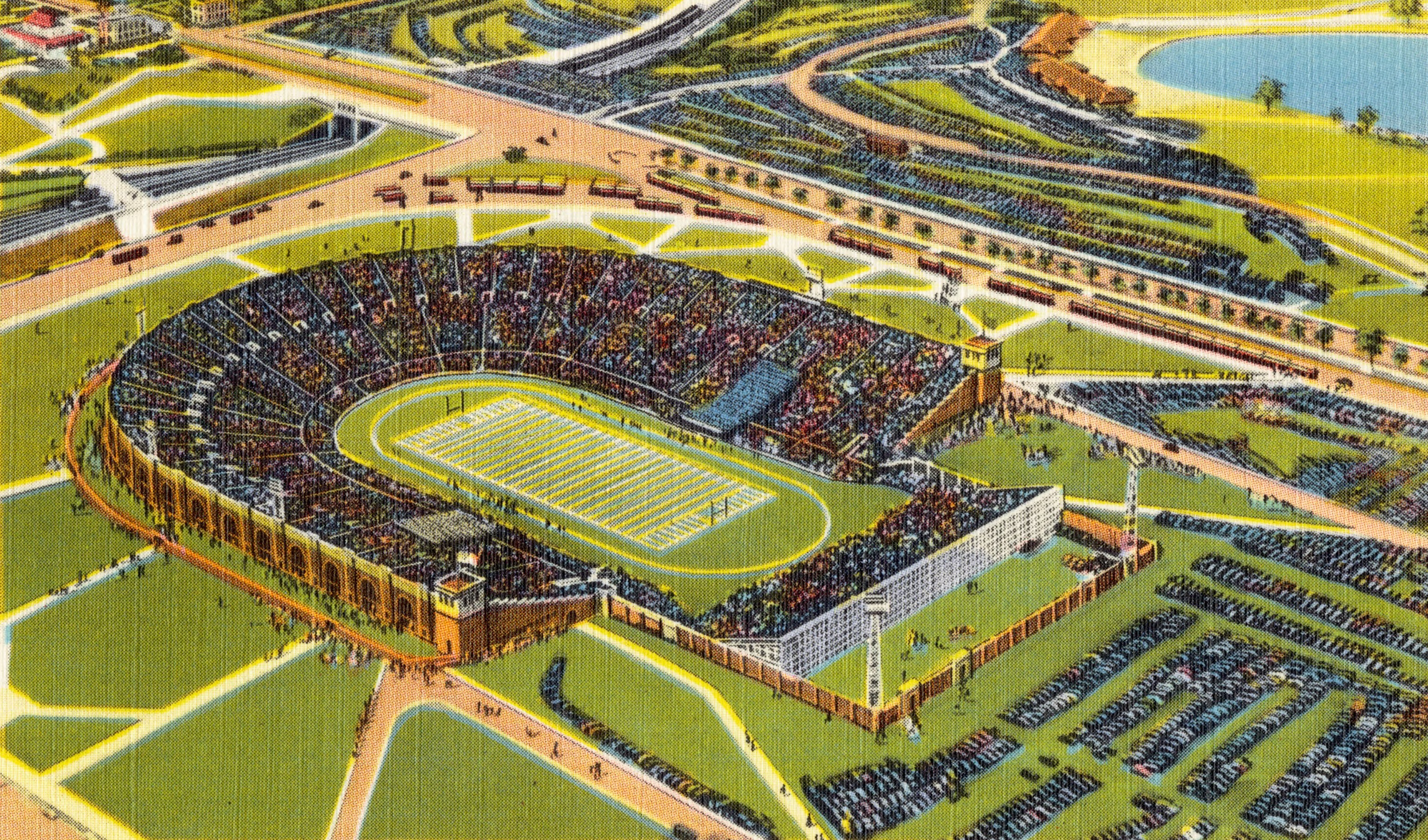
Philadelphia Municipal Stadium, the Eagles' home field from 1936 to 1939 and again in 1941

After more than a year of searching for a suitable replacement for the Yellow Jackets in the lucrative Philadelphia market, the National Football League granted an expansion franchise to an ownership group headed by Bert Bell and Lud Wray, who were also awarded the liquidated assets of the defunct Yellow Jackets organization. The Bell–Wray group had to pay an entry fee of $3,500, or roughly US$67,000 in inflation-adjusted 2022 dollars and assumed a total debt of $11,000 the Yellow Jackets owed to three other NFL franchises.

Drawing inspiration from the Blue Eagle logo of the National Recovery Administration, a centerpiece of President Franklin D. Roosevelt's New Deal policies, Bell and Wray named their new franchise the Philadelphia Eagles. While it could seem as if the Yellow Jackets simply rebranded as the Eagles, both the Eagles organization and the NFL officially regard the teams as two separate entities. There was no Philadelphia NFL team for a season and a half, and almost no players from the 1931 Yellow Jackets appeared on the Eagles' first roster.

In the 1933 NFL season, the Eagles were one of three teams, along with the Pittsburgh Pirates (now the Pittsburgh Steelers) and the now-defunct Cincinnati Reds, to join the NFL as expansion teams. Wray became the Eagles' first head coach after being persuaded to assume the position by Bell, his former teammate at Penn. The Eagles originally intended to play their home games at Shibe Park, which was the home of the Philadelphia Athletics professional baseball in Philadelphia. When negotiations for the use of Shibe Park fell through, the Eagles struck a deal with the Athletics' crosstown rival, the Philadelphia Phillies, to begin playing at the Baker Bowl.

The Eagles played their first game on October 15, 1933, against the New York Giants at the Polo Grounds in New York City, and lost the game 56–0. The Eagles struggled in their first decade, never winning more than four games in any of their first ten seasons. Their best finish was in 1934, the second season for the Eagles, when they tied for third in the East. The Eagles' early rosters largely consisted of former Penn, Temple, and Villanova players who played for the Eagles for a few years before going on to other things.

In 1935, Bell proposed an annual college draft to equalize talent across the league. The draft was a revolutionary concept in professional sports. Having teams select players in inverse order of their finish in the standings, a practice still followed today, strove to increase fan interest by guaranteeing that even the worst teams would have the opportunity for annual infusions of the best college talent. Between 1927, when the NFL changed from a sprawling Midwestern-based association to a narrower, major-market league, and 1934, three teams, the Chicago Bears, New York Giants, and Green Bay Packers, won all but one title with the exception of the Providence Steam Roller, which won in 1928. By 1936, the Eagles suffered significant financial losses and were sold through a public auction. Bert Bell was the only bidder and became the sole owner of the team. Wray refused a reduction in his salary and left the team. Bell assumed the head coaching position and led the team to a record of 1–11, last place in the league.

From 1936 to 1939, the Eagles played at Municipal Stadium in South Philadelphia. In 1940, Bell balked at a 66% rent increase plus 10% of the gate receipts proposed by the City of Philadelphia for the use of Municipal Stadium and signed a lease for Shibe Park, which was renamed Connie Mack Stadium in 1954. At Connie Mack Stadium, the Eagles were also able to play night games, since lights were installed at the stadium the year before. In the 1941 season, the Eagles played their home opener at Municipal Stadium, and then moved to Shibe Park.

To accommodate football at Shibe Park during the winter, management erected stands in right field, parallel to 20th Street. Some 20 feet high, these east stands included 22 rows of seats. The goalposts stood along the first base line and in left field. The uncovered east stands enlarged the park's capacity to over 39,000, but the Eagles rarely drew more than 25,000 to 30,000. The Eagles finished the 1937 season 2–8–1 and continued to struggle over the next three seasons.

=== Thompson, Wolman and the Happy Hundred era (1941–1969) ===
In December 1940, Bell intervened to stop the sale of Art Rooney's Steelers to Alexis Thompson. Rooney then acquired half of Bell's interest in the Eagles. In a series of events known as the Pennsylvania Polka, Rooney and Bell exchanged their entire Eagles roster and their territorial rights in Philadelphia to Thompson for his entire Steelers roster and his rights in Pittsburgh. Rooney provided assistance to Bell by rewarding him with a 20% commission on the sale of the Steelers. Bell became the Steelers' head coach and Rooney became the Steelers' general manager.

==== Greasy Neale years (1941–1950) ====
After assuming ownership, Thompson promptly hired Greasy Neale as the team's head coach. During the first years under Neale, the Eagles' struggles continued, and they finished the 1941 season with a 2–8–1 record. In the 1942 season, there was no improvement as the team finished the season 2–9.

===== Steagles (1943) =====
In 1943, with player shortages stemming from the U.S. entry engagement in World War II, it became difficult to fill the roster, and the team merged with the Steelers to form the "Phil-Pitt Combine", known as the Steagles. Greasy Neale continued to coach the team along with Steelers head coach Walt Kiesling. The team finished the 1943 season with a 5–4–1 record, and the merger, which was never intended to be a permanent arrangement, was dissolved at the season's end.

In 1944, the Eagles, led by head coach Greasy Neale and running back Steve Van Buren, had their first winning season in team history. After two second place finishes in 1945 and 1946, the team reached the NFL Championship game for the first time in 1947. Van Buren, Pete Pihos, and Bosh Pritchard fought valiantly, but the young team lost to the Chicago Cardinals, 28–21 at Comiskey Park in Chicago.

===== NFL champions (1948) =====
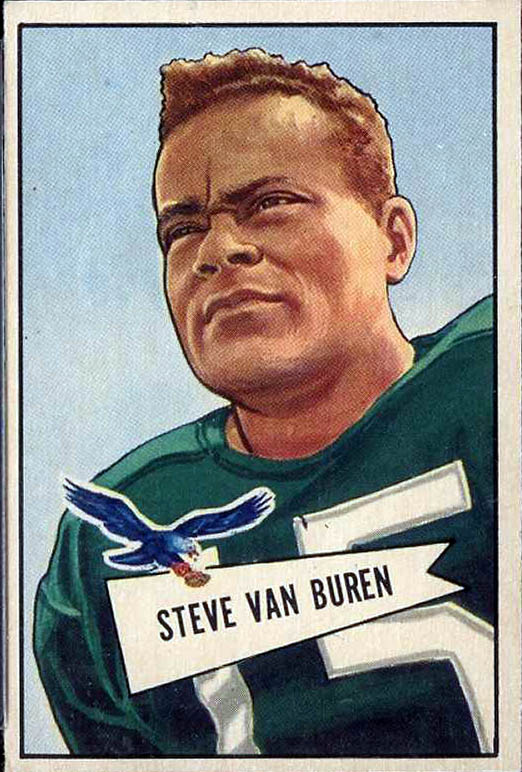
Steve Van Buren, Eagles halfback from 1944 to 1951, was inducted into the Pro Football Hall of Fame in 1965.

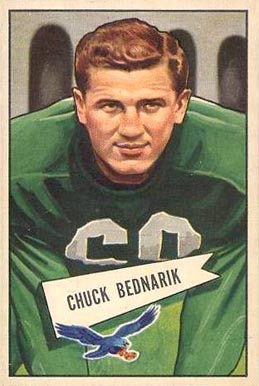
Chuck Bednarik, Eagles linebacker and center from 1949 to 1962, was inducted into Pro Football Hall of Fame in 1967. His tackle of Frank Gifford, then a running back for the New York Giants, in November 1960, is widely considered one of the hardest hits and greatest plays in NFL history

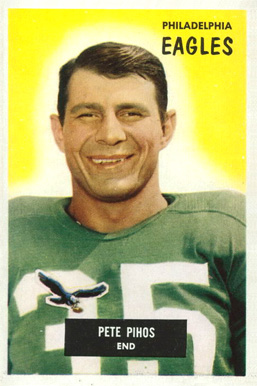
Pete Pihos, Eagles tight end from 1947 to 1955, was inducted into the Pro Football Hall of Fame in 1970.

Undeterred, the young team rebounded in 1948 to return to the NFL Championship game. With home-field advantage and a blinding snowstorm on their side, the Eagles won their first NFL Championship against the Chicago Cardinals by a score of 7–0. The only score came in the fourth quarter when Steve Van Buren ran for a five-yard touchdown. Because of the severe weather, few fans witnessed the joyous occasion.

Prior to the start of the 1949 season, the Eagles were sold by Thompson to a syndicate of 100 buyers, known as the "Happy Hundred", each of whom paid $3,000 for a share of the team. While the leader of the "Happy Hundred" was noted Philadelphia businessman James P. Clark, one unsung investor was Leonard Tose.

===== NFL champions (1949) =====
In 1949, the Eagles returned to the NFL Championship game for a third consecutive year. The Eagles were favored by a touchdown, and won 14–0 for their second consecutive title game shutout. Running back Steve Van Buren rushed for 196 yards on 31 carries for the Eagles, and their defense held the Rams to just 21 yards on the ground. Chuck Bednarik was selected as the first overall pick in the 1949 NFL draft. An All-American linebacker from the University of Pennsylvania, Bednarik would go on to become one of the greatest and most beloved players in Eagles history.

In 1950, the Eagles opened the season against the AAFC champion Cleveland Browns, who, along with two other AAFC franchises, had just joined the NFL. The Eagles were expected to make short work of the Browns, who were widely considered the dominant team in a lesser league. However, the Browns lit up the Eagles' vaunted defense for 487 total yards, including 246 passing yards, in a 35–10 rout. The Eagles never recovered from the loss and finished the 1950 season 6–6.

Following the 1950 season, Greasy Neale retired and was replaced by Bo McMillin. Two games into the 1951 season, McMillin was forced to retire following a diagnosis of terminal stomach cancer. Wayne Millner finished out the season before being replaced by Jim Trimble.

While the remnants of the great 1940s teams managed to stay competitive for the first few years of the decade, and younger players like Bobby Walston and Sonny Jurgensen occasionally provided infusions of talent, the team lacked the total talent necessary for true greatness during most of the 1950s.

After the 1957 season, the Eagles moved from Connie Mack Stadium to Franklin Field at the University of Pennsylvania. Franklin Field had a vastly expanded seating capacity for the Eagles. While Connie Mack Stadium had a capacity of 39,000, Franklin Field's capacity was 60,000. In 1969, the grass field at Franklin Field was replaced by AstroTurf, making Franklin Field the first NFL stadium to use artificial turf.

==== Buck Shaw years (1958–1960) ====
In 1958, the Eagles took several steps to improve, hiring Buck Shaw as head coach and acquiring quarterback Norm Van Brocklin in a trade with the Los Angeles Rams. During the 1959 season, the team showed flashes of talent, and finished in second place in the Eastern Division. Former Eagles owner and co-founder Bert Bell had become NFL commissioner, and attended the Eagles game on October 11 at Franklin Field against the Pittsburgh Steelers, a team Bell used to own. Bell refused the box seats that the Eagles reserved for him and purchased his own tickets to sit with the fans. During the fourth quarter, while sitting behind the end zone, Bell suffered a heart attack and died later that day.

===== NFL champions (1960) =====
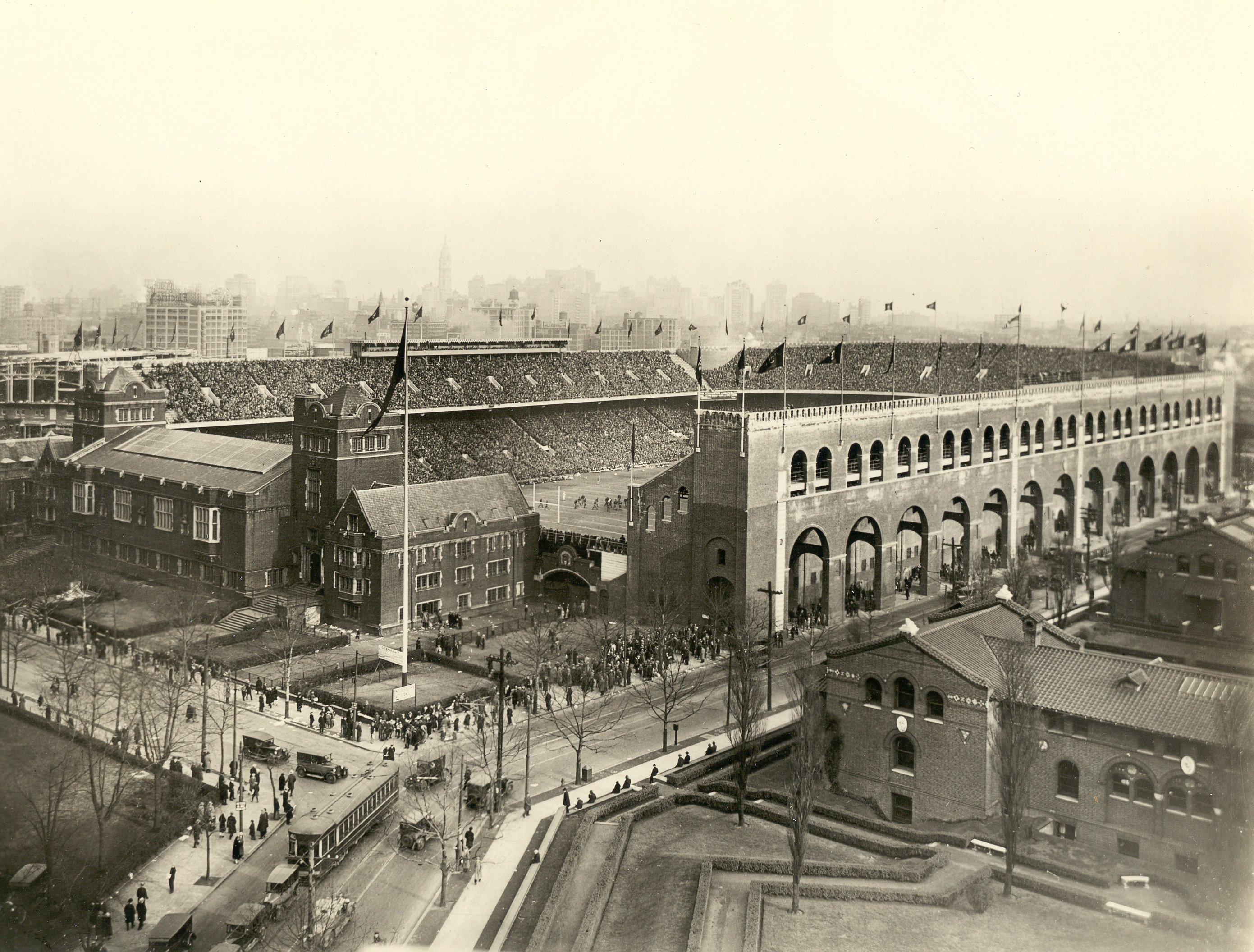
Franklin Field, the Eagles' home field from 1958 to 1970

The Eagles' 1960 season remains one of the most celebrated years in team history. Shaw, Van Brocklin, and Bednarik, each in their last season before retirement, led an Eagles team more notable for its grit than its talent. One observer later quipped that the team had "nothing but a championship" to its first division title since 1949. The team was aided by their two Pro Bowl receivers, wide receiver Tommy McDonald, who later wrote an autobiography titled They Pay Me to Catch Footballs, and tight end Pete Retzlaff.

On November 20, 1960, at Yankee Stadium in The Bronx, Bednarik launched a tackle against New York Giants' running back Frank Gifford, which has come to be known as The Hit, a tackle that is routinely ranked as one of the hardest and most vicious hits in NFL history. With the game tied 10 to 10 in the fourth quarter, Gifford caught a short pass over the middle and was immediately hit by Bednarik with a clothesline tackle so hard that it dropped Gifford to the ground unconscious. Gifford was removed from the field on a stretcher and transported to a local hospital by ambulance, where he remained for ten days. Gifford was diagnosed with a deep concussion that resulted in his retirement from the game for 18 months. On the 100th anniversary of the NFL's founding, the NFL ranked Bednarik's tackle the 44th greatest play in league history.

On December 26, 1960, one of the coldest days in recorded Philadelphia history, the Eagles faced Vince Lombardi's Green Bay Packers in the 1960 NFL Championship Game and dealt the formidable Lombardi the sole championship game loss of his storied career. Bednarik lined up at center on offense and at linebacker on defense. Fittingly, the game ended as Bednarik tackled a struggling Jim Taylor and refused to allow him to stand until the last seconds had ticked away.

Van Brocklin came to Philadelphia and agreed to play through 1960 with an understanding that, upon his retirement as a player, he would succeed Shaw as head coach. Ownership, however, opted to promote assistant coach Nick Skorich instead, and Van Brocklin quit the organization in a fit of pique, instead becoming head coach of the expansion Minnesota Vikings. Backup quarterback Sonny Jurgensen became the Eagles' starter for the 1961 season; they finished a half-game behind the New York Giants for first place in the Eastern Conference standings with a 10–4 record. Despite the success, however, the franchise was in turmoil.

The 1962 team, decimated by injury, managed only three wins and were embarrassed at home in a 49–0 loss to the Packers. The off-field chaos continued through 1963, as the 65 shareholders remaining from the original Happy Hundred sold the team to Jerry Wolman, a 36-year-old millionaire Washington developer who outbid local bidders for the team, paying an unprecedented $5.505 million for control of the club.

In 1964, Wolman hired former Cardinals and Washington Redskins coach Joe Kuharich to a 15-year contract. Over the next five seasons, the team failed to make the playoffs and the failures of the team over this period were highlighted by the Santa Claus incident, when fans pelted a Santa Claus with snowballs during a halftime Christmas pageant. The team had only one winning season, in 1966, finishing second in the NFL Eastern Conference. The Eagles lost to the Baltimore Colts 20–14, in the post-season's third place consolation game, the Playoff Bowl, which was held at the Orange Bowl in Miami. The Eagles finished 6–7–1 in 1967. In the following season, the Eagles fell even further in the standings, recording a 2–12 record in 1968.

=== Leonard Tose era (1969–1984) ===
Veterans Stadium in South Philadelphia, the Eagles' home field from 1971 to 2002, which they shared with baseball's Phillies

In 1969, Leonard Tose bought the team from Wolman for $16.155 million, the equivalent of $142 million today, representing a record then for the highest amount ever paid for a professional sports franchise. Tose's first official act was to fire Coach Joe Kuharich after a disappointing 24–41–1 record during his five-year reign. Tose then named former Eagles wide receiver Pete Retzlaff as the team's general manager and Jerry Williams as its new head coach.

With the merger of the NFL and AFL in 1970, the Eagles were placed in the NFC East Division with the New York Giants, Washington Redskins, and Dallas Cowboys. The Eagles' heated rivalry with the Giants is the oldest of the NFC East rivalries, dating back to 1933, and is often cited as one of the best rivalries in the NFL. 1970 was also the last season for the Eagles at Franklin Field; the team finished the first post-merger season in last place in their division at 3–10–1.

In 1971, the Eagles moved to Veterans Stadium, which had just been constructed and was initially acclaimed as a triumph of ultra-modern sports engineering. After a 3–10–1 record in 1970 and three consecutive blowout losses to Cincinnati, Dallas, and San Francisco to open the 1971 season, Williams was fired and replaced by assistant coach Ed Khayat, a defensive lineman on the Eagles' 1960 NFL championship team. Williams and Khayat were hampered by Retzlaff's decision to trade longtime starting quarterback Norm Snead to the Minnesota Vikings in early 1971, leaving the Eagles a choice between journeyman Pete Liske and raw Rick Arrington. Khayat lost his first two games but won six of the season's last nine, thanks largely to the efforts of the Eagles' defense, led by all-pro safety Bill Bradley, who led the NFL in interceptions (11) and interception return yardage (248).

The team regressed in 1972 to finish 2–11–1, and Khayat was released. The two wins, both on the road, proved to be surprises. Philadelphia beat the Kansas City Chiefs (which had had the best record in the AFC a year before) 21–20 and the Houston Oilers 18–17 on six field goals by kicker Tom Dempsey. The latter game had been called the "Johnny Rodgers Bowl", because the loser, in finishing last in the league, would gain the first overall pick in the 1973 NFL draft, which was then presumed to be Nebraska wingback Johnny Rodgers, the Heisman Trophy winner. With their loss, the Oilers got first pick and took University of Tampa defensive end John Matuszak, who later faced Philadelphia in Super Bowl XV. With the second overall pick, the Eagles selected USC tight end Charle Young.

Khayat was replaced by offensive guru Mike McCormack for the 1973 season. Aided by the skills of quarterback Roman Gabriel and towering young wide receiver Harold Carmichael, they managed to infuse a bit of vitality into a previously moribund offense.

New general manager Jim Murray also began to add talent on the defensive side of the line, most notably through the addition of future Pro Bowl linebacker Bill Bergey in 1974. Overall, however, the team was still mired in mediocrity. McCormack was fired after a 4–10 1975 season.

==== Dick Vermeil years (1976–1982) ====
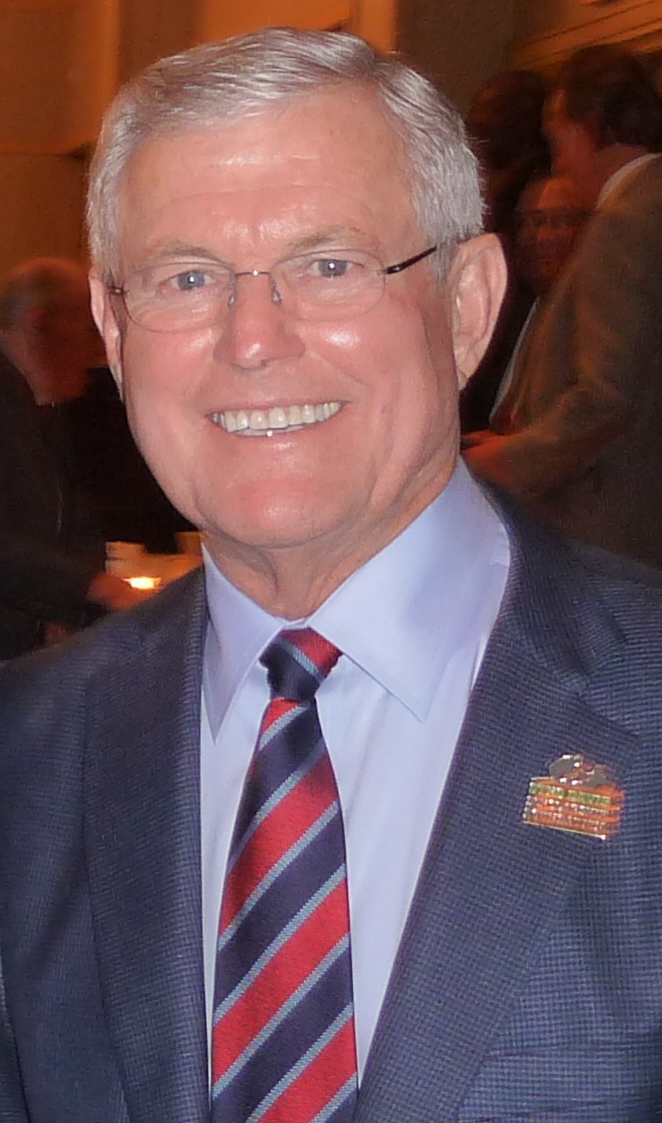
Dick Vermeil, Eagles head coach from 1976 to 1982, who led the Eagles to their first Super Bowl appearance in Super Bowl XV against the Oakland Raiders in 1981

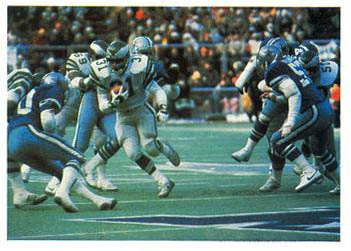
Wilbert Montgomery, Eagles running back from 1977 to 1984, in the 1980 NFC Championship Game against the Dallas Cowboys at Veterans Stadium

In 1976, Dick Vermeil was hired from UCLA to coach the struggling Eagles, who had managed only one winning season from 1962 to 1975. Vermeil faced numerous obstacles as he attempted to rejuvenate a franchise that had not seriously contended in well over a decade. Despite the team's young talent and Gabriel's occasional flashes of brilliance, the Eagles finished 1976 with the same 4–10 record as in 1975. In 1977, the first seeds of hope began to emerge. The team obtained hard-throwing quarterback Ron Jaworski in a trade from the Los Angeles Rams in exchange for popular tight end Charle Young. The defense, led by Bergey and defensive coordinator Marion Campbell, began earning a reputation as one of the hardest-hitting in the league.

1978 saw one of the great moments in Eagles history, The Miracle at the Meadowlands, when Herman Edwards returned a fumble by Giants' quarterback Joe Pisarcik for a touchdown with 20 seconds left in the game, resulting in a 19–17 Eagles victory. The Eagles would edge into the playoffs with a 9–7 season. Young running back Wilbert Montgomery became the first Eagle since Steve Van Buren to exceed 1,000 yards in a season. In 1979, the Eagles tied for first place with an 11–5 record, as Montgomery shattered team rushing records with a total of 1,512 yards.

In 1980, the team dominated the NFC, facing its chief nemesis, the Dallas Cowboys, in the NFC Championship Game. The game was played in cold conditions before faithful fans at Veterans Stadium. Led by an outstanding rushing performance by Montgomery, whose long cutback TD run in the first half is one of the most memorable in Eagles history, and a gutsy game from fullback Leroy Harris, who scored the Eagles' only other TD that day, the Birds earned a berth in Super Bowl XV with a 20–7 victory.

The Eagles traveled to New Orleans for Super Bowl XV, where they were heavily favored over the Oakland Raiders, who had squeaked into the playoffs as a wild-card team. Things did not go the Eagles' way, beginning with Tose's imprudent decision to bring comedian Don Rickles into the pregame locker room to lighten the mood. Jaworski's first pass was intercepted by Rod Martin, setting up an Oakland touchdown. Later in the first quarter, a potential game-tying 40-yard touchdown pass to Rodney Parker was nullified by an illegal-motion penalty. The final score was 27–10. Journeyman quarterback Jim Plunkett was named the game's MVP.

The team got off to a promising start in the 1981 season by winning their first six games. They ended up 10–6 to earn a wild-card berth. However, their hopes to repeat as NFC champs were dashed in the wild-card round by the New York Giants, who won 27–21.

After the Eagles finished 3–6 in the strike-shortened 1982 season, Vermeil quit the team, citing "burnout".

Defensive coordinator Marion Campbell replaced Vermeil as head coach. Campbell had helped to popularize the "bend-don't-break" defensive strategy in the 1970s. Philadelphia struggled through the mid-1980s, marked by flagging fan participation. The team failed to make the playoffs in 1983 and 1984. The team nearly moved to Phoenix, Arizona at the end of the 1984 season.

=== Norman Braman era (1985–1993) ===
In 1985, Tose was forced to sell the Eagles to Norman Braman and Ed Leibowitz, highly successful automobile dealers from Florida, for a reported $65 million (equal to $195 million today) to pay off his more than $25 million ($75 million today) in gambling debts at Atlantic City casinos. The team again struggled during the 1985 season, and Campbell was fired after week 16, to be replaced by assistant head coach/defensive backs coach Fred Bruney for the season's last game.

In the 1985 Supplemental draft, the Eagles acquired the rights to the Memphis Showboats' elite pass rusher Reggie White.

==== Buddy Ryan years (1986–1990) ====
Jerome Brown, Eagles defensive end from 1987 to 1991, was named to the 1990 and 1991 Pro Bowl teams before dying in a tragic car accident in June 1992 at age 27.

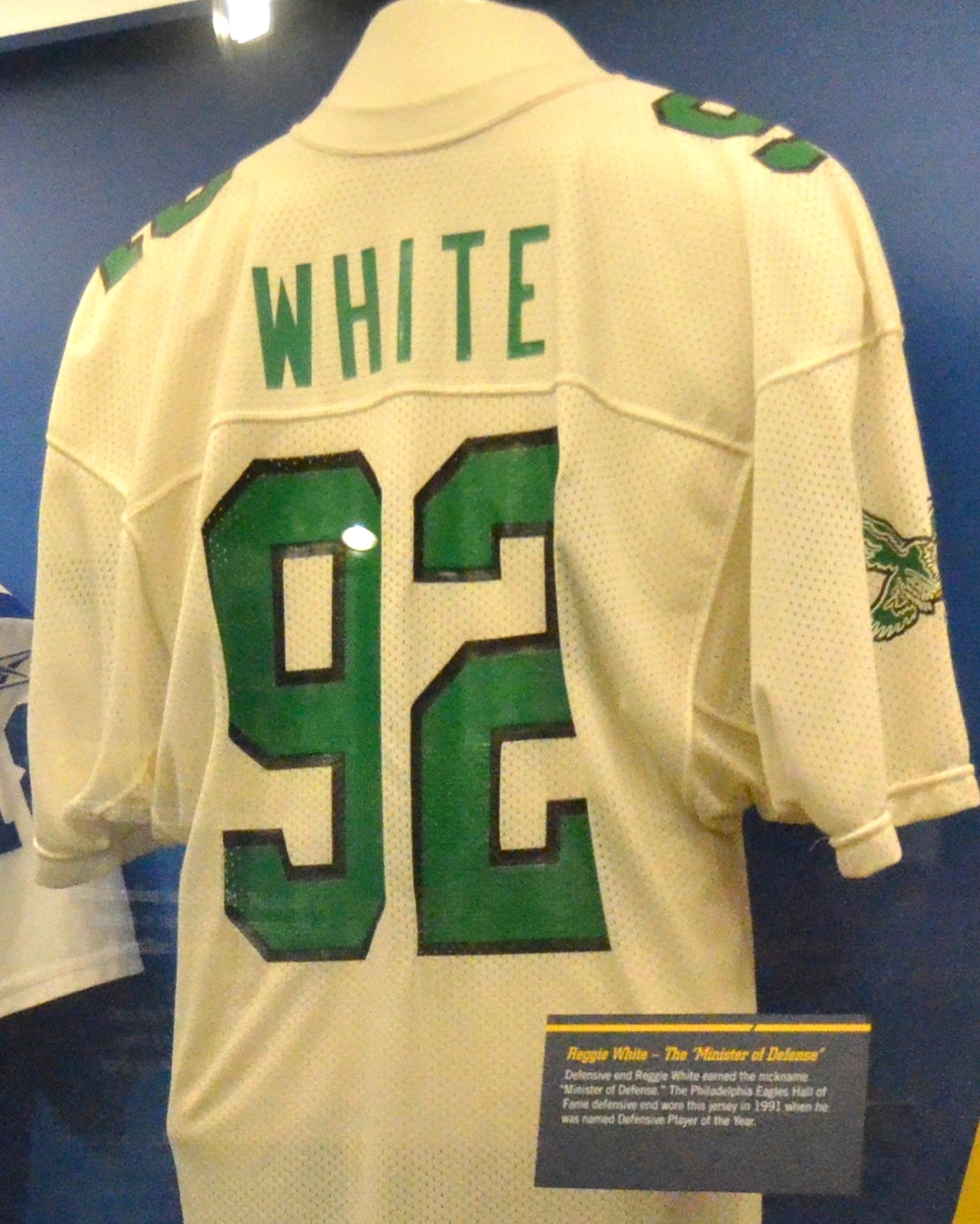
Reggie White's Eagles jersey on display at the Pro Football Hall of Fame in Canton, Ohio

In 1986, the arrival of head coach Buddy Ryan and his fiery attitude sparked team performance and ignited the fan base. Immediately infusing the team with his hard-as-nails attitude, the Eagles quickly became known for their tough defense and tougher attitudes. Ryan began rejuvenating the team by releasing several aging players, including Ron Jaworski. Randall Cunningham took his place and, despite a 5–10–1 season, began showing considerable promise. 1987 saw another strike, which shortened the season by one game. The substitutes who had filled in for the strikers performed poorly and were crushed 41–22 by the Dallas Cowboys. After the strike, the regular Eagles' 1987 team won a 37–20 revenge game against Dallas. The season record was 7–8, of which three games had been played by substitutes.

The Eagles reached the playoffs in 1988, but lost to the Chicago Bears, the team that Ryan had helped lead to a Super Bowl XX victory as defensive coordinator. The game became known as the "Fog Bowl", due to the inclement weather during the game. The Eagles lost, 20–12.

The following two years would see playoff appearances as well, but the team never made it past the first round. This failure was very frustrating to Eagles fans, as the team was widely regarded as among the most talented in the NFL. On offense, the Eagles were led by quarterback Cunningham, one of the most exciting players of his generation; tight end Keith Jackson; and fullback Keith Byars. The defense is commonly acknowledged as among the greatest in league history, and as the best to never win a championship.

The two 1989 matches with Dallas were known as the Bounty Bowls. Both were won easily by the Eagles (the Cowboys finished 1–15 that year), and were marked by Ryan insulting new Cowboys coach Jimmy Johnson by placing a bounty on their kicker, and by Eagles fans throwing snowballs at him at Veterans Stadium. On November 12, 1990, during a Monday Night Football game at the Vet, the Eagles defeated the Washington Redskins by a score of 28–14, as the defense scored three of the team's four touchdowns. This game, more lopsided than its score would indicate, was subsequently labeled the Body Bag Game in reference to the number of injuries Eagles players inflicted on the Redskins and the physically tough play of the Eagles in the game. In the game, the Eagles knocked out the starting Washington quarterback, and then seriously injured his replacement. Running back Brian Mitchell, who would later be signed by the Eagles, was called upon to finish the game as the Redskins' quarterback. Washington returned to Philadelphia in the first round of the playoffs to defeat the Eagles 20–6, ending their season.

Ryan was fired on January 7, 1991, and was replaced by offensive coordinator Rich Kotite. The team started the 1991 season with the loss of starting quarterback Randall Cunningham due to a knee injury. Backup quarterback Jim McMahon assumed the starting role for the rest of the season. Despite having the top-rated defense in the league, the team failed to make the playoffs by finishing third in the NFC East with a record of 10–6.

On June 25, 1992, All Pro defensive tackle Jerome Brown was killed in an automobile accident. The team and fan base dedicated the 1992 season to "bring it home for Jerome". The team finished second in the NFC East with an 11–5 record to earn a wild card playoff spot. Kotite led the Eagles to a victory over the New Orleans Saints in the wild card game but then fell to the Dallas Cowboys in the Divisional round. Another blow to the team was the loss of all-time sacks leader Reggie White to free agency in the off-season.

Among the team's offensive stars during that period were quarterback Randall Cunningham, tight end Keith Jackson, and running back Herschel Walker. But what was known as the Gang Green defense, led by Reggie White, Jerome Brown, Clyde Simmons, Seth Joyner, Wes Hopkins, Mike Golic, Byron Evans, Eric Allen, Andre Waters, and Mark McMillian, defined the team. In 1993, Kotite's Eagles fell apart after a promising start and miss the playoffs, ending the regular season 8–8.

=== Jeffrey Lurie era (1994–present) ===
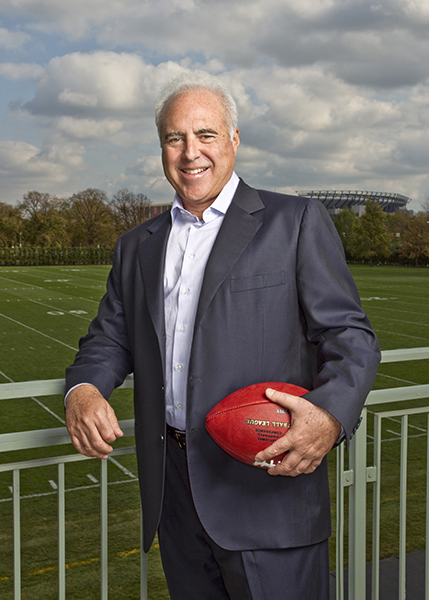
Jeffrey Lurie in 2010

By 1994, team owner Norman Braman had become largely unpopular among local fans and a polarizing presence in the front office. Jeffrey Lurie bought the Eagles on May 6, 1994, for an estimated $185 million.

In Lurie's first season as owner in 1994, the team went 7–9 and again missed the playoffs. Rich Kotite was fired and replaced by San Francisco 49ers defensive coordinator Ray Rhodes, who successfully lured 49ers star Ricky Watters to join the team as a free agent.

In 1995, Rhodes's first season, the Eagles got off to a slow start by losing three of their first four games but subsequently rebounded to finish with a 10–6 record and a playoff spot. In the Wild Card Round, the Eagles, playing at home, overwhelmed the Detroit Lions 58–37, with 31 of Philadelphia's points coming in the second quarter. However, the Eagles were again eliminated in the next round by the Cowboys by a score of 30–11. This would be Randall Cunningham's last game as an Eagle. Cunningham scored the only touchdown of the game and the last Eagles postseason touchdown for six years.

1995 marked the end of Cunningham's tenure as starting quarterback. Rhodes benched Cunningham in favor of Rodney Peete, leading to friction between the two. Earlier, rumors had circulated that Lurie and Rhodes had tried to trade Cunningham to the Arizona Cardinals. However, no such trade materialized and Cunningham retired shortly after the season.

In 1996, the Eagles' uniform colors were changed from the classic kelly green to a darker midnight green. The team got off to a good start, winning three of their first four games. However, a week 5 Monday night game at Veterans Stadium against the rival Cowboys witnessed a season ending knee injury to Peete, loss of the team's momentum, and the transition to an offense led by Ty Detmer and Watters. While Detmer played well and Watters rushed for 1,411 yards, the season conformed to what had become a familiar pattern: 10–6 record and early elimination (a 14–0 shutout by the 49ers) in the playoffs.

In the 1996 NFL draft, Brian Dawkins was chosen in the second round. The continued early playoff exits led fans and local media to cast blame on high-priced free agents (Irving Fryar, Watters, Troy Vincent, and Guy McIntyre) for not stepping up in big games, especially in the postseason. Rhodes gradually deteriorated under the stress of the job, and players were beginning to grow tired of his brash demeanor and often autocratic coaching style.

After a 6–9–1 campaign in 1997, the bottom fell out in 1998. The Eagles suffered a 3–13 record, their worst since 1972, and were ranked dead last in numerous offensive statistics. Home attendance was declining, a quarterback controversy was deteriorating an already rudderless locker room, and the players had all but tuned out the embattled coaching staff. Left with little choice after a disastrous season, fan revolt, and sagging team morale, Lurie fired Rhodes and hired Green Bay Packers quarterback coach Andy Reid as head coach.

==== Andy Reid years (1999–2012) ====
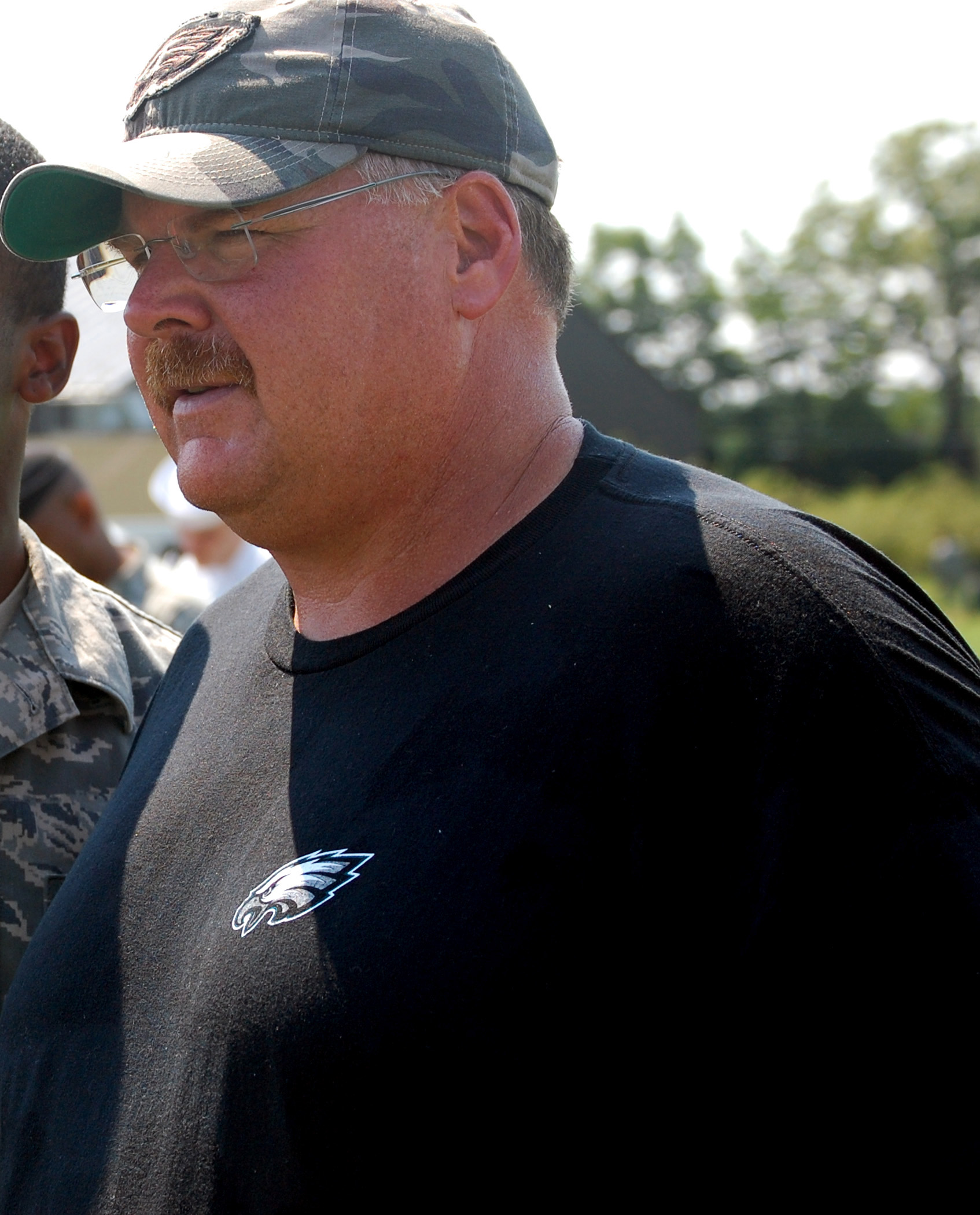
Andy Reid, Eagles head coach from 1999 to 2012, led the Eagles to Super Bowl XXXIX against the New England Patriots in 2004.

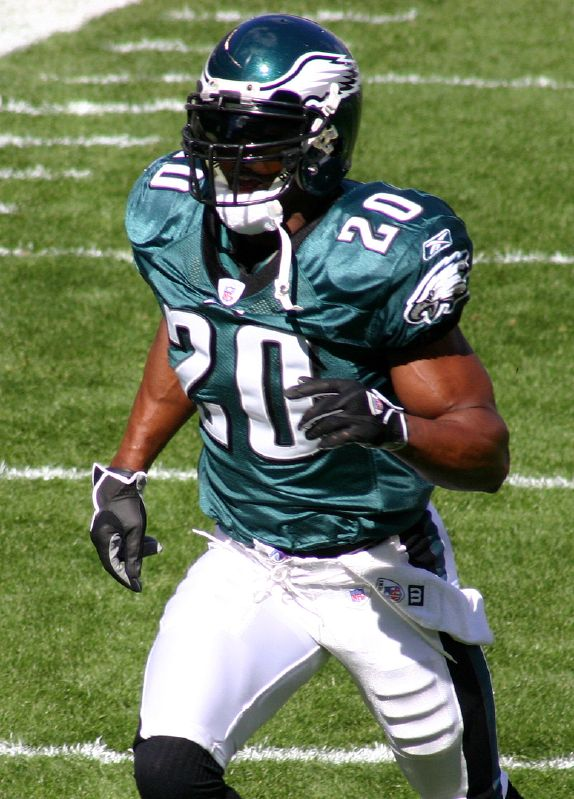
Brian Dawkins, Eagles safety from 1996 to 2008, was inducted into the Pro Football Hall of Fame in 2018

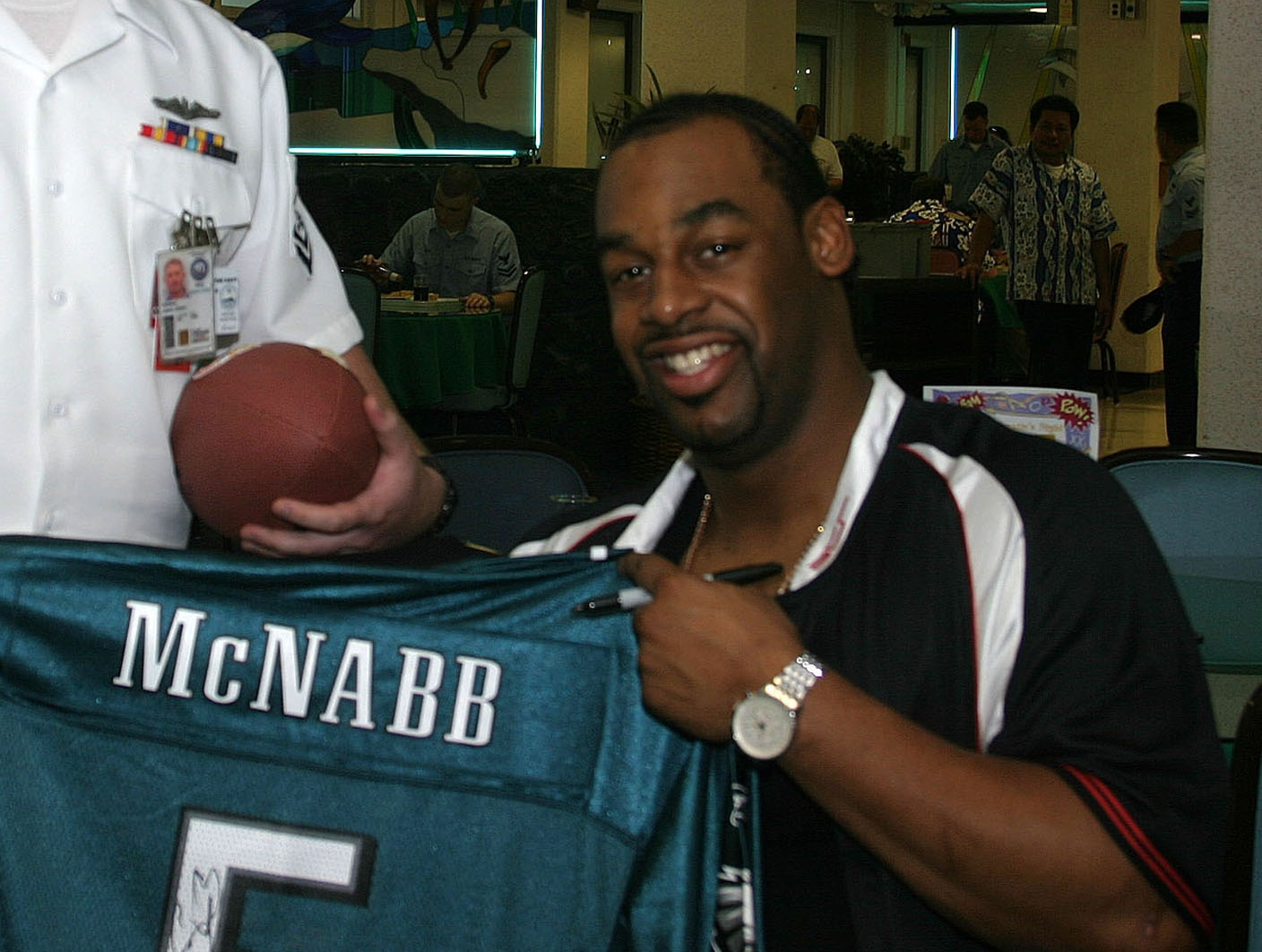
Donovan McNabb, Eagles quarterback from 1999 to 2009 and Andy Reid's first draft selection as Eagles head coach in the 1999 NFL draft

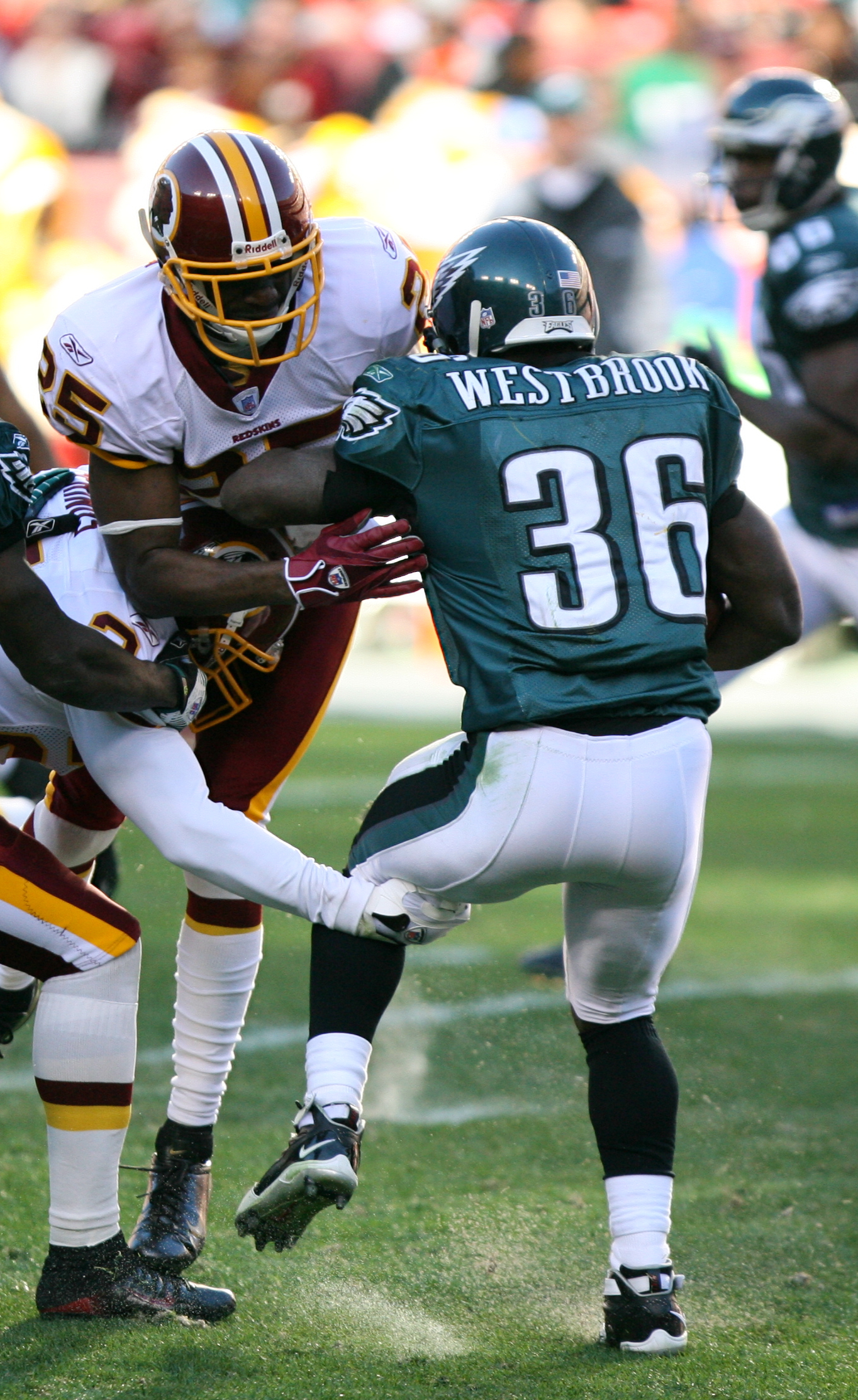
Brian Westbrook, Eagles Running Back from 2002 to 2009, and inducted into the Eagles Hall of Fame in 2015.

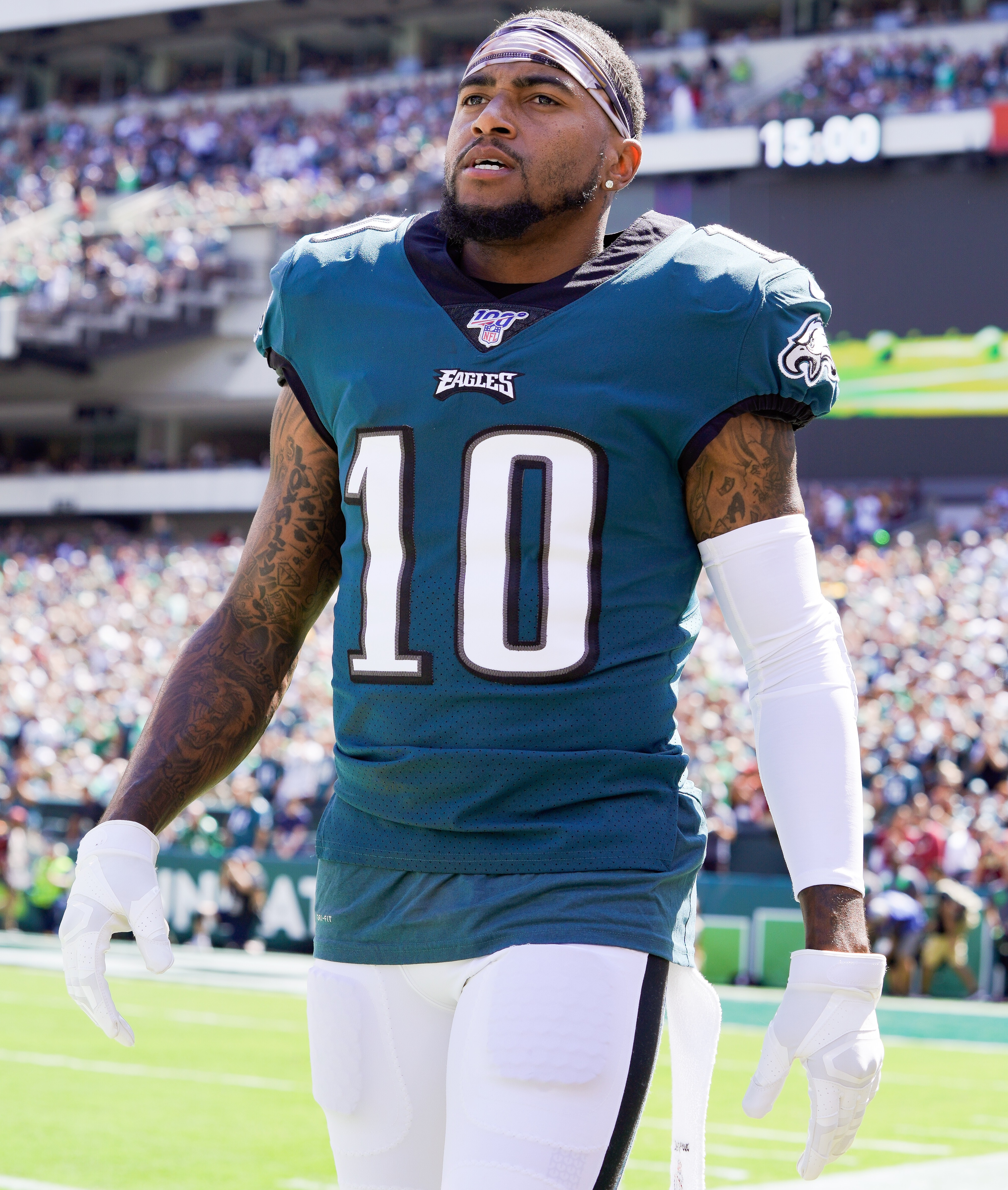
DeSean Jackson played for the Eagles from 2008 to 2013 and then again from 2019 to 2020; his December 19, 2010, punt return against the New York Giants, known as the Miracle at the New Meadowlands, is considered one of the greatest plays in NFL history.

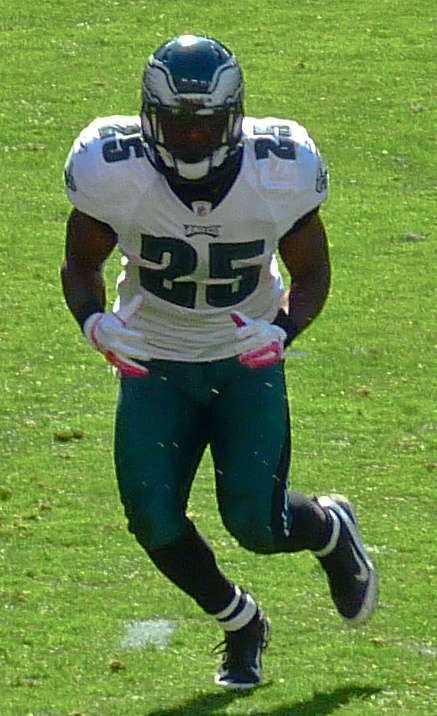
LeSean McCoy, Eagles running back from 2009 to 2014

The Eagles reemerged as a predominant NFL team under the leadership of new head coach Andy Reid, who was hired away from the Green Bay Packers, where he was the Packers' quarterback coach. Reid's first notable step was drafting Syracuse quarterback Donovan McNabb with the second overall pick in the 1999 NFL draft. The Eagles' awful 1998 season would have entitled the Eagles to first pick, but it was awarded to the rebooted Cleveland Browns.

Despite clearing the roster for new talent by releasing unpopular and aging veterans such as Ricky Watters and Irving Fryar, Reid was still a virtual unknown before his arrival as head coach, and his appointment was met initially with skepticism among Philadelphia fans. The drafting of McNabb was unpopular with many Eagles fans, many of whom traveled to Madison Square Garden for the 1999 Draft and booed the selection, believing the Eagles instead should have selected Ricky Williams, a University of Texas running back who had been named the 1998 AP College Player of the Year.

The 1999 season was largely a rebuilding year for the Eagles. The team, which routinely sells out its home games in Philadelphia, had two 1999 home games that failed to sell out, resulting in local TV blackouts. Another six home games in the 1999 season sold out only because several local small business owners bought the remaining unsold tickets to spare Philadelphia-area viewers a television blackout of the game.

The Week 5 home game at Veterans Stadium on October 10, 1999, against the Dallas Cowboys represented the last play of Cowboys wide receiver Michael Irvin's career. In the game, Irvin was driven into the turf by Eagles safety Tim Hauck, which left Irvin lying motionless. Some Eagles fans responded with applause, giving further rise to Philadelphia's reputation as unduly aggressive and hostile fans. Irvin was transported from the field by stretcher and then by ambulance to Thomas Jefferson University Hospital. Irvin, who was diagnosed with a potentially threatening cervical spine injury and forced to announce his NFL retirement after the injury, later said the Philadelphia fans were applauding his departure rather than his serious injury. The team finished the season with a record of 5–11.

The 2000 regular-season opener in Dallas on September 3 became known in NFL lore as the "Pickle Juice Game". Kickoff temperature in Texas Stadium was 109 degrees Fahrenheit and soared to nearly 120, making it the hottest game in league history, beating a previous record set in a 1997 Cowboys–Cardinals match in Arizona. The nickname came about because an Eagles trainer had prepared for the predicted heat by having the players drink the juice from jars of dill pickles in order to retain body moisture and stave off cramps and heat exhaustion. The experiment proved successful as the Eagles won 41–14 while multiple Cowboys players had been consigned to the bench, unable to handle the torrid climate while the Eagles had no players benched.

The game was also significant as marking the beginning of Philadelphia's domination of the NFC East. The team finished the season at 11–5, reaching the playoffs as a wild card, which restored fan optimism. After brushing aside the Tampa Bay Buccaneers 21–3, the Eagles moved to the second round of the playoffs, only to lose 20–10 to the New York Giants. After compiling an 11–5 record in 2001, the Eagles reached the playoffs again, this time at the top of their division. In a near rerun of the previous year, they disposed of the Buccaneers in a 31–9 game. In the second round, the Eagles defeated the Bears 33–19 at Soldier Field. In the NFC Championship game, they were unable to stop the St. Louis Rams, who defeated them 29–24.

Despite injuries, McNabb led the Eagles to a 12–4 season in 2002. Once again, they reached the NFC Championship game, but lost at home 27–10 to the eventual Super Bowl champion Tampa Bay Buccaneers in the last game at Veterans Stadium.

In the opening game of the 2003 season, the Eagles were shut out 17–0 by the Tampa Bay Buccaneers in the first regular season game ever played at their new home, Lincoln Financial Field. Once again, the team went 12–4 for the season and then reached the conference championship game. In doing so, the Eagles became the first team in modern history to get that far in the postseason after having been shut out at home in its first game. They achieved that distinction despite getting only five touchdown receptions all year by their wide receivers, which tied the league-low since the regular-season schedule was lengthened to its present 16 games in 1978. This record was broken in 2004 when the New York Giants' wide receivers caught only two touchdown passes.

The Eagle receivers went through both September and October without a TD catch; the last time an NFL team had done that was in 1945. In the Divisional Round of the playoffs, the Eagles beat the Green Bay Packers 20–17 in overtime thanks in part to a late-game completion from McNabb to Freddie Mitchell on an iconic play that has come to be known as 4th and 26. They lost the NFC Championship game to the Carolina Panthers 14–3. Panthers cornerback Ricky Manning Jr. had three interceptions in the game.

The Eagles actively pursued premier wide receiver Terrell Owens, and acquired him in a controversial three-way deal with the Baltimore Ravens and the San Francisco 49ers, on March 16, 2004. The 2004 season began with a bang as Owens caught three touchdown passes from McNabb in their season opener against the New York Giants. Owens ended up with exactly 1,200 receiving yards and 14 touchdown receptions, although his season ended prematurely with an ankle injury in a December 19 game against the Dallas Cowboys. The Eagles' 12–7 victory in this game gave them home-field advantage throughout the conference playoffs for the third year in a row. The Eagles tied a record by clinching the NFC East division crown (their fourth straight) after only their eleventh game of the season, matching the mark set by the 1985 Chicago Bears and the 1997 San Francisco 49ers. Their final two regular season games thus rendered meaningless, the Eagles sat out most of their first-string players in these games and lost both, yet still finished the season with a 13–3 record. McNabb had his best season to date, passing for 3,875 yards and 31 touchdowns, with only eight interceptions. This made him the first quarterback in NFL history to throw 30 or more TD passes and fewer than 10 interceptions in a single regular season. They then began their playoff run with the Divisional round at home against the sixth-seeded Minnesota Vikings. The Eagles led from the start and never looked back, as McNabb led a very efficient passing attack (21 of 33 for 286 yards and 2 TDs), Brian Westbrook dominated on the ground with 70 rushing yards, and Freddie Mitchell performed very well on the receiving corps (5 receptions for 65 yards and a TD), as Philadelphia won 27–14, setting up their fourth-straight NFC Championship appearance. Facing the Atlanta Falcons, McNabb threw for 180 yards and two touchdowns, while also rushing for 32 yards. Westbrook rushed for 96 yards and caught five passes for 39. Winning the game 27–10, the Eagles advanced to Super Bowl XXXIX, where they faced the New England Patriots. Although McNabb threw 3 touchdown passes and 357 yards in the game, and the score was tied 14–14 going into the fourth quarter, the Patriots outscored the Eagles with ten straight points. McNabb completed a 30-yard touchdown pass, and the Eagles defense held the Patriots to a 3 and out, but a crucial interception with 46 seconds left sealed their fate, as the Patriots won 24–21.

The team took a step back in 2005 with a 6–10 record, failing to make the playoffs for the first time since the 1999 season. McNabb had played with a sports hernia and a broken thumb, starting 4–2 then losing three in a row, before he finally succumbed to injury and missed the rest of the season. For obnoxious behavior and a feud with McNabb, Owens was suspended after 7 games and was eventually cut.

In 2006, the team lost McNabb 10 games in and went into turmoil. However, Westbrook stepped up, and the Eagles earned their fifth NFC East title under coach Reid, with a 10–6 record. They won the Wild Card game against the New York Giants, but lost in the Divisional Round to the New Orleans Saints. The 2007 season would end with the Eagles finishing 8–8 and failing to make the playoffs for the second time in three seasons. However, in 2008, the team finished the season with a 9–6–1 record, making the playoffs with a wild card berth, The team upset the Minnesota Vikings in the first round, winning the game 26–14. The team then went on to defeat the defending Super Bowl champion New York Giants 23–11 en route to their sixth NFC Championship Game. In the NFC Championship game, the Eagles rallied from down 24–6 at halftime to up 25–24 in the fourth quarter, but they lost to the Arizona Cardinals by a score of 32–25 after quarterback Kurt Warner scored a touchdown with just under three minutes remaining in regulation.

Entering the 2009 season, the Eagles signed quarterback Michael Vick. On December 6, 2009, Andy Reid became only the fifth coach in NFL history to win 100 or more games with a single team in a single decade (the other four are Tom Landry, Don Shula, Tony Dungy, and Bill Belichick). McNabb finally had a complete receiving corps, between first-round draft pick Jeremy Maclin, DeSean Jackson's 1,000-yard season, and Brent Celek ranking among the top 5 tight ends in the league. Without Brian Dawkins, defensive end Trent Cole stepped up and became the dominant force on defense with 12 sacks, earning him his second trip to the Pro Bowl and All-Pro honors. In 2009, the Eagles started 5–4, then won six straight. After a shutout by the Dallas Cowboys in week 17, the Eagles failed to secure a first round bye, and with a record of 11–5, they were the NFC's sixth seed. In their January 2009 wild card game, the Eagles played against their divisional foes for the second consecutive week, losing 34–14 to hand Dallas their first playoff win since December 1996.

On January 11, 2010, General Manager Tom Heckert, Jr. was hired away by the Cleveland Browns; he was replaced by Howie Roseman, who was promoted from Vice President of Player Personnel. On March 5, 2010, Brian Westbrook was cut from the Eagles after eight seasons with the team. On April 4, 2010, the team traded long-time starting quarterback Donovan McNabb to the Washington Redskins in exchange for a second-round draft pick. Kevin Kolb was immediately named the starter for the 2010 season, but after suffering a concussion in week 1 against the Packers, Vick took over as the starter. Week 4 saw the return of McNabb to Philadelphia. The Redskins got a touchdown early in the first quarter. After that, both offenses sputtered, and the Eagles had to settle for two field goals. But things rapidly fell apart when Vick injured his ribs and chest late in the first quarter when two Redskins defensive backs crushed him from both sides while running near the end zone. Kolb was once again brought out to play but delivered an uninspiring performance. He managed a touchdown pass in the fourth quarter, but it wasn't enough. A two-point conversion attempt after the touchdown failed, and Washington won 16–12. In Week 15, the Eagles beat the New York Giants in a stunning upset by overcoming a 21-point deficit in the second half. In the closing seconds of the game, DeSean Jackson returned a punt 65 yards for a touchdown to win 38–31. This became known as the Miracle at the New Meadowlands. Vick led the Eagles to their sixth NFC East division title in ten seasons. With a record of 10–6, the Eagles clinched the third seed. In the wild card round, the Eagles lost 21–16 to the eventual Super Bowl XLV champion Green Bay Packers.

The 2011 season for the Eagles was a major disappointment. The offseason was marred by a lockout that began in March after the NFL's collective bargaining agreement expired, making practices, trades, and free agency impossible. During the draft, the Eagles did comparatively little. After the lockout ended in July, the team embarked on a rash of high-profile FA signings, including Raiders CB Nnamdi Asomugha, Dolphins RB Ronnie Brown, Giants WR Steve Smith, Packers TE Donald Lee, Titans DE Jason Babin, and Packers DT Cullen Jenkins. Meanwhile, Kevin Kolb, displeased at losing the starting quarterback job to Michael Vick in 2010, was traded to Arizona for Dominique Rodgers-Cromartie. Replacing him as 2nd-stringer was ex-Titans quarterback Vince Young. Young created a lot of hype by calling Philadelphia the "Dream Team". The team managed to finish only 8–8 and missed the playoffs.

In 2012, the Eagles started off winning three of their first four games but lost their next eight, which eliminated them from the playoff hunt. They won only one of their last four games. After a loss to the New York Giants on December 30, 2012, head coach Andy Reid was fired after fourteen seasons with the team.

==== Chip Kelly years (2013–2015) ====
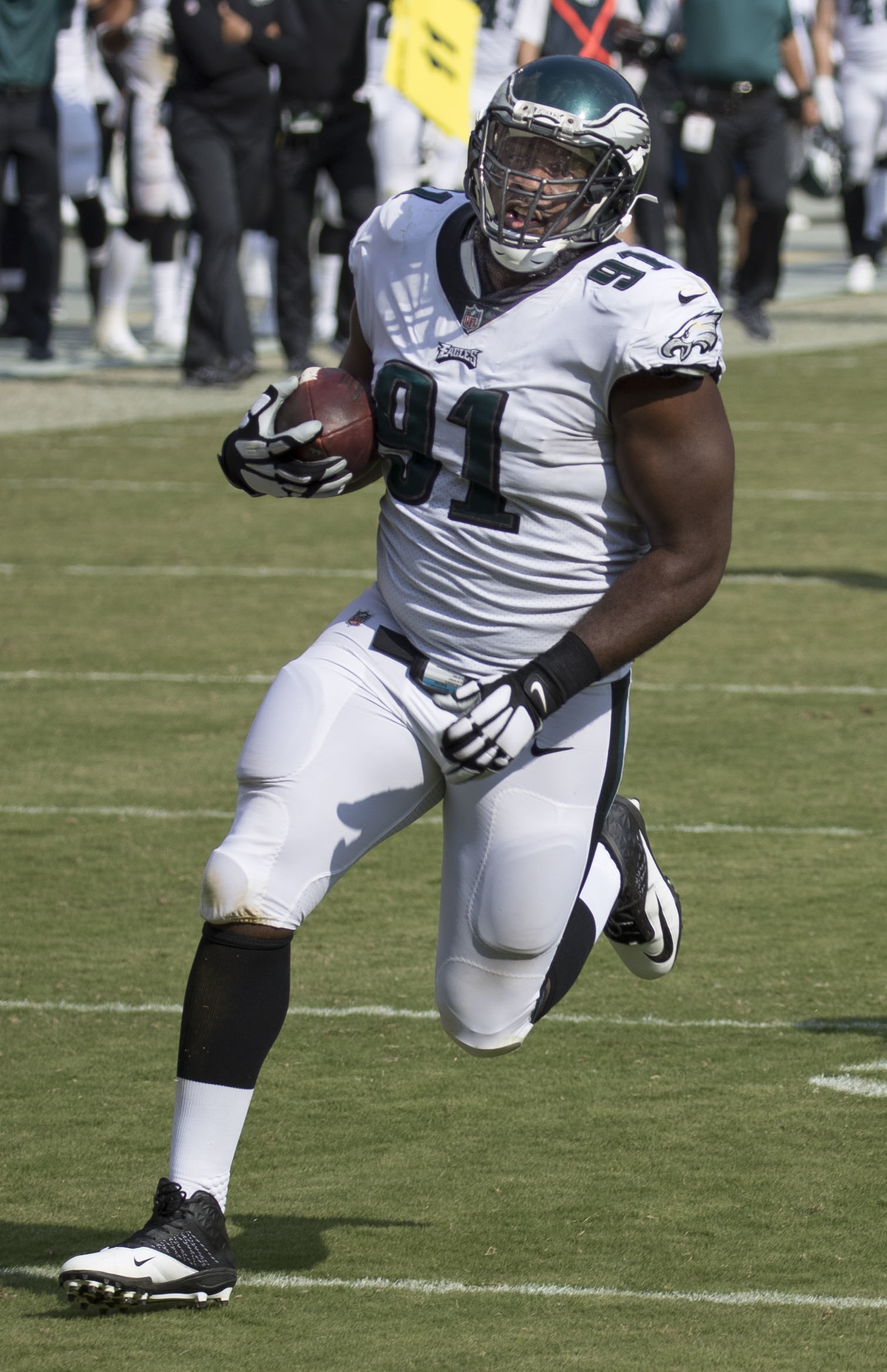
Fletcher Cox, Eagles defensive tackle from 2012 to 2023

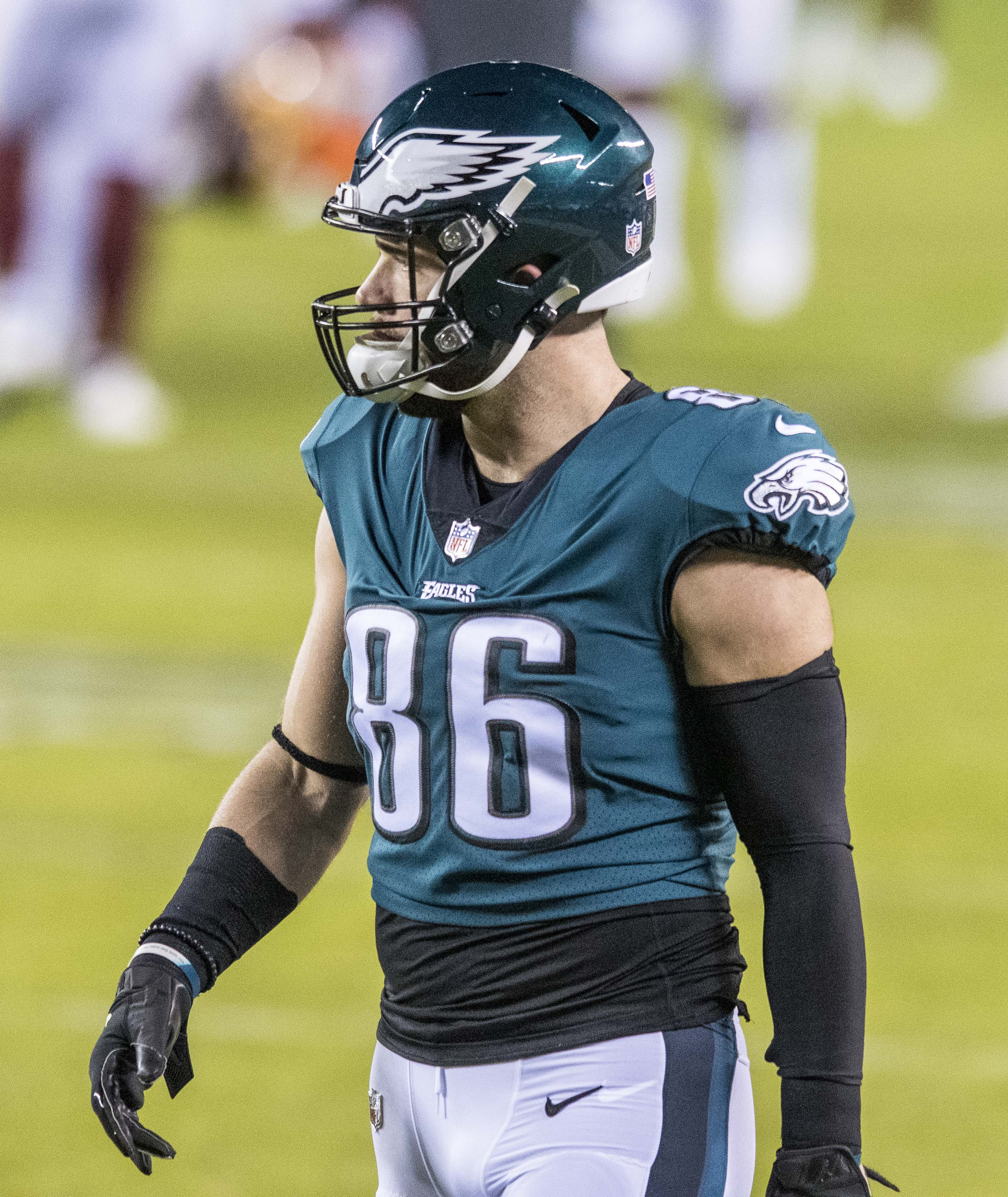
Zach Ertz, Eagles tight end from 2013 to 2021

On January 16, 2013, after a 4–12 season, the Eagles brought in University of Oregon head coach Chip Kelly to succeed Reid as head coach. The Philadelphia Eagles named Michael Vick the starting quarterback going into the 2013 season with much promise running Chip Kelly's spread offense. The 2013 season proved very successful for the Eagles. While a hamstring injury took Michael Vick out after a 1–3 start, his backup Nick Foles led the team to a 10–6 regular-season record and its seventh NFC East title in 13 seasons, but the Eagles lost to the New Orleans Saints in the wild card round. Before throwing his first interception in Week 14, Foles had thrown 19 touchdowns, just one shy of the all-time NFL record of consecutive touchdowns without an interception to start a season, set earlier in the season by Peyton Manning. Foles also tied Manning for most touchdown passes in a single game, with seven, against the Oakland Raiders, which also made him the youngest player in NFL history to throw for that many touchdowns in a game. Foles finished the regular season with 27 touchdown passes and only 2 interceptions, giving him the then-best TD-INT ratio in NFL history. (That record was later broken by Tom Brady, in the 2016 season.) He also finished with a 119.0 passer rating, third-highest in league history behind only Aaron Rodgers in 2011 and Peyton Manning in 2004. He was also only the second quarterback in NFL history to have a game in which he topped 400 passing yards and a perfect passer rating. LeSean McCoy finished his Pro Bowl season as the league's top rusher with 1,607 rushing yards (also a franchise record) and 2,146 total yards from scrimmage, also best in the NFL. As a whole, the Eagles offense scored 51 touchdowns, most in franchise history, passing the previous season-high set back in 1948. Following the 2013 season, the Eagles released Pro-Bowl wide receiver DeSean Jackson due to his poor "work ethic and attitude", as well as speculation of his involvement in gang-related activities. The team signed All Pro safety Malcolm Jenkins to a three-year contract, worth $16.25 million.

The Eagles opened the 2014 season winning their first three games and making NFL history as the only team ever to trail by ten or more points in their first three games and come back to win. Nick Foles struggled with turnovers, but ultimately did well and led the Eagles to a 6–2 record, before breaking his collarbone, resulting in his replacement by Mark Sanchez, who outplayed Foles. The Eagles held the divisional title from Week 1 to Week 15. After going 9–3 with a crucial win over the Dallas Cowboys, the Eagles lost their next three, and a week after losing the NFC East title, they lost an upset against the 3–11 Washington Redskins and were eliminated from playoff contention with the Cowboys' win over the Indianapolis Colts.

Following the 2014 season, Chip Kelly was given total control and made some controversial personnel moves. He traded LeSean McCoy, who had become the team's all-time leading rusher after the 2014 season, for linebacker Kiko Alonso, a player Kelly coached at Oregon who had missed the entire 2014 season. He also cut ten-year veteran and starter Trent Cole, who was still a consistent threat on defense and was second only to legend Reggie White on the Eagles all-time sack list. He also traded the highly successful Nick Foles for Sam Bradford, who had missed the entire 2014 season with a torn anterior cruciate ligament. Kelly tried to re-sign Jeremy Maclin, who had stepped up as the team's leading wide receiver, but Maclin signed with the Kansas City Chiefs instead. However, the Eagles also acquired league leading rusher DeMarco Murray, which not only helped the Eagles, but hurt their rivals, the Dallas Cowboys. They also obtained Super Bowl champion Byron Maxwell, who left the Seattle Seahawks in free agency to sign a six-year, $63 million contract. The first two games of the 2015 season were dismal, as they lost both. Bradford had a poor 2–4 TD-INT ratio, Maxwell was constantly beaten by Atlanta Falcons wide receiver Julio Jones, and Murray was held to 11 yards on 21 carries. After Murray was injured, Ryan Mathews rushed for over 100 yards in a Week 3 win against the New York Jets. Kelly made Murray the unquestioned starter and although Murray's play improved over the season, he never regained his dominant form and was held to a career-low average of 3.6 yards per carry.

On December 29, 2015, with one game left in the season, head coach Chip Kelly was released by the Eagles after a 6–9 record. Offensive coordinator Pat Shurmur was named interim head coach for the final game against the rival New York Giants, which Shurmur won 35–30.

==== Doug Pederson years (2016–2020) ====
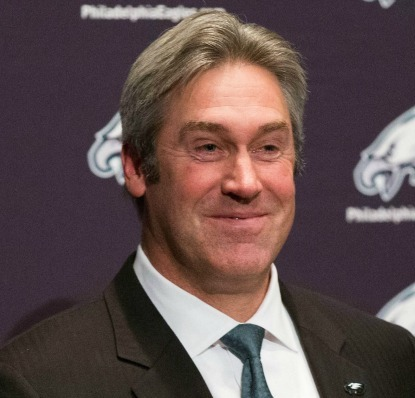
Doug Pederson, Eagles head coach from 2016 to 2020, led the team to its first Super Bowl win on February 4, 2018, in Super Bowl LII.

The Eagles hired Kansas City Chiefs' offensive coordinator Doug Pederson as their next head coach on January 18, 2016. Pederson had been with the Chiefs for the preceding three years after having spent the four seasons before those with the Eagles. He served as a quality control assistant coach for the Eagles in 2009 and 2010 before being promoted to quarterbacks coach for the 2011 and 2012 seasons. He had been praised for his work with Chiefs quarterback Alex Smith over the prior several seasons, particularly 2015, as the Chiefs moved into the top 10 in scoring offense.

At the end of the 2015 season, the Eagles were slated for the 13th overall pick in the 2016 NFL draft. They traded that pick, Byron Maxwell, and Kiko Alonso to the Miami Dolphins for the eighth overall pick. Later, they traded the eighth overall pick, their third and fourth round picks, a 2017 first round pick, and a 2018 second round pick to the Cleveland Browns for the second overall pick and a 2017 fourth round pick. They used the second overall pick to draft North Dakota State quarterback Carson Wentz. On September 3, 2016, the Eagles traded starting quarterback Sam Bradford to the Minnesota Vikings, who had lost Teddy Bridgewater for the season, for a 2017 first round pick and a 2018 fourth round pick. Following the trade, the Eagles named Wentz the starting quarterback for Week 1 of the 2016 season.

Head coach Doug Pederson led the Eagles to a 3–0 record to start the season. His rookie quarterback started with five touchdowns, no interceptions and over 255 yards per game. After a Week 4 bye, they lost four out of the next five games, including losses to every team in their division. They also lost right tackle Lane Johnson to a 10-game suspension following the Week 5 loss against the Lions, which damaged Carson Wentz's hot start. In those four defeats, their average margin of loss was just under 5 points. Pederson and the Eagles won just three of their final seven games. Although Wentz started off the season well, he finished with a TD–INT ratio of 8:7. The rookie head coach-quarterback tandem led the Eagles to a 7–9 record, finishing last in the division.

===== Super Bowl LII champions =====
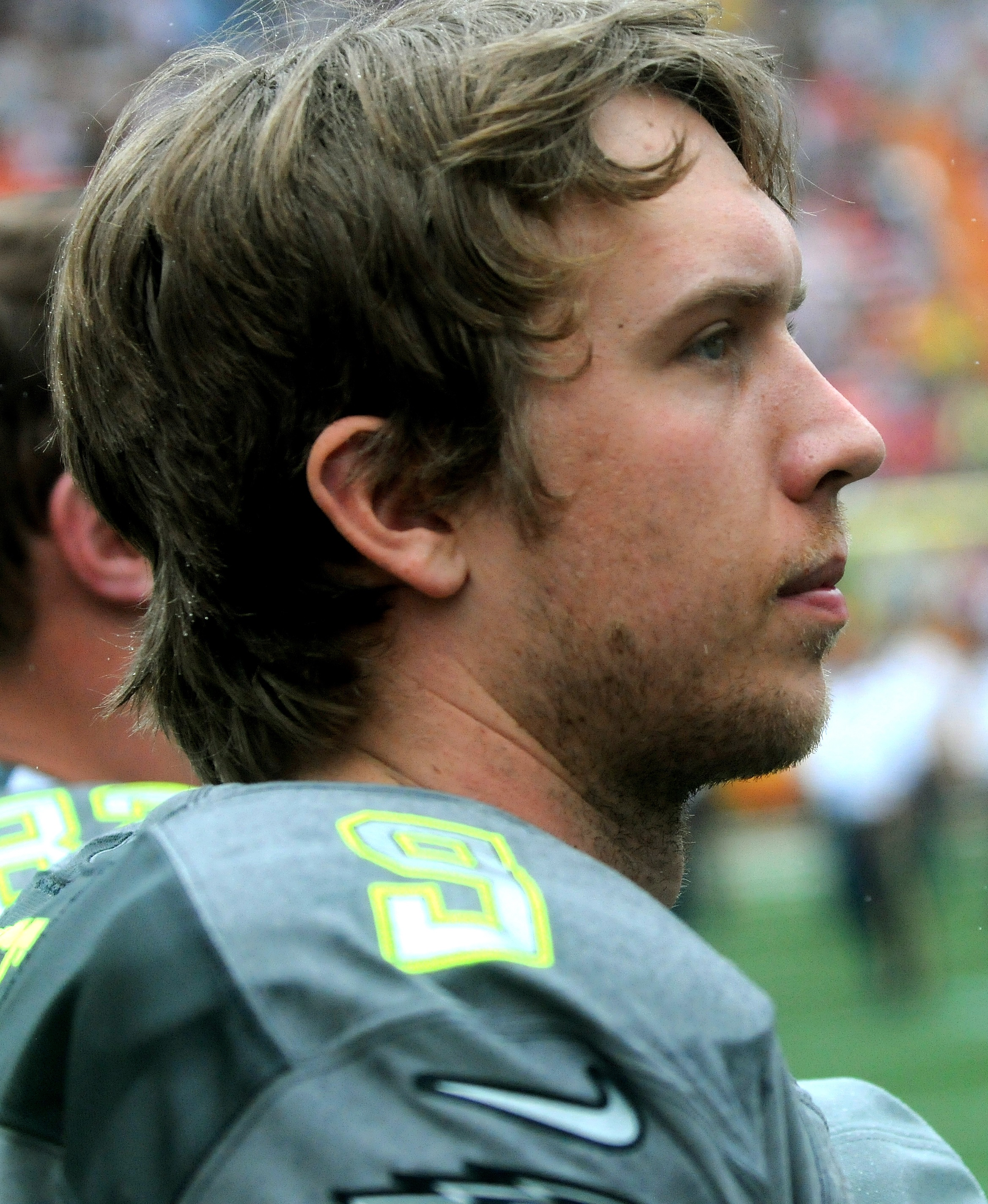
Nick Foles, Eagles quarterback from 2012 to 2014 and 2017 to 2018 and Super Bowl LII's Most Valuable Player

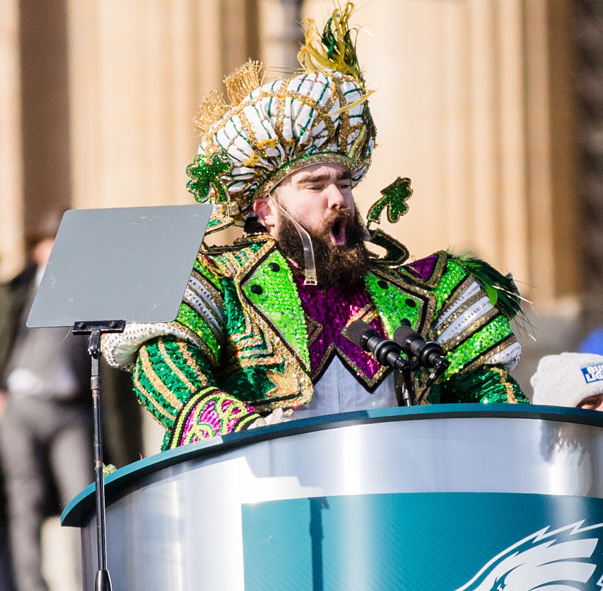
Jason Kelce, Eagles center from 2011 to 2023, at the championship parade in Philadelphia on February 8, 2018

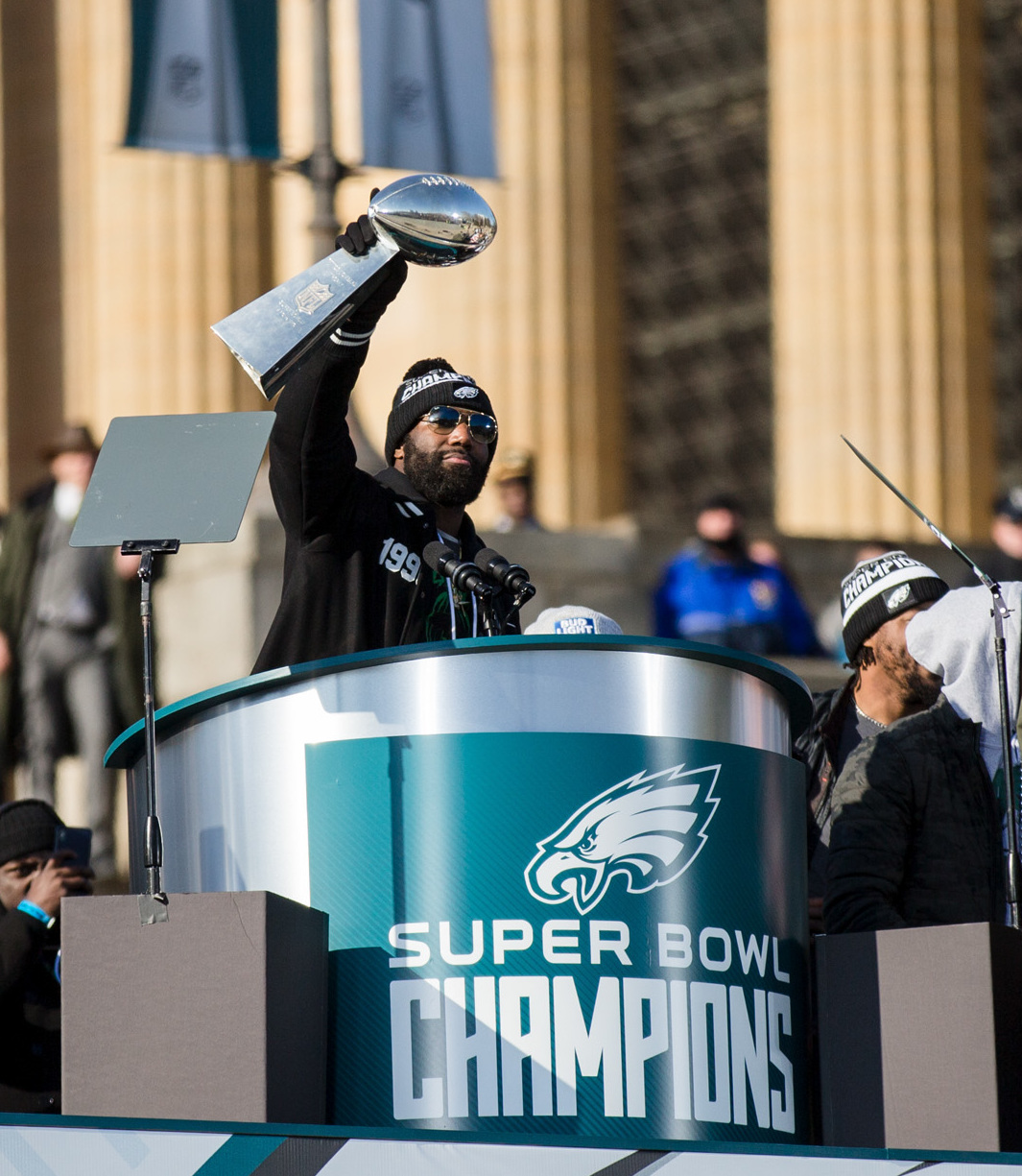
Malcolm Jenkins, Eagles safety from 2014 to 2019, holds the Vince Lombardi Trophy at the Eagles' February 2018 Super Bowl LII parade in Center City Philadelphia.

The Eagles started off the season with a 10–1 record and finished with a 13–3 record in 2017, including a nine-game winning streak. In a Week 14 game against the Los Angeles Rams, starting quarterback Carson Wentz left the game with a torn anterior cruciate ligament, and backup Nick Foles, who had been re-signed in the off-season, took over for the rest of the season. Wentz was considered to have been playing at an MVP level at the time of his injury. Foles's first start was a comeback from a 20–7 deficit against the New York Giants where he scored four touchdowns to win 34–29. Foles struggled in the last two games of the season against the Oakland Raiders and the Dallas Cowboys and threw a touchdown and two interceptions in those two games. The Eagles clinched the #1 seed and home field advantage throughout the playoffs after the win against Oakland in Week 16.

Despite making history by being home underdogs, Foles led the Eagles past the Atlanta Falcons in the Divisional Round 15–10. In the NFC Championship game, the Eagles dominated the Minnesota Vikings and their league best defense 38–7, again having been betting underdogs in the game. Foles elevated his play and threw for 352 passing yards and three touchdowns. The Eagles traveled to Minneapolis to compete in Super Bowl LII, their third attempt at a title, against Tom Brady and the New England Patriots in a rematch of Super Bowl XXXIX from 2005.

In the second quarter, Philadelphia faced 4th and goal on the 1-yard line with 38 seconds left. Deciding to go for the touchdown, they attempted a trick play similar to one that had failed for the Patriots earlier. It would be the most memorable play of the game. As Foles stepped up to the running back position, Clement took a direct snap and pitched the ball to tight end Trey Burton, who then threw the ball to Foles, who was wide open in the right side of the end zone. Foles caught the ball, making him the first quarterback ever to catch a touchdown pass in a Super Bowl, and the ensuing extra point was good, giving the Eagles a 22–12 lead. The scoring play came to be known as the Philly Special.

The Eagles went on to win 41–33, capturing their first Super Bowl Vince Lombardi Trophy in franchise history and their first championship since 1960, ending the third-longest active championship drought in the NFL at 57 years. Foles won Super Bowl MVP going 28 for 43 with 373 passing yards, three passing touchdowns, one interception, and one receiving touchdown. Foles became the first backup quarterback to start and win a Super Bowl since his opponent Tom Brady won as the backup for Drew Bledsoe in 2002's Super Bowl XXXVI. The combined 74 points scored was one point shy of the Super Bowl record of 75, set in Super Bowl XXIX in 1995; this game marked only the second time in the history of the Super Bowl where the teams combined for 70+ points. The game also set a record for most yardage by both teams (combined) with 1,151 yards, the most for any single game, regular season or postseason.

Before the 2018 season started, many injuries plagued the team, including quarterback Carson Wentz, who was still recovering from an anterior cruciate ligament injury that he had sustained during the previous season. Nick Foles was named the starting quarterback to begin the season, and helped the team win their opening game against the Atlanta Falcons, 18–12. Wentz returned as the starting quarterback in week 3 after Foles had led the team to a 1–1 record. Injuries continued to be a major problem throughout the season, especially on defense as Jalen Mills, Ronald Darby, and Rodney McLeod all suffered season-ending injuries.

Wentz suffered a fractured vertebra in his back after a week 14 loss to the Dallas Cowboys, and Foles was again named the starter for remainder of the season. The Eagles' 4–6 record after 10 games seemed to give them little chance of making the playoffs, but the team managed to win 5 of their last 6, including upsets over the eventual NFC champion Los Angeles Rams and Houston Texans. The Eagles finished the season with a 9–7 record and made the playoffs as the sixth seed.

In the Wild Card game against the Chicago Bears, Foles threw 2 touchdowns and 2 interceptions in a 16–15 win. With ten seconds left, Bears kicker Cody Parkey missed a potential game-winning field goal that became known in NFL lore as the Double Doink. This sent the Philadelphia Eagles to an NFC Divisional matchup against the New Orleans Saints. The Eagles offense initially performed well, ending the first quarter with a 14–0 lead. The Eagles would not score again after the Saints defense rallied, forcing Foles to throw two interceptions. The Eagles ended up losing by a score of 20–14, ending their opportunity to repeat as Super Bowl champions

In 2019, the Eagles matched their 9–7 record from 2018. They won 4 straight games against divisional opponents to close the season, clinching the NFC East in Week 17 with a 34–17 win over the New York Giants and clinched a playoff berth for the third consecutive season. Carson Wentz started his first playoff game in the Wild Card round against the Seattle Seahawks, but left the game early in the first quarter after suffering a concussion on a controversial helmet-to-helmet hit by Jadeveon Clowney. Backup quarterback Josh McCown finished the game even after suffering a torn hamstring in the second quarter. The Eagles lost to the Seahawks 17–9, ending their season.

The Eagles opened the 2020 season with consecutive losses to the Washington Football Team and Los Angeles Rams. In week 3, the Eagles tied with the Cincinnati Bengals after controversially punting the ball instead of attempting a potential 64-yard game-winning field goal late in overtime. The decision was widely criticized by sports media and fans as they accused head coach Doug Pederson of settling for a tie, rather than playing to win. Once again, injuries continued to plague the team as almost every offensive starter had suffered an injury throughout the season, and the team fielded 14 different offensive line combinations in 16 games.

The team entered the bye week with a 3–4–1 record and proceeded to lose their next four games. During their week 13 match up against the Green Bay Packers, rookie quarterback Jalen Hurts entered the game in the third quarter in relief of Wentz after poor play. Hurts would later be named the starting quarterback for the remainder of the season after a career-worst season performance by Wentz. Hurts led the Eagles to a 24–21 victory against the New Orleans Saints in week 14. This would be the team's last win of the 2020 season as they lost their next three games, finishing with a 4–11–1 record and missing the playoffs for the first time in four seasons.

During the off-season, defensive coordinator Jim Schwartz announced that he would step down from his position. A day later, linebackers coach Ken Flajole left his position on the team. Doug Pederson met with Eagles owner Jeffrey Lurie to discuss the future of the team. Pederson proposed changes to the coaching staff that were described by internal reporters as "underwhelming" and out of line with Lurie's vision for the team. On January 11, 2021, the Eagles announced that they had fired Pederson. In a statement, Lurie described the move as in the best interests of both Pederson and the team. Pederson became just the first head coach to be fired within three years of winning a Super Bowl since the Baltimore Colts fired Don McCafferty after the 1972 NFL season.

==== Nick Sirianni years (2021–present) ====
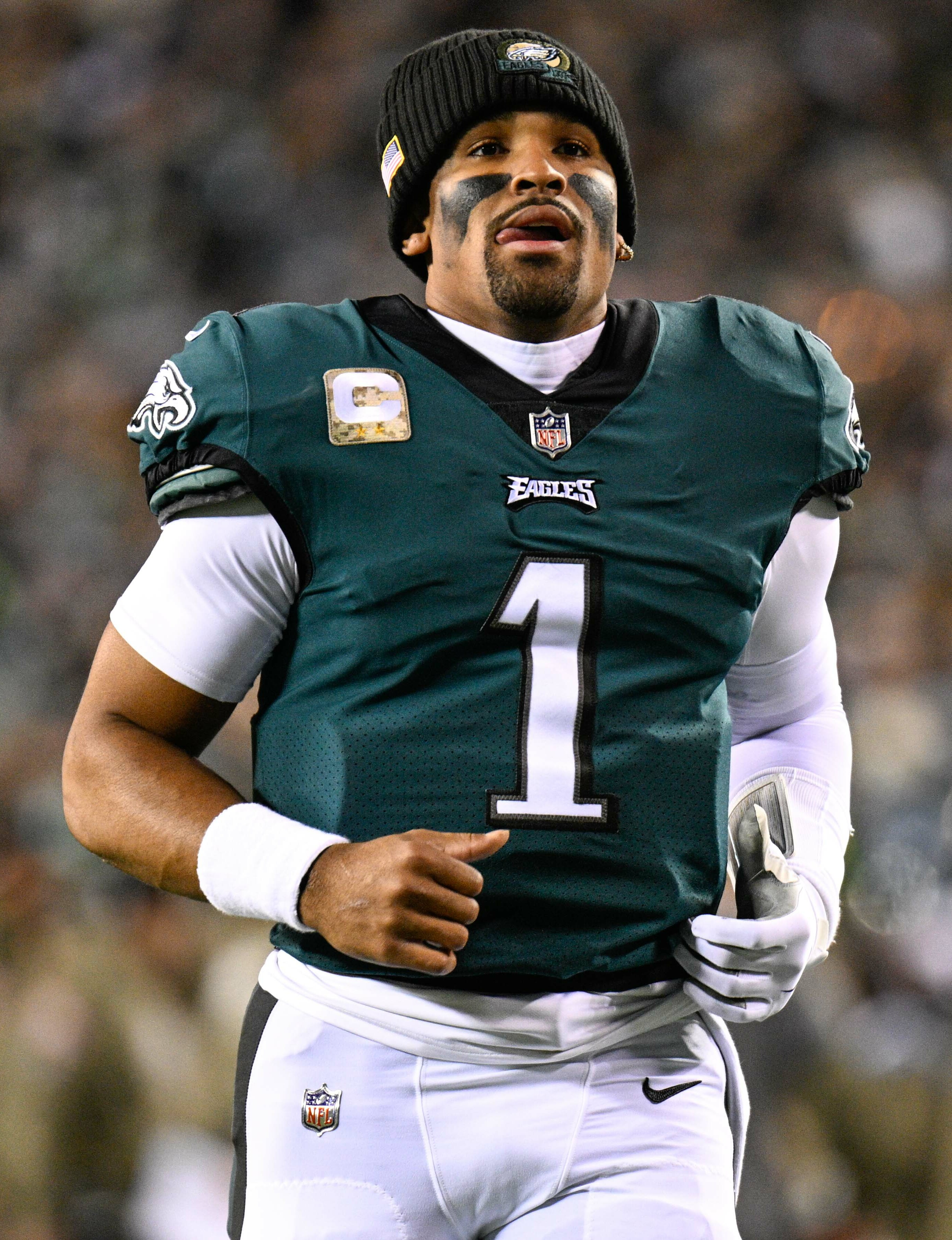
Jalen Hurts, Eagles quarterback since 2020

The Eagles hired former Indianapolis Colts' offensive coordinator Nick Sirianni as their next head coach on January 21, 2021. During the offseason, the Eagles traded starting quarterback Carson Wentz to the Colts for a 2021 third round draft pick and a 2022 conditional second round pick. In doing so, Wentz was reunited with Frank Reich, head coach of the Colts who served as the Eagles' offensive coordinator for Wentz's first two years in Philadelphia, including during their Super Bowl-winning season in 2017. The Eagles absorbed a $33.8-million dead cap hit for trading Wentz.

During the 2021 NFL draft, the Eagles selected Heisman Trophy–winning wide receiver DeVonta Smith with the 10th overall pick, and maneuvered around the draft to gain an extra first-round selection in the 2022 NFL draft. Smith was a highly touted prospect out of the University of Alabama, and was the first Heisman winner the Eagles drafted in over fifty years. The drafting of Smith also reunited him with Jalen Hurts, his first quarterback at Alabama. After training camp, Hurts was officially named the Eagles' starting quarterback for the 2021 season by head coach Sirianni.

After starting the season 2–5, the Eagles went 7–3 in their last ten games, clinching a playoff berth in week 17 after a victory over the Washington Football Team along with a loss by the Minnesota Vikings and win by the San Francisco 49ers. The Eagles finished the season with the #1 rushing offense; It was the best rushing offense since the 1985 Chicago Bears, and the best in the franchise history since the 1949 Eagles team. They lost in the wild card game against the Tampa Bay Buccaneers 31–15.

During the 2022 NFL draft, the Eagles traded the 18th overall pick to the Tennessee Titans for pro bowl wide receiver AJ Brown. With the addition and pairing of Brown with Devonta Smith, the team saw an elevation of play from second year quarterback Jalen Hurts. The Eagles went on to win their first eight games of the 2022 season, starting 8–0 for the first time in franchise history. After a 25–20 road win over the Chicago Bears in Week 15, the Eagles matched their franchise-best 13–1 start during the 2004 season and secured their third 13-win season in franchise history and first since 2017. In Week 18, after losses in the previous two games, Hurts returned from a late season shoulder injury and helped the Eagles to a 22–16 win over the Giants, clinching the NFC East for the first time since 2019, and the NFC's #1 seed for the first time since 2017. The Eagles also reached 14 regular season wins, a franchise record. Hurts was named as one of the five finalists for the NFL Most Valuable Player Award, where he would eventually finish second in voting.

In the Divisional Round, the Eagles routed the Giants 38–7 for their first postseason win since 2018. With this win, Philadelphia completed a 3–0 sweep of all three games played against New York, and advanced to the NFC Championship for the first time since 2017. The Eagles went on to win the NFC Championship against the San Francisco 49ers, who finished the game injury depleted, 31–7, advancing to Super Bowl LVII. In their fourth Super Bowl appearance in franchise history, the Eagles faced the Kansas City Chiefs and former longtime head coach Andy Reid. In the game, Hurts' 70 rushing yards three rushing touchdowns broke the record for the most rushing yards and rushing touchdowns by a quarterback in Super Bowl history, despite this and holding a 24–14 lead at halftime, the Eagles ultimately lost on a Chiefs late field goal and a final score of 38–35.

The Eagles opened the 2023 season as the defending NFC Champions. Despite starting the season 10–1, The Eagles failed to equal or improve on their 14–3 record from the previous year. Even in victory, the Eagles had problems with a poor defense the entire season, which was ranked 26th out of 32; 8 of their 11 victories fell within one score, and their losses to the 49ers and Cowboys were blowouts. The Eagles' slump continued into the playoffs, in which they were eliminated in the Wild Card round by the NFC South champion Tampa Bay Buccaneers in a 32–9 blowout loss. The Eagles promptly fired offensive coordinator Brian Johnson and defensive coordinator Sean Desai within a week of their playoff exit.

In the offseason, on March 4, 2024, center Jason Kelce retired after spending his entire 13-year career with the Eagles. On March 10, defensive tackle Fletcher Cox would also retire after spending 12 seasons with the team. The Eagles hired veteran defensive coach Vic Fangio, who had served as a consultant for the team during the 2022 season, as their new defensive coordinator. Former Chargers offensive coordinator Kellen Moore was brought in for the offense.

===== Super Bowl LIX champions =====
On March 13, 2024, Saquon Barkley, a former running back with the New York Giants, became a free agent, and signed a three-year $37.75 million deal with the Eagles. On September 6, 2024, the Eagles opened their season in São Paulo, Brazil. In his debut, Barkley rushed for 109 yards with two rushing touchdowns and a receiving touchdown in a 34–29 victory over the Green Bay Packers, becoming the first Eagles player to score three touchdowns in their debut with the team since Terrell Owens in 2004.

Despite a turbulent 2–2 start to the season, the Eagles improved on their 11–6 record from the previous season, and won ten consecutive games for the first time in franchise history. For the fourth straight year and seventh time in the last eight seasons, the Eagles clinched a playoff berth. Barkley was dominant throughout the season, highlighted by a notable performance in Week 12 against the Los Angeles Rams, where he recorded a franchise record 255 rushing yards and 302 total yards.

In Week 17, the Eagles clinched the NFC East and with that win, swept the Dallas Cowboys for the first time since 2011. Barkley ran for 167 yards during this game and crossed the 2,000 yard mark, becoming only the ninth running back in NFL history to do so. With their Week 18 win over the New York Giants, the Eagles finished 14–3 for the second time in three seasons.

The Eagles started the playoffs by defeating the Green Bay Packers 22–10 in the Wild Card Round. In a snowy rematch of their Week 12 meeting, the Eagles again beat the Los Angeles Rams in the Divisional Round 28–22. In the NFC Championship Game, the Eagles dominated their division rival Washington Commanders 55–23, setting the record for the most points scored in a conference championship game. In Super Bowl LIX, the Eagles met the Kansas City Chiefs in a rematch of Super Bowl LVII from two years earlier, this time defeating the two-time defending champions by a score of 40–22 and winning their second Super Bowl and first since the 2017 season.

The Eagles' win prevented the Chiefs from achieving the first-ever Super Bowl three-peat. Barkley recorded 57 rushing yards, setting the NFL record for most rushing (2,504) and scrimmage yards (2,857) in a full season surpassing Terrell Davis. Philadelphia quarterback Jalen Hurts threw for 221 yards with two touchdowns and rushed for 72 yards and a touchdown, breaking his own record for most rushing yards for a quarterback in a Super Bowl, with 72. Hurts was named Super Bowl MVP for his performance in the victory. The Eagles finished with 18 total wins, tying the NFL record for most total wins in a season along with the 1984 San Francisco 49ers, 1985 Chicago Bears, and 2007 New England Patriots. The Eagles' 145 points scored set an NFL record for the most points scored in a postseason.

2025 was the Eagles' fourth consecutive season with a new offensive coordinator, as Kellen Moore was hired as the head coach of the New Orleans Saints following the Super Bowl. The Eagles opened their season against the rival Dallas Cowboys, raising their second World Championship banner en route to a 24-20 victory. After initially retiring in the offseason, longest tenured Eagle Brandon Graham finalized a contract to return to the Eagles after the teams Week 9 bye week. The Eagles were not able to improve on their 14–3 record from the previous season after a second-half comeback loss to the Dallas Cowboys in Week 12, and failed to match it after an upset loss to the Chicago Bears the following week. With their Week 15 shutout win over the Las Vegas Raiders, the Eagles secured their fifth consecutive winning season with Brandon Graham recording two sacks, becoming the oldest player in Eagles history to record a sack and passing hall of famer Richard Dent.

After their Week 16 win over the division rival Washington Commanders, the Eagles clinched the NFC East division title, becoming the first team to repeat as NFC East champions since the 2004 Eagles, and becoming the only 2024 division winner to win their division again in 2025. In the playoffs, the Eagles offensive inconsistencies caught up to them, as they were defeated in the Wild Card round by the San Francisco 49ers, 23–19, ending their hopes for a repeat. Immediately following on January 13, 2026, Patullo and Philadelphia parted ways, with pundits and players calling Patullo's playcalling and offense uninspiring and very predictable.

On January 29, 2026, the Eagles hired new coordinator Sean Mannion as part of their offensive coaching overhaul. Long time and highly regarded offensive line coach Jeff Stoutland also stepped away from the team after 13 seasons. On June 1, 2026, wide receiver AJ Brown was traded to the New England Patriots in exchange for a 2027 fifth-round pick and a 2028 first-round pick. Brown had begun to publicly voice frustrations with his role in the Eagles' offense often despite team success, leading to tension and media speculation about a potentially strained relationship with multiple team members, most notably quarterback, Jalen Hurts.

== Championships ==
=== NFL championships (pre-Super Bowl era) ===
Season	Coach	Location	Opponent	Score	Record
1948	Greasy Neale	Shibe Park (Philadelphia)	Chicago Cardinals	7–0	9–2–1
1949	Greasy Neale	Los Angeles Memorial Coliseum (Los Angeles)	Los Angeles Rams	14–0	11–1
1960	Buck Shaw	Franklin Field (Philadelphia)	Green Bay Packers	17–13	10–2
Total NFL Championships won: 3					

=== Super Bowl championships ===
Season	Coach	Super Bowl	Location	Opponent	Score	Record
2017	Doug Pederson	LII	U.S. Bank Stadium (Minneapolis)	New England Patriots	41–33	13–3
2024	Nick Sirianni	LIX	Caesars Superdome (New Orleans)	Kansas City Chiefs	40–22	14–3
Total Super Bowls won: 2						

=== NFC championships ===
Season	Coach	Location	Opponent	Score
1980	Dick Vermeil	Veterans Stadium (Philadelphia)	Dallas Cowboys	20–7
2004	Andy Reid	Lincoln Financial Field (Philadelphia)	Atlanta Falcons	27–10
2017	Doug Pederson	Lincoln Financial Field (Philadelphia)	Minnesota Vikings	38–7
2022	Nick Sirianni	Lincoln Financial Field (Philadelphia)	San Francisco 49ers	31–7
2024	Nick Sirianni	Lincoln Financial Field (Philadelphia)	Washington Commanders	55–23
Total NFC Championships won: 5				

=== Division championships ===
The Eagles were a part of the NFL Eastern Division from 1933 to 1949, the National Conference from 1950 to 1953, and the Eastern Conference from 1953 to 1966. They were then placed in the Capitol Division of the Eastern Conference in 1967. When the league reformed into the NFC and AFC in 1970, the Eagles were placed in the NFC East.

Year	Coach	Record
1947	Greasy Neale	8–4
1948	Greasy Neale	11–5
1949	Greasy Neale	11–5
1980	Dick Vermeil	12–4
1988	Buddy Ryan	10–6
2001	Andy Reid	11–5
2002	Andy Reid	12–4
2003	Andy Reid	12–4
2004	Andy Reid	13–3
2006	Andy Reid	10–6
2010	Andy Reid	10–6
2013	Chip Kelly	10–6
2017	Doug Pederson	13–3
2019	Doug Pederson	9–7
2022	Nick Sirianni	14–3
2024	Nick Sirianni	14–3
2025	Nick Sirianni	11–6
Total division titles won: 17

== Logo and uniforms ==
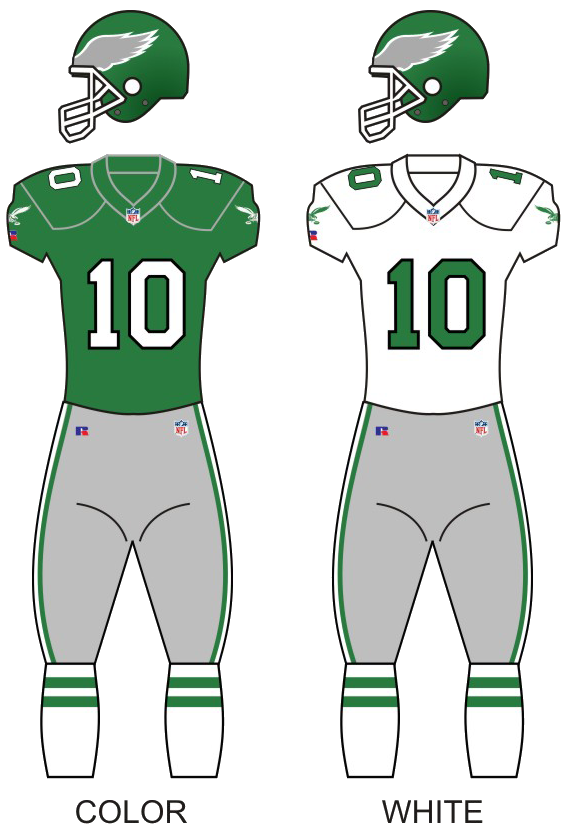
Illustration of Philadelphia Eagles uniforms worn from 1985 to 1995

The Eagles' wordmark logo from 1996 to 2022

The Eagles' wordmark logo used since 2022

The choice of an eagle as the team mascot honored the insignia of the New Deal program, the National Recovery Administration, which featured a blue eagle as its insignia. (Note: For information about Eagles' uniform numbers, see Berman, Zach (November 18, 2016). "What's in a number? Eagles tell their stories: Some are chosen, some are random". Philadelphia Media Network (Digital). Archived from the original on December 1, 2016.)

For the 1933 and 1934 seasons, the Eagles colors were light blue and yellow. In 1935, they added green to their uniforms and for several decades, their colors were kelly green, silver, and white. In 1954 the Eagles, along with the Baltimore Colts, became the second team ever in the NFL to put a logo on their helmets, with silver wings on a kelly green helmet. In 1969 the team wore two helmet versions: Kelly green with white wings in road games, and white with kelly green wings at home.

From 1970 to '73, they wore the white helmets with Kelly green wings exclusively before switching back to Kelly green helmets with silver wings. By 1974, Joseph A. Scirrotto Jr. designed the silver wings within a white outline, and this style on a kelly green helmet became standard for over two decades.

From 1948 to 1995, the team logo was an eagle in flight carrying a football in its claws, although from 1969 to 1972, the eagle took on a more stylized look.

In 1973, the team's name was added below the eagle, returning to its pre-1969 look. Both the logo and uniforms were radically altered in 1996, when the primary kelly green color was changed to a darker shade, officially described as "midnight green". Silver was practically abandoned, as uniform pants moved to either white or midnight green. The traditional helmet wings were changed to a primarily white color, with silver and black accents. The team's logo combination, the eagle and club name lettering, changed, with the eagle itself limited to a white bald eagle head, drawn in a less realistic, more cartoon-like style, and the lettering changed from calligraphic to block letters. The eagle head is the only NFL logo to "face left" which causes the right side of the logo to present a stylized "E".

Since 1996, the team has made only minor alterations, mostly related to jersey/pants combinations worn during specific games. For example, in 1997, against the San Francisco 49ers, the team wore midnight green jerseys and pants for the first of only two occasions in team history. The second occasion was in 2002, during the final regular season game at Veterans Stadium, a win over the division rival Washington Redskins.

In the first two games of the 2003 season, both home losses, to the Tampa Bay Buccaneers and New England Patriots, the Eagles wore white jerseys with white pants. After that, the white jerseys along with white pants were worn exclusively during preseason games from 2004 to 2011, with the exception of 2007 and 2010.

The 2003 season also saw the first subtle change to the 1996-style uniform. On both white and green jerseys, black shadows and silver trim were added to both the green and white numbering. The stripe on the pants changed from black-green-black to black-silver-green on the white pants, and from a solid black stripe to one stripe of black, another of silver, with one small white stripe in between for the midnight green pants. The 2003 season also saw the team debut black alternate jerseys, with a green instead of black shadow on white numbers, and silver trim.

These black jerseys have been worn for two selected home games each season, usually the first home game after a bye week and the season finale. In the 2003 and 2004 regular season home finales, the team wore the green road pants with the black alternate jerseys, but lost both games. Since then, the Eagles have only worn the black jerseys with the white pants. Due to the special 75th anniversary uniforms serving as the "alternates" for one game in 2007, the Eagles could not wear the alternate black jersey that season per league rules at the time. Alternate uniforms were permitted twice per season but only one can be used.

The black jerseys with white pants reappeared for the 2008 Thanksgiving night game against the Arizona Cardinals. From 2006 to 2013, the Eagles have only worn the alternate black jerseys once a season and for the last November home game, but did not use them in 2007, 2010, and 2011. For the 2007 and 2010 seasons, the Eagles used throwback uniforms in place of the black alternates for their anniversary to commemorate past teams. The team also started wearing black cleats exclusively in 2004, although the rule was relaxed by the mid-2010s.

To celebrate the team's 75th anniversary, the 2007 uniforms featured a 75th season logo patch on the left shoulder. In addition, the team wore "throwback" jerseys in a 2007 game against the Detroit Lions. The yellow and blue jerseys, the same colors found on Philadelphia's city flag, are based on those worn by the Philadelphia Eagles in the team's inaugural season, and had been the same colors used by the Frankford Yellow Jackets franchise prior to its suspension of operations in 1931. The Eagles beat Detroit, 56–21.

In the 2010 season against the Green Bay Packers, on September 12, 2010, the Eagles wore uniforms similar to the ones that were worn by the 1960 championship team in honor the 50th anniversary of that team. In weeks 4 and 6 of the 2010 season, the Eagles wore their white jerseys in a matchup against the Washington Redskins and Atlanta Falcons, respectively, before reverting to their midnight green jerseys for the rest of their home games.

For the 2012 season, Nike took over from Reebok as the NFL's official apparel licensee, but the Eagles decided that they would not be adopting Nike's "Elite 51" uniform technology. Aside from the Nike logo replacing the Reebok logo, the only other change is the league-wide revision of the NFL shield on the uniform, replacing the NFL Equipment logo. Other than that the uniforms essentially remain unchanged. The Eagles also revived their black alternate jersey and resumed wearing white pants with their white jerseys in the regular season.

For the 2014 season, the Eagles officially adopted the "Elite 51"-style uniform from Nike. However, they only wore the midnight green jerseys and pants in the second half of that season due to the difficulty of producing their preferred shade of midnight green.

In Week 6 of 2014 against the New York Giants, the team introduced black pants to complement their black jerseys, giving them a blackout uniform set. The Eagles won the game 27–0. The victory was their first shutout in 18 years. In Week 16 of 2016 (also against the Giants), the Eagles wore a variation of the all-black look as part of the NFL Color Rush program, but with solid black socks as opposed to black with white sanitary socks of the original look. From 2018 to 2024, the Eagles regularly wore the all-black uniforms at home against the Giants. The black jerseys/white pants combination was last seen during a preseason road game against the New England Patriots, after which the black jerseys were paired exclusively with the black pants.

In 2018, the Eagles' midnight green pants were not worn at all, marking the first such instance since the 1996 rebrand that the Eagles wore only white pants with their primary white or midnight green jerseys.

In Week 6 of the 2017 season, the Eagles debuted an all-white look with white jerseys, white pants and solid white socks in a road game against the Carolina Panthers. The all-white look began to be utilized full Time as a road uniform set in 2019 thanks to the NFL's decision to allow teams to wear solid color socks as an alternate look.

During Week 10 of the 2021 season, the Eagles paired their white uniforms with the alternate black pants against the Denver Broncos, marking the first time the black pants were paired with a different colored uniform.

In 2022, the Eagles unveiled a new black alternate helmet, which would be worn alongside the all-black uniform. The team announced that throwback Kelly Green uniforms would return as an alternate uniform starting in the 2023 season. The team originally intended to release the uniforms in 2022, but due to production supply issues, the Eagles elected to delay its release to the 2023 season. The Eagles returned to wearing Kelly Green uniforms as the teams alternate, with their debut being in a Week 7 win vs the Miami Dolphins. With the Kelly Green helmet becoming the team's one alternate, the black helmet was temporarily shelved, and the Eagles returned to wearing their primary midnight green helmets with the all-black uniform.

In 2022, the Eagles changed their wordmark to a more modern design. Due to supply chain issues, the new wordmark was not able to be applied to the uniforms until the 2024 season. The black helmet was brought back as the team's third helmet option; while the NFL only allowed teams with new designs to adopt a third helmet in 2024, the Eagles' minor change of jersey wordmark counted as such. The black helmets were worn with the white jerseys, black pants and white socks for the team's Week 1 game in São Paulo, Brazil against the Green Bay Packers, and again in a 2025 Week 10 rematch at Lambeau Field.

== Rivalries ==
=== Divisional ===
==== Washington Commanders ====
While not as big as the rivalries with the Giants and Cowboys, the Eagles' historical rivalry with the Washington Redskins / Washington Football Team / Washington Commanders has still been fierce. Although the two franchises played in the same division in the Eagles' inaugural 1933 season, their first meeting did not take place until October 21, 1934, during Washington's first year under the Boston Redskins moniker; the Redskins defeated the Eagles 6–0 at Fenway Park. Washington currently leads the all-time series 90–87–6. Since 2010, the rivalry has been very even overall with the Eagles winning 19 of the last 31 matchups.

==== Dallas Cowboys ====
The Eagles and Dallas Cowboys rivalry has been listed among the best and most acrimonious in the NFL. The Eagles won the first game in this rivalry 27–25 on September 30, 1960. Dallas leads the all-time series 74–58 as of the 2024 season, but in recent years, the series has been close, with each team winning 12 games since 2006. There is considerable hostility between the two teams' fan bases, with incidents such as the 1989 Bounty Bowl. The rivalry has even spilled over into draft weekend, with Cowboys legend Drew Pearson and Eagles legend David Akers exchanging insults at the opposing franchise in 2017 and 2018, respectively.

==== New York Giants ====
The Eagles' rivalry with the New York Giants began in 1933 with the founding of the Eagles and slowly strengthened when both teams came to relative prominence in the 1940s and 1950s. The two teams have played in the same division in the NFL every year since 1933. The ferocity of the rivalry can also be attributed to the geographic New York–Philadelphia rivalry, which is mirrored in Major League Baseball's Mets–Phillies and the NHL's Flyers–Rangers and Flyers–Islanders. It is ranked by NFL Network as one of the greatest rivalries of all time, Sports Illustrated ranks it as the fourth best NFL rivalry of all time, and according to ESPN, it is one of the fiercest and most well-known rivalries in the football community. As of the 2024 season, the Eagles lead the all-time series 96–89–2.

=== Conference ===
==== Atlanta Falcons ====
The Eagles lead the Atlanta Falcons 21–16–1, with a 3–1 lead in playoff games. The rivalry first emerged after the Falcons upset the Eagles in the 1978 Wild Card Round 14–13, and only intensified further during the 2000s thanks to the rivalry between prominent dual-threat quarterbacks Donovan McNabb and Michael Vick. Recently, the Eagles' path to winning Super Bowl LII included a 2017 divisional round victory over the Falcons.

==== Tampa Bay Buccaneers ====
The Eagles trail the overall series 13-12, with having a 2-4 record against the Buccaneers in the playoffs. The most notable matchup was the 2002 NFC Championship Game, where the Eagles lost 27-10, and was also the final game ever played at Veterans Stadium.

=== Interconference ===
==== Kansas City Chiefs ====
Despite playing in separate conferences, the Eagles played the Chiefs at least once a year since 2021, with two of those match ups being Super Bowls. The Chiefs beat the Eagles in Super Bowl LVII 38-35, with the Eagles getting their revenge in Super Bowl LIX, winning 40-22.

==== Pittsburgh Steelers ====
The Eagles and Pittsburgh Steelers are both located in Pennsylvania and began play in 1933. From that season through 1966, this was a major rivalry for both teams, as both were part of the same division. In 1967 they were placed in separate divisions, but remained in the same conference for three years. In 1970 the Steelers (along with the Cleveland Browns and Baltimore Colts) moved to the American Football Conference, while the Eagles stayed with the rest of the old line NFL teams in the National Football Conference. As a result, the Eagles and Steelers no longer played each other every year; instead, they are scheduled to meet once every four years in the regular season. The most recent meeting was in 2024 at Lincoln Financial Field, with the Eagles winning 27–13. The Steelers have lost eleven straight games on the road against the Eagles dating back to 1966, which was also the start of the Super Bowl era. As of the 2024 season, the Eagles lead the all-time series 50–29–3.

== Players ==
=== Current roster ===
Philadelphia Eagles roster
Quarterbacks (QB): 16 Tanner McKee; 14 Joe Milton; 18 Cole Payton; Running backs (RB): 26 Saquon Barkley; 30 Jaydon Blue; Wide receivers (WR): 80 Darius Cooper; 85 Britain Covey PR; 9 Makai Lemon; 19 Elijah Moore; 6 DeVonta Smith; 13 Dontayvion Wicks; Tight ends (TE): 81 Grant Calcaterra; 86 Zach Ertz; 88 Dallas Goedert; 83 Johnny Mundt; 87 Eli Stowers	Offensive linemen (OL): 72 Markel Bell T; -- Ajani Cornelius T; 69 Landon Dickerson G; 65 Lane Johnson T; 66 Drew Kendall C; 61 Willie Lampkin G; 68 Jordan Mailata T; 75 Jake Majors C; 76 Micah Morris G; 67 John Ojukwu T; 56 Tyler Steen G; Defensive linemen (DL): 98 Jalen Carter DT; 97 Moro Ojomo DT; 95 Ty Robinson DT; 94 Byron Young DT	Linebackers (LB): 53 Zack Baun; 11 Jihaad Campbell; 17 Arnold Ebiketie OLB; 57 A. J. Epenesa OLB; 52 Jonathan Greenard OLB; 58 Jalyx Hunt OLB; 42 Smael Mondon Jr.; 3 Nolan Smith OLB; 54 Jeremiah Trotter Jr.; Defensive backs (DB): 35 Michael Carter II S; 33 Cooper DeJean CB; 29 Marcus Epps S; 31 Jonathan Jones CB; 22 Mac McWilliams CB; 27 Quinyon Mitchell CB; 23 Kenny Moore II CB; 24 Andrew Mukuba S; 7 Kelee Ringo CB; 2 Riq Woolen CB; Special teams (ST): 4 Jake Elliott K; 10 Braden Mann P; 41 Rocco Underwood LS	Practice squad: 73 Kiran Amegadjie T; 64 Evan Beerntsen G; 93 Uar Bernard DT (PS/I); 21 Christian Braswell CB; 59 Chance Campbell LB; 82 Erik Ezukanma WR; -- Leki Fotu NT; 96 Gabe Hall DT; 50 Keyshawn James-Newby OLB; 49 Elijah Mitchell RB; 79 Evan Neal G; 45 Anfernee Orji LB; 43 Mason Reiger OLB; -- Hayden Rucci TE; -- Quentin Skinner WR; 46 Josh Weru OLB (IPP); 78 Zion Wilson DT; 38 Cole Wisniewski S; Reserve: 8 Tank Bigsby RB (IR); 1 Jalen Hurts QB (IR); 37 Tucker Large S (NF-Inj.); 32 Andre' Sam S (IR); 28 Will Shipley RB (IR/DFR); 89 Johnny Wilson WR (IR) 53 active, 16 practice squad (2 IPP), 6 reserve As of November 18, 2026. Rookies in italics.; Roster; Depth chart; Transactions

== Awards and honors ==
=== Retired numbers ===
Philadelphia Eagles retired numbers
No.	Player	Position	Tenure	Retired
5	Donovan McNabb	QB	1999–2009	September 20, 2013
15	Steve Van Buren	HB	1944–1951	1951
20	Brian Dawkins	S	1996–2008	September 30, 2012
40	Tom Brookshier	CB	1953–1961	1962
44	Pete Retzlaff	FL, TE	1956–1966	1965
60	Chuck Bednarik	LB, C	1949–1962	1987
70	Al Wistert	OT	1943–1951	1952
92	Reggie White^{(*)}	DE	1985–1992	December 5, 2005
99	Jerome Brown^{(*)}	DT	1987–1991	September 6, 1992

Notes:

- ^{(*)} Posthumous honors.
- Despite not being retired, the Eagles have not issued out Randall Cunningham's No. 12 since he left the Eagles in 1995 or LeSean McCoy's No. 25 since he left the team in 2015.

=== Pro Football Hall of Famers ===
As of 2025, 14 individuals who spent a significant part of their career with the Eagles (shown in bold below) have been inducted into the Pro Football Hall of Fame.

Philadelphia Eagles in the Pro Football Hall of Fame
Players
No.	Name	Positions	Seasons	Inducted	No.	Name	Positions	Seasons	Inducted
15	**Steve Van Buren**	HB	1944–1951	1965	80	James Lofton	WR	1993	2003
60	**Chuck Bednarik**	C–LB	1949–1962	1967	76	**Bob Brown**	OT	1964–1968	2004
53	Alex Wojciechowicz	C–DT	1946–1950	1968	92	**Reggie White**	DE	1985–1992	2006
35	**Pete Pihos**	TE–DE	1947–1955	1970	85	Art Monk	WR	1995	2008
11	**Norm Van Brocklin**	QB	1958–1960	1971	95	Richard Dent	DE	1997	2011
56	Bill Hewitt	DE-FB	1937–1939, 1943	1971	80	Cris Carter	WR	1987–1989	2013
33	Ollie Matson	RB	1964–1966	1972	87	Claude Humphrey	DE	1979–1981	2014
54	Jim Ringo	C	1964–1967	1981	20	**Brian Dawkins**	S	1996–2008	2018
9	**Sonny Jurgensen**	QB	1957–1963	1983	81	Terrell Owens	WR	2004–2005	2018
98, 89	Mike Ditka	TE	1967–1968	1988	17	**Harold Carmichael**	WR	1971–1983	2020
86	Bud Grant	WR–DE	1951–1952	1994	21	**Eric Allen**	CB	1988–1994	2025
25	**Tommy McDonald**	WR	1957–1963	1998					
Coaches and executives
Name		Positions			Seasons			Inducted	
**Bert Bell**		Owner/founder			1933–1940			1963	
**Earle "Greasy" Neale**		Head coach			1941–1950			1969	
**Dick Vermeil**		Head coach			1976–1982			2022	

=== Eagles Hall of Fame ===
In 1987, the Eagles Honor Roll was established. Every Eagles player who had been elected into the Pro Football Hall of Fame at that point was among the inaugural induction class. By 2012, the Honor Roll had been retitled as the Eagles Hall of Fame. Players are considered for induction three years after their retirement from the NFL. There have been 55 inductees into the Eagles Hall of Fame as of 2026.

Elected to the Pro Football Hall of Fame

**Eagles Hall of Fame**
Year	No.	Name	Position(s)	Tenure
1987	60	Chuck Bednarik	C–LB	1949–1962
1987	–	Bert Bell	Founder/owner	1933–1940
1987	17	Harold Carmichael	WR	1971–1983
1987	56	Bill Hewitt	TE–DE	1936–1939, 1943
1987	9	Sonny Jurgensen	QB	1957–1963
1987	33	Ollie Matson	RB	1964–1966
1987	31	Wilbert Montgomery	RB	1977–1984
1987	–	Earle "Greasy" Neale	Head coach	1941–1950
1987	35	Pete Pihos	TE–DE	1947–1955
1987	54	Jim Ringo	C	1964–1967
1987	11	Norm Van Brocklin	QB	1958–1960
1987	15	Steve Van Buren	HB	1944–1951
1987	53	Alex Wojciechowicz	C–DT	1946–1950
1988	66	Bill Bergey	LB	1974–1980
1988	25	Tommy McDonald	WR	1957–1963
1989	40	Tom Brookshier	CB	1953–1961
1989	44	Pete Retzlaff	TE	1956–1966
1990	22	Timmy Brown	RB	1960–1967
1991	76	Jerry Sisemore	OT	1973–1987
1991	75	Stan Walters	OT	1975–1983
1992	7	Ron Jaworski	QB	1977–1986
1993	28	Bill Bradley	S–P	1969–1976
1994	–	Dick Vermeil	Head coach	1976–1982
1995	–	Jim Gallagher	Team executive	1949–1995
1995	82	Mike Quick	WR	1982–1990
1996	99	Jerome Brown	DT	1987–1991
1999	–	Otho Davis	Head Trainer	1973–1995
1999	1948 NFL Championship team			
1999	1949 NFL Championship team			
2004	76	Bob Brown	OT	1964–1968
2005	92	Reggie White	DE	1985–1992
2009	70	Al Wistert	OT	1943–1951
2009	12	Randall Cunningham	QB–P	1985–1995
2011	21	Eric Allen	CB	1988–1994
2011	–	Jim Johnson	Defensive coordinator	1999–2008
2012	–	Leo Carlin	Ticket manager	1960–1982, 1985–2015
2012	20	Brian Dawkins	S	1996–2008
2012	23	Troy Vincent	CB	1996–2003
2013	5	Donovan McNabb	QB	1999–2009
2015	36	Brian Westbrook	RB	2002–2009
2015	55	Maxie Baughan	LB	1960–1965
2016	54	Jeremiah Trotter	LB	1998–2001, 2004–2006, 2009
2016	–	Merrill Reese	Radio play-by-play	1977–present
2017	2	David Akers	K	1999–2010
2018	59	Seth Joyner	LB	1986–1993
2018	96	Clyde Simmons	DE	1986–1993
2019	83	Bobby Walston	WR–TE–K	1951–1962
2021	72	Tra Thomas	OT	1998–2008
2021	69	Jon Runyan	OT	2000–2008
2022	53	Hugh Douglas	DE	1998–2002, 2004
2022	58	Trent Cole	DE, OLB	2005–2014
2024	25	LeSean McCoy	RB	2009–2014
2025	27	Malcolm Jenkins	S	2014–2019
2025	76	Bucko Kilroy	OG	1943–1955
2026	–	Jeffrey Lurie	Owner	1994–present

=== 75th Anniversary Team ===
Elected to the Pro Football Hall of Fame

Position	Player	Seasons
Offense
QB	Donovan McNabb	1999–2009
RB	Steve Van Buren	1944–1951
FB	Keith Byars	1986–1992
WR	Harold Carmichael	1971–1983
WR	Tommy McDonald	1957–1963
TE	Pete Pihos	1947–1955
LT	Tra Thomas	1998–2008
LG	Wade Key	1970–1979
C	Chuck Bednarik	1949–1962
RG	Shawn Andrews	2004–2009
RT	Jon Runyan	2000–2008
Defense
DE	Clyde Simmons	1986–1993
DE	Reggie White	1985–1992
DT	Jerome Brown	1987–1991
DT	Charlie Johnson	1977–1981
OLB	Seth Joyner	1986–1993
OLB	Alex Wojciechowicz	1946–1950
MLB	Chuck Bednarik	1949–1962
CB	Eric Allen	1988–1994
CB	Troy Vincent	1996–2003
FS	Brian Dawkins	1996–2008
SS	Andre Waters	1984–1993
Special teams
K	David Akers	1999–2010
P	Sean Landeta	1999–2002, 2005
KR	Timmy Brown	1960–1967
PR	Brian Westbrook	2002–2009
ST	Vince Papale	1976–1979
Coach
HC	Andy Reid	1999–2012

== Franchise records ==
The following players below have franchise records for the Eagles:

=== Passing ===
Statistic	Regular season			Playoffs			Rookie	
Statistic	Career	Season	Game	Career	Season	Game	Season	Game
Completions	2,801; Donovan McNabb	388; Carson Wentz; 2019	37; Mark Sanchez; 2014-12-20 @WAS; Sam Bradford; 2015-12-26 WAS	341; Donovan McNabb	73; Donovan McNabb; 2008	30; Donovan McNabb; 2005-02-06 NNWE	379; Carson Wentz; 2016	36; Carson Wentz; 2016-12-04 @CIN
Pass attempts	4,746; Donovan McNabb	607; Carson Wentz; 2016, 2019	62; Randall Cunningham; 1989-10-02 @CHI; Nick Foles; 2014-10-26 @ARI	577; Donovan McNabb	121; Donovan McNabb; 2008	54; Randall Cunningham; 1988-12-31 @CHI	607; Carson Wentz; 2016	60; Carson Wentz; 2016-12-04 @CIN
Passing yards	32,873; Donovan McNabb	4,039; Carson Wentz; 2019	471; Nick Foles; 2018-12-23 HOU	3,752; Donovan McNabb	892; Donovan McNabb; 2008	407; Randall Cunningham; 1988-12-31 @CHI	3,782; Carson Wentz; 2016	381; Nick Foles; 2012-12-09 @TAM
Passing TDs	216; Donovan McNabb	33; Carson Wentz; 2017	7 Nick Foles; 2013-11-03 @OAK	24; Donovan McNabb	7 Donovan McNabb; 2004	3 Ron Jaworski; 1979-12-23 CHI; Rodney Peete; 1995-12-30 DET; Donovan McNabb; 2005-02-06 NNWE; 2009-01-18 @ARI; Nick Foles; 2018-01-21 MIN; 2018-02-04 NNWE	16; Carson Wentz; 2016	3 Scott Tinsley; 1987-10-11 @DAL; Donovan McNabb; 2000-01-02 STL; Jalen Hurts; 2020-12-20 @ARI
Intercepted	151; Ron Jaworski	26; Sonny Jurgensen; 1962	6 Bobby Thomason; 1956-10-21 CRD; Pete Liske; 1971-09-26 DAL	17; Donovan McNabb	7 Ron Jaworski; 1980	3 Ron Jaworski; 1981-01-25 NOAK; Randall Cunningham; 1988-12-31 @CHI; Donovan McNabb; 2004-01-18 CAR; 2005-02-06 NNWE	17; Davey O'Brien; 1939	4 Randall Cunningham; 1985-09-15 RAM; Scott Tinsley; 1987-10-18 @GNB; Brad Goebel; 1991-10-13 NOR
Passer rating	94.2+ Nick Foles	119.2# Nick Foles; 2013	158.3*; Donovan McNabb; 2007-09-23 DET; Nick Foles; 2013-11-03 @OAK	83.6# Jeff Garcia	132.4*; Rodney Peete; 1995	143.3*; Rodney Peete; 1995-12-30 DET	79.3# Carson Wentz; 2016	131.7*; Scott Tinsley; 1987-10-11 @DAL
Sacked	422; Randall Cunningham	72; Randall Cunningham; 1986	12; Donovan McNabb; 2007-09-30 @NYG	48; Donovan McNabb	12; Donovan McNabb; 2003	8 Donovan McNabb; 2004-01-11 GNB	38; John Reaves; 1972	7 Randall Cunningham; 1985-09-29 NYG
Yards per pass att.	8.71+ Sonny Jurgensen	9.12# Nick Foles; 2013	16.29*; Sonny Jurgensen; 1962-11-25 DAL	6.5# Donovan McNabb; Randall Cunningham	10.2*; Norm Van Brocklin; 1960	10.8*; Rodney Peete; 1995-12-30 DET	6.73# John Reaves; 1972	12.47*; Randall Cunningham; 1985-09-22 @WAS
Pass yards per game	266.1+ Sam Bradford	278.6# Donovan McNabb; 2005	—	234.5# Donovan McNabb	407*; Randall Cunningham; 1988	—	242.7# Nick Foles; 2012	—

+ = min. 500 attempts, # = min. 100 attempts, ∗ = minimum 15 attempts,

=== Rushing ===
Statistic	Regular season			Playoffs			Rookie	
Statistic	Career	Season	Game	Career	Season	Game	Season	Game
Rush attempts	1,465; Wilbert Montgomery	353; Ricky Watters; 1996	35; Heath Sherman; 1990-11-12 WAS	141; Wilbert Montgomery	91; Saquon Barkley; 2024	26; Wilbert Montgomery; 1979-12-23 CHI; 1981-01-03 MIN; 1981-01-11 DAL; Saquon Barkley; 2025-01-19 LAR	182; Po James; 1972	28; Charlie Garner; 1994-10-09 WAS
Rush yards	6,792; LeSean McCoy	2,005; Saquon Barkley; 2024	255; Saquon Barkley; 2024-11-24 @LAR	591; Brian Westbrook	499; Saquon Barkley; 2024	205; Saquon Barkley; 2025-01-19 LAR	818; Miles Sanders; 2019	178; Bryce Brown; 2012-11-26 CAR
Rush yards per attempt	6.62; Randall Cunningham	7.98; Randall Cunningham; 1990	11.63; Timmy Brown; 1965-11-07 @CLE	5.86; Donovan McNabb	7.79; Brian Westbrook; 2006	7.88; Saquon Barkley; 2025-01-19 LAR	4.9; Bryce Brown; 2012	9.37; Bryce Brown; 2012-11-26 CAR
Rushing TDs	69; Steve Van Buren	17; LeSean McCoy; 2011	3 Wilbert Montgomery; 1979-10-07 WAS; 1982-12-19 HOU; LeSean McCoy; 2010-09-19 @DET	10; Jalen Hurts	5 Jalen Hurts; 2024	3 Jalen Hurts; 2023-02-12 KC; 2025-01-26 WAS; Saquon Barkley; 2025-01-26 WAS	4 Ken Keller; 1956; LeSean McCoy; 2009; Bryce Brown; 2012	2 Wilbert Montgomery; 1977-12-18 NYJ; James Joseph; 1991-11-04 NYG; Charlie Garner; 1994-10-02 @SFO; Bryce Brown; 2012-11-26 CAR; 2012-12-02 @DAL
Rush yards per game	79; Ricky Watters	125.3; Saquon Barkley; 2024	—	74; Wilbert Montgomery	128.5; Brian Westbrook; 2006	—	70.1; Mike Hogan; 1976	—

∗ = minimum 15 attempts, # = min. 100 attempts, + = min. 500 attempts

=== Receiving ===
Statistic	Regular season			Playoffs			Rookie	
Statistic	Career	Season	Game	Career	Season	Game	Season	Game
Receptions	589; Harold Carmichael	116; Zach Ertz; 2018	14; Zach Ertz; 2018-11-11 DAL	43; DeVonta Smith	19; Brent Celek; 2008	10; Brent Celek; 2009-01-18 @ARI	81; Keith Jackson; 1988	11; Junior Tautalatasi; 1986-11-09 NYG
Receiving yards	8,978; Harold Carmichael	1,496; A. J. Brown; 2022	237; Tommy McDonald; 1961-12-10 NYG	595; DeVonta Smith	219; Alshon Jeffery; 2018	146; Jeremy Maclin; 2010-01-09 @DAL	916; DeVonta Smith; 2021	177; Hank Baskett; 2006-12-31 ATL
Yards per reception	19.16+ Tommy McDonald	21.44# Ben Hawkins; 1967	52.5*; DeSean Jackson; 2010-12-12 @DAL	16.03# Harold Carmichael	23.5*; Donte' Stallworth; 2006	30.5*; Kevin Curtis; 2009-01-18 @ARI	21.09 #Hank Baskett; 2006	28.5*; Fred Barnett; 1990-10-15 MIN
Receiving TDs	79; Harold Carmichael	14; Terrell Owens; 2004	4 Ben Hawkins; 1969-09-28 PIT	6 Harold Carmichael	3 Harold Carmichael; 1979; Brent Celek; 2008; Alshon Jeffery; 2018	2 Harold Carmichael; 1979-12-23 CHI; Fred Barnett; 1993-01-03 @NOR; Chad Lewis; 2005-01-23 ATL; Brent Celek; 2009-01-18 @ARI; Alshon Jeffery; 2018-01-21 MIN	9 Calvin Williams; 1990	2 (9 times)
Rec yards per game	70.3+ DeSean Jackson	90.4# Ben Hawkins; 1967	—	66.11# DeVonta Smith	146*; Jeremy Maclin; 2009	—	64.3# Don Looney; 1940	—

∗ = minimum 4 receptions, # = min. 20 receptions, + = min. 200 receptions

=== Other ===
Statistic	Regular season			Playoffs			Rookie	
Statistic	Career	Season	Game	Career	Season	Game	Season	Game
Total TDs	79; Harold Carmichael	20; LeSean McCoy; 2011	4 Ben Hawkins; 1969-09-28 PIT; Wilbert Montgomery; 1978-09-10 @WAS; 1979-10-07 WAS; Brian Westbrook; 2008-11-27 ARI	10; Jalen Hurts	5 Jalen Hurts 2024	3 Jalen Hurts; 2023-02-12 KC; 2025-01-26 WAS; Saquon Barkley; 2025-01-26 WAS	9 Calvin Williams; 1990	3 Corey Clement; 2017-11-05 DEN
Yards from scrimmage	9,785; Brian Westbrook	2,283; Saquon Barkley; 2024	302; Saquon Barkley; 2024-11-24 @LAR	925; Brian Westbrook	574; Saquon Barkley; 2024	232; Saquon Barkley; 2025-01-19 LAR	1,327; Miles Sanders; 2019	189; Bryce Brown; 2012-11-26 CAR
All-purpose yards	12,049; Timmy Brown	2,428; Timmy Brown; 1963	341; Timmy Brown; 1962-12-16 @STL	953; Brian Westbrook	574; Saquon Barkley; 2024	232; Saquon Barkley; 2025-01-19 LAR	1,673; Miles Sanders; 2019	231; Kevin Bowman; 1987-10-11 @DAL

=== Returning ===
Statistic	Regular season			Playoffs		
Statistic	Career	Season	Game	Career	Season	Game
Kick returns	169; Timmy Brown	54; Allen Rossum; 1999	8 Derrick Witherspoon; 1996-11-24 @ARI; Allen Rossum; 1999-11-21 IND; Quintin Demps; 2008-11-09 NYG	22; Brian Mitchell	11; Brian Mitchell; 2001	6 Brian Mitchell; 2002-01-27 @STL
Kick ret yards	4,483; Timmy Brown	1,347; Allen Rossum; 1999	253; Derrick Witherspoon; 1996-11-24 @ARI	522; Brian Mitchell	239; Brian Mitchell; 2001	128; Brian Mitchell; 2002-01-27 @STL
Yards per kick return	27.74; Josh Huff	33.25; Steve Van Buren; 1944		25.29; J. R. Reed	26.8; Brian Mitchell; 2002	31.25; Brian Mitchell; 2003-01-19 TAM
Kick ret TDs	5 Timmy Brown	2 Timmy Brown; 1966; Derrick Witherspoon; 1996	2 Timmy Brown; 1966-11-06 DAL	0		
Punt returns	148; Wally Henry	54; Wally Henry; 1981	9 Larry Marshall; 1977-09-18 TAM	16; Brian Mitchell	9 Cooper Dejean2024	6 John Sciarra; 1981-01-11 DAL
Punt ret yards	1,369; Brian Mitchell	567; Brian Mitchell; 2002	140; Alvin Haymond; 1968-10-06 @WAS	174; DeSean Jackson	122; DeSean Jackson; 2008	109; DeSean Jackson; 2009-01-04 @MIN
Yards per punt return	14.71; Ernie Steele	20.44; Ernie Steele; 1942	33; Brian Mitchell; 2002-11-25 @SFO	15.82; DeSean Jackson	17.43; DeSean Jackson; 2008	21.8; DeSean Jackson; 2009-01-04 @MIN
Punt ret TDs	4 DeSean Jackson; Darren Sproles	2 Brian Westbrook; 2003; DeSean Jackson; 2009; Darren Sproles; 2014, 2015	1 (8 times)	0		
Total return yards	4,997; Timmy Brown	1,729; Brian Mitchell; 2002	234; Vai Sikahema; 1992-11-22 @NYG	657; Brian Mitchell	296; Brian Mitchell; 2001	159; Brian Mitchell; 2003-01-19 TAM

=== Defense ===
Statistic	Regular season			Playoffs		
Statistic	Career	Season	Game	Career	Season	Game
Interceptions	34; Bill Bradley; Brian Dawkins; Eric Allen	11; Bill Bradley; 1971	3 Don Burroughs; 1961-12-03 @PIT; Nate Ramsey; 1965-11-28 @STL; Jim Nettles; 1965-12-12 @PIT; Joe Scarpati; 1966-10-23 @NYG	5 Herm Edwards	3 Roynell Young; 1980; Damon Moore; 2001	2 Herm Edwards; 1981-01-03 MIN; Roynell Young; 1981-01-03 MIN; Eric Allen; 1993-01-03 @NOR; Damon Moore; 2002-01-12 TAM
Int ret yards	536; Bill Bradley	248; Bill Bradley; 1971	114; Frank LeMaster; 1975-12-21 @WAS	77; Damon Moore	77; Damon Moore; 2001	59; Damon Moore; 2002-01-12 TAM
Int ret TDs	5 Eric Allen	4 Eric Allen; 1993	2 Eric Allen; 1993-12-26 NOR	1 (7 times)		
Sacks (since 1982)	124; Reggie White	21; Reggie White; 1987	4.5; Clyde Simmons; 1991-09-15 @DAL; Hugh Douglas; 1998-10-18 @SDG	4.5; Nolan Smith	4 Nolan Smith; 2024	2.5; Josh Sweat; 2025-02-09 KC

=== Exceptional performances ===
Statistic	Career	Season	Playoff games	Rookie games
300+ yard passing games	30; Donovan McNabb	6 Donovan McNabb; 2004	3 Donovan McNabb	4 Carson Wentz; 2016
100+ yard rushing games	26; Wilbert Montgomery	11; Saquon Barkley; 2024	3 Saquon Barkley	2 Don Johnson; 1953; Mike Hogan; 1976; Charlie Garner; 1994; Bryce Brown; 2012
100+ yard receiving games	23; Pete Retzlaff	8 Terrell Owens; 2004	2 Fred Barnett; Keith Jackson	4 Charle Young; 1973
Games with 2+ TD scored	18; Brian Westbrook	6 LeSean McCoy; 2011; Saquon Barkley; 2024	2 Wilbert Montgomery Saquon Barkley; Jalen Hurts	2 Bryce Brown; 2012; Jordan Matthews; 2014
Games with 3+ TD scored	7 Brian Westbrook	2 Pete Retzlaff; 1965; Wilbert Montgomery; 1982; Terrell Owens; 2004; Brian Westbrook; 2007, 2008	1 Saquon Barkley; Jalen Hurts	—

== Staff ==
=== Current staff ===
Philadelphia Eagles staff
Front office: Chairman/CEO – Jeffrey Lurie; President – Don Smolenski; General manager/executive vice president – Howie Roseman; Assistant general manager – Adam Berry, Jon Ferrari; Senior advisor to the general manager/chief security officer – Dom DiSandro; Head of football development and strategy – Connor Barwin; Senior vice president of player personnel – Joe Douglas; Vice president of football operations and strategic initiatives – Alan Wolking; Vice president of player personnel – Charles Walls, Phil Bhaya; Senior personnel director/advisor to the general manager – Matt Russell; Director of player personnel – Jeremy Gray; Director of football operations/pro scout – Ameena Soliman; Director of football administration – Grant Reiter; Senior director of football analytics and strategy – James Gilman; Director of football analytics – Jonathan Liu; Director of football research and strategy – Zachary Steever; Assistant director of personnel strategy – Zach Drapkin; Director of college scouting – Ryan Myers; Assistant director of college scouting – Matt Holland; Assistant director of pro scouting – Lee DiValerio, Jarrod Kilburn; Personnel executive – Mike Maccagnan; Head coaches: Head coach – Nick Sirianni; Assistant head coach/running backs – Jemal Singleton; Associate head coach/senior defensive assistant/defensive line – Clint Hurtt; Offensive coaches: Offensive coordinator – Sean Mannion; Pass game coordinator – Josh Grizzard; Quarterbacks – Parks Frazier; Wide receivers – Aaron Moorehead; Run game coordinator/tight ends – Ryan Mahaffey; Offensive line – Chris Kuper; Assistant offensive line – Greg Austin; Senior offensive assistant/special projects – Jerrod Johnson; Offensive assistant/assistant quarterbacks – Montgomery VanGorder; Offensive assistant/assistant tight ends – Eric Dickerson	Defensive coaches: Defensive coordinator – Vic Fangio; Defensive ends/outside linebackers – Jeremiah Washburn; Inside linebackers – Bobby King; Assistant linebackers – Tyler Scudder; Defensive pass game coordinator – Joe Kasper; Secondary – Mike Pellegrino; Cornerbacks – Roy Anderson; Defensive assistant – Beyah Rasool; Defensive assistant – Allen Smith; Special teams coaches: Special teams coordinator – Michael Clay; Assistant special teams coordinator/director of team relationships – Joe Pannunzio; Special teams assistant – Tyler Brown; Strength and conditioning: Head athletic trainer – Tom Hunkele; Head strength and conditioning – Fernando Noriega; → Coaching staff → Front office → More NFL staffs

== Radio and television ==
=== Eagles radio affiliates ===
==== Pennsylvania ====
City	Call sign	Frequency
Easton	WCTO	96.1 FM
Levittown	WBCB	1490 AM
Philadelphia	WIP-FM	94.1 FM
Pottsville	WPPA	1360 AM
Reading	WEEU	830 AM
Scranton	WEJL	630 AM
Sunbury	WEGH	107.3 FM
Williamsport	WBZD-FM	93.3 FM
York	WSOX	96.1 FM

==== Delaware ====
City	Call sign	Frequency
Milford	WAFL	97.7 FM
Wilmington	WDEL	1150 AM

==== New Jersey ====
City	Call sign	Frequency
Atlantic City	WPGG	1450 AM
Canton	WDEL-FM	101.7 FM
Millville	WENJ	97.3 FM

From 2008 through 2010, Eagles games were broadcast on both rock-formatted WYSP and sports-talk Sports Radio 610 WIP, as both stations were owned and operated by CBS Radio. In 2011, CBS dropped the music on WYSP, renaming it WIP-FM and making it a full simulcast of WIP. By 2020, 610 WIP had changed call letters to WTEL and rebranded to the Philadelphia affiliate for the Black Information Network, while WIP-FM broadcast all Eagles games. In 2017, the Eagles extended their broadcasting contract with WIP-FM through 2024.

Merrill Reese, who joined the Eagles in 1976, is the play-by-play announcer, and former Eagles wide receiver Mike Quick, who replaced offense lineman Stan Walters beginning in 1998, is the color analyst. The post-game show, which has consisted of many Philadelphia sports personalities, as of the 2014 season is hosted by Kevin Riley, a former Eagles linebacker and special-teamer, and Rob Ellis. Riley was the former post-game host for the show on 94 WYSP before the WIP change over; Rob Ellis hosts a weekly show nightly from 6–10 on 94.1 WIP-FM.

Spanish language broadcasts are on WEMG Mega 105.7FM with Rickie Ricardo on play-by-play, and Oscar Budejen as color commentator.

In 2015, the preseason games were being televised on WCAU, the local NBC owned and operated station.

During the regular season, games are governed by the NFL's master broadcasting contract with Fox, CBS, NBC, and ESPN. Most games can be seen on Fox-owned WTXF-TV. When hosting an AFC team, those games can be seen on CBS-owned KYW-TV.

== Training camp ==
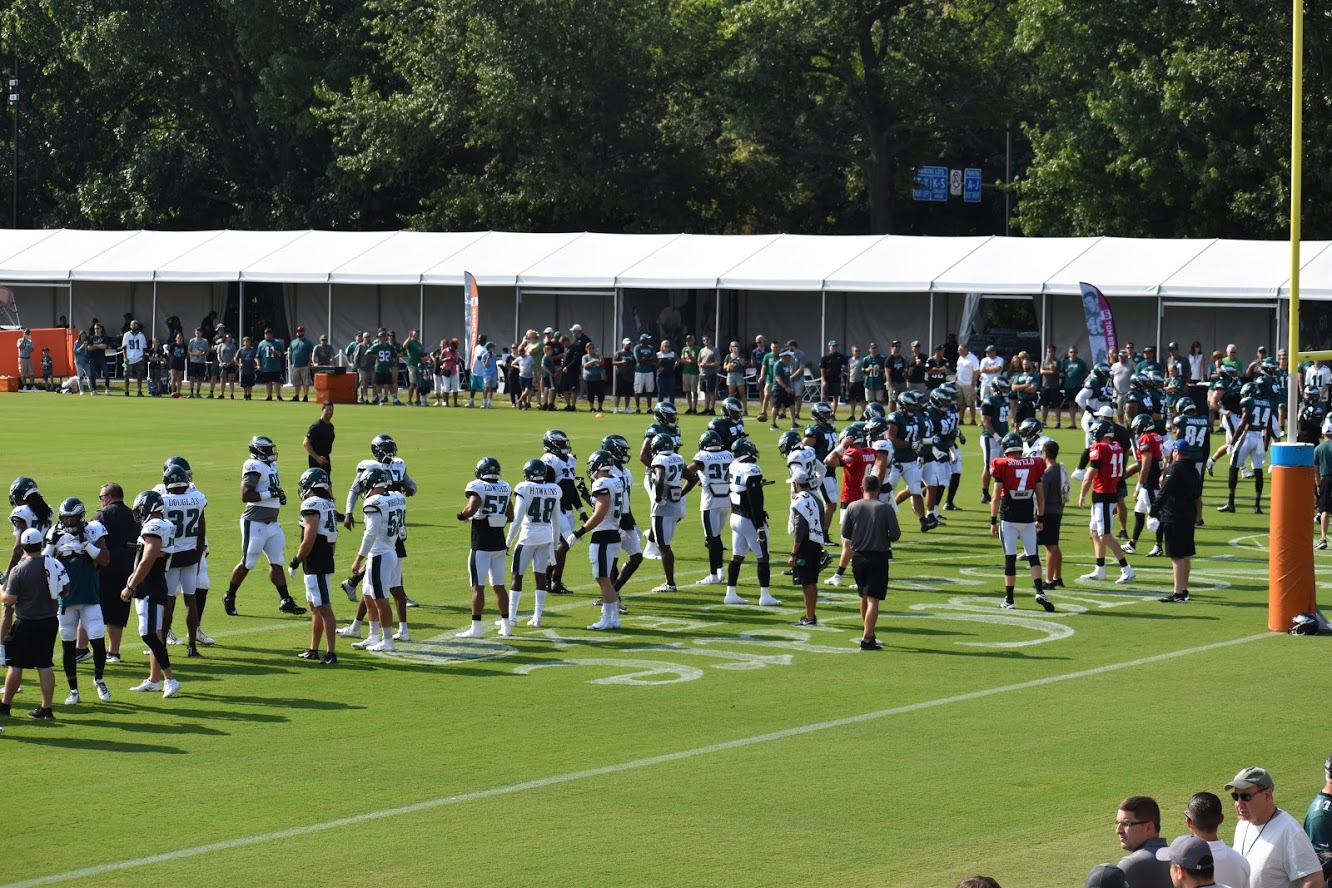
Philadelphia Eagles training camp at the NovaCare Complex in South Philadelphia in 2019

The Eagles previously held their preseason training camp from the end of July through mid-August each year at Lehigh University in Bethlehem in the Lehigh Valley. In 2013, with the addition of head coach Chip Kelly, the Eagles moved their training camp to the NovaCare Complex (renamed to the Jefferson Health Training Complex in 2026) in Philadelphia. Training camps were previously held at Chestnut Hill Academy in 1935, Saint Joseph's University in 1939 and 1943, Saranac Lake from 1946 to 1948, Hershey from 1951 to 1967, Albright College from 1968 to 1972, Widener University from 1973 to 1979, and West Chester University from 1980 to 1995.

== Fight song ==
This fight song is heard during Eagles' home games after touchdowns and before the team is introduced prior to kickoff.

== Eagles' cheerleaders ==
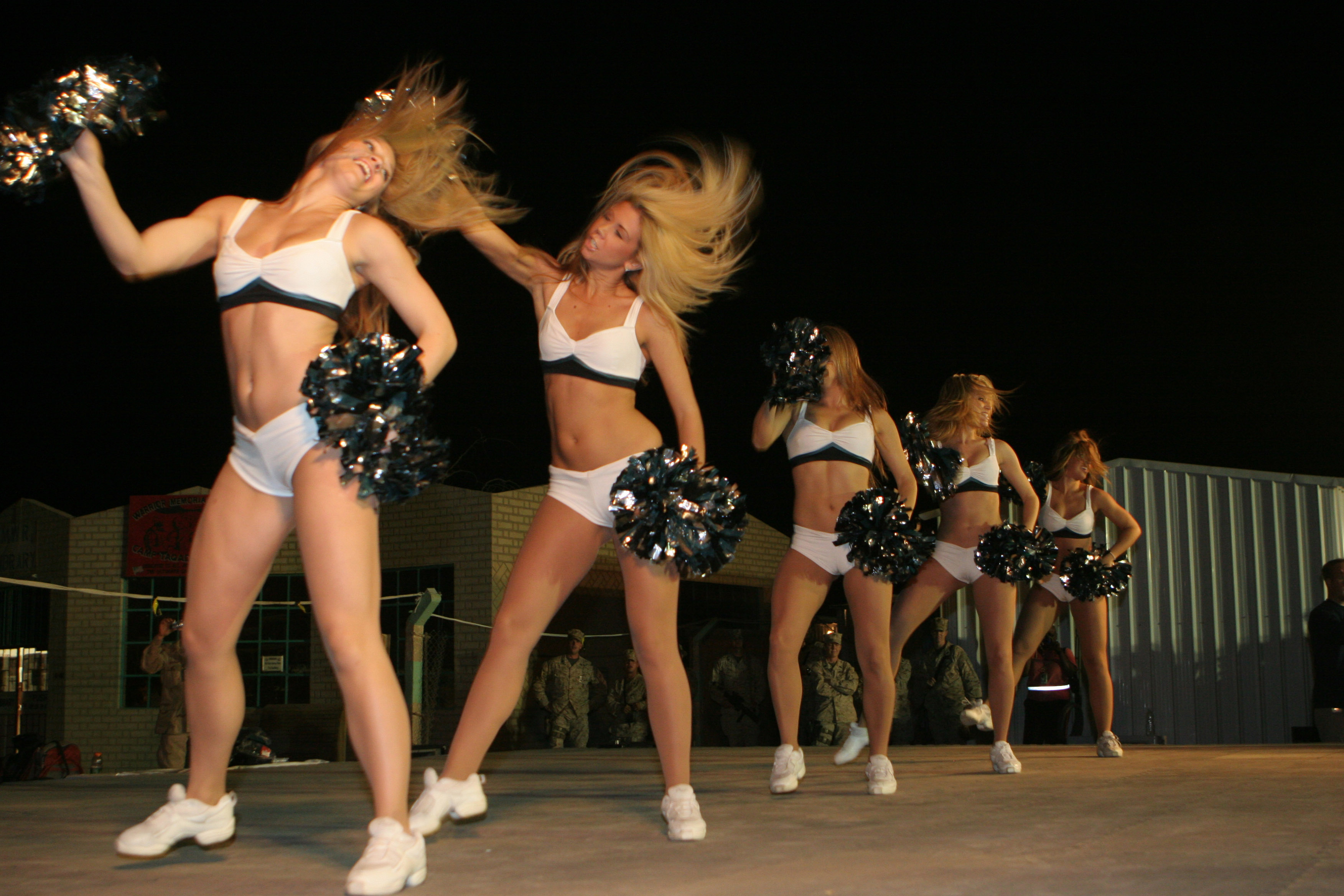
Philadelphia Eagles Cheerleaders in 2008

The Eagles have their own cheerleading squad, which performs a variety of dance routines for the fans and the Eagles on the sideline. The squad also releases a swimsuit calendar each year, and is the first squad in the league to release the calendar on the Android and iOS mobile systems.

== Fans ==
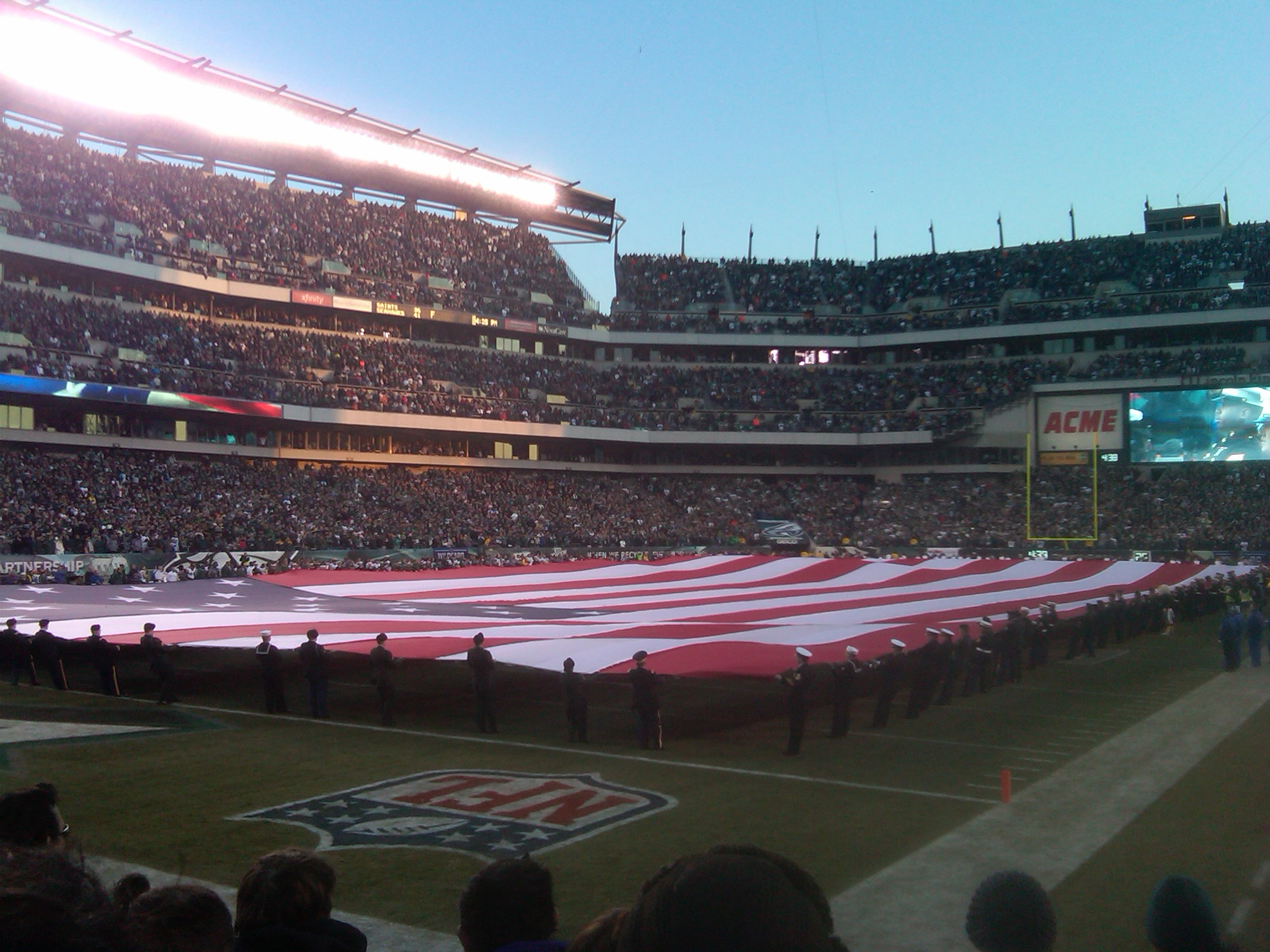
A full house at The Linc for an NFC playoff game against the Green Bay Packers on January 9, 2011

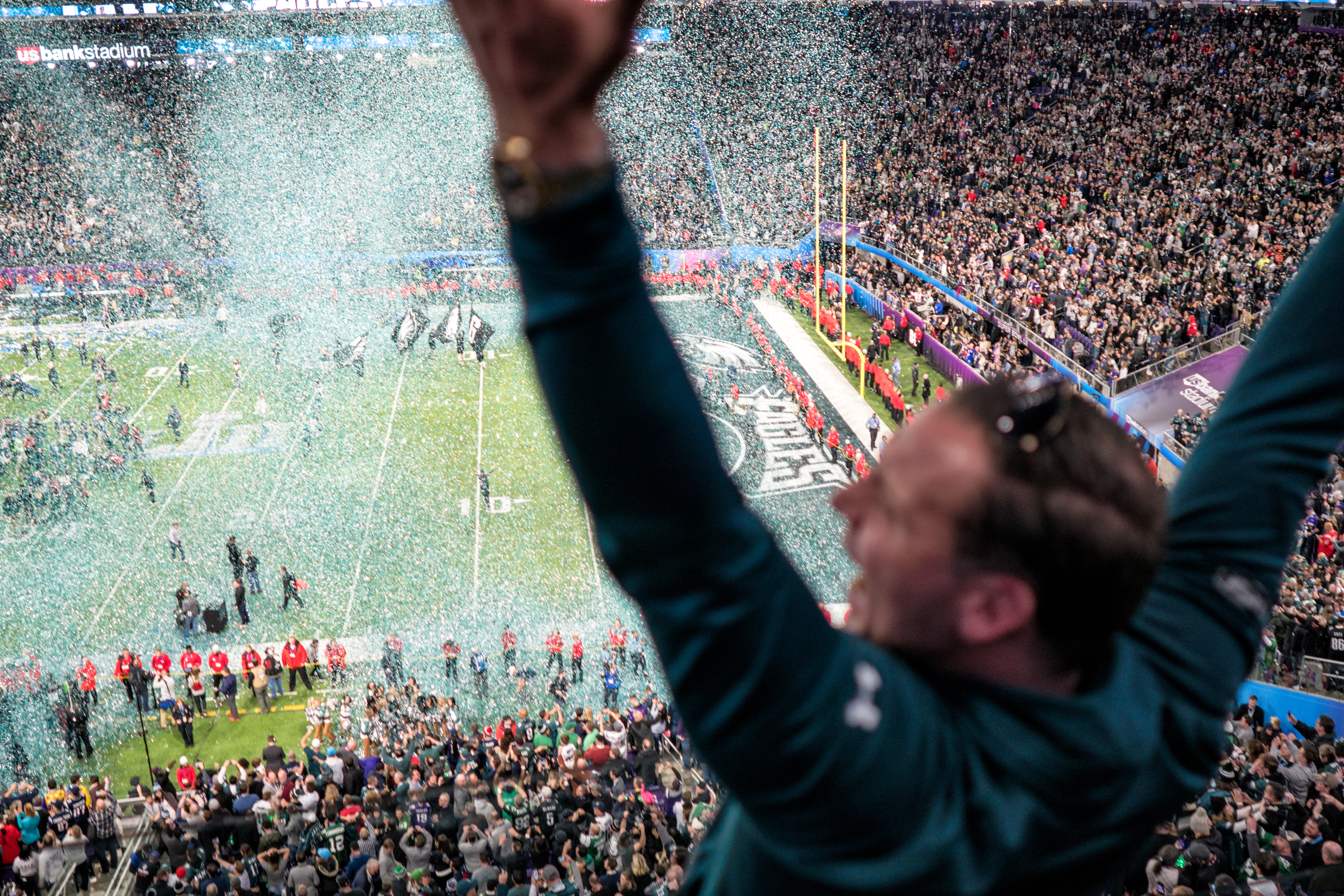
An Eagles fan celebrating the Eagles. victory in Super Bowl LII at U.S. Bank Stadium on February 4, 2018

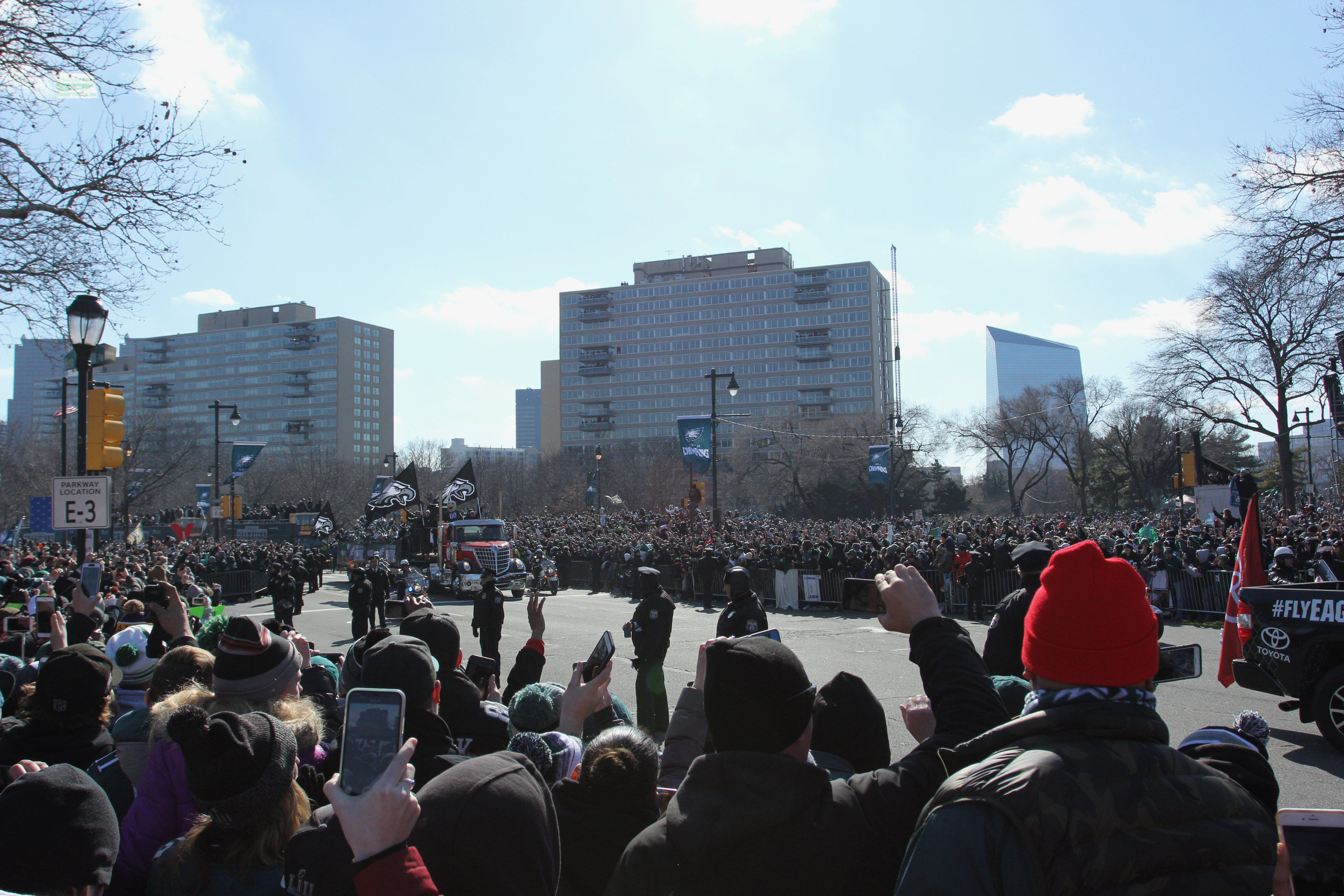
Eagles fans celebrate along Benjamin Franklin Parkway at the Eagles' Super Bowl victory parade in Center City Philadelphia on February 8, 2018

=== Devotion ===
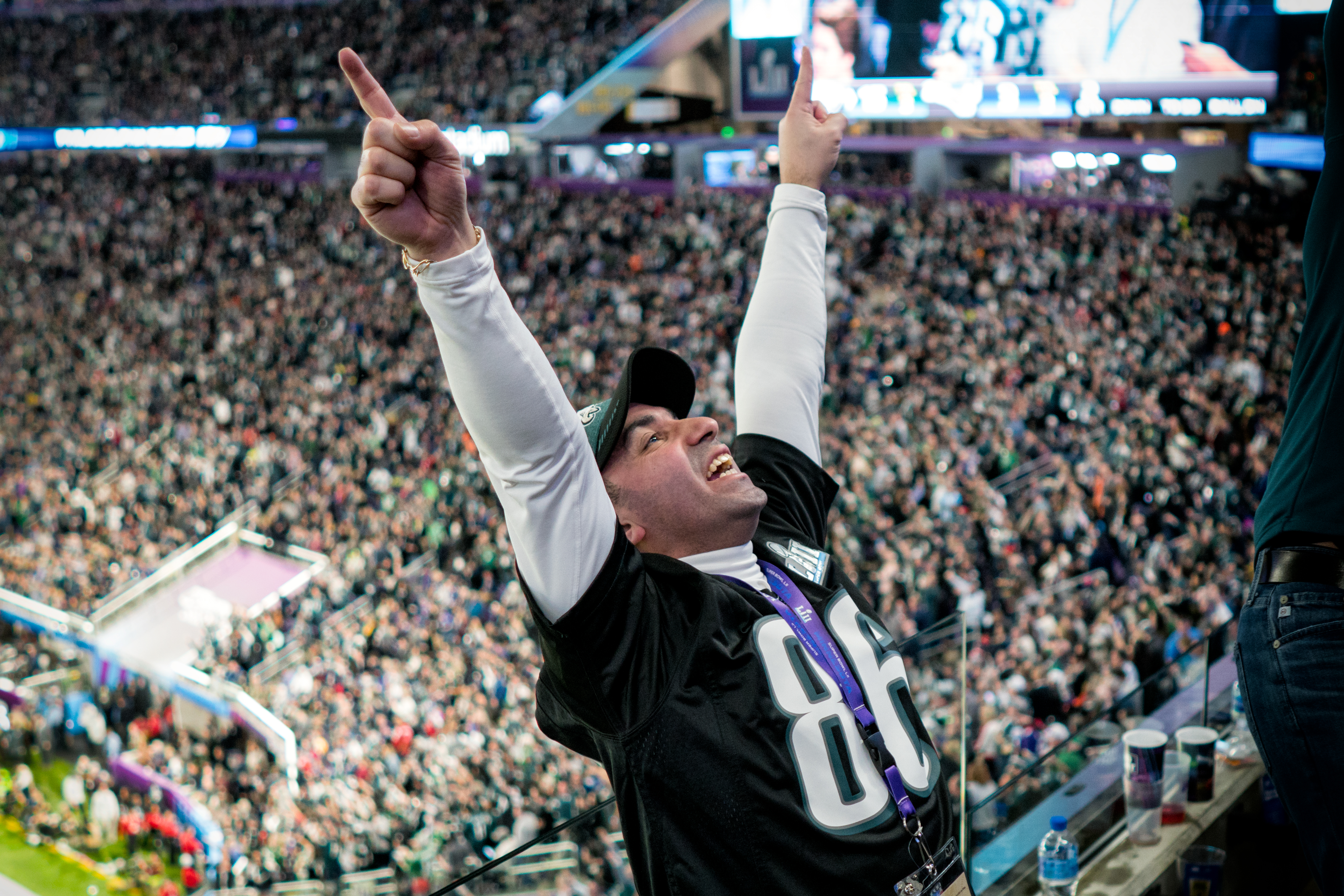
A Philadelphia Eagles fan celebrating at the Super Bowl LII in Minneapolis

Although the method may vary, studies that attempt to rank the 32 fan bases in the NFL consistently place Eagles fans among the best in the league, noting their "unmatched fervor". American City Business Journals, which conducts a regular study to determine the most loyal fans in the NFL, ranked Eagles fans third in both 1999 and 2006. The 2006 study called Eagles fans "incredibly loyal", noting that they filled 99.8% of the seats in the stadium over the previous decade. Forbes placed the Eagles fans first in its 2008 survey, which was based on the correlation between team performance and fan attendance. ESPN.com placed Eagles fans fourth in the league in its 2008 survey, citing the connection between the team's performance and the mood of the city. The last home game that was blacked out on television in the Philadelphia market as a result of not being sold out was against the Arizona Cardinals on Sunday, September 12, 1999, which was Andy Reid's first home game as new head coach of the Eagles.

The studies note that, whether the Eagles have winning or losing teams, fans can be counted on to pack the stadium each year. As of August 2008, the team had sold out 71 consecutive games, and 70,000 additional fans were on the Eagles' waiting list for season tickets. Despite finishing with a 6–10 record in the 2005 season, the Eagles ranked second in the NFL in merchandise sales, and single-game tickets for the next season were sold out minutes after phone and Internet lines opened.

Eagles fans have also been known to chant the famous, "E-A-G-L-E-S – Eagles!" at Flyers, Phillies, and 76ers games when the team is getting blown out late in a game and a loss is inevitable, signifying their displeasure with the given team's performance, and that they are instead putting their hope into the Eagles. Occasionally, travelling Phillies fans may even chant this when the Phillies appear to be a few innings away from an inevitable win on the road as a way to celebrate their team and Philadelphia as a whole. The Eagles and Phillies were both the main tenants at Veterans Stadium before Lincoln Financial Field and Citizens Bank Park were built.

Notable famous fans of the Eagles include actors Bradley Cooper, Rob McElhenney, and Miles Teller, actor and comedian Kevin Hart, Jeopardy! champion Brad Rutter, journalists Jake Tapper and Jesse Watters, morning talk show host Kelly Ripa, TV personality Jim Cramer, and soccer star Carli Lloyd, the latter of whom also appeared at a joint practice of the Eagles with the Baltimore Ravens in 2019 where she nailed a 55-yard field goal attempt. One week later, during an international friendly pitting the United States against Portugal at Lincoln Financial Field, Lloyd celebrated scoring a goal by doing the "E-A-G-L-E-S, Eagles!" chant. The United States ultimately won that match 4–0.

The Eagles also have famous fans from outside of the United States, which include Australian professional wrestler Grayson Waller, who currently wrestles in American pro wrestling promotion WWE (WrestleMania XL, which was held at Lincoln Financial Field itself, saw Waller don Eagles-themed ring gear), and Andrea Bain, a Canadian talk show host best known for her work as one of the four hosts of the lifestyle talk show The Social on Canadian network CTV.

=== Bad behavior ===
Along with their fierce devotion, Eagles fans have a reputation for bad behavior and sports-related violence, especially when the team plays its rivals. One of the most famous incidents occurred in the 1968 season when fans of the struggling 2–11 Eagles pelted snowballs at an incarnation of Santa Claus during a halftime Christmas celebration.

In 2006, HarperCollins published If Football's a Religion, Why Don't We Have a Prayer?, a book by Jereé Longman, in which he describes the fans of the 700 Level at Veterans Stadium as having a reputation for "hostile taunting, fighting, public urination and general strangeness."

A 1997 game against the San Francisco 49ers in Philadelphia featured so many incidents that, beginning at the following home game, the Eagles appointed a judge, Seamus McCaffery, to preside over a temporary courtroom at the stadium; 20 suspects came before him that day. Fan behavior improved after the team's move to Lincoln Financial Field, and "Eagles Court" ended in December 2003.

During a January 2025 home playoff game against the Green Bay Packers, an Eagles fan shouted obscenities at a woman wearing Packers gear; the incident went viral online, leading to the Eagles fan losing his job and receiving a ban from the stadium.

== In popular culture ==
The 1976 Philadelphia Eagles season was the subject of the movie Invincible. The movie stars Mark Wahlberg as Vince Papale, a part-time school teacher and diehard Eagles fan who became an Eagles player. The film differs slightly from true events as the selection process was invitation-only, and Papale had at least some previous playing experience. The film Silver Linings Playbook highlights the 2008 Philadelphia Eagles season, and the novel mentions the 2006 team.

The comedy television series It's Always Sunny in Philadelphia makes several references to the Philadelphia Eagles, most notably on Season 3, Episode 2, "The Gang Gets Invincible", a reference to the 2006 Wahlberg film.

== See also ==
- Forbes' list of the most valuable sports teams
- South Philadelphia Sports Complex
- Sports in Philadelphia

== Sources ==
- Lyons, Robert S. (2010). On Any Given Sunday: A Life of Bert Bell. Philadelphia: Temple University Press. ISBN 978-1-59213-731-2. OCLC 607553558.

Preceded by Chicago Cardinals	NFL champions 1948, 1949	Succeeded by Cleveland Browns
Preceded by Baltimore Colts	NFL champions 1960	Succeeded by Green Bay Packers
Preceded by New England Patriots	Super Bowl champions 2017 (LII)	Succeeded by New England Patriots
Preceded by Kansas City Chiefs	Super Bowl champions 2024 (LIX)	Succeeded by Seattle Seahawks
