= 2024 Philadelphia Eagles season =

92nd season in franchise history; fifth Super Bowl appearance, second Super Bowl win

- Owner: Jeffrey Lurie
- General manager: Howie Roseman
- Head coach: Nick Sirianni
- Offensive coordinator: Kellen Moore
- Defensive coordinator: Vic Fangio
- Home stadium: Lincoln Financial Field

Results
- Record: 14–3
- Division place: 1st NFC East
- Playoffs: Won Wild Card Playoffs (vs. Packers) 22–10; Won Divisional Playoffs (vs. Rams) 28–22; Won NFC Championship (vs. Commanders) 55–23; Won Super Bowl LIX (vs. Chiefs) 40–22
- All-Pros: 6: RB Saquon Barkley (1st team); ILB Zack Baun (1st team); WR A. J. Brown (2nd team); LT Jordan Mailata (2nd team); RT Lane Johnson (2nd team); DT Jalen Carter (2nd team)
- Pro Bowlers: 6: Selected but did not play due to participation in Super Bowl LIX: RB Saquon Barkley; ILB Zack Baun; C Cam Jurgens; G Landon Dickerson; OT Lane Johnson; DT Jalen Carter

Uniform
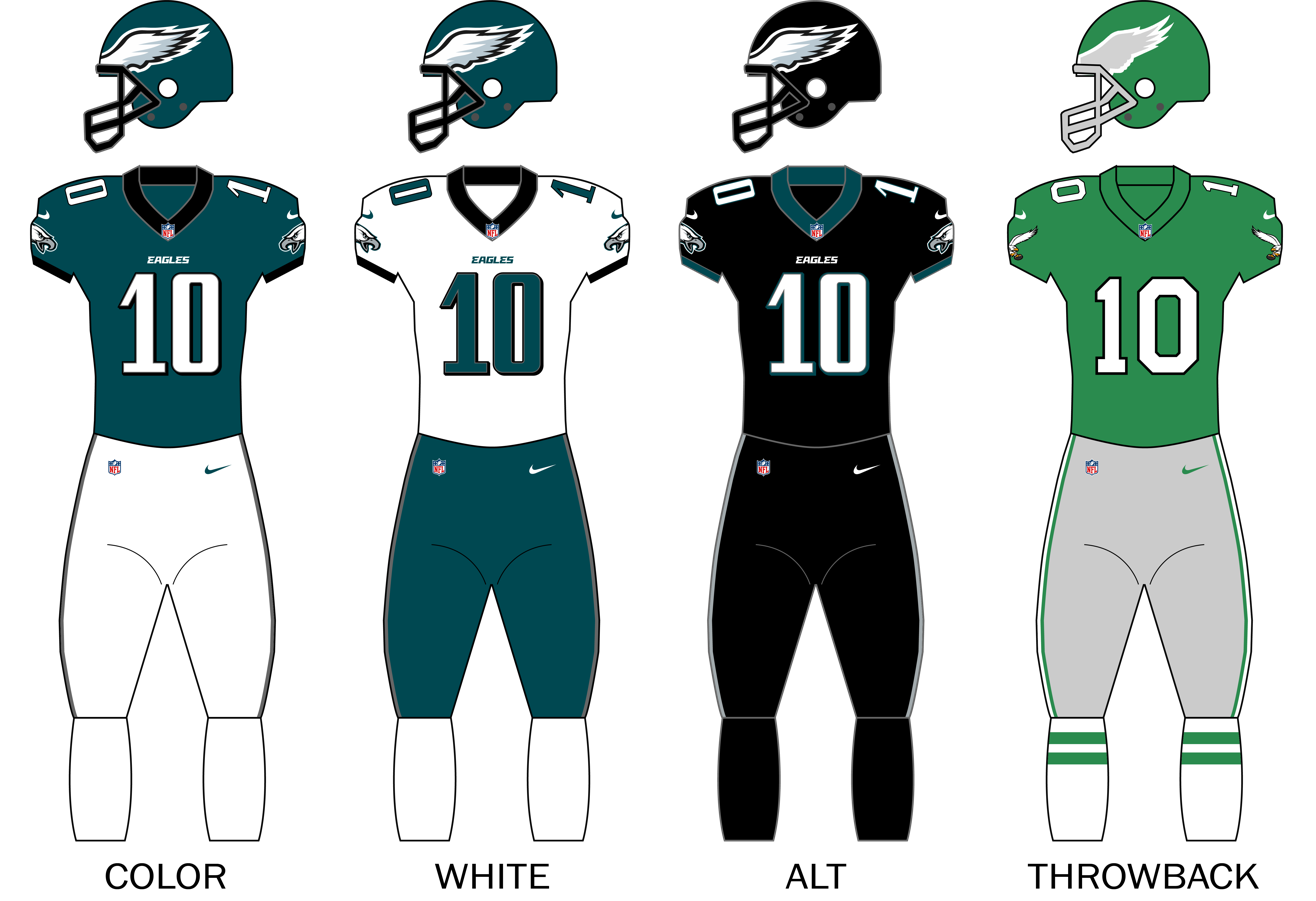

The 2024 season was the Philadelphia Eagles' 92nd in the National Football League (NFL) and their fourth under head coach Nick Sirianni. The Eagles won their fifth league championship and first since 2017, defeating the two-time defending champion Kansas City Chiefs 40–22, in Super Bowl LIX. With this victory, the Eagles became the only franchise in NFL history to win multiple Super Bowls against defending Super Bowl champions, having previously done so seven years earlier. Philadelphia also became the only NFL franchise to avenge a Super Bowl loss against multiple franchises, defeating the Patriots and Chiefs in Super Bowls LII and LIX after losing to them in Super Bowls XXXIX and LVII, respectively.

In the offseason, two longtime Eagles players, center Jason Kelce and defensive tackle Fletcher Cox, announced their retirements. This season was highlighted by the spectacular play of the newly acquired Saquon Barkley, who became the ninth running back in NFL history to reach 2,000 yards. Despite a turnover-plagued 2–2 start which included a stunning home loss to the Atlanta Falcons and a 33–16 drubbing at the Tampa Bay Buccaneers, the Eagles rebounded to win 16 of their final 17 games. With their Week 14 win over the Carolina Panthers, along with losses by the Falcons and Arizona Cardinals that same day, the Eagles clinched a playoff berth for the fourth straight year and seventh time in the last 8 seasons. With a Week 15 win over their instate rival Pittsburgh Steelers, the Eagles also improved on their 11–6 record from the previous season and won ten consecutive games for the first time in franchise history. In Week 17, the Eagles clinched the NFC East and with that win, swept the Dallas Cowboys for the first time since 2011. With their Week 18 win over the New York Giants, the Eagles finished 14–3 for the second time in three seasons.

Under first-year defensive coordinator Vic Fangio, the defense vastly improved from last season by finishing first in total defense, allowing just 278.4 yards per game—the lowest in the league, as well as allowing only 17.8 points per game which was the second fewest overall. They registered 41 sacks, and forced 22 turnovers, as well as ranking second in turnover differential with a +11.

The Eagles defeated the Green Bay Packers 22–10 in the Wild Card Round and the Los Angeles Rams 28–22 in the Divisional Round. In the NFC Championship Game, the Eagles defeated their division rival Washington Commanders 55–23 to advance to Super Bowl LIX. That victory also gave the Eagles an all-time winning record for the first time in franchise history. The Eagles then faced the Chiefs in a rematch of Super Bowl LVII from two years earlier and defeated the two-time defending champions 40–22, preventing Kansas City from winning three straight Super Bowl championships. The Eagles finished with 18 total wins, tying an NFL record for most total wins in a season along with the 1984 San Francisco 49ers, 1985 Chicago Bears, and 2007 New England Patriots. The Eagles also set an NFL record for most points scored in one postseason, at 145.

In December 2024, Philadelphia Eagles owner Jeffrey Lurie sold an 8% minority stake in the team to two family investment groups, based on a valuation of $8.3 billion.

== NFL Top 100 ==
The Eagles had five players ranked in the NFL Top 100 Players of 2024.

Rank	Player	Position	Change
15	Jalen Hurts	QB	▼12
21	A. J. Brown	WR	▲1
41	Lane Johnson	OT	0
86	Saquon Barkley (Note: Barkley was previously on the New York Giants in the 2023 season.)	RB	▼55
90	DeVonta Smith	WR	▲10

The following player was ranked in the NFL Top 100 Players of 2024 based on his performance with the Philadelphia Eagles in 2023 but is no longer on the team following the release of the list.

Rank	Player	Position	Change
87	Haason Reddick	OLB	▼39

== Offseason ==
=== Coaching changes ===
On January 22, 2024, the Eagles fired defensive coordinator Sean Desai after only one year in that role. On January 23, the Eagles relieved offensive coordinator Brian Johnson of his duties. On January 27, Vic Fangio was named the team's new defensive coordinator. On February 5, the team named Kellen Moore their new offensive coordinator. The 2024 season was the second season in a row that the Eagles fielded both new offensive and defensive coordinators.

2024 Philadelphia Eagles coaching staff changes
Position	Previous coach(es)	2024 replacement(s)
Offensive coordinator	Brian Johnson, 2023	Kellen Moore
Quarterbacks coach	Alex Tanney, 2023	Doug Nussmeier
Assistant offensive line coach	Roy Istvan, 2019–2023	T.J. Paganetti
Offensive assistant	None	Kyle Valero
Defensive coordinator	Sean Desai, (Weeks 1–14, 2023); Matt Patricia, (Weeks 15–End of Season, 2023)	Vic Fangio
Senior defensive assistant	Matt Patricia, (Weeks 1–14, 2023)	Clint Hurtt
Defensive line coach	Tracy Rocker, 2021–2023	Clint Hurtt
Inside linebackers coach	D. J. Eliot, 2023	Bobby King
Defensive backs coach	D.K. McDonald, 2023	Christian Parker
Cornerbacks coach	None	Roy Anderson
Safeties coach	None	Joe Kasper
Assistant linebackers coach	Tyler Scudder, 2023	Ronell Williams
Defensive quality control coach	Mike DiAngelo, 2023	Ronell Williams; Tyler Scudder
Head coach quality control	None	Tyler Yelk

=== Roster changes ===
==== Future contracts ====
All players listed below were signed to reserve/future contracts on January 18, unless otherwise noted. Each player was officially added to the active roster on March 13—the first day of the 2024 league year.

Position	Player	Notes
DT	Thomas Booker	
OT	Le'Raven Clark	placed on injured reserve May 3
WR	Shaquan Davis	waived August 7
DT	Noah Elliss	waived April 30
CB	Mekhi Garner	waived August 17
CB	Mario Goodrich	released July 30
WR	Jacob Harris	waived August 27
WR	Griffin Hebert	waived April 30, re-signed July 25, waived August 27
DE	Tarron Jackson	waived August 27
TE	E. J. Jenkins	waived August 27, re-signed to practice squad August 28
LB	Terrell Lewis	waived August 27
S	Tristin McCollum	
CB	Tiawan Mullen	waived April 30
WR	Joseph Ngata	
RB	Lew Nichols III	waived August 27
OG	Jason Poe	waived August 5, re-signed August 21, waived August 27
LB	Brandon Smith	waived August 27, re-signed to practice squad August 28
C	Lecitus Smith	waived April 30
OG	Brett Toth	waived August 27, re-signed to practice squad August 29
WR	Austin Watkins	waived August 27
TE	Noah Togiai	signed January 30, waived May 13
LB	Julian Okwara	signed February 14, waived August 27
RB	Tyrion Davis-Price	signed February 21, waived August 27, re-signed to practice squad August 28
OT	Darian Kinnard	signed February 21

==== Free agents ====
Position	Player	Tag	2024 team	Notes
LB	Shaun Bradley	UFA	Houston Texans	
LB	Zach Cunningham	UFA	Denver Broncos	
OT	Jack Driscoll	UFA	Miami Dolphins	1 year, $1.79 million
S	Justin Evans	UFA		
DE	Brandon Graham	UFA	Philadelphia Eagles	1 year, $4 million
OT	Roderick Johnson	UFA		
WR	Julio Jones	UFA		
LB	Shaquille Leonard	UFA		
LS	Rick Lovato	UFA	Philadelphia Eagles	1 year, $1.26 million
P	Braden Mann	UFA	Philadelphia Eagles	2 years, $4.2 million
QB	Marcus Mariota	UFA	Washington Commanders	1 year, $6 million
LB	Nicholas Morrow	UFA	Buffalo Bills	1 year, $1.5 million
TE	Albert Okwuegbunam	UFA	Philadelphia Eagles	1 year, $1.35 million
OG	Sua Opeta	UFA	Tampa Bay Buccaneers	1 year, $1.375 million
RB	Rashaad Penny	UFA	Carolina Panthers	1 year
CB	Bradley Roby	UFA		
RB	Boston Scott	UFA	Los Angeles Rams	1 year, $1.225 million
TE	Jack Stoll	RFA	New York Giants	1 year, $1.105 million
RB	D'Andre Swift	UFA	Chicago Bears	3 years, $24 million
WR	Quez Watkins	UFA	Pittsburgh Steelers	1 year, $1.293 million
WR	Olamide Zaccheaus	UFA	Washington Commanders	1 year, $1.293 million

==== Signings ====
Position	Player	Tag	2023 team	Date signed	Notes
RB	Saquon Barkley	UFA	New York Giants	March 13	3 years, $37.75 million
ILB	Zack Baun	UFA	New Orleans Saints	March 13	1 year, $3.5 million
C	Matt Hennessy	UFA	Atlanta Falcons	March 13	1 year, $1.75 million
DE	Bryce Huff	UFA	New York Jets	March 13	3 years, $51.1 million
S	C. J. Gardner-Johnson	UFA	Detroit Lions	March 14	3 years, $27 million
WR	DeVante Parker	UFA	New England Patriots	March 14	1 year, $1.21 million
ILB	Devin White	UFA	Tampa Bay Buccaneers	March 18	1 year, $4 million
ILB	Oren Burks	UFA	San Francisco 49ers	March 19	1 year, $2.5 million
NT	P. J. Mustipher	UFA	New Orleans Saints	March 19	1 year
WR	Parris Campbell	UFA	New York Giants	March 21	1 year, $1.292 million
CB	Tyler Hall	UFA	Las Vegas Raiders	March 21	1 year, $1.175 million
QB	Will Grier	UFA	Los Angeles Chargers	March 23	1 year, $1.125 million
CB	Avonte Maddox	UFA	Philadelphia Eagles	April 4	1 year, $2 million
TE	C. J. Uzomah	UFA	New York Jets	April 11	1 year, $1.377 million
OT	Mekhi Becton	UFA	New York Jets	April 29	1 year, $2.75 million
WR	John Ross	UFA	Kansas City Chiefs	May 23	1 year
G	Max Scharping	UFA	Cincinnati Bengals	June 3	1 year
CB	Parry Nickerson	UFA	Miami Dolphins	June 7	1 year
C	Nick Gates	UFA	Washington Commanders	July 30	1 year
LB	Shaquille Quarterman	UFA	Jacksonville Jaguars	August 5	1 year
TE	Armani Rogers	WVR	Washington Commanders	August 7	1 year
S	Caden Sterns	UFA	Carolina Panthers	August 11	1 year
DT	Byron Young	WVR	Las Vegas Raiders	August 29	1 year
DE	Charles Harris	WVR	Carolina Panthers	November 26	1 year
S	Lewis Cine	UFA	Buffalo Bills	January 8	1 year

==== Extensions ====
Position	Player	Date signed	Notes
OG	Landon Dickerson	March 11	4 years, $87 million
K	Jake Elliott	March 13	4 years, $24 million
S	Reed Blankenship	April 1	1 year
OT	Jordan Mailata	April 4	3 years, $66 million
WR	DeVonta Smith	April 15	3 years, $75 million
WR	A. J. Brown	April 25	3 years, $96 million

==== Releases ====
Position	Player	2024 team	Release Date
S	Kevin Byard	Chicago Bears	March 1
CB	Avonte Maddox	Philadelphia Eagles	March 7
LB	Shaquille Quarterman	Los Angeles Chargers	August 11
TE	C. J. Uzomah	Philadelphia Eagles	August 21
DT	Marlon Tuipulotu	Kansas City Chiefs	August 29
LB	Patrick Johnson	New York Giants	September 16
LB	Devin White	Houston Texans	October 8
WR	Parris Campbell	Philadelphia Eagles	October 22
TE	Albert Okwuegbunam	Indianapolis Colts	November 5
TE	Jack Stoll	Miami Dolphins	November 12
WR	Parris Campbell	Philadelphia Eagles	December 2
DE	Charles Harris	Philadelphia Eagles	December 28
QB	Ian Book		January 7

==== Retirements ====
Position	Player	Years with the Eagles	Years in the NFL
C	Jason Kelce	13	
DT	Fletcher Cox	12	
WR	DeVante Parker	0	9

==== Trades ====
Trades below only are for trades that included a player. Draft pick-only trades will go in draft section.

Date	Player(s)/Asset(s) received	Team	Player(s)/Asset(s) traded	Source
March 16	QB Kenny Pickett, 2024 4th round selection (No. 120)	Pittsburgh Steelers	2024 3rd round selection (No. 98), 2025 7th round selection (No. 223), 2025 7th round selection (No. 229)	
April 1	2026 conditional selection	New York Jets	LB Haason Reddick	
August 22	WR Jahan Dotson, 2025 5th round selection (No. 165)	Washington Commanders	2025 3rd round selection (No. 79), 2025 7th round selection (No. 236), 2025 7th round selection (No. 248)	

== Draft ==
2024 Philadelphia Eagles draft selections
Round	Selection	Player	Position	College	Notes
1	22	Quinyon Mitchell	CB	Toledo	
2	40	Cooper DeJean	CB	Iowa	From Bears via Commanders (Note: The Eagles traded two second-round selections and a fifth-round selection (50th, 53rd and 161st overall) to the Washington Commanders in exchange for second-, third- and fifth-round selections (40th, 78th and 152nd overall).)
2	50	Traded to the Washington Commanders			From Saints (Note: The Eagles traded two 2022 first-round selections (16th and 19th overall) and a 2023 sixth-round selection (194th overall) to the New Orleans Saints in exchange for a second-round selection (50th overall), 2022 first-, third- and seventh-round selections (18th, 101st and 237th overall), and a 2023 first-round selection (10th overall).)
2	53	Traded to the Washington Commanders			
3	78	Traded to Houston Texans (Note: The Eagles traded a third-round selection (78th overall) to the Houston Texans in exchange for third- and fourth-round selections (86th and 123rd overall).)			From Seahawks via Commanders
3	86	Traded to San Francisco 49ers (Note: The Eagles traded a third-round selection (86th overall) to the San Francisco 49ers in exchange for third- and fourth-round selections (94th and 132nd overall).)			From Eagles via Texans
3	94	Jalyx Hunt	DE	Houston Christian	From 49ers
3	98	Traded to the Pittsburgh Steelers (Note: The Eagles traded a third-round selection (98th overall) and two 2025 seventh-round selections to the Pittsburgh Steelers in exchange for a fourth-round selection (120th overall) and QB Kenny Pickett.)			Compensatory selection
4	120	Traded to the Miami Dolphins (Note: The Eagles traded a fourth-round selection (120th overall) to the Miami Dolphins in exchange for a 2025 third-round selection.)			From Rams via Steelers
4	122	Traded to the Chicago Bears (Note: The Eagles traded a fourth-round selection (122nd overall) and a 2023 first-round selection (10th overall) to the Chicago Bears in exchange for a 2023 first-round selection (9th overall).)			
4	123	Traded to the Houston Texans (Note: The Eagles traded a fourth-round selection (123rd overall) to the Houston Texans in exchange for a fourth-round selection (127th overall) and a 2025 fifth-round selection.)			From Browns via Texans
4	127	Will Shipley	RB	Clemson	From Texans
4	132	Traded to the Detroit Lions (Note: The Eagles traded fourth- and sixth-round selections (132nd and 210th overall) to the Lions in exchange for fifth- and sixth-round selections (164th and 201st overall), and a 2025 fourth-round selection.)			Compensatory selection; from 49ers
5	146	Traded to the Tennessee Titans (Note: The Eagles traded fifth- and sixth-round selections (146th and 182nd overall), and S Terrell Edmunds to the Tennessee Titans in exchange for S Kevin Byard.)			From Vikings (Note: The Eagles traded WR Jalen Reagor to the Minnesota Vikings in exchange for a fifth-round selection (146th overall) and a 2023 seventh-round selection (219th overall).)
5	152	Ainias Smith	WR	Texas A&M	From Seahawks via Commanders
5	155	Jeremiah Trotter Jr.	LB	Clemson	From Steelers via Colts (Note: The Eagles traded fifth- and sixth-round selections (164th and 201st overall) to the Indianapolis Colts in exchange for a fifth-round selection (155th overall).)
5	156	Traded to the Arizona Cardinals (Note: The Eagles traded a fifth-round selection (156th overall) and a 2023 third-round selection (94th overall) to the Arizona Cardinals in exchange for a third-round selection (66th overall). The trade also settled Philadelphia's tampering complaint against Arizona regarding the Cardinals' hiring of Eagles DC Jonathan Gannon as their head coach.)			
5	161	Traded to the Washington Commanders			From Buccaneers (Note: The Eagles traded a 2023 sixth-round selection (191st overall) to the Tampa Bay Buccaneers in exchange for a fifth-round selection (161st overall).)
5	164	Traded to the Indianapolis Colts			From Lions
5	171	Traded to New York Jets (Note: The Eagles traded a fifth-round selection (171st overall) to the New York Jets in exchange for two sixth-round selections (185th and 190th overall).)			Compensatory selection
5	172	Trevor Keegan	OG	Michigan	Compensatory selection
6	182	Traded to the Tennessee Titans			From Titans
6	185	Johnny Wilson	WR	Florida State	From Jets
6	190	Dylan McMahon	C	NC State	From Saints via Jets
6	199	Traded to the New Orleans Saints (Note: The Eagles traded a sixth-round selection (199th overall) and a 2023 fifth-round selection to the New Orleans Saints in exchange for a 2025 seventh-round selection and S C. J. Gardner-Johnson.)			
6	201	Traded to the Indianapolis Colts			From Buccaneers via Lions
6	210	Traded to the Detroit Lions			Compensatory selection
7	242	Traded to the Tennessee Titans			

Draft notes

=== Undrafted free agents ===
All undrafted free agents were signed on May 10, unless otherwise noted.

2024 Philadelphia Eagles undrafted free agents
Player	Position	College	Notes
Gottlieb Ayedze	OT	Maryland	waived July 25, re-signed August 17, waived August 27
McCallan Castles	TE	Tennessee	waived off injured reserve August 3
Anim Dankwah	OT	Howard	waived August 27
Gabe Hall	DT	Baylor	signed to practice squad August 28
Kendall Milton	RB	Georgia	waived August 27
Andre' Sam	S	LSU	signed to practice squad August 28
Laekin Vakalahi	OT	–	signed as part of the International Player Pathway Program, signed to practice squad August 28
Shon Stephens	CB	Ferris State	signed May 13, waived August 27
Kevin Foelsch	TE	New Haven	claimed off waivers August 3 from NY Jets, released September 18
Marcus Rosemy-Jacksaint	WR	Georgia	signed to practice squad August 28
A. J. Woods	CB	Pittsburgh	signed to practice squad September 10
Dallas Gant	LB	Toledo	signed to practice squad November 4

== Personnel ==
=== Staff / Coaches ===
2024 Philadelphia Eagles staff
Front office: Chairman/CEO – Jeffrey Lurie; President – Don Smolenski; General manager/executive vice president – Howie Roseman; Assistant general manager – Alec Halaby; Assistant general manager – Jon Ferrari; Senior advisor to the general manager/chief security officer – Dom DiSandro; Vice president of football operations – Jeff Scott; Senior vice president/Tertiary football executive – Bryce Johnston; Senior personnel director/advisor to the general manager – Matt Russell; Senior personnel director/advisor to the general manager – Dave Caldwell; Director of player development – Connor Barwin; Senior director of scouting – Brandon Hunt; Vice president of player personnel – Charles Walls; Vice president of player personnel – Alan Wolking; Director of player personnel – Phil Bhaya; Assistant director of player personnel – Jeremy Gray; Senior director of college scouting – Anthony Patch; Assistant director of college scouting – Ryan Myers; Director of football analytics – James Gilman; Assistant director of football analytics – John Liu; Director of football operations/pro scout – Ameena Soliman; Vice president of football operations and strategy – Adam Berry; Head coaches: Head coach – Nick Sirianni; Associate head coach/passing game coordinator – Kevin Patullo; Assistant head coach/running backs – Jemal Singleton; Offensive coaches: Offensive coordinator – Kellen Moore; Quarterbacks – Doug Nussmeier; Wide receivers – Aaron Moorehead; Tight ends – Jason Michael; Run game coordinator/offensive line – Jeff Stoutland; Run game specialist/assistant offensive line – T. J. Paganetti; Offensive quality control – Eric Dickerson; Offensive assistant – Kyle Valero	Defensive coaches: Defensive coordinator – Vic Fangio; Senior defensive assistant/defensive line – Clint Hurtt; Defensive ends/outside linebackers – Jeremiah Washburn; Inside linebackers – Bobby King; Passing game coordinator/defensive backs – Christian Parker; Cornerbacks – Roy Anderson; Safeties – Joe Kasper; Defensive quality control/assistant linebackers – Ronell Williams; Defensive quality control – Tyler Scudder; Special teams coaches: Special teams coordinator – Michael Clay; Assistant special teams coordinator – Joe Pannunzio; Special teams assistant – Tyler Brown; Strength and conditioning: Head athletic trainer – Tom Hunkele; Head strength and conditioning – Fernando Noriega

=== Final roster ===
2024 Philadelphia Eagles roster
Quarterbacks (QB): 1 Jalen Hurts; 16 Tanner McKee; 7 Kenny Pickett; Running backs (RB): 26 Saquon Barkley; 14 Kenneth Gainwell; 28 Will Shipley; Wide receivers (WR): 11 A. J. Brown; 80 Parris Campbell; 83 Jahan Dotson; 82 Ainias Smith; 6 DeVonta Smith; 89 Johnny Wilson; Tight ends (TE): 81 Grant Calcaterra; 88 Dallas Goedert; 84 E. J. Jenkins	Offensive linemen (OL): 77 Mekhi Becton RG; 69 Landon Dickerson LG; 74 Fred Johnson LT; 65 Lane Johnson RT; 51 Cam Jurgens C; 79 Trevor Keegan LG; 72 Darian Kinnard RT; 68 Jordan Mailata LT; 56 Tyler Steen RG; 64 Brett Toth G; Defensive linemen (DL): 59 Thomas Booker DT; 98 Jalen Carter DT; 90 Jordan Davis DT; 55 Brandon Graham DE; 0 Bryce Huff DE; 97 Moro Ojomo DT; 93 Milton Williams DT	Linebackers (LB): 53 Zack Baun ILB; 42 Oren Burks ILB; 58 Jalyx Hunt OLB; 3 Nolan Smith OLB; 19 Josh Sweat OLB; 54 Jeremiah Trotter Jr. ILB; Defensive backs (DB): 32 Reed Blankenship FS; 21 Sydney Brown SS; 38 Lewis Cine FS; 33 Cooper DeJean CB; 8 C. J. Gardner-Johnson SS; 29 Avonte Maddox CB; 36 Tristin McCollum FS; 27 Quinyon Mitchell CB; 23 Eli Ricks CB; 22 Kelee Ringo CB; 34 Isaiah Rodgers CB; 2 Darius Slay CB; Special teams (ST): 4 Jake Elliott K; 49 Rick Lovato LS; 10 Braden Mann P	Practice squad: 48 Khari Blasingame FB; 13 Ian Book QB; 46 Tariq Castro-Fields CB; 35 Ty Davis-Price RB; 52 Dallas Gant ILB; 41 Danny Gray WR; 96 Gabe Hall DT; 95 Charles Harris DE; 50 KJ Henry DE; 45 Ochaun Mathis OLB; 43 Nicholas Morrow ILB; 87 Nick Muse TE; 30 Parry Nickerson CB; 86 Kyle Philips WR; 31 Andre' Sam FS; 67 Laekin Vakalahi LT (IPP); 39 A. J. Woods CB; Reserve: 24 James Bradberry CB (IR); 73 Le'Raven Clark RT (IR); 18 Britain Covey WR (IR/DFR); 17 Nakobe Dean ILB (IR); 75 Jack Driscoll RT (IR); 61 Nick Gates C (IR); 47 C. J. Uzomah TE (IR/DFR); 57 Ben VanSumeren ILB (IR); 94 Byron Young DT (IR); Rookies in italics 53 active, 17 reserve, 9 practice squad

== Preseason ==
The Eagles' preseason opponents and preliminary schedule were announced on May 15, in conjunction with the release of the regular season schedule.

Week	Date	Opponent	Result	Record	Venue	Recap
1	August 9	at Baltimore Ravens	W 16–13	1–0	M&T Bank Stadium	Recap
2	August 15	at New England Patriots	W 14–13	2–0	Gillette Stadium	Recap
3	August 24	Minnesota Vikings	L 3–26	2–1	Lincoln Financial Field	Recap

== Regular season ==
=== Schedule ===
Week	Date	Opponent	Result	Record	Venue	Recap
1	September 6	Green Bay Packers	**W** 34–29	1–0	(Brazil) Arena Corinthians (São Paulo)	Recap
2	September 16	Atlanta Falcons	**L** 21–22	1–1	Lincoln Financial Field	Recap
3	September 22	at New Orleans Saints	**W** 15–12	2–1	Caesars Superdome	Recap
4	September 29	at Tampa Bay Buccaneers	**L** 16–33	2–2	Raymond James Stadium	Recap
5	Bye					
6	October 13	Cleveland Browns	**W** 20–16	3–2	Lincoln Financial Field	Recap
7	October 20	at **New York Giants**	**W** 28–3	4–2	MetLife Stadium	Recap
8	October 27	at Cincinnati Bengals	**W** 37–17	5–2	Paycor Stadium	Recap
9	November 3	Jacksonville Jaguars	**W** 28–23	6–2	Lincoln Financial Field	Recap
10	November 10	at **Dallas Cowboys**	**W** 34–6	7–2	AT&T Stadium	Recap
11	November 14	**Washington Commanders**	**W** 26–18	8–2	Lincoln Financial Field	Recap
12	November 24	at Los Angeles Rams	**W** 37–20	9–2	SoFi Stadium	Recap
13	December 1	at Baltimore Ravens	**W** 24–19	10–2	M&T Bank Stadium	Recap
14	December 8	Carolina Panthers	**W** 22–16	11–2	Lincoln Financial Field	Recap
15	December 15	Pittsburgh Steelers	**W** 27–13	12–2	Lincoln Financial Field	Recap
16	December 22	at **Washington Commanders**	**L** 33–36	12–3	Northwest Stadium	Recap
17	December 29	**Dallas Cowboys**	**W** 41–7	13–3	Lincoln Financial Field	Recap
18	January 5	**New York Giants**	**W** 20–13	14–3	Lincoln Financial Field	Recap

Note: Intra-division opponents are in bold text.

=== Game summaries ===
==== Week 1: vs. Green Bay Packers ====
NFL Brazil games

Week 1: Green Bay Packers at Philadelphia Eagles – Game summary

Quarter	1	2	3	4	Total
Packers	6	13	7	3	**29**
**Eagles**	0	17	14	3	**34**

at Arena Corinthians, São Paulo, Brazil

- Date: September 6
- Game time: 9:15 p.m. BRT/8:15 p.m. EDT
- Game weather: 63 °F (17 °C)
- Game attendance: 47,236
- Referee: Ronald Torbert
- TV announcers (NBC): Noah Eagle, Todd Blackledge and Kaylee Hartung
  Exclusive to WCAU, WGBA, and WTMJ. Game was available out of market on Peacock.
- Recap, Game Book

Game information

**First quarter**

- GB – Brayden Narveson 31-yard field goal, 8:26. Packers 3–0. **Drive: 5 plays, 6 yards, 2:20.**
- GB – Brayden Narveson 26-yard field goal, 3:01. Packers 6–0. **Drive: 8 plays, 8 yards, 4:05.**

**Second quarter**

- PHI – Saquon Barkley 18-yard pass from Jalen Hurts (Jake Elliott kick), 12:38. Eagles 7–6. **Drive: 11 plays, 70 yards, 5:23.**
- GB – Jayden Reed 33-yard run (run failed), 10:16. Packers 12–7. **Drive: 5 plays, 70 yards, 2:22.**
- PHI – Saquon Barkley 11-yard run (Jake Elliott kick), 5:34. Eagles 14–12. **Drive: 9 plays, 70 yards, 4:42.**
- GB – Jayden Reed 70-yard pass from Jordan Love (Brayden Narveson kick), 5:11. Packers 19–14. **Drive: 3 plays, 70 yards, 0:23.**
- PHI – Jake Elliott 38-yard field goal, 0:00. Packers 19–17. **Drive: 15 plays, 57 yards, 5:11.**

**Third quarter**

- PHI – A. J. Brown 67-yard pass from Jalen Hurts (Jake Elliot kick), 14:09. Eagles 24–19. **Drive: 2 plays, 70 yards, 0:51.**
- GB – Christian Watson 2-yard pass from Jordan Love (Brayden Narveson kick), 11:55. Packers 26–24. **Drive: 6 plays, 70 yards, 2:14.**
- PHI – Saquon Barkley 2-yard run (Jake Elliott kick), 4:26. Eagles 31–26. **Drive: 4 plays, 24 yards, 1:42.**

**Fourth quarter**

- GB – Brayden Narveson 26-yard field goal, 7:52. Eagles 31–29. **Drive: 10 plays, 79 yards, 5:01.**
- PHI – Jake Elliott 21-yard field goal, 0:27. Eagles 34–29. **Drive: 16 plays, 67 yards, 7:25.**

**Top passers**

- GB – Jordan Love – 17/34, 260 yards, 2 TD, INT
- PHI – Jalen Hurts – 20/34, 278 yards, 2 TD, 2 INT

**Top rushers**

- GB – Josh Jacobs – 16 rushes, 84 yards
- PHI – Saquon Barkley – 24 rushes, 109 yards, 2 TD

**Top receivers**

- GB – Jayden Reed – 4 receptions, 138 yards, TD
- PHI – A. J. Brown – 5 receptions, 119 yards, TD

In the first quarter, the Eagles turned the ball over twice in Packers territory, however, the defense was able to hold them to field goals both times, thus the Eagles only trailed 6–0 after the first quarter. In the second quarter, both teams exchanged touchdowns twice to make the score 19–14 in favor of the Packers, before the Eagles drove down the field. Despite taking up the final five minutes from the half, the Eagles were held to a field goal, resulting in the score being 19–17 at halftime. After the two sides exchanged touchdowns in the third quarter, the Eagles were able to take a 31–26 lead after Jordan Love got picked off deep in Eagles territory. Following a miss by Brayden Narveson from 43 yards out, the Eagles drove all the way to the Packers 14 yard line before Jalen Hurts got intercepted in the end zone. However, the Packers were held to a field goal on their next drive, and on their next possession, the Eagles drained the clock to just 27 seconds before kicking a field goal to take a 34–29 lead. Despite the Packers reaching midfield, Zack Baun got a sack on Malik Willis after Love exited the game due to an injury, clinching the win.

==== Week 2: vs. Atlanta Falcons ====
Week 2: Atlanta Falcons at Philadelphia Eagles – Game summary

Quarter	1	2	3	4	Total
**Falcons**	0	6	9	7	**22**
Eagles	0	7	3	11	**21**

at Lincoln Financial Field, Philadelphia, Pennsylvania

- Date: September 16
- Game time: 8:15 p.m. EDT
- Game weather: Cloudy, 71 °F (22 °C)
- Game attendance: 69,879
- Referee: Craig Wrolstad
- TV announcers (WPVI, WUPA, ESPN): Joe Buck, Troy Aikman and Lisa Salters
  WSB-TV declined the option as the Falcons' local broadcast. WUPA won the bid from the NFL for Atlanta market rights.
- Recap, Game Book

Game information

**First quarter**

- No scoring plays.

**Second quarter**

- ATL – Younghoe Koo 39-yard field goal, 11:22. Falcons 3–0. **Drive: 8 plays, 52 yards, 3:55.**
- PHI – DeVonta Smith 7-yard pass from Jalen Hurts (Jake Elliott kick), 5:15. Eagles 7–3. **Drive: 11 plays, 70 yards, 6:07.**
- ATL – Younghoe Koo 22-yard field goal, 0:06. Eagles 7–6. **Drive: 15 plays, 82 yards, 5:09.**

**Third quarter**

- ATL – Younghoe Koo 34-yard field goal, 10:12. Falcons 9–7. **Drive: 9 plays, 54 yards, 4:48.**
- PHI – Jake Elliott 29-yard field goal, 4:28. Eagles 10–9. **Drive: 11 plays, 59 yards, 5:44.**
- ATL – Darnell Mooney 41-yard pass from Kirk Cousins (pass failed), 1:21. Falcons 15–10. **Drive: 7 plays, 70 yards, 3:07.**

**Fourth quarter**

- PHI – Jalen Hurts 1-yard run (Saquon Barkley run), 6:47. Eagles 18–15. **Drive: 17 plays, 70 yards, 9:34.**
- PHI – Jake Elliott 28-yard field goal, 1:39. Eagles 21–15. **Drive: 11 plays, 29 yards, 3:59.**
- ATL – Drake London 7-yard pass from Kirk Cousins (Younghoe Koo kick), 0:34. Falcons 22–21. **Drive: 6 plays, 70 yards, 1:05.**

**Top passers**

- ATL – Kirk Cousins – 20/29, 241 yards, 2 TD
- PHI – Jalen Hurts – 23/30, 183 yards, TD, INT

**Top rushers**

- ATL – Bijan Robinson – 14 rushes, 97 yards
- PHI – Saquon Barkley – 22 rushes, 95 yards

**Top receivers**

- ATL – Darnell Mooney – 3 receptions, 88 yards, TD
- PHI – DeVonta Smith – 7 receptions, 76 yards, TD

Despite having the ball deep in Atlanta territory up 18–15, giving the team a 99% chance of victory, the Eagles could not hold on and suffered their first home loss to the Falcons since the 2012 season. A dropped pass by Saquon Barkley stopped the clock, giving Atlanta time on the final drive to take the lead with 34 seconds remaining in regulation. Jessie Bates III then picked off Jalen Hurts on the Eagles' final drive, securing the 22–21 upset victory for Atlanta and dropping Philadelphia to 1–1 on the year.

==== Week 3: at New Orleans Saints ====
Week 3: Philadelphia Eagles at New Orleans Saints – Game summary

Quarter	1	2	3	4	Total
**Eagles**	0	0	0	15	**15**
Saints	3	0	0	9	**12**

at Caesars Superdome, New Orleans, Louisiana

- Date: September 22
- Game time: 1:00 p.m. EDT/12:00 p.m. CDT
- Game weather: None (indoor stadium)
- Game attendance: 70,006
- Referee: Scott Novak
- TV announcers (Fox): Joe Davis, Greg Olsen and Pam Oliver
- Recap, Game Book

Game information

**First quarter**

- NO – Blake Grupe 34-yard field goal, 6:51. Saints 3–0. **Drive: 15 plays, 54 yards, 8:09.**

**Second quarter**

- No scoring plays.

**Third quarter**

- No scoring plays.

**Fourth quarter**

- PHI – Saquon Barkley 65-yard run (Jake Elliott kick), 13:17. Eagles 7–3. **Drive: 4 plays, 82 yards, 1:41.**
- NO – Blake Grupe 38-yard field goal, 9:49. Eagles 7–6. **Drive: 8 plays, 50 yards, 3:28.**
- NO – Chris Olave 13-yard pass from Derek Carr (pass failed), 2:03. Saints 12–7. **Drive: 9 plays, 50 yards, 4:38.**
- PHI – Saquon Barkley 4-yard run (Saquon Barkley run), 1:01. Eagles 15–12. **Drive: 5 plays, 69 yards, 1:02.**

**Top passers**

- PHI – Jalen Hurts – 29/38, 311 yards, INT
- NO – Derek Carr – 14/25, 142 yards, TD, INT

**Top rushers**

- PHI – Saquon Barkley – 17 rushes, 147 yards, 2 TD
- NO – Alvin Kamara – 26 rushes, 87 yards

**Top receivers**

- PHI – Dallas Goedert – 10 receptions, 170 yards
- NO – Chris Olave – 6 receptions, 86 yards, TD

The Eagles fell behind 3–0 after three quarters following two turnovers from quarterback Jalen Hurts and two failed fourth-down conversions in New Orleans territory. However, at the beginning of the final quarter, Saquon Barkley rushed for a 65-yard touchdown after the Saints had a turnover on downs deep in Eagles territory following a blocked punt. Following a field goal by the Saints, Eagles kicker Jake Elliott missed a 60-yard field goal, and the Saints scored a touchdown to take a 12–7 lead with just over two minutes left. However, a short pass from Hurts to Dallas Goedert for 61 yards on 3rd-and-16 set up another touchdown plus a two-point conversion by Barkley to make it a 15–12 Eagles lead. Reed Blankenship picked off Derek Carr on the final drive to seal the win. The Eagles won in New Orleans for the first time since 2007.

==== Week 4: at Tampa Bay Buccaneers ====
Week 4: Philadelphia Eagles at Tampa Bay Buccaneers – Game summary

Quarter	1	2	3	4	Total
Eagles	0	7	9	0	**16**
**Buccaneers**	14	10	6	3	**33**

at Raymond James Stadium, Tampa, Florida

- Date: September 29
- Game time: 1:00 p.m. EDT
- Game weather: Cloudy, 88 °F (31 °C)
- Game attendance: 64,233
- Referee: Carl Cheffers
- TV announcers (Fox): Kevin Burkhardt, Tom Brady, Erin Andrews and Tom Rinaldi
- Recap, Game Book

Game information

**First quarter**

- TB – Mike Evans 2-yard pass from Baker Mayfield (Chase McLaughlin kick), 9:44. Buccaneers 7–0. **Drive: 10 plays, 79 yards, 5:16.**
- TB – Trey Palmer 15-yard pass from Baker Mayfield (Chase McLaughlin kick), 5:03. Buccaneers 14–0. **Drive: 5 plays, 80 yards, 2:46.**

**Second quarter**

- TB – Baker Mayfield 1-yard run (Chase McLaughlin kick), 14:09. Buccaneers 21–0. **Drive: 5 plays, 22 yards, 1:57.**
- TB – Chase McLaughlin 21-yard field goal, 7:18. Buccaneers 24–0. **Drive: 12 plays, 77 yards, 6:29.**
- PHI – Parris Campbell 1-yard pass from Jalen Hurts (Jake Elliott kick), 1:54. Buccaneers 24–7. **Drive: 14 plays, 70 yards, 5:24.**

**Third quarter**

- PHI – Jalen Hurts 1-yard run (Jake Elliott kick), 12:28. Buccaneers 24–14. **Drive: 5 plays, 70 yards, 2:32.**
- TB – Bucky Irving 1-yard run (kick blocked), 6:49. Buccaneers 30–14. **Drive: 12 plays, 70 yards, 5:39.**
- PHI – Kelee Ringo defensive two-point conversion, 6:49. Buccaneers 30–16.

**Fourth quarter**

- TB – Chase McLaughlin 52-yard field goal, 12:59. Buccaneers 33–16. **Drive: 9 plays, 42 yards, 4:37.**

**Top passers**

- PHI – Jalen Hurts – 18/30, 158 yards, TD
- TB – Baker Mayfield – 30/47, 347 yards, 2 TD

**Top rushers**

- PHI – Saquon Barkley – 10 rushes, 84 yards
- TB – Bucky Irving – 10 rushes, 49 yards, TD

**Top receivers**

- PHI – Dallas Goedert – 7 receptions, 62 yards
- TB – Mike Evans – 8 receptions, 94 yards, TD

The Eagles visited the Tampa Bay Buccaneers without star receivers A. J. Brown and DeVonta Smith as well as tackle Lane Johnson, due to concussions suffered by Smith and Johnson and an ailing hamstring for Brown respectively. The Buccaneers raced to a 24–0 lead in the first half, and never looked back. While the Eagles were able to cut Tampa Bay's lead to 24–14 in the third quarter thanks to a better defensive effort, the Buccaneers would pull away, limiting Philadelphia to only a defensive two-point conversion the rest of the way. The Eagles dropped to 2–2 with the 33–16 road loss. It was the fourth time in the last five meetings Tampa Bay had beaten Philadelphia, including playoff matchups in the 2021 and 2023 seasons.

==== Week 6: vs. Cleveland Browns ====
Week 6: Cleveland Browns at Philadelphia Eagles – Game summary

Quarter	1	2	3	4	Total
Browns	0	10	0	6	**16**
**Eagles**	0	10	3	7	**20**

at Lincoln Financial Field, Philadelphia, Pennsylvania

- Date: October 13
- Game time: 1:00 p.m. EDT
- Game weather: Clear, 75 °F (24 °C)
- Game attendance: 69,879
- Referee: Shawn Hochuli
- TV announcers (Fox): Kenny Albert, Jonathan Vilma and Megan Olivi
- Recap, Game Book

Game information

**First quarter**

- No scoring plays.

**Second quarter**

- PHI – Jake Elliott 49-yard field goal, 13:02. Eagles 3–0. **Drive: 14 plays, 58 yards, 6:48.**
- PHI – A. J. Brown 22-yard pass from Jalen Hurts (Jake Elliott kick), Eagles 10–0. **Drive: 10 plays, 84 yards, 4:46.**
- CLE – Dustin Hopkins 43-yard field goal, 1:58. Eagles 10–3. **Drive: 10 plays, 45 yards, 5:19.**
- CLE – Rodney McLeod 50-yard return of blocked field goal (Dustin Hopkins kick), 0:14. Tied 10–10. **Drive: 6 plays, 33 yards, 1:44.**

**Third quarter**

- PHI – Jake Elliott 44-yard field goal, 2:50. Eagles 13–10. **Drive: 7 plays, 27 yards, 3:57.**

**Fourth quarter**

- CLE – Dustin Hopkins 49-yard field goal, 9:49. Tied 13–13. **Drive: 12 plays, 39 yards, 8:01.**
- PHI – DeVonta Smith 45-yard pass from Jalen Hurts (Jake Elliott kick), 7:54. Eagles 20–13. **Drive: 4 plays, 70 yards, 1:55.**
- CLE – Dustin Hopkins 31-yard field goal, 3:54. Eagles 20–16. **Drive: 9 plays, 57 yards, 4:00.**

**Top passers**

- CLE – Deshaun Watson – 16/23, 168 yards
- PHI – Jalen Hurts – 16/25, 264 yards, 2 TD

**Top rushers**

- CLE – Pierre Strong Jr. – 8 rushes, 43 yards
- PHI – Saquon Barkley – 18 rushes, 47 yards

**Top receivers**

- CLE – Amari Cooper – 4 receptions, 42 yards
- PHI – A. J. Brown – 6 receptions, 116 yards, TD

The Eagles jumped out to a 10–0 lead following a 49-yard field goal by Elliott and a 22-yard touchdown reception by A. J. Brown. However, the Browns cut the lead to 10–3 following a field goal by Dustin Hopkins, and a 57-yard field goal attempt by Elliott was blocked and returned by former Eagles safety Rodney McLeod for a touchdown to tie the game at halftime. The two teams would proceed to exchange field goals before Hurts hit DeVonta Smith for a 45-yard touchdown. The Eagles held the Browns to a 31-yard field goal to maintain a 20–16 lead, and Hurts hit Brown for a 40-yard gain to seal the game.

The game marked rookie Cooper DeJean's first start of the season, playing the nickelback position. It was the first of ten straight victories after starting 2–2.

==== Week 7: at New York Giants ====
Week 7: Philadelphia Eagles at New York Giants – Game summary

Quarter	1	2	3	4	Total
**Eagles**	0	14	7	7	**28**
Giants	0	3	0	0	**3**

at MetLife Stadium, East Rutherford, New Jersey

- Date: October 20
- Game time: 1:00 p.m. EDT
- Game weather: Fog, 72 °F (22 °C)
- Game attendance: 82,779
- Referee: Tra Blake
- TV announcers (Fox): Chris Myers, Mark Sanchez and Kristina Pink
- Recap, Game Book

Game information

**First quarter**

- No scoring plays.

**Second quarter**

- PHI – Saquon Barkley 3-yard run (Jake Elliott kick), 8:58. Eagles 7–0. **Drive: 5 plays, 74 yards, 2:34.**
- PHI – A. J. Brown 41-yard pass from Jalen Hurts (Jake Elliott kick), 4:27. Eagles 14–0. **Drive: 6 plays, 58 yards, 2:23.**
- NYG – Greg Joseph 38-yard field goal, 0:05. Eagles 14–3. **Drive: 10 plays, 39 yards, 1:36.**

**Third quarter**

- PHI – Jalen Hurts 1-yard run (Jake Elliott kick), 7:03. Eagles 21–3. **Drive: 10 plays, 77 yards, 4:47.**

**Fourth quarter**

- PHI – Jalen Hurts 1-yard run (Jake Elliott kick), 11:26. Eagles 28–3. **Drive: 10 plays, 92 yards, 6:07.**

**Top passers**

- PHI – Jalen Hurts – 10/14, 114 yards, TD
- NYG – Daniel Jones – 14/21, 99 yards

**Top rushers**

- PHI – Saquon Barkley – 17 rushes, 176 yards, TD
- NYG – Tyrone Tracy Jr. – 6 rushes, 23 yards

**Top receivers**

- PHI – A. J. Brown – 5 receptions, 89 yards, TD
- NYG – Malik Nabers – 4 receptions, 41 yards

Thanks to a 176 rushing yard performance from Saquon Barkley and 8 sacks from the defense, the Eagles defeated their division rival Giants by a final score of 28–3. While they did not score in the first quarter, Saquon Barkley scored a rushing touchdown early in the second quarter. Later in the same quarter, Jalen Hurts connected with A. J. Brown on a 41-yard touchdown pass on a 4th-and-3. The Eagles continued scoring in the second half, converting two quarterback sneaks for touchdowns in the third and fourth quarters. Early in the fourth quarter, both teams benched their starting quarterbacks, and the Eagles rested all of their offensive starters for the remainder of the game. The only points surrendered by Philadelphia came on a field goal just before the end of the first half. This game marked the first multi-score win for the Eagles since Week 7 of 2023, as well as their first game since their 2021 season opener against the Atlanta Falcons in which they did not surrender a touchdown.

==== Week 8: at Cincinnati Bengals ====
Week 8: Philadelphia Eagles at Cincinnati Bengals – Game summary

Quarter	1	2	3	4	Total
**Eagles**	0	10	14	13	**37**
Bengals	7	3	7	0	**17**

at Paycor Stadium, Cincinnati, Ohio

- Date: October 27
- Game time: 1:00 p.m. EDT
- Game weather: Sunny, 59 °F (15 °C)
- Game attendance: 67,239
- Referee: Scott Novak (Note: John Hussey was originally assigned as the referee for this game. However, due to an unknown injury, Hussey was replaced by Scott Novak.)
- TV announcers (CBS): Ian Eagle, Charles Davis and Evan Washburn
- Recap, Game Book

Game information

**First quarter**

- CIN – Ja'Marr Chase 2-yard pass from Joe Burrow (Evan McPherson kick), 4:56. Bengals 7–0. **Drive: 17 plays, 70 yards, 10:04.**

**Second quarter**

- PHI – Jake Elliott 39-yard field goal, 14:10. Bengals 7–3. **Drive: 10 plays, 52 yards, 5:46.**
- CIN – Evan McPherson 27-yard field goal, 9:32. Bengals 10–3. **Drive: 11 plays, 61 yards, 4:38.**
- PHI – Jalen Hurts 1-yard run (Jake Elliott kick), 0:22. Tied 10–10. **Drive: 12 plays, 56 yards, 4:46.**

**Third quarter**

- PHI – Jalen Hurts 7-yard run (Jake Elliott kick), 10:35. Eagles 17–10. **Drive: 8 plays, 70 yards, 4:25.**
- CIN – Chase Brown 4-yard run (Evan McPherson kick), 4:16. Tied 17–17. **Drive: 13 plays, 70 yards, 6:19.**
- PHI – DeVonta Smith 45-yard pass from Jalen Hurts (Jake Elliott kick), 2:43. Eagles 24–17. **Drive: 3 plays, 70 yards, 1:33.**

**Fourth quarter**

- PHI – Jake Elliott 49-yard field goal, 13:34. Eagles 27–17. **Drive: 4 plays, 6 yards, 2:07.**
- PHI – Jalen Hurts 1-yard run (Jake Elliott kick), 4:39. Eagles 34–17. **Drive: 12 plays, 85 yards, 7:37.**
- PHI – Jake Elliott 47-yard field goal, 1:55. Eagles 37–17. **Drive: 6 plays, 3 yards, 2:36.**

**Top passers**

- PHI – Jalen Hurts – 16/20, 236 yards, TD
- CIN – Joe Burrow – 26/37, 234 yards, TD, INT

**Top rushers**

- PHI – Saquon Barkley – 22 rushes, 108 yards
- CIN – Chase Brown – 12 rushes, 32 yards, TD

**Top receivers**

- PHI – DeVonta Smith – 6 receptions, 85 yards, TD
- CIN – Mike Gesicki – 7 receptions, 73 yards

Despite falling behind 10–3 early, the Eagles tied up the game by halftime, and eventually gained the lead by the end of the 3rd quarter. With the assistance of two turnovers in the fourth, the Eagles handily won 37–17 against the Bengals. This was the Eagles' first victory over the Bengals since 2000, and their first-ever road victory in this matchup after going winless in five previous visits to Cincinnati.

The game traded time slots with the Chicago Bears-Washington Commanders matchup. As such, this was no longer the marquee Sunday matchup of the day.

==== Week 9: vs. Jacksonville Jaguars ====
Week 9: Jacksonville Jaguars at Philadelphia Eagles – Game summary

Quarter	1	2	3	4	Total
Jaguars	0	0	16	7	**23**
**Eagles**	7	9	6	6	**28**

at Lincoln Financial Field, Philadelphia, Pennsylvania

- Date: November 3
- Game time: 4:05 p.m. EST
- Game weather: Clear, 57 °F (14 °C)
- Game attendance: 69,879
- Referee: Alan Eck
- TV announcers (CBS): Andrew Catalon, Tiki Barber, Jason McCourty and A. J. Ross
- Recap, Game Book

Game information

**First quarter**

- PHI – Saquon Barkley 20-yard pass from Jalen Hurts (Jake Elliott kick), 10:22. Eagles 7–0. **Drive: 2 plays, 20 yards, 0:48.**

**Second quarter**

- PHI – Jake Elliott 43-yard field goal, 9:20. Eagles 10–0. **Drive: 15 plays, 68 yards, 8:53.**
- PHI – Saquon Barkley 19-yard run (run failed), 0:22. Eagles 16–0. **Drive: 7 plays, 42 yards, 1:16.**

**Third quarter**

- PHI – Jalen Hurts 18-yard run (run failed), 9:25. Eagles 22–0. **Drive: 7 plays, 78 yards, 3:56.**
- JAX – Trevor Lawrence 1-yard run (Trevor Lawrence–Brian Thomas Jr. pass), 5:26. Eagles 22–8. **Drive: 10 plays, 61 yards, 3:59.**
- JAX – Travon Walker 35-yard fumble return (Trevor Lawrence–Evan Engram pass), 5:12. Eagles 22–16.

**Fourth quarter**

- PHI – DeVonta Smith 25-yard pass from Jalen Hurts (pass failed), 7:43. Eagles 28–16. **Drive: 8 plays, 91 yards, 5:08.**
- JAX – Trevor Lawrence 4-yard run (Cam Little kick), 4:04. Eagles 28–23. **Drive: 9 plays, 70 yards, 3:39.**

**Top passers**

- JAX – Trevor Lawrence – 16/31, 169 yards, 2 INT
- PHI – Jalen Hurts – 18/24, 230 yards, 2 TD

**Top rushers**

- JAX – Travis Etienne – 3 rushes, 24 yards
- PHI – Saquon Barkley – 27 rushes, 169 yards, TD

**Top receivers**

- JAX – Evan Engram – 5 receptions, 45 yards
- PHI – DeVonta Smith – 4 receptions, 87 yards, TD

The Eagles took a 22–0 lead over the Jaguars early in the third quarter. However, the Jaguars would quickly rebound with a Trevor Lawrence touchdown run and two-point conversion, cutting the Eagles' lead to 22–8. Fourteen seconds later, the Jaguars forced a Saquon Barkley fumble, which was returned for a touchdown by Travon Walker. Despite replays appearing to show Barkley down by contact, the ruling was upheld, and Jacksonville trimmed its deficit to 22–16 after the ensuing two-point conversion. The Eagles would rebuild the lead to 12 points with a 25-yard DeVonta Smith touchdown, but Lawrence would record another touchdown run to make it 28–23. The Eagles missed a 57-yard field goal on the ensuing possession, giving the Jaguars the ball near midfield with a chance to mount a game-winning drive. However, after Lawrence advanced to the Eagles 13-yard line, he threw his second interception of the afternoon to Nakobe Dean with 1:38 remaining in regulation, sealing the Eagles' fourth straight win. Philadelphia improved to 6–2 on the year. Despite coming away with the victory, Eagles head coach Nick Sirianni's decision-making was criticized due to two turnovers on downs in Jaguars territory and three failed two-point conversions.

==== Week 10: at Dallas Cowboys ====
Week 10: Philadelphia Eagles at Dallas Cowboys – Game summary

Quarter	1	2	3	4	Total
**Eagles**	7	7	14	6	**34**
Cowboys	3	3	0	0	**6**

at AT&T Stadium, Arlington, Texas

- Date: November 10
- Game time: 4:25 p.m. EST/3:25 p.m. CST
- Game weather: None (retractable roof closed)
- Game attendance: 93,644
- Referee: Alex Kemp
- TV announcers (CBS): Jim Nantz, Tony Romo and Tracy Wolfson
- Recap, Game Book

Game information

**First quarter**

- PHI – Jalen Hurts 1-yard run (Jake Elliott kick), 7:05. Eagles 7–0. **Drive: 4 plays, 17 yards, 1:47.**
- DAL – Brandon Aubrey 46-yard field goal, 3:10. Eagles 7–3. **Drive: 9 plays, 32 yards, 3:55.**

**Second quarter**

- DAL – Brandon Aubrey 23-yard field goal, 1:48. Eagles 7–6. **Drive: 4 plays, 1 yard, 0:20.**
- PHI – Dallas Goedert 14-yard pass from Jalen Hurts (Jake Elliott kick), 0:23. Eagles 14–6. **Drive: 7 plays, 84 yards, 1:25.**

**Third quarter**

- PHI – Johnny Wilson 5-yard pass from Jalen Hurts (Jake Elliott kick), 8:52. Eagles 21–6. **Drive: 7 plays, 37 yards, 2:50.**
- PHI – Jalen Hurts 8-yard run (Jake Elliott kick), 2:56. Eagles 28–6. **Drive: 7 plays, 83 yards, 4:17.**

**Fourth quarter**

- PHI – Jake Elliott 39-yard field goal, 14:50. Eagles 31–6. **Drive: 4 plays, 0 yards, 1:13.**
- PHI – Jake Elliott 38-yard field goal, 10:32. Eagles 34–6. **Drive: 4 plays, 9 yards, 2:10.**

**Top passers**

- PHI – Jalen Hurts – 14/20, 202 yards, 2 TD, INT
- DAL – Cooper Rush – 13/23, 45 yards

**Top rushers**

- PHI – Saquon Barkley – 14 rushes, 66 yards
- DAL – Rico Dowdle – 12 rushes, 53 yards

**Top receivers**

- PHI – A. J. Brown – 5 receptions, 109 yards
- DAL – Jake Ferguson – 4 receptions, 24 yards

The Eagles had a rocky first half. After Dallas fumbled the ball, the Eagles were set up with a short field and scored a touchdown on a quarterback sneak by Jalen Hurts to take a 7–0 lead. The Cowboys answered with a Brandon Aubrey field goal to trim the Eagles' lead to 7–3. Jalen Hurts threw an interception into the end zone on the next possession. However, the Cowboys fumbled in the red zone, although the Eagles immediately fumbled as well, giving Dallas the ball at the Philadelphia 6-yard line. The Eagles defense forced a three-and-out, limiting the Cowboys to another Aubrey field goal, before ending the half with a Dallas Goedert touchdown reception to take a 14–6 lead. In the third quarter, the offense took off, with Philadelphia cruising to a 28–6 lead before Dallas turned the ball over three more times. The Eagles sent out their backups early in the 4th quarter and ultimately prevailed 34–6. With this victory, the Eagles won in Dallas for the first time since 2017.

==== Week 11: vs. Washington Commanders ====
Week 11: Washington Commanders at Philadelphia Eagles – Game summary

Quarter	1	2	3	4	Total
Commanders	7	0	3	8	**18**
**Eagles**	0	3	3	20	**26**

at Lincoln Financial Field, Philadelphia, Pennsylvania

- Date: November 14
- Game time: 8:15 p.m. EST
- Game weather: Clear, 46 °F (8 °C)
- Game attendance: 69,879
- Referee: Adrian Hill
- TV announcers (WTXF): Al Michaels, Kirk Herbstreit, and Kaylee Hartung
  Game exclusive to WTXF and WTTG. On Prime Video out of market.
- Recap, Game Book

Game information

**First quarter**

- WAS – Brian Robinson Jr. 1-yard run (Zane Gonzalez kick), 3:26. Commanders 7–0. **Drive: 4 plays, 58 yards, 1:59.**

**Second quarter**

- PHI – Jake Elliott 21-yard field goal, 0:19. Commanders 7–3. **Drive: 15 plays, 87 yards, 3:52.**

**Third quarter**

- WAS – Zane Gonzalez 45-yard field goal, 11:03. Commanders 10–3. **Drive: 8 plays, 42 yards, 3:57.**
- PHI – Jake Elliott 31-yard field goal, 5:32. Commanders 10–6. **Drive: 10 plays, 74 yards, 5:31.**

**Fourth quarter**

- PHI – Jalen Hurts 1-yard run (kick failed, wide left), 12:00. Eagles 12–10. **Drive: 11 plays, 76 yards, 5:27.**
- PHI – Saquon Barkley 23-yard run (Jake Elliott kick), 4:58. Eagles 19–10. **Drive: 5 plays, 74 yards, 2:57.**
- PHI – Saquon Barkley 39-yard run (Jake Elliott kick), 4:38. Eagles 26–10. **Drive: 2 plays, 46 yards, 0:12.**
- WAS – Zach Ertz 5-yard pass from Jayden Daniels (Jayden Daniels–Zach Ertz pass), 0:28. Eagles 26–18. **Drive: 15 plays, 70 yards, 4:10.**

**Top passers**

- WAS – Jayden Daniels – 22/32, 191 yards, TD, INT
- PHI – Jalen Hurts – 18/28, 221 yards

**Top rushers**

- WAS – Brian Robinson Jr. – 16 rushes, 63 yards, TD
- PHI – Saquon Barkley – 26 rushes, 146 yards, 2 TD

**Top receivers**

- WAS – Austin Ekeler – 8 receptions, 89 yards
- PHI – A. J. Brown – 5 receptions, 65 yards

The Commanders jumped out to a 10–3 lead deep into the third quarter thanks to both a poor offense and special teams by Philadelphia, including Jake Elliott missing field goals from 44 and 51 yards. However, Philadelphia managed to score a field goal and force a punt, which they then capitalized on by scoring a touchdown to take a 12–10 lead following a missed extra point. The Commanders marched to the Philadelphia 25-yard line but Commanders head coach Dan Quinn chose to go for it on 4th and 2, which the Eagles stopped. The Eagles proceeded to score a touchdown to take a 19–10 lead before Jayden Daniels threw an interception to Reed Blankenship. Following the interception, Saquon Barkley ran for a 39 yard touchdown to give the Eagles a 26–10 lead. While Jayden Daniels' touchdown pass to former Eagle Zach Ertz trimmed Washington's deficit to 26–18 with 28 seconds remaining, the Commanders failed to recover the ensuing onside kick, sealing the win for Philadelphia.

==== Week 12: at Los Angeles Rams ====
Week 12: Philadelphia Eagles at Los Angeles Rams – Game summary

Quarter	1	2	3	4	Total
**Eagles**	3	10	14	10	**37**
Rams	7	0	7	6	**20**

at SoFi Stadium, Inglewood, California

- Date: November 24
- Game time: 8:20 p.m. EST/5:20 p.m. PST
- Game weather: Clear, 57 °F (14 °C) (fixed roof)
- Game attendance: 74,400
- Referee: Land Clark
- TV announcers (NBC): Mike Tirico, Cris Collinsworth and Melissa Stark
- Recap, Game Book

Game information

**First quarter**

- PHI – Jake Elliott 21-yard field goal, 5:13. Eagles 3–0. **Drive: 12 plays, 80 yards, 7:19.**
- LAR – Kyren Williams 1-yard run (Joshua Karty kick), 1:02. Rams 7–3. **Drive: 9 plays, 70 yards, 4:11.**

**Second quarter**

- PHI – Jake Elliott 31-yard field goal, 6:17. Rams 7–6. **Drive: 10 plays, 51 yards, 5:23.**
- PHI – A. J. Brown 6-yard pass from Jalen Hurts (Jake Elliott kick), 1:27. Eagles 13–7. **Drive: 10 plays, 62 yards, 2:46.**

**Third quarter**

- PHI – Saquon Barkley 70-yard run (Jake Elliott kick), 14:49. Eagles 20–7. **Drive: 1 play, 70 yards, 0:11.**
- LAR – Demarcus Robinson 2-yard pass from Matthew Stafford (Joshua Karty kick), 10:51. Eagles 20–14. **Drive: 8 plays, 70 yards, 3:58.**
- PHI – Kenneth Gainwell 13-yard run (Jake Elliott kick), 6:17. Eagles 27–14. **Drive: 8 plays, 70 yards, 4:34.**

**Fourth quarter**

- PHI – Jake Elliott 26-yard field goal, 10:30. Eagles 30–14. **Drive: 12 plays, 55 yards, 6:02.**
- PHI – Saquon Barkley 72-yard run (Jake Elliott kick), 2:44. Eagles 37–14. **Drive: 6 plays, 91 yards, 2:29.**
- LAR – Cooper Kupp 27-yard pass from Matthew Stafford (pass failed), 1:07. Eagles 37–20. **Drive: 8 plays, 68 yards, 1:37.**

**Top passers**

- PHI – Jalen Hurts – 15/22, 179 yards, TD
- LAR – Matthew Stafford – 24/36, 243 yards, 2 TD

**Top rushers**

- PHI – Saquon Barkley – 26 rushes, 255 yards, 2 TD
- LAR – Kyren Williams – 16 rushes, 72 yards, TD

**Top receivers**

- PHI – A. J. Brown – 6 receptions, 109 yards, TD
- LAR – Puka Nacua – 9 receptions, 117 yards

Following a fumble recovery on the opening drive, the Eagles took a 3–0 lead on a 21-yard field goal from Jake Elliott. However, the Rams scored a touchdown to take a 7–3 lead at the end of the first quarter. The Eagles answered with another field goal by Elliott, then claimed a 13–7 lead on a 6-yard reception by A. J. Brown before halftime and would never look back. Immediately out of halftime, Saquon Barkley rushed for a 70-yard touchdown to take a 20–7 lead. The Rams responded with a touchdown to cut the lead to 20–14, but the Eagles scored a touchdown to take a 27–14 lead. Following a missed field goal from the Rams, the Eagles kicked a field goal to take a 30–14 lead. After sacking Matthew Stafford to set up a 4th-and-33, the Rams were forced to punt the ball away with only 5 minutes and 13 seconds remaining. The Eagles and Rams then exchanged touchdowns for a 37–20 final score. During the game, Saquon Barkley recorded 255 rushing yards and 302 total yards, setting two franchise records.

==== Week 13: at Baltimore Ravens ====
Week 13: Philadelphia Eagles at Baltimore Ravens – Game summary

Quarter	1	2	3	4	Total
**Eagles**	0	14	0	10	**24**
Ravens	9	3	0	7	**19**

at M&T Bank Stadium, Baltimore, Maryland

- Date: December 1
- Game time: 4:25 p.m. EST
- Game weather: Cloudy, 41 °F (5 °C)
- Game attendance: 71,344
- Referee: Craig Wrolstad
- TV announcers (CBS): Jim Nantz, Tony Romo and Tracy Wolfson
- Recap, Game Book

Game information

**First quarter**

- BAL – Justin Tucker 34-yard field goal, 9:21. Ravens 3–0. **Drive: 7 plays, 51 yards, 3:49.**
- BAL – Mark Andrews 14-yard pass from Lamar Jackson (kick failed, hit left upright), 3:49. Ravens 9–0. **Drive: 8 plays, 82 yards, 4:38.**

**Second quarter**

- PHI – Dallas Goedert 17-yard pass from Jalen Hurts (Jake Elliott kick), 8:04. Ravens 9–7. **Drive: 6 plays, 49 yards, 2:51.**
- PHI – Jalen Hurts 1-yard run (Jake Elliott kick), 2:00. Eagles 14–9. **Drive: 9 plays, 68 yards, 4:02.**
- BAL – Justin Tucker 50-yard field goal, 0:03. Eagles 14–12. **Drive: 8 plays, 27 yards, 1:57.**

**Third quarter**

- No scoring plays.

**Fourth quarter**

- PHI – Saquon Barkley 25-yard run (Jake Elliott kick), 7:56. Eagles 21–12. **Drive: 7 plays, 71 yards, 3:24.**
- PHI – Jake Elliott 35-yard field goal, 1:03. Eagles 24–12. **Drive: 11 plays, 25 yards, 5:08.**
- BAL – Isaiah Likely 11-yard pass from Lamar Jackson (Justin Tucker kick), 0:03. Eagles 24–19. **Drive: 7 plays, 70 yards, 1:00.**

**Top passers**

- PHI – Jalen Hurts – 11/19, 118 yards, TD
- BAL – Lamar Jackson – 23/36, 237 yards, 2 TD

**Top rushers**

- PHI – Saquon Barkley – 23 rushes, 107 yards, TD
- BAL – Derrick Henry – 19 rushes, 82 yards

**Top receivers**

- PHI – A. J. Brown – 5 receptions, 66 yards
- BAL – Zay Flowers – 3 receptions, 74 yards

The Eagles started slow, stalling on all of their first-quarter possessions. Meanwhile, the Ravens kicked a field goal on their first possession and then scored a touchdown on their next possession: a pass to Mark Andrews. After this touchdown, however, kicker Justin Tucker missed the extra point, leaving the score at 9–0 Ravens. After a better offensive and defensive effort, the Eagles scored their first touchdown midway through the second quarter on a touchdown pass to Dallas Goedert. The Eagles extended their lead to 14–9, but the Ravens managed to kick a field goal just before halftime, bringing the score to 14–12, with the Eagles still in the lead. The Ravens missed two field goals in the third quarter, but the Eagles could not capitalize on either of their opportunities offensively. After stopping the Ravens' offense in the fourth quarter, the Eagles got the ball back, and they capped off their drive with a Saquon Barkley touchdown run to take a two-score lead. On the next possession, the Ravens were faced with a 4th-and-8 deep in their own territory. They decided to go for it, but Lamar Jackson's pass was tipped by Tristin McCollum and fell incomplete, and the Eagles got the ball back. They would kick a field goal to take a 24–12 lead with just over a minute to go in the game. The Ravens drove down the field and scored a touchdown with three seconds left to go in the game following a touchdown pass to Isaiah Likely, but they failed to recover the ensuing onside kick, sealing the 24–19 win for Philadelphia.

With the win, the Eagles improved to a 10–2 record. This was their eighth straight win dating back to their Week 5 bye. Philadelphia recorded their first-ever road win over the Ravens and their first win in Baltimore since defeating the Colts in the 1978 season.

==== Week 14: vs. Carolina Panthers ====
Week 14: Carolina Panthers at Philadelphia Eagles – Game summary

Quarter	1	2	3	4	Total
Panthers	3	7	6	0	**16**
**Eagles**	0	14	0	8	**22**

at Lincoln Financial Field, Philadelphia, Pennsylvania

- Date: December 8
- Game time: 1:00 p.m. EST
- Game weather: Clear, 55 °F (13 °C)
- Game attendance: 69,879
- Referee: Carl Cheffers
- TV announcers (Fox): Adam Amin, Mark Sanchez and Kristina Pink
- Recap, Game Book

Game information

**First quarter**

- CAR – Eddy Piñeiro 38-yard field goal, 1:09. Panthers 3–0. **Drive: 5 plays, 27 yards, 1:52.**

**Second quarter**

- PHI – Jalen Hurts 1-yard run (Jake Elliott kick), 11:48. Eagles 7–3. **Drive: 10 plays, 70 yards, 4:21.**
- CAR – Tommy Tremble 3-yard pass from Bryce Young (Eddy Piñeiro kick), 4:00. Panthers 10–7. **Drive: 14 plays, 69 yards, 7:48.**
- PHI – DeVonta Smith 4-yard pass from Jalen Hurts (Jake Elliott kick), 0:14. Eagles 14–10. **Drive: 7 plays, 44 yards, 1:36.**

**Third quarter**

- CAR – Chuba Hubbard 1-yard run (kick failed, wide left), 2:49. Panthers 16–14. **Drive: 12 plays, 58 yards, 7:53.**

**Fourth quarter**

- PHI – Grant Calcaterra 4-yard pass from Jalen Hurts (Saquon Barkley run), 13:45. Eagles 22–16. **Drive: 8 plays, 70 yards, 4:04.**

**Top passers**

- CAR – Bryce Young – 19/34, 191 yards, TD, INT
- PHI – Jalen Hurts – 14/21, 108 yards, 2 TD

**Top rushers**

- CAR – Chuba Hubbard – 26 rushes, 92 yards, TD
- PHI – Saquon Barkley – 20 rushes, 124 yards

**Top receivers**

- CAR – Adam Thielen – 9 receptions, 102 yards
- PHI – A. J. Brown – 4 receptions, 43 yards

Following a back-and-forth affair, the Eagles had the ball up 22–16. After their final drive stalled past midfield, the Eagles punted the football back to Carolina and pinned the ball inside the 5-yard line. Despite the Panthers getting as close as the opposite 37 yard line, wide receiver Xavier Legette dropped a go-ahead touchdown pass on 2nd down; two plays later, the Eagles defense stopped the Panthers on a 4th-and-9 to secure the 22–16 win. The Eagles improved to 11–2 with the victory, and following losses by the Falcons and Cardinals, clinched a playoff spot for the fourth consecutive year.

==== Week 15: vs. Pittsburgh Steelers ====
Week 15: Pittsburgh Steelers at Philadelphia Eagles – Game summary

Quarter	1	2	3	4	Total
Steelers	3	10	0	0	**13**
**Eagles**	10	7	3	7	**27**

at Lincoln Financial Field, Philadelphia, Pennsylvania

- Date: December 15
- Game time: 4:25 p.m. EST
- Game weather: Partly cloudy, 37 °F (3 °C)
- Game attendance: 69,879
- Referee: Alan Eck
- TV announcers (Fox): Kevin Burkhardt, Tom Brady, Erin Andrews and Tom Rinaldi
- Recap, Game Book

Game information

**First quarter**

- PHI – Jake Elliott 34-yard field goal, 9:56. Eagles 3–0. **Drive: 7 plays, 54 yards, 3:33.**
- PIT – Chris Boswell 37-yard field goal, 3:42. Tied 3–3. **Drive: 4 plays, −8 yards, 0:31.**
- PHI – A. J. Brown 5-yard pass from Jalen Hurts (Jake Elliott kick), 1:13. Eagles 10–3. **Drive: 6 plays, 70 yards, 2:29.**

**Second quarter**

- PHI – DeVonta Smith 2-yard pass from Jalen Hurts (Jake Elliott kick), 9:07. Eagles 17–3. **Drive: 9 plays, 45 yards, 4:33.**
- PIT – Pat Freiermuth 9-yard pass from Russell Wilson (Chris Boswell kick), 2:34. Eagles 17–10. **Drive: 11 plays, 70 yards, 6:33.**
- PIT – Chris Boswell 49-yard field goal, 0:37. Eagles 17–13. **Drive: 5 plays, 14 yards, 0:40.**

**Third quarter**

- PHI – Jake Elliott 41-yard field goal, 7:52. Eagles 20–13. **Drive: 13 plays, 47 yards, 7:08.**

**Fourth quarter**

- PHI – Jalen Hurts 1-yard run (Jake Elliott kick), 14:17. Eagles 27–13. **Drive: 13 plays, 74 yards, 6:33.**

**Top passers**

- PIT – Russell Wilson – 14/22, 128 yards, TD
- PHI – Jalen Hurts – 25/32, 290 yards, 2 TD

**Top rushers**

- PIT – Najee Harris – 6 rushes, 14 yards
- PHI – Saquon Barkley – 19 rushes, 65 yards

**Top receivers**

- PIT – Calvin Austin – 5 receptions, 65 yards
- PHI – A. J. Brown – 8 receptions, 110 yards, TD

The Battle of Pennsylvania ended in a 27–13 Eagles victory. Despite struggling with turnovers early on, the Eagles would correct their course and ultimately win the game decisively. The Eagles won a franchise-record 10th straight game since the bye week and also won their 11th straight home matchup against the Steelers in the Super Bowl era. With the win, they swept the entire AFC North. They also beat Russell Wilson for the first time ever after losing their previous six matchups against Wilson during his time in Seattle.

==== Week 16: at Washington Commanders ====
Week 16: Philadelphia Eagles at Washington Commanders – Game summary

Quarter	1	2	3	4	Total
Eagles	21	0	6	6	**33**
**Commanders**	7	7	0	22	**36**

at Northwest Stadium, Landover, Maryland

- Date: December 22
- Game time: 1:00 p.m. EST
- Game weather: Sunny, 32 °F (0 °C)
- Game attendance: 64,128
- Referee: Shawn Smith
- TV announcers (Fox): Joe Davis, Greg Olsen and Pam Oliver
- Recap, Game Book

Game information

**First quarter**

- PHI – Saquon Barkley 2-yard run (Jake Elliott kick), 11:15. Eagles 7–0. **Drive: 8 plays, 49 yards, 2:56.**
- PHI – A. J. Brown 4-yard pass from Kenny Pickett (Jake Elliott kick), 7:08. Eagles 14–0. **Drive: 8 plays, 57 yards, 3:53.**
- WAS – Jamison Crowder 6-yard pass from Jayden Daniels (Zane Gonzalez kick), 3:12. Eagles 14–7. **Drive: 4 plays, 25 yards, 1:18.**
- PHI – Saquon Barkley 68-yard run (Jake Elliott kick), 2:18. Eagles 21–7. **Drive: 2 plays, 69 yards, 0:54.**

**Second quarter**

- WAS – Terry McLaurin 32-yard pass from Jayden Daniels (Zane Gonzalez kick), 6:46. Eagles 21–14. **Drive: 8 plays, 96 yards, 3:43.**

**Third quarter**

- PHI – Jake Elliott 24-yard field goal, 11:40. Eagles 24–14. **Drive: 6 plays, 69 yards, 3:20.**
- PHI – Jake Elliott 40-yard field goal, 3:11. Eagles 27–14. **Drive: 14 plays, 36 yards, 8:13.**

**Fourth quarter**

- WAS – Olamide Zaccheaus 4-yard pass from Jayden Daniels (Zane Gonzalez kick), 13:33. Eagles 27–21. **Drive: 11 plays, 61 yards, 4:38.**
- WAS – Olamide Zaccheaus 49-yard pass from Jayden Daniels (Zane Gonzalez kick), 9:06. Commanders 28–27. **Drive: 7 plays, 87 yards, 2:04.**
- PHI – Jake Elliott 50-yard field goal, 3:48. Eagles 30–28. **Drive: 12 plays, 34 yards, 5:18.**
- PHI – Jake Elliott 40-yard field goal, 1:58. Eagles 33–28. **Drive: 4 plays, 5 yards, 0:55.**
- WAS – Jamison Crowder 9-yard pass from Jayden Daniels (Jeremy McNichols run), 0:06. Commanders 36–33. **Drive: 9 plays, 57 yards, 1:52.**

**Top passers**

- PHI – Kenny Pickett – 14/24, 143 yards, TD, INT
- WAS – Jayden Daniels – 24/39, 258 yards, 5 TD, 2 INT

**Top rushers**

- PHI – Saquon Barkley – 29 rushes, 150 yards, 2 TD
- WAS – Jayden Daniels – 9 rushes, 81 yards

**Top receivers**

- PHI – A. J. Brown – 8 receptions, 97 yards, TD
- WAS – Olamide Zaccheaus – 5 receptions, 70 yards, 2 TD

The Eagles initially had a 14-point lead in the first quarter, but an injury to Jalen Hurts allowed the Commanders to cut the Eagles' lead to 21–14 by halftime after a missed 56 yard field goal. Backup Kenny Pickett played out the remainder of the game as Hurts would not return, ultimately throwing 24 passes in relief. Despite the Eagles taking a 27–14 lead into the fourth quarter, back to back scoring drives gave the Commanders a 28–27 lead. The Eagles retook the lead following a 50-yard field goal by Jake Elliott and then the Eagles defense picked off Jayden Daniels for Philadelphia’s 5th turnover forced on the day. However, after wide receiver DeVonta Smith dropped a pass which would have allowed the Eagles to score another first down, they were forced to kick a field goal to extend the lead slightly to 33–28. The Commanders then begun a game-clinching, 57-yard drive culminating in a 9-yard touchdown reception by Jamison Crowder with six seconds left, giving Washington the eventual 36–33 victory. The Eagles' loss was ultimately sealed during the final kick return after cornerback Avonte Maddox had the ball punched out of his hands by safety Quan Martin, which was then recovered by Benjamin St-Juste. Due to the loss, Philadelphia missed an opportunity to secure the NFC East. This loss also broke their 10-game winning streak.

==== Week 17: vs. Dallas Cowboys ====
Week 17: Dallas Cowboys at Philadelphia Eagles – Game summary

Quarter	1	2	3	4	Total
Cowboys	7	0	0	0	**7**
**Eagles**	7	17	10	7	**41**

at Lincoln Financial Field, Philadelphia, Pennsylvania

- Date: December 29
- Game time: 1:00 p.m. EST
- Game weather: Sunny, 62 °F (17 °C)
- Game attendance: 69,879
- Referee: Brad Allen
- TV announcers (Fox): Joe Davis, Greg Olsen and Pam Oliver
- Recap, Game Book

Game information

**First quarter**

- PHI – C. J. Gardner-Johnson 69-yard interception return (Jake Elliott kick), 11:43. Eagles 7–0.
- DAL – Jalen Tolbert 4-yard pass from Cooper Rush (Brandon Aubrey kick), 5:38. Tied 7–7. **Drive: 12 plays, 70 yards, 6:05.**

**Second quarter**

- PHI – DeVonta Smith 22-yard pass from Kenny Pickett (Jake Elliott kick), 6:38. Eagles 14–7. **Drive: 10 plays, 81 yards, 6:11.**
- PHI – Jake Elliott 31-yard field goal, 1:55. Eagles 17–7. **Drive: 11 plays, 26 yards, 4:35.**
- PHI – Kenny Pickett 1-yard run (Jake Elliott kick), 0:00. Eagles 24–7. **Drive: 4 plays, 65 yards, 0:36.**

**Third quarter**

- PHI – Jake Elliott 26-yard field goal, 8:03. Eagles 27–7. **Drive: 12 plays, 59 yards, 6:57.**
- PHI – A. J. Brown 20-yard pass from Tanner McKee (Jake Elliott kick), 2:44. Eagles 34–7. **Drive: 8 plays, 65 yards, 3:50.**

**Fourth quarter**

- PHI – DeVonta Smith 25-yard pass from Tanner McKee (Jake Elliott kick), 10:03. Eagles 41–7. **Drive: 7 plays, 75 yards, 4:22.**

**Top passers**

- DAL – Cooper Rush – 15/28, 147 yards, TD, 2 INT
- PHI – Kenny Pickett – 10/15, 143 yards, TD

**Top rushers**

- DAL – Rico Dowdle – 23 rushes, 104 yards
- PHI – Saquon Barkley – 31 rushes, 167 yards

**Top receivers**

- DAL – Brandin Cooks – 4 receptions, 52 yards
- PHI – DeVonta Smith – 6 receptions, 120 yards, 2 TD

Despite not having starting quarterback Jalen Hurts, backup quarterbacks Kenny Pickett and Tanner McKee guided the Eagles offense to 34 points. The Eagles defense held Dallas to one touchdown while also forcing four turnovers: a C. J. Gardner-Johnson pick-six, an Oren Burks fumble, another Gardner-Johnson interception, and a Nolan Smith fumble.

After several small fights throughout the early parts of the game, a massive fight broke out during the fourth quarter, resulting in the ejections of Cowboys players Jalen Brooks and Troy Pride as well as Eagles safety Sydney Brown.

With the win, the Eagles swept the Cowboys for the first time since 2011 and clinched the NFC East. Saquon Barkley reached 2,000 rushing yards, becoming the ninth running back in NFL history to do so. With the Vikings’ victory later in the day, the Eagles were locked into the NFC's #2 seed.

==== Week 18: vs. New York Giants ====
Week 18: New York Giants at Philadelphia Eagles – Game summary

Quarter	1	2	3	4	Total
Giants	0	0	3	10	**13**
**Eagles**	7	3	0	10	**20**

at Lincoln Financial Field, Philadelphia, Pennsylvania

- Date: January 5
- Game time: 1:00 p.m. EST
- Game weather: Clear, 31 °F (−1 °C)
- Game attendance: 69,879
- Referee: Ronald Torbert
- TV announcers (CBS): Andrew Catalon, Tiki Barber, Jason McCourty and A. J. Ross
- Recap, Game Book

Game information

**First quarter**

- PHI – Ainias Smith 15-yard pass from Tanner McKee (Jake Elliott kick), 6:51. Eagles 7–0. **Drive: 4 plays, 51 yards, 2:01.**

**Second quarter**

- PHI – Jake Elliott 24-yard field goal, 1:44. Eagles 10–0. **Drive: 13 plays, 59 yards, 5:07.**

**Third quarter**

- NYG – Graham Gano 25-yard field goal, 7:34. Eagles 10–3. **Drive: 10 plays, 58 yards, 5:47.**

**Fourth quarter**

- PHI – E. J. Jenkins 7-yard pass from Tanner McKee (Jake Elliott kick), 14:55. Eagles 17–3. **Drive: 7 plays, 61 yards, 3:52.**
- NYG – Malik Nabers 45-yard pass from Drew Lock (Graham Gano kick), 10:32. Eagles 17–10. **Drive: 8 plays, 70 yards, 4:23.**
- NYG – Graham Gano 53-yard field goal, 7:21. Eagles 17–13. **Drive: 4 plays, 3 yards, 1:32.**
- PHI – Jake Elliott 32-yard field goal, 0:47. Eagles 20–13. **Drive: 16 plays, 56 yards, 6:34.**

**Top passers**

- NYG – Drew Lock – 22/29, 138 yards, TD, INT
- PHI – Tanner McKee – 27/41, 269 yards, 2 TD

**Top rushers**

- NYG – Tyrone Tracy Jr. – 14 rushes, 59 yards
- PHI – Will Shipley – 10 rushes, 32 yards

**Top receivers**

- NYG – Malik Nabers – 5 receptions, 64 yards, TD
- PHI – Jahan Dotson – 7 receptions, 94 yards

On December 31, 2024, the Eagles revealed they would wear their blackout alternate uniforms for their home contest against their divisional rival, the New York Giants. The Eagles rested a majority of their starters as it was no longer mathematically possible to improve their seeding. They went on to win by a final score of 20–13, which gave them their second 14-win season in the last three years. It was also the seventh time in the last eight divisional matchups Philadelphia toppled New York, dating back to December 2021, as well as their twelfth straight home win over the Giants, having last fallen to them at home in 2013.

=== Standings ===
==== Division ====
NFC East
	W	L	T	PCT	DIV	CONF	PF	PA	STK
^{(2)} Philadelphia Eagles	14	3	0	.824	5–1	9–3	463	303	W2
^{(6)} Washington Commanders	12	5	0	.706	4–2	9–3	485	391	W5
Dallas Cowboys	7	10	0	.412	3–3	5–7	350	468	L2
New York Giants	3	14	0	.176	0–6	1–11	273	415	L1

==== Conference ====
NFC
Seed	Team	Division	W	L	T	PCT	DIV	CONF	SOS	SOV	STK
**Division leaders**
1	Detroit Lions	North	15	2	0	.882	6–0	11–1	.516	.494	W3
2	Philadelphia Eagles	East	14	3	0	.824	5–1	9–3	.453	.424	W2
3 (Note: Tampa Bay clinched the #3 seed over Los Angeles based on conference record. (Tampa Bay 8–4 to Los Angeles 6–6))	Tampa Bay Buccaneers	South	10	7	0	.588	4–2	8–4	.502	.465	W2
4 (Note: Los Angeles clinched the NFC West and #4 seed over Seattle based on strength of victory. (Los Angeles .441 to Seattle .424))	Los Angeles Rams	West	10	7	0	.588	4–2	6–6	.505	.441	L1
**Wild cards**
5	Minnesota Vikings	North	14	3	0	.824	4–2	9–3	.474	.408	L1
6	Washington Commanders	East	12	5	0	.706	4–2	9–3	.436	.358	W5
7	Green Bay Packers	North	11	6	0	.647	1–5	6–6	.533	.412	L2
**Did not qualify for the postseason**
8	Seattle Seahawks	West	10	7	0	.588	4–2	6–6	.498	.424	W2
9 (Note: Atlanta finished ahead of Arizona based on conference record. (Atlanta 7–5 to Arizona 4–8))	Atlanta Falcons	South	8	9	0	.471	4–2	7–5	.519	.426	L2
10	Arizona Cardinals	West	8	9	0	.471	3–3	4–8	.536	.404	W1
11	Dallas Cowboys	East	7	10	0	.412	3–3	5–7	.522	.387	L2
12	San Francisco 49ers	West	6	11	0	.353	1–5	4–8	.564	.402	L4
13 (Note: Chicago finished ahead of Carolina based on head-to-head victory.)	Chicago Bears	North	5	12	0	.294	1–5	3–9	.554	.388	W1
14 (Note: Carolina finished ahead of New Orleans based on strength of victory. (Carolina .329 to New Orleans .306))	Carolina Panthers	South	5	12	0	.294	2–4	4–8	.498	.329	W1
15	New Orleans Saints	South	5	12	0	.294	2–4	4–8	.505	.306	L4
16	New York Giants	East	3	14	0	.176	0–6	1–11	.554	.412	L1
**Tiebreakers** (Note: When breaking ties for three or more teams under the NFL's rules, they are first broken within divisions, then comparing only the highest ranked remaining team from each division.)

== Postseason ==
=== Schedule ===
Round	Date	Opponent (seed)	Result	Record	Venue	Recap
Wild Card	January 12	Green Bay Packers (7)	W 22–10	1–0	Lincoln Financial Field	Recap
Divisional	January 19	Los Angeles Rams (4)	W 28–22	2–0	Lincoln Financial Field	Recap
NFC Championship	January 26	Washington Commanders (6)	W 55–23	3–0	Lincoln Financial Field	Recap
Super Bowl LIX	February 9	vs. Kansas City Chiefs (A1)	W 40–22	4–0	Caesars Superdome	Recap

=== Game summaries ===
==== NFC Wild Card Playoffs: vs. (7) Green Bay Packers ====
NFC Wild Card Playoffs: (7) Green Bay Packers at (2) Philadelphia Eagles – Game summary

Quarter	1	2	3	4	Total
Packers	0	0	3	7	10
Eagles	10	0	6	6	22

at Lincoln Financial Field, Philadelphia, Pennsylvania

- Date: January 12, 2025
- Game time: 4:30 p.m. EST
- Game weather: Cloudy, 40 °F (4 °C)
- Game attendance: 69,879
- Referee: Brad Allen
- TV announcers (Fox): Kevin Burkhardt, Tom Brady, Erin Andrews and Tom Rinaldi
- Recap, Game Book

Game information

First quarter

- PHI – Jahan Dotson 11-yard pass from Jalen Hurts (Jake Elliott kick), 13:21. Eagles 7–0. Drive: 3 plays, 28 yards, 1:32.
- PHI – Jake Elliott 31-yard field goal, 0:19. Eagles 10–0. Drive: 11 plays, 57 yards, 5:00.

Second quarter

- No scoring plays

Third quarter

- GB – Brandon McManus 26-yard field goal, 5:46. Eagles 10–3. Drive: 12 plays, 76 yards, 5:47.
- PHI – Dallas Goedert 24-yard pass from Jalen Hurts (kick failed), 3:20. Eagles 16–3. Drive: 5 plays, 68 yards, 2:26.

Fourth quarter

- GB – Josh Jacobs 1-yard run (Brandon McManus kick), 14:56. Eagles 16–10. Drive: 9 plays, 78 yards, 3:24.
- PHI – Jake Elliott 30-yard field goal, 7:33. Eagles 19–10. Drive: 13 plays, 58 yards, 7:23.
- PHI – Jake Elliott 32-yard field goal, 3:12. Eagles 22–10. Drive: 6 plays, 27 yards, 1:46.

Top passers

- GB – Jordan Love – 20/33, 212 yards, 3 INT
- PHI – Jalen Hurts – 13/21, 131 yards, 2 TD

Top rushers

- GB – Josh Jacobs – 18 rushes, 81 yards, TD
- PHI – Saquon Barkley – 25 rushes, 119 yards

Top receivers

- GB – Jayden Reed – 4 receptions, 46 yards
- PHI – DeVonta Smith – 4 receptions, 55 yards

The Eagles defeated the Green Bay Packers by a 22–10 margin. Philadelphia and Green Bay had previously played each other in Week 1, a 34–29 Eagles victory in Brazil. The Packers had finished the 2024 regular season with an 11–6 record, the best ever by an NFC #7 seed. Eagles starting quarterback Jalen Hurts was cleared from concussion protocol after having missed most of Week 16 and all of Week 17-18, returning to start the playoff run while also continuing to nurse a broken finger on his non-throwing hand, while Packers quarterback Jordan Love was looking to repeat his success from the 2023–24 NFL playoffs.

On the opening kickoff, Eagles linebacker Oren Burks forced a fumble from Packers cornerback Keisean Nixon with linebacker Jeremiah Trotter recovering the ball on the Green Bay 28-yard line. Hurts found Jahan Dotson for a touchdown reception three plays later to open the scoring. Later in the quarter, the Eagles added a Jake Elliott field goal to complete an 11-play drive and extend the lead to 10–0. Interceptions by Darius Slay and Zack Baun helped hold Green Bay scoreless through the second quarter. The Packers cut the lead to 10–3 with a field goal in the third quarter, but the Eagles quickly responded with a 5-play drive featuring a 28-yard reception by DeVonta Smith and a 24-yard touchdown reception by tight end Dallas Goedert, in which he stiff-armed Packer corner Carrington Valentine multiple times on his way to the end zone. The play put Philadelphia ahead 16–3, but on Green Bay's ensuing possession, running back Josh Jacobs broke through for a 32-yard run, then scored from a yard out on the next play to make it 16–10 early in the fourth quarter.

Hurts led the Eagles on a 13-play field goal drive that ate up 7:23 of game clock to make it 19–10 Philadelphia. Green Bay went for it fourth down on their next possession, but Malik Heath could not bring in Love's pass and keep his feet inbounds. An unnecessary roughness penalty on Packers' defensive lineman T.J. Slaton for a late-hit on Saquon Barkley extended Philadelphia's next drive and led to a 32-yard Elliott field goal and a 22–10 lead. Quinyon Mitchell then intercepted Love in the end zone to put to rest any Green Bay comeback hopes.

Barkley finished the game with 25 carries for 119 yards and seemingly would have had more if he didn't choose to slide down at the Philadelphia 41-yard line with open field ahead of him on the Eagles' final possession. The Eagles won the turnover differential 4–0, carried by three interceptions of Love, while Nolan Smith chipped in a pair of sacks. The Packers were further hindered by four starters, including their top two receivers (Romeo Doubs and Jayden Reed), leaving the game due to injury. This was the Eagles' first Wild Card victory at home since 2006.

==== NFC Divisional Playoffs: vs. (4) Los Angeles Rams ====
NFC Divisional Playoffs: (4) Los Angeles Rams at (2) Philadelphia Eagles – Game summary

Quarter	1	2	3	4	Total
Rams	7	3	5	7	22
Eagles	13	0	3	12	28

at Lincoln Financial Field, Philadelphia, Pennsylvania

- Date: January 19, 2025
- Game time: 3:00 p.m. EST
- Game weather: Snow, 34 °F (1 °C)
- Game attendance: 69,879
- Referee: Shawn Smith
- TV announcers (NBC): Mike Tirico, Cris Collinsworth, Melissa Stark and Kaylee Hartung
- Recap, Game Book

Game information

First quarter

- PHI – Jalen Hurts 44-yard run (kick failed), 11:55. Eagles 6–0. Drive: 6 plays, 74 yards, 3:05.
- LAR – Tyler Higbee 4-yard pass from Matthew Stafford (Joshua Karty kick), 6:32. Rams 7–6. Drive: 13 plays, 67 yards, 5:23.
- PHI – Saquon Barkley 62-yard run (Jake Elliott kick), 1:07. Eagles 13–7. Drive: 3 plays, 83 yards, 1:34.

Second quarter

- LAR – Joshua Karty 30-yard field goal, 12:47. Eagles 13–10. Drive: 6 plays, 58 yards, 3:20.

Third quarter

- LAR – Joshua Karty 34-yard field goal, 7:37. Tied 13–13. Drive: 8 plays, 58 yards, 4:22.
- PHI – Jake Elliott 44-yard field goal, 2:19. Eagles 16–13. Drive: 9 plays, 44 yards, 5:18.
- LAR – Jalen Hurts sacked in the end zone for a safety, 0:26. Eagles 16–15.

Fourth quarter

- PHI – Jake Elliott 23-yard field goal, 13:23. Eagles 19–15. Drive: 4 plays, 5 yards, 1:26.
- PHI – Jake Elliott 37-yard field goal, 6:18. Eagles 22–15. Drive: 8 plays, 19 yards, 4:46.
- PHI – Saquon Barkley 78-yard run (kick failed), 4:36. Eagles 28–15. Drive: 1 play, 78 yards, 0:11.
- LAR – Colby Parkinson 4-yard pass from Matthew Stafford (Joshua Karty kick), 2:48. Eagles 28–22. Drive: 10 plays, 70 yards, 1:48.

Top passers

- LAR – Matthew Stafford – 26/44, 324 yards, 2 TD
- PHI – Jalen Hurts – 15/20, 128 yards

Top rushers

- LAR – Kyren Williams – 19 rushes, 106 yards
- PHI – Saquon Barkley – 26 rushes, 205 yards, 2 TD

Top receivers

- LAR – Puka Nacua – 6 receptions, 97 yards
- PHI – Dallas Goedert – 4 receptions, 56 yards

The Eagles defeated the Los Angeles Rams 28–22 in a contest heavily impacted by winter weather in the second half. In Week 12, Philadelphia had defeated the Rams 37–20 at SoFi Stadium as Saquon Barkley set the Eagles franchise record for rushing yards in a single game with 255. His performance included touchdown runs of 72 and 70 yards. Much of the pregame attention focused on disparaging comments about Philadelphia fans made by Rams rookie linebacker Jared Verse.

Philadelphia scored on the opening drive on a 44-yard touchdown run by Jalen Hurts, but Jake Elliott missed the extra point leaving the Eagles with a 6–0 lead. The Rams answered with a 13-play touchdown drive, capped by a 4-yard Tyler Higbee touchdown reception, to take a 7–6 lead. Later in the opening quarter, Saquon Barkley broke a 62-yard touchdown run to the right side to give the Eagles a 13–7 lead. Los Angeles responded with a field goal to cut the Eagles lead to 13–10, and timely sacks by Verse prevented Philadelphia from scoring on either of its second quarter possessions. As the third quarter began, heavy snow was falling and accumulating on the field surface. Following another field goal by the Rams, the score was tied 13–13 midway through the third quarter. The Eagles responded with a 44-yard Elliott field goal to take a 16–13 lead, but after getting pinned deep in their own territory, Hurts took a sack in the end zone for a safety to cut the Eagles lead to one point. However, on the opening play of the fourth quarter with the Rams driving, Jalen Carter punched the ball away from Kyren Williams, with Isaiah Rodgers recovering the fumble and returning it to the Rams 10-yard line. A false start penalty took a would-be Hurts touchdown off the board, forcing the Eagles to settle for a field goal and a 19–15 lead. On Los Angeles' next drive, Matthew Stafford was strip sacked by Nolan Smith, with Zack Baun recovering at the Rams 38-yard line. The Eagles converted another field goal to extend the lead to 22–15. Following a three-and-out by the Rams, Barkley broke loose in the snow down the left sideline for a 78-yard touchdown with under five minutes to play, but another missed extra point kept the Eagles lead to 28–15. The Rams, in a hurry up offense, proceeded to score a touchdown to cut the Eagles lead to 28–22. The Eagles quickly went three-and-out, taking only 13 seconds off the clock, before Braden Mann hit a 55-yard punt to pin the Rams at their 18-yard line. Stafford again drove down the field, completing a 37-yard sideline pass to Puka Nacua inside the red zone. However, Carter came up with a season-saving sack on third down, then pressured Stafford into an errant throw on the resulting fourth down, sealing the win for Philadelphia.

With the victory, the Eagles advanced to their second NFC Championship game in three years. Barkley finished with 205 rushing yards, making him the first player to rush for more than 200 yards against the same opponent during the regular season and playoffs. The Eagles' defense sacked Stafford five times, with Carter responsible for two of them.

==== NFC Championship: vs. (6) Washington Commanders ====
NFC Championship: (6) Washington Commanders at (2) Philadelphia Eagles – Game summary

Quarter	1	2	3	4	Total
Commanders	3	12	8	0	23
Eagles	14	13	7	21	55

at Lincoln Financial Field, Philadelphia, Pennsylvania

- Date: January 26, 2025
- Game time: 3:05 p.m. EST
- Game weather: Cloudy, 40 °F (4 °C)
- Game attendance: 69,879
- Referee: Shawn Hochuli
- TV announcers (Fox): Kevin Burkhardt, Tom Brady, Erin Andrews and Tom Rinaldi
- Recap, Game Book

Game information

First quarter

- WAS – Zane Gonzalez 34-yard field goal, 7:57. Commanders 3–0. Drive: 18 plays, 54 yards, 7:03.
- PHI – Saquon Barkley 60-yard run (Jake Elliott kick), 7:39. Eagles 7–3. Drive: 1 play, 60 yards, 0:18.
- PHI – Saquon Barkley 4-yard run (Jake Elliott kick), 3:43. Eagles 14–3. Drive: 6 plays, 48 yards, 2:02.

Second quarter

- WAS – Zane Gonzalez 46-yard field goal, 14:42. Eagles 14–6. Drive: 10 plays, 45 yards, 4:01.
- WAS – Terry McLaurin 36-yard pass from Jayden Daniels (pass failed), 7:05. Eagles 14–12. Drive: 5 plays, 56 yards, 1:44.
- PHI – Jalen Hurts 1-yard run (run failed), 1:44. Eagles 20–12. Drive: 12 plays, 72 yards, 5:21.
- PHI – A. J. Brown 4-yard pass from Jalen Hurts (Jake Elliott kick), 0:39. Eagles 27–12. Drive: 7 plays, 24 yards, 0:57.
- WAS – Zane Gonzalez 42-yard field goal, 0:02. Eagles 27–15. Drive: 5 plays, 46 yards, 0:37.

Third quarter

- PHI – Jalen Hurts 9-yard run (Jake Elliott kick), 8:58. Eagles 34–15. Drive: 4 plays, 58 yards, 1:49.
- WAS – Jayden Daniels 10-yard run (Jayden Daniels–Olamide Zaccheaus pass), 5:01. Eagles 34–23. Drive: 8 plays, 70 yards, 3:57.

Fourth quarter

- PHI – Jalen Hurts 1-yard run (Jake Elliott kick), 12:24. Eagles 41–23. Drive: 5 plays, 51 yards, 2:58.
- PHI – Saquon Barkley 4-yard run (Jake Elliott kick), 7:58. Eagles 48–23. Drive: 4 plays, 31 yards, 2:21.
- PHI – Will Shipley 2-yard run (Jake Elliott kick), 3:03. Eagles 55–23. Drive: 4 plays, 80 yards, 1:48.

Top passers

- WAS – Jayden Daniels – 29/48, 255 yards, TD, INT
- PHI – Jalen Hurts – 20/28, 246 yards, TD

Top rushers

- WAS – Jayden Daniels – 6 rushes, 48 yards, TD
- PHI – Saquon Barkley – 15 rushes, 118 yards, 3 TD

Top receivers

- WAS – Zach Ertz – 11 receptions, 104 yards
- PHI – A. J. Brown – 6 receptions, 96 yards, TD

The Eagles exploded for 55 points in a lopsided win against their division rival, Washington Commanders. The game marked the second ever playoff meeting between Washington and Philadelphia; their first came in the 1990 NFC Wild Card Game, where the Redskins defeated the Eagles 20–6 at Veterans Stadium. This was the first time the NFC Championship featured a divisional matchup since the Los Angeles Rams and San Francisco 49ers from the NFC West met in the 2021–22 playoffs, and the first involving NFC East sides since the New York Giants played the Redskins in 1986–87. During the 2024 regular season, the Eagles and Commanders split the series, with the Eagles winning 26–18 during Week 11 in Philadelphia, and the Commanders winning 36–33 during Week 16 in Washington. The Commanders were coming off a 45–31 upset of the top-seeded Detroit Lions, and Jayden Daniels was looking to become the first rookie quarterback to lead his team to the Super Bowl.

Daniels converted two fourth downs on the opening 18-play drive. However, the Commanders settled for a field goal. On the Eagles' first offensive play, Saquon Barkley broke a 60-yard touchdown run to make it 7–3. Linebacker Zack Baun forced a fumble on Washington's next drive, recovered by safety Reed Blankenship. The Eagles capitalized with a 4-yard Barkley touchdown run to increase the lead to 14–3. In the second quarter, Washington narrowed their deficit to 14–12 with a field goal (capping off a drive extended by a successful fake punt), followed by a 36-yard Terry McLaurin touchdown reception after a missed 54-yard field goal attempt by Eagles kicker Jake Elliott gave the Commanders a short field. Facing a 4th-and-5 from the Washington 45-yard line on the Eagles' ensuing drive, Jalen Hurts connected on a 31-yard pass to A. J. Brown. This crucial conversation led to points on a 1-yard "tush push" touchdown by Hurts. With less than two minutes left in the half, the Commanders fumbled the kickoff return, giving the Eagles the ball back. Hurts would complete a 4-yard touchdown pass to Brown to extend the lead to 27–12. Washington added another field goal to make the halftime score 27–15.

In the third quarter, Hurts scored his second rushing touchdown, a 9-yard scamper to the left side to make it 34–15. Daniels responded with a rushing touchdown of his own, followed by a successful two-point conversion, to keep Washington within two scores. After an Eagles punt, Washington drove to midfield, but turned the ball over again, this time linebacker Oren Burks punching the ball away from Austin Ekeler. Philadelphia now began to pull away. A 22-yard rush by Barkley to the 1-yard line was followed by four straight offsides/encroachment penalties by the Commanders defense. After the fourth consecutive penalty, referee Shaun Hochuli advised Washington that if another encroachment penalty occurred, Philadelphia would automatically be awarded 6 points. Hurts eventually scored another tush push touchdown to increase the lead to 41–23. A fourth down sack by Nolan Smith ended Washington's next drive, and Barkley put the game away with his third touchdown, a 4-yard rush to the right side. Rookie cornerback Quinyon Mitchell would then intercept a Daniels heave into in the end zone, battling McLaurin on the play. Rookie Will Shipley then ripped off a 57-yard rush, and finished the drive with a 4-yard touchdown to bring the score to 55–23.

Former Eagles' tight end Zach Ertz caught 11 passes and posted 104 receiving yards, but Washington lost three fumbles and an interception. Hurts passed for 246 yards and a touchdown, while the Eagles combined for seven rushing touchdowns. The Eagles' 55 points set the record for the most points in a conference championship game. With the win, they advanced to their fifth Super Bowl in franchise history and their second in three years.

==== Super Bowl LIX: vs. (A1) Kansas City Chiefs ====
Super Bowl LIX: (A1) Kansas City Chiefs vs. (N2) Philadelphia Eagles – Game summary

Quarter	1	2	3	4	Total
Chiefs	0	0	6	16	22
Eagles	7	17	10	6	40

at Caesars Superdome, New Orleans, Louisiana

- Date: February 9, 2025
- Game time: 6:40 p.m. EST/5:40 p.m. CST
- Game weather: None (indoor stadium)
- Game attendance: 65,719
- Referee: Ronald Torbert
- TV announcers (Fox): Kevin Burkhardt, Tom Brady, Erin Andrews and Tom Rinaldi
- Recap, Game Book

Game information

First quarter

- PHI – Jalen Hurts 1-yard run (Jake Elliott kick), 6:15. Eagles 7–0. Drive: 7 plays, 69 yards, 3:25.

Second quarter

- PHI – Jake Elliott 48-yard field goal, 8:38. Eagles 10–0. Drive: 7 plays, 27 yards, 3:59.
- PHI – Cooper DeJean 38-yard interception return (Jake Elliott kick), 7:03. Eagles 17–0.
- PHI – A. J. Brown 12-yard pass from Jalen Hurts (Jake Elliott kick), 1:35. Eagles 24–0. Drive: 2 plays, 14 yards, 0:10.

Third quarter

- PHI – Jake Elliott 29-yard field goal, 5:18. Eagles 27–0. Drive: 12 plays, 69 yards, 6:42.
- PHI – DeVonta Smith 46-yard pass from Jalen Hurts (Jake Elliott kick), 2:40. Eagles 34–0. Drive: 1 play, 46 yards, 0:07.
- KC – Xavier Worthy 24-yard pass from Patrick Mahomes (pass failed), 0:34. Eagles 34–6. Drive: 5 plays, 90 yards, 2:06.

Fourth quarter

- PHI – Jake Elliott 48-yard field goal, 9:51. Eagles 37–6. Drive: 10 plays, 40 yards, 5:43.
- PHI – Jake Elliott 50-yard field goal, 8:01. Eagles 40–6. Drive: 4 plays, 1 yard, 1:41.
- KC – DeAndre Hopkins 7-yard pass from Patrick Mahomes (Patrick Mahomes–Justin Watson pass), 2:54. Eagles 40–14. Drive: 12 plays, 75 yards, 5:07.
- KC – Xavier Worthy 50-yard pass from Patrick Mahomes (Patrick Mahomes–DeAndre Hopkins pass), 1:48. Eagles 40–22. Drive: 1 play, 50 yards, 0:08.

Top passers

- KC – Patrick Mahomes – 21/32, 257 yards, 3 TD, 2 INT
- PHI – Jalen Hurts – 17/22, 221 yards, 2 TD, INT

Top rushers

- KC – Patrick Mahomes – 4 rushes, 25 yards
- PHI – Jalen Hurts – 11 rushes, 72 yards, TD

Top receivers

- KC – Xavier Worthy – 8 receptions, 157 yards, 2 TD
- PHI – DeVonta Smith – 4 receptions, 69 yards, TD

Two years after their 38–35 defeat at the hands of the Kansas City Chiefs in Super Bowl LVII, the Eagles routed Kansas City 40–22 in a Super Bowl rematch. The Chiefs, led by head coach Andy Reid and quarterback Patrick Mahomes, were vying for an unprecedented third straight Super Bowl championship, and were in fact the first team ever to reach the Super Bowl with a chance for a three-peat.

The Eagles were forced to punt on their opening drive after a 32-yard completion to A. J. Brown was nullified by an offensive pass interference penalty. JuJu Smith-Schuster gained 11 yards on Kansas City's first offensive play, but it was to be the Chiefs' only first down until the third quarter. Jalen Hurts completed a 28-yard pass to Jahan Dotson on the Eagles ensuing drive just short of the endzone, then "tush pushed" the ball in on the next play for a 7–0 lead. After another Chiefs punt, Hurts took the Eagles back into Kansas City territory, but the drive ended on an interception to Bryan Cook – his first since Week 10, over half the entire NFL season ago. The Chiefs went three-and-out again and punted back to the Eagles. A 22-yard reception by Brown set up a Jake Elliott field goal. At this point, the onslaught by Philadelphia's top-ranked defense intensified. Mahomes was sacked on consecutive plays, then fired an interception to Eagles rookie cornerback Cooper DeJean, who returned the pick 38 yards for a touchdown and 17–0 advantage. After the teams traded punts, Mahomes, affected by pressure applied from defensive end Josh Sweat, tossed his second interception. The turnover, a diving catch by linebacker Zack Baun, set up Hurts' 12-yard touchdown pass to Brown, giving the Eagles a 24–0 halftime lead.

Kansas City's offense continued to struggle as the third quarter began, with sacks by Jordan Davis and Sweat forcing another punt. Hurts marched the Eagles on a 12-play field goal drive, which included two scrambles for first downs and a 22-yard downfield completion to Saquon Barkley. The Chiefs offense was then turned away again, with backup defensive back Avonte Maddox breaking up a fourth down pass to the outside intended for DeAndre Hopkins. Philadelphia took over on downs, and Jalen Hurts delivered a decisive 46-yard touchdown pass to DeVonta Smith on a play-action post pattern that extended the Eagles' lead to 34–0. Mahomes finally put the Chiefs on the board with a 24-yard touchdown pass to rookie speedster Xavier Worthy. Another Hurts scramble, this time for 17 yards, set up another Elliott field goal to make it 37–6 early in the fourth quarter. On Kansas City's next drive, defensive tackle Milton Williams strip-sacked Mahomes and recovered his own forced fumble, leading to Elliott's fourth field goal and a 40–6 lead. Mahomes would connect on garbage time touchdown passes to Hopkins and Worthy to complete the scoring.

The MVP award went to Hurts, who completed 17 of his 22 passes for 221 yards and two touchdowns. He broke the record for most rushing yards in a Super Bowl with 72, and he also scored one rushing touchdown. Barkley, the clear focus of Kansas City's defensive gameplan, had his least productive game of the season statistically (57 rushing yards), but he still eclipsed Terrell Davis' record for most rushing yards in a season including playoffs (finishing with a total of 2,504 yards). Philadelphia's defense amassed six sacks – Sweat leading the way with 2.5, and Williams adding two of his own. The win delivered the Eagles their second championship in a seven-year span. The dominance of the team's performance in the latter portion of the regular season and playoffs (going 16–1 overall after starting the season 2–2), has led to consideration of this iteration of the Eagles as the best in franchise history.
