= Oren Burks =

American football player (born 1995)

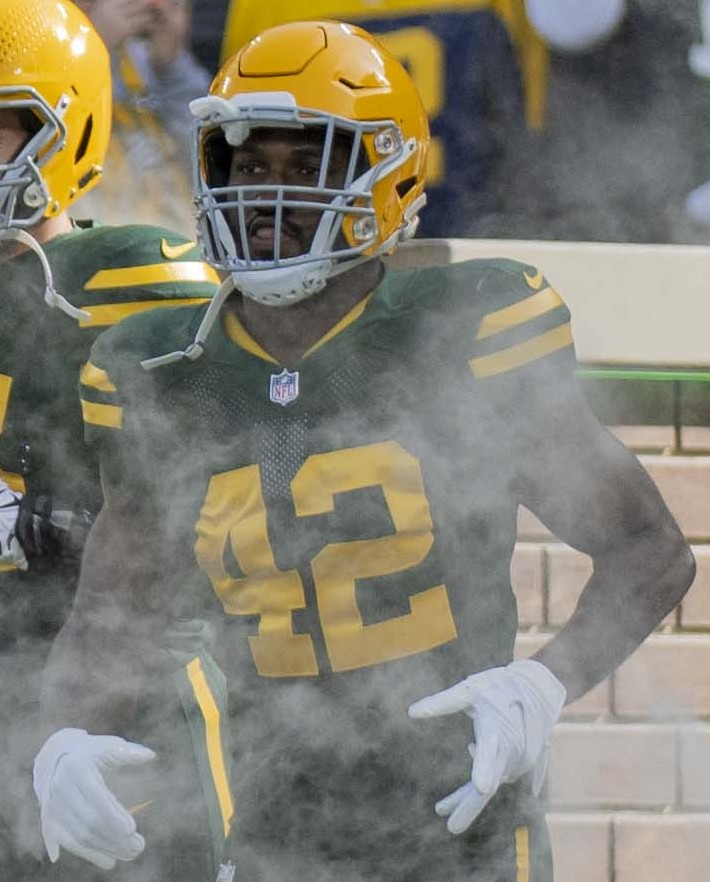
- Burks with the Green Bay Packers in 2021

No. 42 – Cincinnati Bengals
- Position: Linebacker
- Roster status: Injured reserve

Personal information
- Born: March 21, 1995 (age 31); Lorton, Virginia, U.S.
- Listed height: 6 ft 3 in (1.91 m)
- Listed weight: 233 lb (106 kg)

Career information
- High school: South County (Lorton)
- College: Vanderbilt (2013–2017)
- NFL draft: 2018: 3rd round, 88th overall pick

Career history
- Green Bay Packers (2018–2021); San Francisco 49ers (2022–2023); Philadelphia Eagles (2024); Cincinnati Bengals (2025–present)

Awards and highlights
- Super Bowl champion (LIX)

Career NFL statistics as of 2025
- Total tackles: 265
- Sacks: 2.0
- Forced fumbles: 5
- Fumble recoveries: 3
- Pass deflections: 4
- Interceptions: 1
- Stats at Pro Football Reference

Oren Spencer Burks (born March 21, 1995) is an American professional football linebacker for the Cincinnati Bengals of the National Football League (NFL). He played college football for the Vanderbilt Commodores and was selected by the Green Bay Packers in the third round of the 2018 NFL draft. He has also played for the San Francisco 49ers and Philadelphia Eagles. He is a one time Super Bowl champion.

== Early life ==
Burks attended South County High School in Lorton, Virginia. Rated as a 3-star prospect out of high school, Burks committed to Vanderbilt over other offers from Duke, Maryland, Boston College, and others.

== College career ==
In a game against Kentucky during his second year, Burks intercepted 2 passes, one of which was returned for a touchdown. This feat led to him being selected as the Southeastern Conference defensive player of the week. Following his senior season, Burks was also invited to play in the 2018 Senior Bowl as an alternate.

== Professional career ==
External videos
- Oren Burks' NFL Combine Workout
- Oren Burks runs the 40-yard dash

Pre-draft measurables
Height	Weight	Arm length	Hand span	Wingspan	40-yard dash	10-yard split	20-yard split	20-yard shuttle	Three-cone drill	Vertical jump	Broad jump	Bench press
6 ft 3 1/8 in (1.91 m)	233 lb (106 kg)	33 3/8 in (0.85 m)	9 1/8 in (0.23 m)	6 ft 7 1/2 in (2.02 m)	4.59 s	1.58 s	2.64 s	4.15 s	6.82 s	39.5 in (1.00 m)	10 ft 11 in (3.33 m)	18 reps
All values from NFL Combine

=== Green Bay Packers ===
The Green Bay Packers selected Burks in the third round (88th overall) of the 2018 NFL draft. The Packers traded their fourth (101st overall) and fifth round (147th overall) picks in 2018 to the Carolina Panthers in exchange for the Panthers' third round pick which they used to select Burks. Burks was the 12th linebacker drafted in 2018.

External videos
- Packers draft Oren Burks 88th overall
- NFL Draft Profile: Oren Burks

On May 17, 2018, the Packers signed Burks to a four-year, $3.43 million contract that included a signing bonus of $820,756.

Burks entered training camp slated as a backup inside linebacker. He competed against Antonio Morrison to be a starting inside linebacker after Jake Ryan sustained a torn ACL during training camp. Burks sustained a shoulder injury during pre-game warmups before the start of the Packers' third preseason game at the Oakland Raiders and was subsequently inactive for the first two regular season games (Weeks 1–2). Head coach Mike McCarthy named Burks a backup starting inside linebacker, behind Antonio Morrison, upon his return from injury. On September 23, 2018, Burks made his professional regular season debut and recorded two combined tackles during a 31–17 loss at the Washington Redskins in Week 3. As a rookie, he appeared in 14 games and made four starts. He had 24 total tackles (18 solo). In the 2019 season, he appeared in 12 games. He contributed on defense and special teams. In the 2020 season, he appeared in 16 games and mainly contributed on special teams while having 21 total tackles on defense. In the 2021 season, he appeared in all 17 games and made three starts. He had a half-sack and 36 total tackles (24 solo) while still contributing on special teams.

=== San Francisco 49ers ===
On March 17, 2022, Burks signed a two-year contract with the San Francisco 49ers. In the 2022 season, he appeared in 17 games and started three. He finished with a half-sack, 38 total tackles, and one pass defended. In the 2023 season, he appeared in 15 games and started three. He finished with one sack, 46 total tackles, one interception, and one pass defended. He was a starter in Super Bowl LVIII for the 49ers in their 25–22 overtime loss to the Chiefs.

=== Philadelphia Eagles ===
On March 19, 2024, Burks signed a one-year contract with the Philadelphia Eagles. He made his first start as an Eagle in Week 17 against the Dallas Cowboys in place of Nakobe Dean, who missed that game due to an abdomen injury; he recorded a forced fumble in the 41–7 win. He finished the 2024 season with 41 total tackles (20 solo) and one pass defended.

On January 12, 2025, during the Wild Card Playoff game against the Green Bay Packers, Burks recorded a forced fumble on the opening kickoff of the game. During that game he also took over the starting role in place of Nakobe Dean, who tore his patellar tendon during the game. In the game Burks recorded 4 tackles and 1 assist.

In the third quarter of the NFC Championship game against the Washington Commanders, Burks forced a fumble against Austin Ekeler. The Eagles would go on to win that game 55–23 and advance to Super Bowl LIX. In the Super Bowl, Burks recorded 5 tackles as the Eagles beat the Kansas City Chiefs, 40–22, and won the second Super Bowl in Eagles franchise history.

=== Cincinnati Bengals ===
On March 17, 2025, Burks signed a two-year deal with the Cincinnati Bengals. He finished the 2025 season with 48 total tackles (17 solo), one pass defended, one forced fumble, and one fumble recovery.

== NFL career statistics ==
Legend
	Won the Super Bowl
	Led the league
**Bold**	Career high

=== Regular season ===
Year	Team	Games		Tackles						Interceptions						Fumbles	
Year	Team	GP	GS	Cmb	Solo	Ast	Sck	TFL	Sfty	PD	Int	Yds	Avg	Lng	TD	FF	FR
2018	GB	14	4	24	18	6	0.0	0	0	0	0	0	0.0	0	0	0	0
2019	GB	12	0	11	7	4	0.0	0	0	0	0	0	0.0	0	0	0	0
2020	GB	16	0	21	14	7	0.0	1	0	0	0	0	0.0	0	0	**2**	0
2021	GB	17	3	36	24	12	0.5	1	0	0	0	0	0.0	0	0	0	**1**
2022	SF	17	3	38	15	23	0.5	1	0	**1**	0	0	0.0	0	0	0	0
2023	SF	15	5	46	**29**	17	**1.0**	**3**	0	**1**	**1**	**11**	**11.0**	**11**	0	0	**1**
2024	PHI	17	2	41	20	21	0.0	2	0	**1**	0	0	0.0	0	0	**2**	0
2025	CIN	17	9	**48**	17	**31**	0.0	1	0	**1**	0	0	0.0	0	0	1	**1**
Total		125	26	265	144	121	2.0	9	0	4	1	11	11.0	11	0	5	3

=== Postseason ===
Year	Team	Games		Tackles						Interceptions						Fumbles	
Year	Team	GP	GS	Cmb	Solo	Ast	Sck	TFL	Sfty	PD	Int	Yds	Avg	Lng	TD	FF	FR
2019	GB	2	0	6	2	4	0.0	0	0	0	0	0	0.0	0	0	0	0
2020	GB	2	0	3	2	1	0.0	0	0	0	0	0	0.0	0	0	0	0
2021	GB	1	0	2	1	1	0.0	0	0	0	0	0	0.0	0	0	0	0
2022	SF	3	0	3	3	0	0.0	0	0	0	0	0	0.0	0	0	0	0
2023	SF	3	1	8	5	3	0.0	0	0	0	0	0	0.0	0	0	0	0
2024	PHI	4	3	**25**	**16**	**9**	**1.0**	**3**	0	**1**	0	0	0.0	0	0	**2**	0
Total		15	4	47	29	18	1.0	3	0	1	0	0	0.0	0	0	2	0
