= Chris Naeole =

American football player and coach (born 1974)

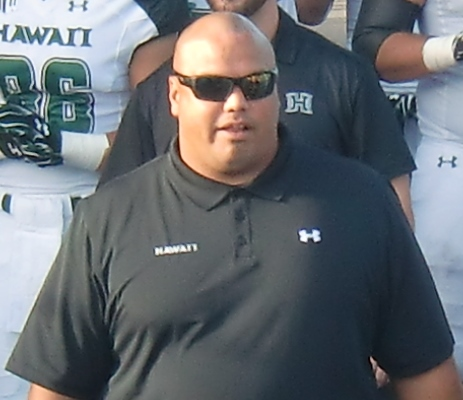
- Naeole in 2014

No. 65
- Position: Guard

Personal information
- Born: December 25, 1974 (age 51); Kailua, Hawaii, U.S.
- Listed height: 6 ft 3 in (1.91 m)
- Listed weight: 328 lb (149 kg)

Career information
- High school: Kahuku (Kahuku, Hawaii)
- College: Colorado
- NFL draft: 1997: 1st round, 10th overall pick

Career history

Playing
- New Orleans Saints (1997–2001); Jacksonville Jaguars (2002–2008)

Coaching
- ʻIolani (HI) HS (2010–2012) Defensive line coach; Hawaii (2013–2015) Offensive line coach; Hawaii (2015) Interim head coach; Hawaii (2015–2017) Offensive line coach

Awards and highlights
- Consensus All-American (1996); First-team All-Big 12 (1996); First-team All-Big Eight (1995); Second-team All-Big Eight (1994)

Career NFL statistics
- Games played: 154
- Games started: 150
- Fumble recoveries: 5
- Stats at Pro Football Reference

Head coaching record
- Regular season: 1–3 (.250) (College)

Christopher Kealoha Naeole ([nəeˈolɛ]; born December 25, 1974) is an American former professional football player who was an offensive guard in the National Football League (NFL). He played college football for the Colorado Buffaloes, earning All-American honors in 1996. He was selected 10th overall by the New Orleans Saints in the 1997 NFL draft. Naeole also played for the Jacksonville Jaguars. After his playing career, he became a high school football coach by 2010, later serving as the offensive line coach for the Hawaii Rainbow Warriors.

== Early life ==
Naeole was born in Kailua, Hawaii. He attended Kahuku High School in Kahuku, Hawaii, and earned two letters in football and one in wrestling. In football, he was a high school All-America first-team selection by Prep Football Report, and received second-team accolades from Blue Chip Report and an honorable mention from USA Today as a senior. As a two-way tackle, he made 56 tackles, five sacks, eight passes deflected, four forced fumbles and three fumble recoveries as a senior.

== College career ==
Naeole attended the University of Colorado-Boulder, where he was a three-year starter for the Colorado Buffaloes football team at right guard. In three seasons, he allowed only one sack. As a senior in 1996, he was recognized as a consensus first-team All-American and was an All-Big 12 Conference first-team selection. Naeole was the recipient of the John Mack Award, given to the team's Most Outstanding Offensive Player. He graduated from the university with a degree in sociology.

== Professional career ==
=== 1997 NFL Draft ===
Naeole was drafted tenth overall in the 1997 NFL draft by the New Orleans Saints. He was the highest selected guard since Eric Moore in 1988, and the first Colorado offensive lineman selected in the first round since Stan Brock was drafted by the Saints in 1980.

=== New Orleans Saints ===
On July 17, 1997, Naeole signed a five-year, $8 million deal with the New Orleans Saints, and soon afterwards bought a 4,000-square-foot house in Metairie, Louisiana. He played for the team through 2001, and was a starter throughout his time with the Saints.

=== Jacksonville Jaguars ===
Naeole was signed by the Jacksonville Jaguars as an unrestricted free agent in 2002. In Week 8 of the 2007 season he suffered a torn quadriceps tendon and was placed on injured reserve. Until this injury, Naeole had missed only one game in his 11 years as a pro, and had started 150 of 154 games in his pro career.

On March 3, 2008, Naeole was released by the Jaguars. He was re-signed on September 17 but did not play again. Naeole later indicated in 2010 that he had retired from professional football.

== Coaching career ==
Naeole was hired as an assistant football coach for ʻIolani School in Honolulu. He began his duties in the 2010 season. After three years with 'Iolani, Naeole was named the offensive line coach for the Hawaii Warriors. On November 1, 2015, Naeole was named Hawaii's interim head coach following the firing of Norm Chow and finished the season with a 1–3 record.

Naeole was retained as offensive line coach by new Hawaii head coach Nick Rolovich. On October 6, 2017, Naeole resigned, due to what he called "philosophical differences with the handling of disciplinary matters in the program."

=== Head coaching record ===
Year	Team	Overall	Conference	Standing	Bowl/playoffs
Hawaii Rainbow Warriors (Mountain West Conference) (2015)
2015	Hawaii	1–3 (Note: Served as interim head coach after Norm Chow was fired after the team's 58–7 loss to Air Force.)	0–3	6th (West)	
Hawaii:		1–3	0–3		
Total:		1–3			
National championship Conference title Conference division title or championship game berth

== Executive career ==
=== Philadelphia Eagles ===
As of 2024, Naeole is listed as an international scout for the Philadelphia Eagles on the team's front office roster page. Naeole was tasked with teaching football to undrafted free agent signing Laekin Vakalahi of New Zealand, who was learning to play on the offensive line after only being experienced in junior rugby.
