= Joe Kasper =

American football player and coach (born 1983)

Philadelphia Eagles
- Title: Defensive pass-game coordinator

Career information
- High school: Mentor (Mentor, Ohio)
- College: Baldwin Wallace

Career history

Coaching
- Mentor HS (OH) (2015–2016) Defensive backs coach; John Carroll (2017) Wide receivers coach; Duke (2018–2020) Graduate assistant; Philadelphia Eagles (2021–2022) Defensive quality control coach; Miami Dolphins (2023) Safeties coach; Philadelphia Eagles (2024–present); Safeties coach (2024-2025); Defensive pass-game coordinator (2026-present)

Operations
- Cleveland Browns (2013–2014) Player personnel and development assistant

Awards and highlights
- Super Bowl champion (LIX)

Joe Kasper is an American football coach who currently serves as the defensive backs coach and defensive pass-game coordinator for the Philadelphia Eagles of the National Football League (NFL).

== Coaching career ==
In 2017, Kasper coached at John Carroll University. Kasper originally joined the Philadelphia Eagles as a defensive quality control coach during the 2021 offseason after spending the previous three years (2018–20) at Duke University. After the Eagles' loss in Super Bowl LVII, the Dolphins hired Kasper as their new safeties coach, replacing Steve Gregory who was let go at the end of the season.

On February 2, 2024, Kasper came to terms with the Eagles to return as their safeties coach. Kasper was part of the coaching staff that won Super Bowl LIX over the Kansas City Chiefs.

On January 26, 2026, following the departure of Christian Parker, Kasper was promoted to serve as Philadelphia's defensive backs coach and defensive pass-game coordinator.
