= A. J. Woods =

American football player (born 2001)

Profile
- Position: Cornerback

Personal information
- Born: March 28, 2001 (age 25); Germantown, Maryland, U.S.
- Listed height: 5 ft 10 in (1.78 m)
- Listed weight: 186 lb (84 kg)

Career information
- High school: Northwest (Germantown, Maryland)
- College: Pittsburgh (2019–2023)
- NFL draft: 2024: undrafted

Career history
- Washington Commanders (2024)*; Philadelphia Eagles (2024)*; Denver Broncos (2025)*; Atlanta Falcons (2025)*; Buffalo Bills (2026)
- * Offseason or practice squad member only

Awards and highlights
- Super Bowl champion (LIX)

Career NFL statistics as of Week 9, 2026
- Games played: 1
- Stats at Pro Football Reference

Anthony "A. J." Woods Jr. (born March 28, 2001) is an American professional football cornerback. He played college football for the Pittsburgh Panthers and was signed by the Washington Commanders as an undrafted free agent in 2024.

== Early life ==
Woods was born in Germantown, Maryland on March 28, 2001. He attended Northwest High School in Germantown, where he was rated a 3-star recruit. Woods originally committed to James Madison in 2018, but switched his commitment to play for Pittsburgh.

== College career ==
In his five-year college career, Woods played in 59 games, recording 70 tackles, eight tackles for loss, two sacks, four interceptions, 25 pass breakups, and one forced fumble. After his senior season, he was selected to play in the East–West Shrine Bowl.

== Professional career ==
Pre-draft measurables
Height	Weight	Arm length	Hand span	Wingspan	40-yard dash	10-yard split	20-yard split	20-yard shuttle	Three-cone drill	Vertical jump	Broad jump	Bench press
5 ft 10 1/8 in (1.78 m)	187 lb (85 kg)	30 1/2 in (0.77 m)	8 1/2 in (0.22 m)	5 ft 11 5/8 in (1.82 m)	4.35 s	1.48 s	2.55 s	4.00 s	6.56 s	37.5 in (0.95 m)	10 ft 3 in (3.12 m)	16 reps
All values from Pro Day

=== Washington Commanders ===
After going undrafted in the 2024 NFL draft, Woods signed with the Washington Commanders as an undrafted free agent on April 27, 2024. Woods was released by the Commanders on August 27.

=== Philadelphia Eagles ===
On September 10, 2024, the Philadelphia Eagles signed Woods to their practice squad. He won a Super Bowl championship when the Eagles defeated the Kansas City Chiefs 40–22 in Super Bowl LIX. He signed a reserve/future contract on February 14, 2025.

On August 26, 2025, Woods was waived by the Eagles as part of final roster cuts.

=== Denver Broncos ===
On September 24, 2025, Woods was signed to the Denver Broncos practice squad. He was released on October 18.

=== Atlanta Falcons ===
On October 28, 2025, Woods signed with the Atlanta Falcons' practice squad. He signed a reserve/future contract with Atlanta on January 5, 2026.

On August 30, 2026, Woods was waived by the Falcons as a part of final roster cuts.

=== Buffalo Bills ===
On October 6, 2026, Woods signed with the Buffalo Bills practice squad. He was waived on October 19. On October 27, he was re-signed to the practice squad. On November 11, Woods was released.
