= Christian Parker (American football) =

American football coach (born 1991)

Dallas Cowboys
- Title: Defensive coordinator

Personal information
- Born: December 23, 1991 (age 34); Flemington, New Jersey, U.S.
- Listed height: 5 ft 10 in (1.78 m)
- Listed weight: 185 lb (84 kg)

Career information
- Positions: Wide receiver, cornerback
- High school: Battlefield (VA)
- College: Richmond (2009–2012)

Career history
- Virginia State (2013–2014) Defensive backs coach; Norfolk State (2015–2016) Defensive backs coach; Notre Dame (2017) Defensive analyst; Texas A&M (2018) Defensive analyst; Green Bay Packers (2019–2020) Defensive quality control coach; Denver Broncos (2021–2023) Defensive backs coach; Philadelphia Eagles (2024–2025) Passing game coordinator & defensive backs coach; Dallas Cowboys (2026–present) Defensive coordinator

Awards and highlights
- Super Bowl champion (LIX)
- Coaching profile at Pro Football Reference

Christian Parker (born December 23, 1991) is an American football coach who is the defensive coordinator for the Dallas Cowboys of the National Football League (NFL). He was previously a defensive quality control coach for the Green Bay Packers, defensive backs coach for the Denver Broncos and Philadelphia Eagles, and also spent time as an analyst at Texas A&M and Notre Dame.

== Coaching career ==
=== Early career ===
Parker got his start in coaching working as the cornerbacks coach at Virginia State in 2013, later shifting to coach all defensive backs the following year. He also spent time at Norfolk State as both their safeties and cornerbacks coach as well as assistant recruiting coordinator from 2015 to 2016.

Parker was hired to coach the cornerbacks at William & Mary in 2017, but left to accept a position at Notre Dame. He was hired as a defensive analyst at Texas A&M the following year on Jimbo Fisher's inaugural staff.

=== Green Bay Packers ===
Parker was hired as a defensive quality control coach for the Green Bay Packers in 2019. While with Green Bay, he assisted defensive coordinator Mike Pettine in breaking down film on opponents and coordinating the scout team.

=== Denver Broncos ===
Parker was named the defensive backs coach for the Denver Broncos on February 8, 2021. He coached Patrick Surtain II and Justin Simmons during his time in Denver, with both receiving All-Pro honors during his tenure.

=== Philadelphia Eagles ===
On February 5, 2024, it was announced that Parker was named the passing game coordinator and defensive backs coach for the Philadelphia Eagles. Parker joined newly hired defensive coordinator Vic Fangio in Philadelphia. Parker coached under then-Broncos head coach Fangio in Denver in 2021. He was part of the coaching staff that won Super Bowl LIX over the Kansas City Chiefs. Parker coached Quinyon Mitchell and Cooper DeJean in Philadelphia, with both receiving first-team All-Pro honors in 2025.

=== Dallas Cowboys ===
On January 22, 2026, the Dallas Cowboys hired Parker as their new defensive coordinator under head coach Brian Schottenheimer.

During the first ten games, the defense struggled as it ranked last in total yards and run defense. After giving up 584 yards during a Week 10 46–40 loss to the San Francisco 49ers, Parker lost play-calling duties to Pettine, who was the team's senior defensive assistant. Parker remained on the staff as the coordinator.

== Personal life ==
Parker is a graduate of Battlefield High School in Prince William County, Virginia.
