= Laekin Vakalahi =

Australian football player (born 2003)

No. 78 – Los Angeles Chargers
- Position: Offensive tackle
- Roster status: Practice squad

Personal information
- Born: 28 January 2003 (age 23); Auckland, New Zealand
- Listed height: 6 ft 5 in (1.96 m)
- Listed weight: 327 lb (148 kg)

Career information
- NFL draft: 2024: undrafted

Career history
- Philadelphia Eagles (2024-2025)*; Los Angeles Chargers (2026–present)*
- * Offseason or practice squad member only

Awards and highlights
- Super Bowl champion (LIX)
- Stats at Pro Football Reference

Laekin Vakalahi (born 28 January 2003) is a New Zealand-Australian professional American football offensive tackle for the Los Angeles Chargers of the National Football League (NFL) and former rugby league player.

== Early life ==
Vakalahi was born in Auckland, New Zealand and played junior rugby league in Brisbane for the Ormeau Shearers. He later moved to Melbourne where he played basketball. After a chance encounter in Hawaii with his family and Bill Carey, a friend of Philadelphia Eagles international scout Chris Naeole who was impressed by his 35-inch arms 83–inch wingspan. He was given an official try-out and he began to train at Conquest Athletic Performance in Australia, previously used by Baltimore Ravens' Daniel Faalele.

== American football career ==
=== Philadelphia Eagles ===
After completing a six-week training camp, Vakalahi was signed as an undrafted free agent by the Philadelphia Eagles in May 2024 on a three-year international development contract. In pre-season in 2024 he played left tackle. He won a Super Bowl championship when the Eagles defeated the Kansas City Chiefs 40–22 in Super Bowl LIX.

Vakalahi signed a reserve/future contract with Philadelphia on February 14, 2025. He was waived by the Eagles on August 26 as a part of the team's final roster cuts.

=== Los Angeles Chargers ===
On May 12, 2026, Vakalahi was signed by the Los Angeles Chargers. Vakalahi was waived by Los Angeles as a part of final roster cuts on August 30; he was re-signed to the team's practice squad the following day.

== Personal life ==
Vakalahi's parents are Frank and Mary Vakalahi. He has four siblings, including a younger brother Kobe Vakalahi. A member of The Church of Jesus Christ of Latter-day Saints, he spent two years completing his mission service in Wellington, New Zealand prior to 2024. He is a citizen of New Zealand.
