= Quinyon Mitchell =

American football player (born 2001)

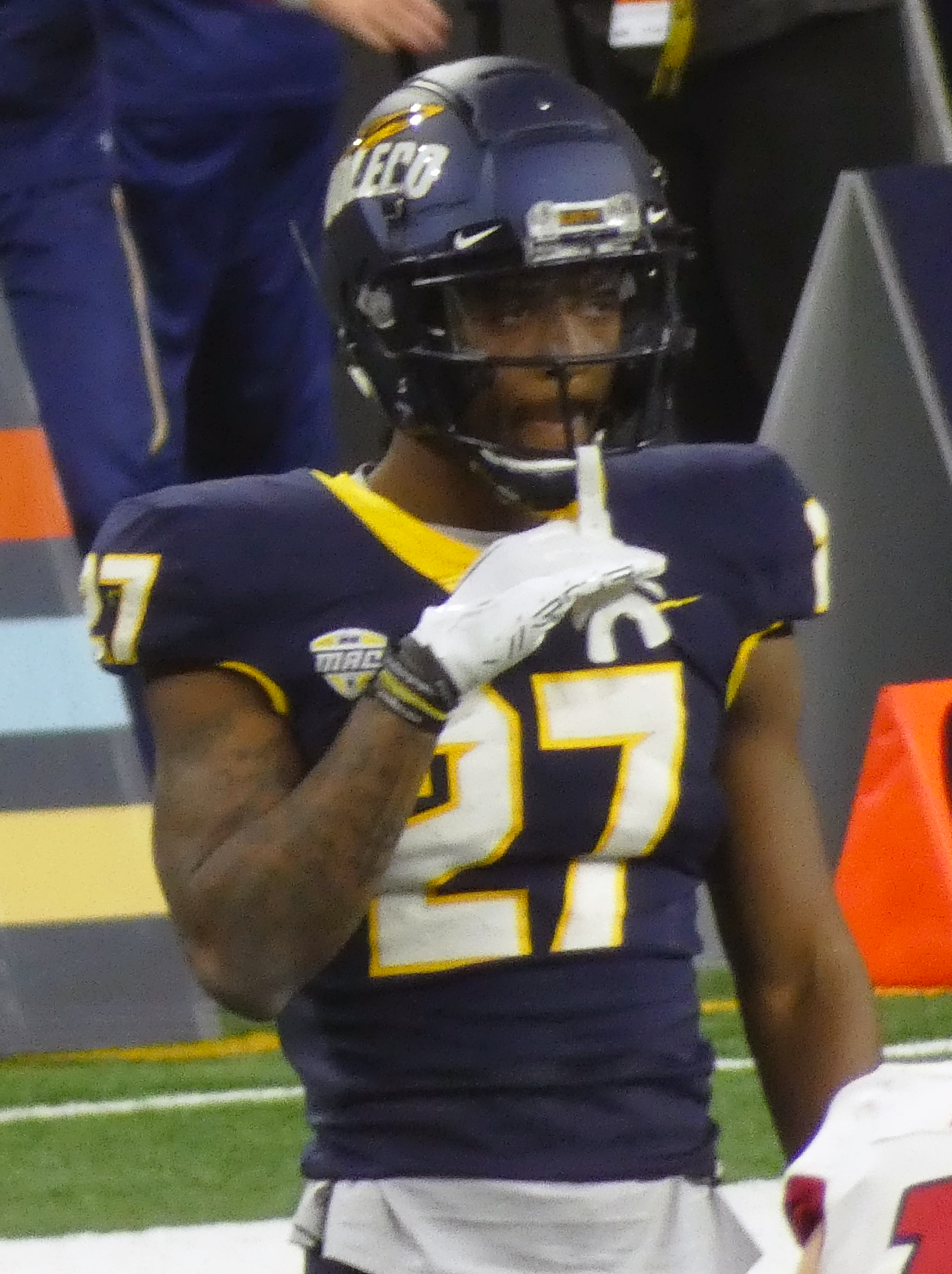
- Mitchell with the Toledo Rockets in 2023

No. 27 – Philadelphia Eagles
- Position: Cornerback
- Roster status: Active

Personal information
- Born: July 18, 2001 (age 25); Williston, Florida, U.S.
- Listed height: 6 ft 0 in (1.83 m)
- Listed weight: 193 lb (88 kg)

Career information
- High school: Williston
- College: Toledo (2020–2023)
- NFL draft: 2024: 1st round, 22nd overall pick

Career history
- Philadelphia Eagles (2024–present)

Awards and highlights
- Super Bowl champion (LIX); First-team All-Pro (2025); Pro Bowl (2025); PFWA All-Rookie Team (2024); 2× First-team All-MAC (2022, 2023)

Career NFL statistics as of Week 9, 2026
- Total tackles: 131
- Fumble recoveries: 1
- Pass deflections: 38
- Interceptions: 1
- Stats at Pro Football Reference

Quinyon Keaaron Mitchell (born July 18, 2001) is an American professional football cornerback for the Philadelphia Eagles of the National Football League (NFL). Mitchell played college football for the Toledo Rockets, where he was a two-time all-conference selection. Mitchell was selected 22nd overall by the Eagles in the first round of the 2024 NFL draft.

== Early life ==
Mitchell was born on July 18, 2001, in Williston, Florida. He attended Williston High School in his hometown and played football, basketball, and ran track. He won three letters at Williston and in football totaled 86 tackles, 19 pass deflections and eight interceptions in his career; he also played on offense and recorded 983 rushing yards and 11 touchdowns with a 9.5 yards-per-carry average as a senior in 2019. Ranked a three-star recruit, he committed to play college football for the Toledo Rockets.

== College career ==
Mitchell played all six games as a true freshman during the COVID-19-shortened 2020 season, totaling seven tackles. He then started all 13 games in 2021 at cornerback, totaling 34 tackles, eight pass breakups, one forced fumble and one fumble recovery, along with a sack.

Mitchell remained a full-time starter in 2022, starting all 14 games while posting 41 tackles, 25 passes defended (which led the country), five interceptions, and 3.5 TFLs.In 2022, Mitchell became the only FBS player since 2000 to record four interceptions and two pick-sixes in the same game, doing so against Northern Illinois. Mitchell was named the national defensive player of the week after recording four interceptions and two pick sixes in a win over Northern Illinois; his four interceptions tied the school record. Mitchell was selected first-team All-Mid-American Conference (MAC) and was a second-team All-America honoree by the Walter Camp Foundation.

In 13 games during the 2023 season, Mitchell compiled 41 total tackles, 18 passes defended, and one interception. Mitchell was named a semifinalist for the Chuck Bednarik Award, being Toledo's first player to earn the honor, and was chosen a first-team All-American, being the second back-to-back All-American in school history. Following the conclusion of the season, Mitchell was invited to the 2024 Senior Bowl.

== Professional career ==
Pre-draft measurables
Height	Weight	Arm length	Hand span	Wingspan	40-yard dash	10-yard split	20-yard split	Vertical jump	Broad jump	Bench press
6 ft 0 1/8 in (1.83 m)	195 lb (88 kg)	31 in (0.79 m)	9 1/4 in (0.23 m)	6 ft 3 3/4 in (1.92 m)	4.33 s	1.51 s	2.53 s	38.0 in (0.97 m)	10 ft 2 in (3.10 m)	20 reps
All values from NFL Combine

Mitchell was selected by the Philadelphia Eagles in the first round (22nd overall) of the 2024 NFL draft. His jersey number was initially assigned to No. 30, but switched to No. 27 ahead of the regular season following the departure of Zech McPhearson.

=== 2024 season ===
During his rookie year, Mitchell was known for his consistent coverage skills against veteran receivers such as Drake London, Ja'Marr Chase, and Mike Evans. Most notably, during the week 11 Thursday Night Football matchup against the Washington Commanders, Mitchell held wide receiver Terry McLaurin to 0 targets, 0 receptions, and 0 yards. Due to his efficiency against guarding wide receivers, Mitchell was nicknamed "Quinyonamo Bay"; a reference to the United States military prison Guantanamo Bay, and his colloquial status as a "lockdown corner". He was named to the PFWA All-Rookie Team for his 2024 season. Mitchell would record his first career interception in the 22–10 win over the Green Bay Packers in the wild-card round of the 2024 NFL playoffs. In the 2024 NFC Championship game, Mitchell intercepted quarterback Jayden Daniels enroute to a blowout win 55–23. Mitchell became a Super Bowl champion following the Eagles 40–22 win over the Chiefs in Super Bowl LIX.

Mitchell finished in second-place for the AP NFL Defensive Rookie of the Year award. He was ranked 49th by his fellow players on the NFL Top 100 Players of 2025.

=== 2025 season ===
In his sophomore year, Mitchell became the No. 1 cornerback in the Eagles’ depth chart entering the first week of the regular season. In Week 4, Mitchell recorded five pass breakups and five tackles while only allowing two catches for six yards during a 31–25 victory over the Tampa Bay Buccaneers, earning NFC Defensive Player of the Week honors. Mitchell finished the season 1st among NFL cornerbacks in catch rate allowed (41.6%), 3rd in forced incompletions (12), and 1st in touchdowns allowed (0). Mitchell’s performance in 2025 earned him Pro Bowl and First-team All-Pro honors, cementing his status among the NFL’s elite cornerbacks. Mitchell recorded two interceptions in the 23–19 loss to the San Francisco 49ers in the Wild Card Round.

=== 2026 season ===
In Week 6 against the Jacksonville Jaguars in London during the third quarter, he recorded his first career interception in the regular season off Trevor Lawrence in the 19–17 loss.

== Career statistics ==
Legend
	Won the Super Bowl
	Led the league
**Bold**	Career high

=== NFL ===
==== Regular season ====
Year	Team	Games		Tackles					Interceptions						Fumbles			
Year	Team	GP	GS	Comb	Solo	Ast	Sck	TFL	PD	Int	Yds	Avg	Lng	TD	FF	FR	Yds	TD
2024	PHI	16	16	**46**	**37**	9	0.0	0	12	0	0	0.0	0	0	0	0	0	0
2025	PHI	16	16	45	35	**10**	0.0	0	**17**	0	0	0.0	0	0	0	**1**	**6**	0
2026	PHI	9	9	40	31	9	0.0	2	9	1	0	0.0	0	0	0	0	0	0
Career		41	41	91	72	19	0.0	2	38	1	0	0.0	0	0	0	1	6	0

==== Postseason ====
Year	Team	Games		Tackles					Interceptions						Fumbles			
Year	Team	GP	GS	Comb	Solo	Ast	Sck	TFL	PD	Int	Yds	Avg	Lng	TD	FF	FR	Yds	TD
2024	PHI	4	4	**14**	**12**	**2**	0.0	0	**4**	**2**	0	0.0	0	0	0	0	0	0
2025	PHI	1	1	3	2	1	0.0	0	3	**2**	**3**	**1.5**	**3**	0	**1**	0	0	0
Career		5	5	17	14	3	0.0	0	7	4	3	0.8	3	0	1	0	0	0

=== College ===
Year	Team	GP	Tackles					Interceptions					Fumbles			
Year	Team	GP	Comb	Solo	Ast	Sck	TFL	Int	Yds	Avg	TD	PD	FF	FR	Yds	TD
2020	Toledo	6	7	6	1	0.0	0.0	0	0	—	0	0	0	0	0	0
2021	Toledo	13	34	28	6	**1.0**	2.0	0	0	—	0	8	**1**	**1**	0	0
2022	Toledo	14	**41**	27	**14**	0.0	**3.5**	**5**	**51**	**10.2**	**2**	**19**	0	0	0	0
2023	Toledo	13	**41**	**32**	9	0.0	2.0	1	3	3.0	0	18	0	0	0	0
Career		46	123	93	30	1.0	7.5	6	54	9.0	2	45	1	1	0	0
