= 2025 Philadelphia Eagles season =

93rd season in franchise history

- Owner: Jeffrey Lurie
- General manager: Howie Roseman
- Head coach: Nick Sirianni
- Offensive coordinator: Kevin Patullo
- Defensive coordinator: Vic Fangio
- Home stadium: Lincoln Financial Field

Results
- Record: 11–6
- Division place: 1st NFC East
- Playoffs: Lost Wild Card Playoffs (vs. 49ers) 19–23
- All-Pros: CB Cooper DeJean (1st team) (Note: Selected as a slot cornerback); CB Quinyon Mitchell (1st team)
- Pro Bowlers: 6: ILB Zack Baun; DT Jalen Carter; CB Cooper DeJean; C Cam Jurgens; CB Quinyon Mitchell; QB Jalen Hurts

Uniform
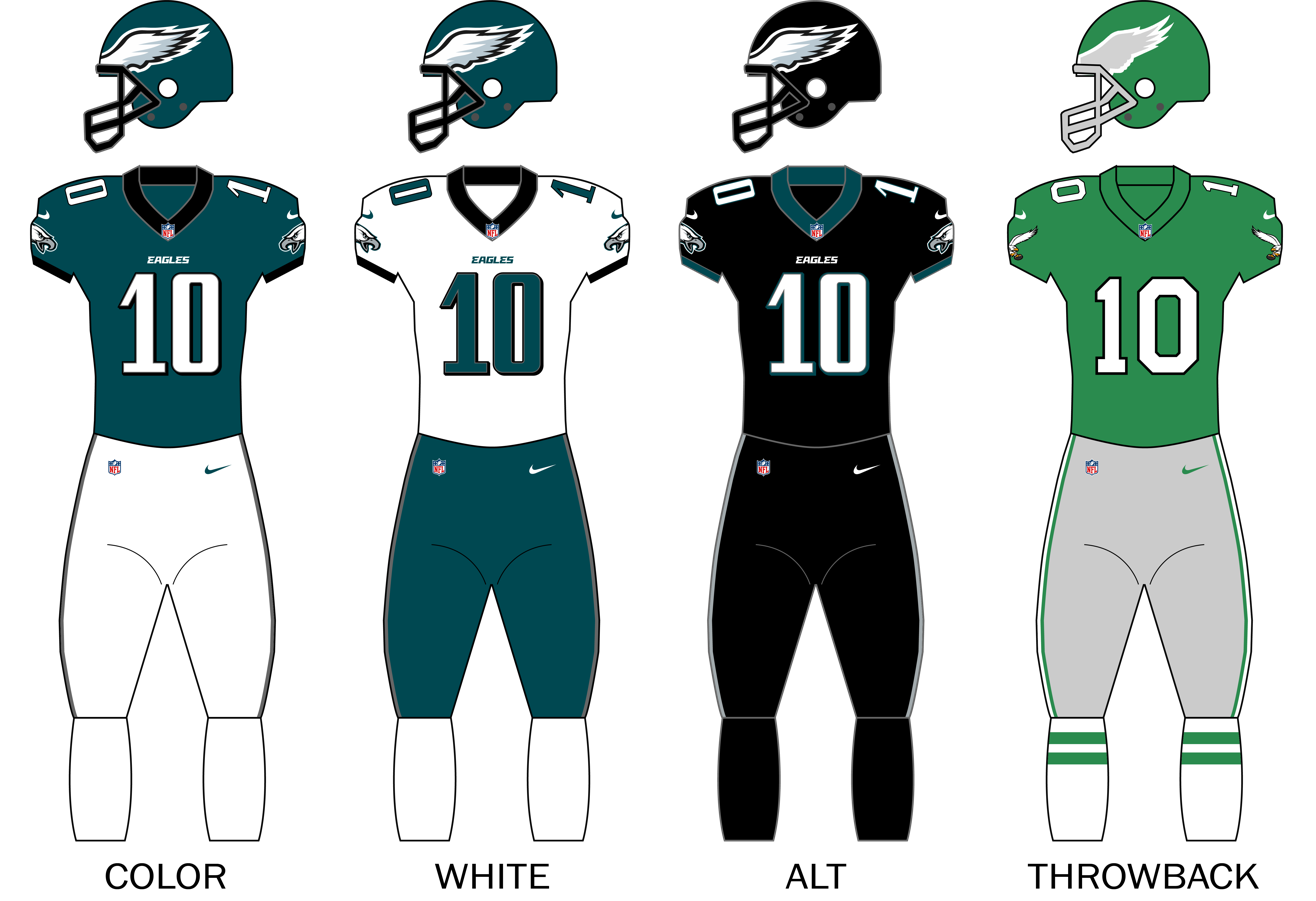

The 2025 season was the Philadelphia Eagles' 93rd in the National Football League (NFL) and their fifth under head coach Nick Sirianni. The Eagles entered the season as the defending Super Bowl champions.

The season marked the team’s fourth consecutive year with a new offensive coordinator, as Kellen Moore departed to become head coach of the New Orleans Saints. After an 8–2 start, the Eagles lost their next three games, preventing them from improving on their 14–3 record from the previous season. A shutout victory over the Las Vegas Raiders secured the Eagles their fifth consecutive winning season. The following week, a win over their division rival Washington Commanders clinched the NFC East title, making them the first NFC East team to repeat as division champions since the 2004 Eagles.

In the playoffs, the Eagles lost to the San Francisco 49ers in the Wild Card round by a final score 23–19, ending their hopes to repeat as Super Bowl champions.

The Philadelphia Eagles drew an average home attendance of 69,879, the 15th-highest of all NFL teams.

== NFL Top 100 ==
The Eagles have nine players ranked in the NFL Top 100 Players of 2025.

| Rank | Player | Position | Change |
|---|---|---|---|
| 1 | Saquon Barkley | RB | ▲85 |
| 19 | Jalen Hurts | QB | ▼4 |
| 23 | Lane Johnson | OT | ▲18 |
| 26 | Zack Baun | ILB | NR |
| 29 | A. J. Brown | WR | ▼8 |
| 43 | Jalen Carter | DT | NR |
| 49 | Quinyon Mitchell | CB | NR |
| 60 | Cooper DeJean | CB | NR |
| 69 | Jordan Mailata | OT | NR |

The following player was ranked in the NFL Top 100 Players of 2025 based on his performance with the Philadelphia Eagles in 2024 but is no longer on the team following the release of the list.

| Rank | Player | Position | Change |
|---|---|---|---|
| 95 | Josh Sweat | DE | NR |

== Offseason ==
=== Coaching changes ===
2025 Philadelphia Eagles coaching staff changes
| Position | Previous coach(es) | Vacancy reason | Replacement(s) | Source(s) |
|---|---|---|---|---|
| Offensive coordinator | Kellen Moore, 2024 | Hired by New Orleans | Kevin Patullo | |
| Passing game coordinator | Kevin Patullo, 2021–2024 | Promoted to offensive coordinator | Parks Frazier | |
| Quarterbacks coach | Doug Nussmeier, 2024 | Hired by New Orleans | Scot Loeffler | |
| Assistant offensive line | T. J. Paganetti, 2024 | Hired by New Orleans | Greg Austin | |
| Offensive assistant | Kyle Valero, 2024 | Hired by New Orleans | Montgomery VanGorder | |
| Assistant to the head coach | N/A | | Cole Peterson | |

=== Futures contracts ===
| Position | Player | Date signed |
|---|---|---|
| TE | Cameron Latu | January 21 |
| CB | Tariq Castro-Fields | February 15 |
| WR | Elijah Cooks | February 15 |
| RB | Tyrion Davis-Price | February 15 |
| LB | Dallas Gant | February 15 |
| WR | Danny Gray | February 15 |
| DT | Gabe Hall | February 15 |
| DE | KJ Henry | February 15 |
| LB | Ochaun Mathis | February 15 |
| TE | Nick Muse | February 15 |
| CB | Parry Nickerson | February 15 |
| S | Andre' Sam | February 15 |
| OT | Laekin Vakalahi | February 15 |
| CB | A. J. Woods | February 15 |

=== Free agents ===
Below are players whose contracts with the team expired after the 2024 season.

| Position | Player | Tag | 2025 team | Notes |
|---|---|---|---|---|
| LB | Zack Baun | UFA | Philadelphia Eagles | 3 years, $51 million |
| T | Mekhi Becton | UFA | Los Angeles Chargers | 2 years, $20 million |
| LB | Oren Burks | UFA | Cincinnati Bengals | 2 years, $5 million |
| WR | Parris Campbell | UFA | Dallas Cowboys | 1 year |
| T | Le'Raven Clark | UFA | TBD | |
| WR | Britain Covey | UFA | Los Angeles Rams | 1 year |
| T | Jack Driscoll | UFA | Pittsburgh Steelers | PS |
| RB | Kenneth Gainwell | UFA | Pittsburgh Steelers | 1 year, $1.79 million |
| T | Fred Johnson | UFA | Jacksonville Jaguars | 1 year, $1.17 million |
| LS | Rick Lovato | UFA | Los Angeles Chargers | PS |
| CB | Avonte Maddox | UFA | Detroit Lions | 1 year |
| CB | Isaiah Rodgers | UFA | Minnesota Vikings | 2 years, $15 million |
| DE | Josh Sweat | UFA | Arizona Cardinals | 4 years, $76.4 million |
| TE | C. J. Uzomah | UFA | TBD | |
| FB | Ben VanSumeren | ERFA | Philadelphia Eagles | 1 year, $1.03 million |
| DT | Milton Williams | UFA | New England Patriots | 4 years, $104 million |

=== Signings ===
| Position | Player | Tag | 2024 team | Date signed | Notes |
|---|---|---|---|---|---|
| RB | Lew Nichols III | UFA | Philadelphia Eagles | February 25 | 1 year, $840k |
| TE | Harrison Bryant | UFA | Las Vegas Raiders | March 13 | 1 year, $1.2 million |
| RB | AJ Dillon | UFA | Green Bay Packers | March 13 | 1 year, $1.34 million |
| LB | Joshua Uche | UFA | Kansas City Chiefs | March 13 | 1 year, $1.92 million |
| LS | Charley Hughlett | UFA | Cleveland Browns | March 14 | 1 year, $1.42 million |
| CB | Adoree' Jackson | UFA | New York Giants | March 14 | 1 year, $1.75 million |
| LB | Patrick Johnson | UFA | New York Giants | March 14 | 1 year |
| RB | Avery Williams | UFA | Atlanta Falcons | March 15 | 1 year, $1.27 million |
| TE | Kylen Granson | UFA | Indianapolis Colts | March 17 | 1 year, $1.75 million |
| LB | Azeez Ojulari | UFA | New York Giants | March 17 | 1 year, $3.5 million |
| T | Kendall Lamm | UFA | Miami Dolphins | March 25 | 1 year, $1.51 million |
| T | Matt Pryor | UFA | Chicago Bears | March 28 | 1 year, $1.36 million |
| WR | Terrace Marshall Jr. | UFA | Las Vegas Raiders | April 11 | 1 year |
| RB | Keilan Robinson | WVR | Jacksonville Jaguars | June 6 | 1 year |
| DE | Ogbo Okoronkwo | UFA | Cleveland Browns | July 22 | 1 year |
| DT | Jacob Sykes | UFA | San Antonio Brahmas | July 22 | 1 year |

=== Extensions and restructures ===
Below are players who are under contract through 2025 and received a contract extension.

| Position | Player | Date signed | Notes |
|---|---|---|---|
| RB | Saquon Barkley | March 4 | 2 years, $41.2 million |
| T | Lane Johnson | March 17 | 1 year |
| C | Cam Jurgens | April 21 | 4 years, $68 million |
| DT | Jordan Davis | April 30 | 1 year, $12.9 million* |
| TE | Dallas Goedert | May 7 | Restructure |

* Fifth-year option

=== Releases ===
| Position | Player | 2025 team | Release Date |
|---|---|---|---|
| C | Nick Gates | TBD | February 18 |
| CB | James Bradberry | TBD | March 12 |
| CB | Darius Slay | Pittsburgh Steelers | March 12 |
| RB | Tyrion Davis-Price | Tennessee Titans | May 4 |
| WR | Ife Adeyi | Philadelphia Eagles | June 6 |
| DE | KJ Henry | Cleveland Browns | July 22 |
| RB | Lew Nichols III | Pittsburgh Steelers | |
| G | Marcus Tate | TBD | August 1 |
| WR | Danny Gray | TBD | August 2 |
| CB | B. J. Mayes | TBD | August 3 |

=== Retirements ===
| Position | Player | Date Retired | Years with the Eagles | Years in the NFL |
|---|---|---|---|---|
| DE | Brandon Graham | March 18 | 15 | |

=== Trades ===
Trades below only are for trades that included a player. Draft pick-only trades will go in draft section.

| Date | Player(s)/Asset(s) received | Team | Player(s)/Asset(s) traded | Source |
|---|---|---|---|---|
| March 12 | QB Dorian Thompson-Robinson, 2025 5th round selection | Cleveland Browns | QB Kenny Pickett | |
| March 12 | G Kenyon Green, 2026 5th round selection | Houston Texans | S C. J. Gardner-Johnson, 2026 6th round selection | |
| June 2 | 2026 conditional selection | San Francisco 49ers | DE Bryce Huff | |
| August 5 | CB Jakorian Bennett | Las Vegas Raiders | DT Thomas Booker | |

== Draft ==
2025 Philadelphia Eagles draft selections
| Round | Selection | Player | Position | College | Notes |
|---|---|---|---|---|---|
| 1 | 31 | Jihaad Campbell | LB | Alabama | From Chiefs (Note: The Eagles traded first- and fifth-round selections (32nd and 164th overall) to the Kansas City Chiefs in exchange for a first-round selection (31st overall).) |
| 1 | 32 | Traded to the Kansas City Chiefs | | | |
| 2 | 64 | Andrew Mukuba | S | Texas | |
| 3 | 79 | Traded to the Washington Commanders (Note: The Eagles traded a conditional third-round selection and two seventh-round selections (79th, 236th and 248th overall) to the Washington Commanders in exchange for a fifth-round selection (165th overall) and WR Jahan Dotson. The condition – that Washington would receive the higher of Miami or Philadelphia's third-round selections – was converted on December 8, 2024, when the Eagles clinched a playoff spot, ensuring the Dolphins' pick was higher than the Eagles' own.) | | | From Dolphins (Note: The Eagles traded a 2024 fourth-round selection (120th overall) to the Miami Dolphins in exchange for a third-round selection (79th overall).) |
| 3 | 96 | Traded to the Atlanta Falcons (Note: The Eagles traded a third-round selection (96th overall) to the Atlanta Falcons in exchange for a third-round selection (101st overall) and a 2026 fifth-round selection.) | | | |
| 3 | 101 | Traded to the Denver Broncos (Note: The Eagles traded third- and fourth-round selections (101st and 134th overall) to the Denver Broncos in exchange for two third-round selections and a sixth-round selection (111th, 130th and 191st overall).) | | | From Rams via Falcons |
| 4 | 111 | Ty Robinson | DT | Nebraska | From Panthers via Broncos |
| 4 | 130 | Traded to the New York Jets (Note: The Eagles traded a fourth-round selection (130th overall) to the New York Jets in exchange for fifth- and sixth-round selections (145th and 207th overall).) | | | From Lions via Broncos |
| 4 | 134 | Traded to the Denver Broncos | | | From Eagles via Lions (Note: The Eagles traded a fourth-round selection (134th overall) and a 2023 seventh-round selection to the Detroit Lions in exchange for a 2023 seventh-round selection and RB D'Andre Swift.) (Note: The Eagles traded 2024 fourth- and sixth-round selections (132nd and 210th overall) to the Detroit Lions in exchange for a fourth-round selection (130th overall), and 2024 fifth- and sixth-round selections (164th and 201st overall).) |
| 5 | 145 | Mac McWilliams | CB | UCF | From Jets |
| 5 | 161 | Smael Mondon Jr. | LB | Georgia | From Texans (Note: The Eagles traded a 2024 fourth-round selection (123rd overall) to the Houston Texans in exchange for a fifth-round selection (161st overall) and a 2024 fourth-round selection (127th overall).) |
| 5 | 164 | Traded to the Kansas City Chiefs | | | From Lions via Browns (Note: The Eagles traded QB Kenny Pickett to the Cleveland Browns in exchange for a fifth-round selection (164th overall) and QB Dorian Thompson-Robinson.) |
| 5 | 165 | Traded to the Los Angeles Chargers (Note: The Eagles traded a fifth-round selection (165th overall) to the Los Angeles Chargers in exchange for two sixth-round selections (181st and 209th overall).) | | | From Commanders |
| 5 | 168 | Drew Kendall | C | Boston College | |
| 6 | 181 | Kyle McCord | QB | Syracuse | From Patriots via Chargers |
| 6 | 191 | Myles Hinton | OT | Michigan | From Cardinals via Broncos |
| 6 | 207 | Cameron Williams | OT | Texas | From Chiefs via Jets |
| 6 | 208 | Traded to the Denver Broncos (Note: The Eagles traded a sixth-round selection (208th overall) to the Denver Broncos in exchange for a seventh-round selection (236th overall) and TE Albert Okwuegbunam.) | | | |
| 6 | 209 | Antwaun Powell-Ryland | DE | Virginia Tech | Compensatory selection; from Chargers |
| 7 | 223 | Traded to the Pittsburgh Steelers (Note: The Eagles traded two seventh-round selections (223rd and 229th overall) and a 2024 third-round selection to the Pittsburgh Steelers in exchange for a 2024 fourth-round selection and QB Kenny Pickett.) | | | From Saints (Note: The Eagles traded a 2023 fifth-round selection and a 2024 sixth-round selection to the New Orleans Saints in exchange for a seventh-round selection (223rd overall) and S C. J. Gardner-Johnson.) |
| 7 | 229 | Traded to the Pittsburgh Steelers | | | From Falcons (Note: The Eagles traded DE Kentavius Street to the Atlanta Falcons in exchange for a seventh-round selection (229th overall).) |
| 7 | 236 | Traded to the Washington Commanders | | | From Broncos |
| 7 | 248 | Traded to the Washington Commanders | | | |

Draft trades

=== Undrafted free agents ===
2025 Philadelphia Eagles undrafted free agents
| Name | Position | College |
|---|---|---|
| Ife Adeyi | WR | Sam Houston |
| Darius Cooper | WR | Tarleton State |
| Lance Dixon | LB | Toledo |
| Joe Evans | DT | UTSA |
| Maxen Hook | S | Toledo |
| Giles Jackson | WR | Washington |
| Brandon Johnson | S | Oregon |
| Montrell Johnson | RB | Florida |
| Christian Johnstone | LS | Appalachian State |
| Jake Majors | C | Texas |
| BJ Mayes | CB | Texas A&M |
| Taylor Morin | WR | Wake Forest |
| Hollin Pierce | T | Rutgers |
| ShunDerrick Powell | RB | Central Arkansas |
| Jereme Robinson | DE | Kansas |
| Marcus Tate | G | Clemson |

== Preseason transactions ==
Transactions below occurred between the day after the Eagles' first preseason game and the day before their first regular season game.

=== Cuts to 53 ===
| Position | Name | 2025 team | Designation |
|---|---|---|---|
| WR | Ife Adeyi | TBD | Waived |
| LB | Chance Campbell | PS | Waived |
| WR | Elijah Cooks | PS | Waived |
| LB | Lance Dixon | TBD | Waived |
| DT | Joe Evans | TBD | Waived |
| LB | Dallas Gant | TBD | Waived |
| G | Kenyon Green | PS | Waived |
| S | Maxen Hook | TBD | Waived |
| LS | Charley Hughlett | Philadelphia Eagles | Released |
| TE | E. J. Jenkins | PS | Waived |
| CB | Brandon Johnson | PS | Waived |
| RB | Montrell Johnson Jr. | TBD | Waived |
| LB | Patrick Johnson | PS | Released |
| T | Kendall Lamm | Miami Dolphins | Released |
| TE | Cameron Latu | PS | Waived |
| WR | Terrace Marshall Jr. | PS | Released |
| LB | Ochaun Mathis | TBD | Waived |
| QB | Kyle McCord | PS | Waived |
| WR | Taylor Morin | TBD | Waived |
| TE | Nick Muse | TBD | Waived |
| CB | Parry Nickerson | PS | Released |
| T | Hollin Pierce | PS | Waived |
| RB | ShunDerrick Powell | TBD | Waived |
| LB | Antwaun Powell-Ryland | PS | Waived |
| CB | Eli Ricks | PS | Waived |
| DE | Jereme Robinson | TBD | Waived |
| RB | Keilan Robinson | New York Jets | Waived |
| DT | Justin Rogers | TBD | Waived |
| S | Andre' Sam | PS | Waived |
| WR | Ainias Smith | Carolina Panthers | Waived |
| DT | Jacob Sykes | TBD | Waived |
| T | Laekin Vakalahi | TBD | Waived |
| WR | Avery Williams | TBD | Released |
| CB | A. J. Woods | TBD | Waived |

=== Preseason signings ===
Players below were signed to the 53-man roster.

| Position | Player | Tag | 2025 offseason team | Date signed |
|---|---|---|---|---|
| DT | Justin Rogers | UFA | Seattle Seahawks | August 12 |
| LB | Chance Campbell | UFA | Tennessee Titans | August 20 |
| LS | Charley Hughlett | UFA | Philadelphia Eagles | August 27 |
| C | Willie Lampkin | WVR | Los Angeles Rams | August 27 |
| G | Kenyon Green | UFA | Philadelphia Eagles | August 31 |

=== Preseason trades ===
| Date | Player(s)/Asset(s) received | Team | Player(s)/Asset(s) traded | Source |
|---|---|---|---|---|
| August 18 | WR John Metchie III, 2026 6th round selection | Houston Texans | TE Harrison Bryant, 2026 5th round selection | |
| August 24 | QB Sam Howell, 2026 6th round selection | Minnesota Vikings | 2026 5th round selection, 2027 7th round selection | |
| August 25 | 2027 6th round selection | Green Bay Packers | T Darian Kinnard | |
| August 25 | T Fred Johnson | Jacksonville Jaguars | 2026 7th round selection | |

=== Preseason cuts ===
Players below were released outside of the league mandated cut date.

| Position | Player | 2025 team | Release Date |
|---|---|---|---|
| LS | Christian Johnstone | TBD | August 12 |
| WR | Giles Jackson | TBD | August 20 |
| QB | Dorian Thompson-Robinson | TBD | August 24 |
| G | Trevor Keegan | Dallas Cowboys | August 27 |
| S | Tristin McCollum | Las Vegas Raiders | August 27 |
| CB | Tariq Castro-Fields | TBD | August 29 |

== Regular season transactions ==
Players listed below were involved in a transaction after the Eagles first game of the regular season.

=== Practice squad elevations ===
Players below were activated via a standard elevation prior to a game. A standard elevation is when a team temporarily activates a player from the practice squad to the active roster and allows them to send the player back to the practice squad without needing to clear waivers first.

| Name | Position | Week(s) |
|---|---|---|
| Marcus Epps | S | 1, 2, 3 |
| Gabe Hall | DT | 6 |
| Patrick Johnson | OLB | 1, 10, 13 |
| Cameron Latu | TE | 2, 3 |
| EJ Jenkins | TE | 7, 16 |
| Andre' Sam | S | 13, 14, 15 |
| Brandon Johnson | S | 16, 17, 18 |
| Charley Hughlett | LS | 18 |

=== Signings ===
Players below were signed to the 53-man roster.

| Position | Player | Tag | 2025 offseason team | Date signed | Notes |
|---|---|---|---|---|---|
| DE | Za'Darius Smith | UFA | Detroit Lions | September 5 | 1 year, $9 million |
| OLB | Patrick Johnson | UFA | Philadelphia Eagles | September 8 | |
| G | Kenyon Green | UFA | Philadelphia Eagles | September 17 | |
| WR | Xavier Gipson | WVR | New York Giants | September 22 | |
| S | Marcus Epps | UFA | Philadelphia Eagles | September 24 | |
| TE | Cameron Latu | UFA | Philadelphia Eagles | September 24 | |
| CB | Parry Nickerson | UFA | Philadelphia Eagles | September 24 | |
| LS | Cal Adomitis | UFA | Cincinnati Bengals | September 30 | |
| DE | Brandon Graham | UFA | Retired | October 21 | 1 year |

=== Trades ===
| Date | Player(s)/Asset(s) received | Team | Player(s)/Asset(s) traded | Source |
|---|---|---|---|---|
| September 9 | RB Tank Bigsby | Jacksonville Jaguars | 2026 5th round selection, 2026 6th round selection | |
| October 29 | CB Michael Carter II, 2027 7th round selection | New York Jets | WR John Metchie III, 2027 6th round selection | |
| November 1 | CB Jaire Alexander, 2027 7th round selection | Baltimore Ravens | 2026 6th round selection | |
| November 3 | LB Jaelan Phillips | Miami Dolphins | 2026 3rd round selection | |

=== Releases ===
Players below were released from the 53-man roster.

| Position | Player | 2025 team | Date | Designation |
|---|---|---|---|---|
| G | Kenyon Green | Philadelphia Eagles | September 6 | Waived |
| G | Kenyon Green | Baltimore Ravens | September 22 | Waived |
| DT | Gabe Hall | Philadelphia Eagles | September 9 | Waived |
| S | Lewis Cine | TBD | September 15 | Waived |
| CB | Parry Nickerson | Philadelphia Eagles | October 27 | Released |
| LB | Patrick Johnson | Philadelphia Eagles | November 4 | Released |
| WR | Xavier Gipson | TBD | December 7 | Waived |
| LS | Cal Adomitis | TBD | December 9 | Waived |
| LS | Charley Hughlett | TBD | December 29 | Waived |

==== Retirements ====
| Position | Player | Years with the Eagles | Years in the NFL |
|---|---|---|---|
| DE | Za'Darius Smith | 0 | 11 |
| CB | Jaire Alexander | 0 | 8 |

=== Injuries ===
| Position | Player | Time of injury | Type of injury | Reserve list | Game(s) missed | Source(s) |
|---|---|---|---|---|---|---|
| CB | Jakorian Bennett | Week 3 | pectoral | Reserve/injured | Weeks 4–10 | |
| WR | A.J. Brown | Undisclosed | hamstring | – | Week 8 | |
| TE | Grant Calcaterra | Week 5 | oblique | – | Weeks 6–7 | |
| DT | Jalen Carter | Week 6 practice | heel | – | Week 6 | |
| WR | Darius Cooper | Undisclosed | shoulder | Reserve/injured | Weeks 4–7 | |
| G | Landon Dickerson | Week 5 | ankle | – | Week 6 | |
| S | Marcus Epps | Undisclosed | Undisclosed | Reserve/injured | Weeks 10–13 | |
| TE | Dallas Goedert | Week 1 | sprained knee | – | Week 2 | |
| LS | Charley Hughlett | Undisclosed | Undisclosed | Reserve/injured | Weeks 5–8 | |
| CB | Adoree' Jackson | Week 7 | concussion | – | Week 8 | |
| C | Cam Jurgens | Week 7 | knee | – | Weeks 8–10 | |
| C | Willie Lampkin | Preseason | knee | Reserve/injured | Weeks 1–8 | |
| QB | Tanner McKee | Training camp | fractured right thumb | – | Weeks 1–3 | |
| OLB | Azeez Ojulari | Week 7 | hamstring | Reserve/injured | Weeks 8–13 | |
| OLB | Ogbo Okoronkwo | Week 4 | torn triceps | Reserve/injured | Season-ending, starting Week 5 | |
| RB | Will Shipley | Week 1 | fractured rib | – | Weeks 2–3 | |
| OLB | Nolan Smith Jr. | Week 3 | tricep | Reserve/injured | Weeks 4–8 | |
| FB | Ben VanSumeren | Week 1 | torn patella tendon | Reserve/injured | Entire 2025 season | |
| T | Cameron Williams | Week 2 practice | shoulder | Reserve/injured | Weeks 2–7 | |

== Personnel ==
=== Staff / Coaches ===
2025 Philadelphia Eagles staff
| Front office: Chairman/CEO – Jeffrey Lurie; President – Don Smolenski; General manager/executive vice president – Howie Roseman; Assistant general manager – Jon Ferrari; Assistant general manager – Alec Halaby; Senior vice president/Tertiary football executive – Bryce Johnston; Senior advisor to the general manager/chief security officer – Dom DiSandro; Vice president of football operations and strategy – Adam Berry; Vice president of football operations – Jeff Scott; Head of football development and strategy – Connor Barwin; Vice president of player personnel – Charles Walls; Vice president of player personnel – Alan Wolking; Senior personnel director/advisor to the general manager – Joe Douglas; Senior personnel director/advisor to the general manager – Matt Russell; Director of player personnel – Phil Bhaya; Assistant director of player personnel - Jeremy Gray; Director of football operations/pro scout – Ameena Soliman; Senior director of football analytics and strategy – James Gilman; Director of football analytics - Jonathan Liu; Assistant director of football research and strategy - Zachary Steever; Director of college scouting - Ryan Myers; Assistant director of college scouting - Matt Holland; Assistant director of pro scouting - Jarrod Kilburn; Head coaches: Head coach – Nick Sirianni; Assistant head coach/running backs – Jemal Singleton; Offensive coaches: Offensive coordinator – Kevin Patullo; Pass game coordinator - Parks Frazier; Quarterbacks – Scot Loeffler; Wide receivers – Aaron Moorehead; Tight ends – Jason Michael; Run game coordinator/offensive line – Jeff Stoutland; Assistant offensive line – Greg Austin; Offensive assistant – Montgomery VanGorder; Offensive quality control – Eric Dickerson | Defensive coaches: Defensive coordinator – Vic Fangio; Senior defensive assistant/defensive line – Clint Hurtt; Defensive ends/outside linebackers – Jeremiah Washburn; Inside linebackers – Bobby King; Passing game coordinator/defensive backs – Christian Parker; Cornerbacks – Roy Anderson; Safeties – Joe Kasper; Defensive quality control/assistant linebackers – Ronell Williams; Defensive assistant – Tyler Yelk; Defensive quality control – Tyler Scudder; Special teams coaches: Special teams coordinator – Michael Clay; Assistant special teams coordinator – Joe Pannunzio; Special teams assistant – Tyler Brown; Strength and conditioning: Head athletic trainer – Tom Hunkele; Head strength and conditioning – Fernando Noriega |

=== Final roster ===
2025 Philadelphia Eagles roster
| Quarterbacks (QB): 14 Sam Howell; 1 Jalen Hurts; 16 Tanner McKee; Running backs (RB): 26 Saquon Barkley; 37 Tank Bigsby; 29 A. J. Dillon; 28 Will Shipley; Wide receivers (WR): 11 A. J. Brown; 80 Darius Cooper; 18 Britain Covey; 2 Jahan Dotson; 6 DeVonta Smith; Tight ends (TE): 81 Grant Calcaterra; 88 Dallas Goedert; 83 Kylen Granson; 36 Cameron Latu | Offensive linemen (OL): 69 Landon Dickerson LG; 74 Fred Johnson LT; 65 Lane Johnson RT; 51 Cam Jurgens C; 66 Drew Kendall C; 68 Jordan Mailata LT; 79 Matt Pryor RG; 56 Tyler Steen RG; 64 Brett Toth LG; 73 Cameron Williams RT; Defensive linemen (DL): 98 Jalen Carter DT; 90 Jordan Davis DT; 55 Brandon Graham DE; 97 Moro Ojomo DT; 95 Ty Robinson DT; 94 Byron Young DT | Linebackers (LB): 53 Zack Baun ILB; 30 Jihaad Campbell ILB; 17 Nakobe Dean ILB; 58 Jalyx Hunt OLB; 42 Smael Mondon Jr. ILB; 50 Jaelan Phillips OLB; 3 Nolan Smith OLB; 54 Jeremiah Trotter Jr. ILB; 0 Joshua Uche OLB; Defensive backs (DB): 23 Jakorian Bennett CB; 32 Reed Blankenship FS; 21 Sydney Brown SS; 35 Michael Carter II CB; 33 Cooper DeJean CB; 39 Marcus Epps FS; 8 Adoree' Jackson CB; 22 Mac McWilliams CB; 27 Quinyon Mitchell CB; 7 Kelee Ringo CB; Special teams (ST): 4 Jake Elliott K; 10 Braden Mann P | Practice squad: 59 Chance Campbell ILB; 41 Tariq Castro-Fields CB; 72 Luke Felix-Fualalo RT (PS/I); 77 Ta'Quon Graham DT; 82 Danny Gray WR; 96 Gabe Hall DT; 47 Charley Hughlett LS; 84 E. J. Jenkins TE; 49 Brandon Johnson S (PS/I); 48 Patrick Johnson OLB; 75 Jake Majors C; 85 Terrace Marshall Jr. WR; 19 Kyle McCord QB; 34 Parry Nickerson CB; 63 Hollin Pierce RT; 31 Andre' Sam S; 86 Quez Watkins WR; Reserve: 78 Myles Hinton LT (IR); 61 Willie Lampkin C (IR); 24 Andrew Mukuba SS (IR); 13 Azeez Ojulari OLB (IR/DFR); 45 Ogbo Okoronkwo OLB (IR); 43 Ben VanSumeren FB (IR); 89 Johnny Wilson WR (IR); Rookies in italics 53 active, 7 reserve, 15 practice squad (2 exempt) |

== Preseason ==
| Week | Date | Opponent | Result | Record | Venue | Recap |
|---|---|---|---|---|---|---|
| 1 | August 7 | Cincinnati Bengals | W 34–27 | 1–0 | Lincoln Financial Field | Recap |
| 2 | August 16 | Cleveland Browns | L 13–22 | 1–1 | Lincoln Financial Field | Recap |
| 3 | August 22 | at New York Jets | W 19–17 | 2–1 | MetLife Stadium | Recap |

== Regular season ==
As defending champions of Super Bowl LIX, the Eagles earned the right to host the Week 1 kickoff game on September 4.

=== Schedule ===
| Week | Date | Opponent | Result | Record | Venue | Recap |
|---|---|---|---|---|---|---|
| 1 | September 4 | **Dallas Cowboys** | **W** 24–20 | 1–0 | Lincoln Financial Field | Recap |
| 2 | September 14 | at Kansas City Chiefs | **W** 20–17 | 2–0 | Arrowhead Stadium | Recap |
| 3 | September 21 | Los Angeles Rams | **W** 33–26 | 3–0 | Lincoln Financial Field | Recap |
| 4 | September 28 | at Tampa Bay Buccaneers | **W** 31–25 | 4–0 | Raymond James Stadium | Recap |
| 5 | October 5 | Denver Broncos | **L** 17–21 | 4–1 | Lincoln Financial Field | Recap |
| 6 | October 9 | at **New York Giants** | **L** 17–34 | 4–2 | MetLife Stadium | Recap |
| 7 | October 19 | at Minnesota Vikings | **W** 28–22 | 5–2 | U.S. Bank Stadium | Recap |
| 8 | October 26 | **New York Giants** | **W** 38–20 | 6–2 | Lincoln Financial Field | Recap |
| 9 | Bye | | | | | |
| 10 | November 10 | at Green Bay Packers | **W** 10–7 | 7–2 | Lambeau Field | Recap |
| 11 | November 16 | Detroit Lions | **W** 16–9 | 8–2 | Lincoln Financial Field | Recap |
| 12 | November 23 | at **Dallas Cowboys** | **L** 21–24 | 8–3 | AT&T Stadium | Recap |
| 13 | November 28 | Chicago Bears | **L** 15–24 | 8–4 | Lincoln Financial Field | Recap |
| 14 | December 8 | at Los Angeles Chargers | **L** 19–22 (OT) | 8–5 | SoFi Stadium | Recap |
| 15 | December 14 | Las Vegas Raiders | **W** 31–0 | 9–5 | Lincoln Financial Field | Recap |
| 16 | December 20 | at **Washington Commanders** | **W** 29–18 | 10–5 | Northwest Stadium | Recap |
| 17 | December 28 | at Buffalo Bills | **W** 13–12 | 11–5 | Highmark Stadium | Recap |
| 18 | January 4 | **Washington Commanders** | **L** 17–24 | 11–6 | Lincoln Financial Field | Recap |

Note: Intra-division opponents are in bold text.

=== Game summaries ===
==== Week 1: vs. Dallas Cowboys ====
NFL Kickoff Game

Week 1: Dallas Cowboys at Philadelphia Eagles – Game summary

| Quarter | 1 | 2 | 3 | 4 | Total |
|---|---|---|---|---|---|
| Cowboys | 7 | 13 | 0 | 0 | **20** |
| **Eagles** | 7 | 14 | 3 | 0 | **24** |

at Lincoln Financial Field, Philadelphia, Pennsylvania

- Date: September 4
- Game time: 8:20 p.m. EDT
- Game weather: Rain, 75 °F (24 °C)
- Game attendance: 69,879
- Referee: Shawn Smith
- TV announcers (NBC): Mike Tirico, Cris Collinsworth and Melissa Stark
- Recap, Game Book

Game information

**First quarter**

- DAL – Javonte Williams 1-yard run (Brandon Aubrey kick), 11:49. Cowboys 7–0. **Drive: 6 plays, 53 yards, 3:11.**
- PHI – Jalen Hurts 4-yard run (Jake Elliott kick), 5:55. Tied 7–7. **Drive: 10 plays, 70 yards, 5:54.**

**Second quarter**

- DAL – Javonte Williams 1-yard run (Brandon Aubrey kick), 14:56. Cowboys 14–7. **Drive: 9 plays, 88 yards, 5:59.**
- PHI – Jalen Hurts 8-yard run (Jake Elliott kick), 6:46. Tied 14–14. **Drive: 12 plays, 65 yards, 8:10.**
- DAL – Brandon Aubrey 41-yard field goal, 2:34. Cowboys 17–14. **Drive: 10 plays, 46 yards, 4:12.**
- PHI – Saquon Barkley 10-yard run (Jake Elliott kick), 0:51. Eagles 21–17. **Drive: 8 plays, 81 yards, 1:43.**
- DAL – Brandon Aubrey 53-yard field goal, 0:00. Eagles 21–20. **Drive: 7 plays, 53 yards, 0:51.**

**Third quarter**

- PHI – Jake Elliott 58-yard field goal, 8:30. Eagles 24–20. **Drive: 10 plays, 32 yards, 6:30.**

**Fourth quarter**

- No scoring plays

**Top passers**

- DAL – Dak Prescott – 21/34, 188 yards
- PHI – Jalen Hurts – 19/23, 152 yards

**Top rushers**

- DAL – Javonte Williams – 15 rushes, 54 yards, 2 TD
- PHI – Jalen Hurts – 14 rushes, 62 yards, 2 TD

**Top receivers**

- DAL – CeeDee Lamb – 7 receptions, 110 yards
- PHI – Jahan Dotson – 3 receptions, 59 yards

The Eagles hosted the Dallas Cowboys during the NFL Kickoff Game. Right after the opening kickoff and just 0:06 into the game, Jalen Carter was ejected for spitting on Cowboys quarterback Dak Prescott. Both teams scored touchdown runs on their first two drives, with Javonte Williams scoring both of Dallas' touchdowns and Jalen Hurts scoring both of Philadelphia's. The Eagles defense then held the Cowboys to a Brandon Aubrey field goal on the third Cowboys drive. Thereafter, the Eagles claimed a 21–17 lead on a touchdown run by Saquon Barkley and would not trail for the remainder of the game. The Cowboys answered with Aubrey a 53-yard field goal to trim the Eagles lead to 21–20 prior to halftime. On the Eagles opening drive in the third quarter, Jake Elliott converted a 58-yard field goal to restore Philadelphia's lead to four. After the Cowboys marched deep into Philadelphia territory, rookie Jihaad Campbell and Byron Young forced a fumble off of former Eagle Miles Sanders, which Quinyon Mitchell recovered. Immediately afterwards, the game was in a weather delay for over an hour due to thunderstorms. Neither team scored after the delay, preserving the Eagles' 24–20 victory, their sixth win in their last seven home games against the Cowboys.

==== Week 2: at Kansas City Chiefs ====
Week 2: Philadelphia Eagles at Kansas City Chiefs – Game summary

| Quarter | 1 | 2 | 3 | 4 | Total |
|---|---|---|---|---|---|
| **Eagles** | 7 | 3 | 3 | 7 | **20** |
| Chiefs | 0 | 10 | 0 | 7 | **17** |

at Arrowhead Stadium, Kansas City, Missouri

- Date: September 14
- Game time: 4:25 p.m. EDT/3:25 p.m. CDT
- Game weather: Fair, 88 °F (31 °C)
- Game attendance: 73,558
- Referee: Alex Kemp
- TV announcers (Fox): Kevin Burkhardt, Tom Brady, Erin Andrews and Tom Rinaldi
- Recap, Game Book

Game information

**First quarter**

- PHI – Saquon Barkley 13-yard run (Jake Elliott kick), 0:46. Eagles 7–0. **Drive: 8 plays, 52 yards, 4:08.**

**Second quarter**

- KC – Harrison Butker 56-yard field goal, 11:42. Eagles 7–3. **Drive: 8 plays, 31 yards, 4:04.**
- KC – Patrick Mahomes 13-yard run (Harrison Butker kick), 2:44. Chiefs 10–7. **Drive: 10 plays, 69 yards, 5:37.**
- PHI – Jake Elliott 58-yard field goal, 0:00. Tied 10–10. **Drive: 9 plays, 38 yards, 2:44.**

**Third quarter**

- PHI – Jake Elliott 51-yard field goal, 11:28. Eagles 13–10. **Drive: 4 plays, 2 yards, 1:28.**

**Fourth quarter**

- PHI – Jalen Hurts 1-yard run (Jake Elliott kick), 7:48. Eagles 20–10. **Drive: 10 plays, 59 yards, 5:08.**
- KC – Tyquan Thornton 49-yard pass from Patrick Mahomes (Harrison Butker kick), 3:00. Eagles 20–17. **Drive: 6 plays, 72 yards, 1:24.**

**Top passers**

- PHI – Jalen Hurts – 15/22, 101 yards
- KC – Patrick Mahomes – 16/29, 187 yards, TD, INT

**Top rushers**

- PHI – Saquon Barkley – 22 rushes, 88 yards, TD
- KC – Patrick Mahomes – 7 rushes, 66 yards, TD

**Top receivers**

- PHI – Devonta Smith – 4 receptions, 53 yards
- KC – Travis Kelce – 4 receptions, 61 yards

The game was largely a defensive battle, with the score tied 10–10 at halftime. The Eagles took a 13–10 lead in the third quarter before a game-deciding play occurred early in the fourth. Safety Andrew Mukuba intercepted a pass from Patrick Mahomes that bounced out of Travis Kelce’s hands in the end zone. The Eagles capitalized on the turnover with a touchdown to extend their lead to 20–10. Although the Chiefs scored a late touchdown to cut the deficit to 20–17, the Eagles ran out the clock on their final possession to secure the victory.

With their third straight win over Kansas City since the 2023 season, the Eagles improved to 2–0 and snapped the Chiefs' 12-game home winning streak.

This victory gave the Eagles an all-time winning record in the regular season for the first time in franchise history (640–639–27).

==== Week 3: vs. Los Angeles Rams ====
Week 3: Los Angeles Rams at Philadelphia Eagles – Game summary

| Quarter | 1 | 2 | 3 | 4 | Total |
|---|---|---|---|---|---|
| Rams | 10 | 9 | 7 | 0 | **26** |
| **Eagles** | 7 | 0 | 14 | 12 | **33** |

at Lincoln Financial Field, Philadelphia, Pennsylvania

- Date: September 21
- Game time: 1:00 p.m. EDT
- Game weather: Sunny, 73 °F (23 °C)
- Game attendance: 69,879
- Referee: Brad Rogers
- TV announcers (Fox): Joe Davis, Greg Olsen and Pam Oliver
- Recap, Game Book

Game information

**First quarter**

- PHI – Jalen Hurts 1-yard run (Jake Elliott kick), 8:07. Eagles 7–0. **Drive: 9 plays, 38 yards, 5:21.**
- LAR – Joshua Karty 51-yard field goal, 4:00. Eagles 7–3. **Drive: 9 plays, 37 yards, 4:07.**
- LAR – Davante Adams 44-yard pass from Matthew Stafford (Joshua Karty kick), 1:20. Rams 10–7. **Drive: 3 plays, 54 yards, 0:55.**

**Second quarter**

- LAR – Joshua Karty 28-yard field goal, 9:15. Rams 13–7. **Drive: 12 plays, 56 yards, 5:34.**
- LAR – Joshua Karty 33-yard field goal, 3:43. Rams 16–7. **Drive: 8 plays, 39 yards, 4:01.**
- LAR – Joshua Karty 46-yard field goal, 0:10. Rams 19–7. **Drive: 5 plays, 20 yards, 1:42.**

**Third quarter**

- LAR – Kyren Williams 10-yard pass from Matthew Stafford (Joshua Karty kick), 14:06. Rams 26–7. **Drive: 1 play, 10 yards, 0:06.**
- PHI – Dallas Goedert 33-yard pass from Jalen Hurts (Jake Elliott kick), 11:38. Rams 26–14. **Drive: 5 plays, 79 yards, 2:28.**
- PHI – A. J. Brown 9-yard pass from Jalen Hurts (Jake Elliott kick), 2:16. Rams 26–21. **Drive: 13 plays, 87 yards, 6:27.**

**Fourth quarter**

- PHI – Devonta Smith 4-yard pass from Jalen Hurts (pass failed), 1:48. Eagles 27–26. **Drive: 17 plays, 91 yards, 6:54.**
- PHI – Jordan Davis 61-yard blocked field goal return, 0:00. Eagles 33–26.

**Top passers**

- LAR – Matthew Stafford – 19/33, 196 yards, 2 TD, INT
- PHI – Jalen Hurts – 21/32, 226 yards, 3 TD

**Top rushers**

- LAR – Kyren Williams – 20 rushes, 94 yards
- PHI – Saquon Barkley – 18 rushes, 46 yards

**Top receivers**

- LAR – Puka Nacua – 11 receptions, 112 yards
- PHI – A. J. Brown – 6 receptions, 109 yards, TD

The Eagles returned home to face the Los Angeles Rams in a rematch of the previous season's NFC Divisional Round. Philadelphia took an early 7–0 lead as Zack Baun intercepted Matthew Stafford, followed by a Jalen Hurts touchdown run. From there, however, the Eagles would struggle for the remainder of the first half, falling behind 19–7 at halftime. The deficit grew in the 3rd quarter after the Rams forced a Hurts strip sack, then scored on a Kyren Williams touchdown reception to build LA's lead to 26–7. However, the Eagles would trim the deficit to 26–21 after Hurts threw his first two touchdown passes of the season to Dallas Goedert and A.J. Brown. In the fourth quarter, the Rams and Eagles would both turn the ball over on downs before Joshua Karty attempted his fifth field goal to try and give Los Angeles an eight-point lead. The kick would be blocked by Jalen Carter, but an unsportsmanlike conduct penalty on Carter would push them back to their own 9-yard line. Jalen Hurts lead the Eagles on a seven minute, 91-yard touchdown drive, culminating in a DeVonta Smith touchdown reception on fourth down for a 27–26 lead. The two-point conversion would be stopped by the Rams, however, putting Philadelphia's fate in the hands of their defense with less than two minutes remaining. Los Angeles would make one final push, storming to the Eagles' 26 to set up a potential game-winning 44-yard field goal attempt by Karty. Jordan Davis blocked Karty's attempt and returned it for a touchdown as time expired, sealing the 33–26 win for Philadelphia. It was the Eagles largest comeback at Lincoln Financial Field ever, and their largest comeback overall since the Miracle at the New Meadowlands back in 2010.

With the win, the Eagles started 3–0 for the third time under Nick Sirianni.

==== Week 4: at Tampa Bay Buccaneers ====
Week 4: Philadelphia Eagles at Tampa Bay Buccaneers – Game summary

| Quarter | 1 | 2 | 3 | 4 | Total |
|---|---|---|---|---|---|
| **Eagles** | 14 | 10 | 7 | 0 | **31** |
| Buccaneers | 3 | 3 | 14 | 5 | **25** |

at Raymond James Stadium, Tampa, Florida

- Date: September 28
- Game time: 1:00 p.m. EDT
- Game weather: Cloudy, 88 °F (31 °C)
- Game attendance: 64,122
- Referee: Alan Eck
- TV announcers (Fox): Kevin Burkhardt, Tom Brady, Erin Andrews and Tom Rinaldi
- Recap, Game Book

Game information

**First quarter**

- PHI – Sydney Brown 35-yard blocked punt return (Jake Elliott kick), 12:51. Eagles 7–0. **Drive: 5 plays, 28 yards, 2:09.**
- PHI – Dallas Goedert 2-yard pass from Jalen Hurts (Jake Elliott kick), 7:08. Eagles 14–0. **Drive: 8 plays, 73 yards, 4:14.**
- TB – Chase McLaughlin 42-yard field goal, 0:00. Eagles 14–3. **Drive: 12 plays, 49 yards, 7:08.**

**Second quarter**

- PHI – Dallas Goedert 5-yard pass from Jalen Hurts (Jake Elliott kick), 6:10. Eagles 21–3. **Drive: 6 plays, 67 yards, 3:34.**
- PHI – Jake Elliott 39-yard field goal, 0:58. Eagles 24–3. **Drive: 12 plays, 54 yards, 4:02.**
- TB – Chase McLaughlin 65-yard field goal, 0:00. Eagles 24–6. **Drive: 6 plays, 30 yards, 0:58.**

**Third quarter**

- TB – Emeka Egbuka 77-yard pass from Baker Mayfield (Chase McLaughlin kick), 9:51. Eagles 24–13. **Drive: 1 play, 77 yards, 0:13.**
- PHI – Saquon Barkley 6-yard run (Jake Elliott kick), 3:51. Eagles 31–13. **Drive: 6 plays, 25 yards, 3:28.**
- TB – Bucky Irving 72-yard pass from Baker Mayfield (Chase McLaughlin kick), 2:10. Eagles 31–20. **Drive: 4 plays, 86 yards, 1:41.**

**Fourth quarter**

- TB – Chase McLaughlin 58-yard field goal, 12:16. Eagles 31–23. **Drive: 6 plays, 29 yards, 2:36.**
- TB – Braden Mann run out of the end zone for a safety, 0:00. Eagles 31–25.

**Top passers**

- PHI – Jalen Hurts – 15/24, 130 yards, 2 TD
- TB – Baker Mayfield – 22/40, 289 yards, 2 TD, INT

**Top rushers**

- PHI – Jalen Hurts – 9 rushes, 62 yards
- TB – Bucky Irving – 15 rushes, 63 yards

**Top receivers**

- PHI – Dallas Goedert – 4 receptions, 37 yards, 2 TD
- TB – Bucky Irving – 5 receptions, 102 yards, TD

The Eagles dominated in the first half, taking a 24–3 lead right before halftime. Despite a poor offensive effort in the second half, Philadelphia held on to win 31–25. Baker Mayfield threw a crucial interception in the endzone, and the Eagles stopped the Buccaneers subsequent drive before running out the clock via intentional safety. This was the Eagles' first victory against the Buccaneers since 2023.

==== Week 5: vs. Denver Broncos ====
Week 5: Denver Broncos at Philadelphia Eagles – Game summary

| Quarter | 1 | 2 | 3 | 4 | Total |
|---|---|---|---|---|---|
| **Broncos** | 3 | 0 | 0 | 18 | **21** |
| Eagles | 3 | 7 | 7 | 0 | **17** |

at Lincoln Financial Field, Philadelphia, Pennsylvania

- Date: October 5
- Game time: 1:00 p.m. EDT
- Game weather: Sunny, 80 °F (27 °C)
- Game attendance: 69,879
- Referee: Adrian Hill
- TV announcers (CBS): Jim Nantz, Tony Romo and Tracy Wolfson
- Recap, Game Book

Game information

**First quarter**

- DEN – Wil Lutz 55-yard field goal, 6:49. Broncos 3–0. **Drive: 12 plays, 32 yards, 5:19.**
- PHI – Jake Elliott 31-yard field goal, 0:29. Tied 3–3. **Drive: 12 plays, 70 yards, 6:20.**

**Second quarter**

- PHI – Dallas Goedert 2-yard pass from Jalen Hurts (Jake Elliott kick), 7:20. Eagles 10–3. **Drive: 7 plays, 90 yards, 4:32.**

**Third quarter**

- PHI – Saquon Barkley 47-yard pass from Jalen Hurts (Jake Elliott kick), 13:23. Eagles 17–3. **Drive: 4 plays, 74 yards, 1:37.**

**Fourth quarter**

- DEN – J. K. Dobbins 2-yard run (Wil Lutz kick), 13:11. Eagles 17–10. **Drive: 10 plays, 64 yards, 4:27.**
- DEN – Evan Engram 11-yard pass from Bo Nix (Bo Nix–Troy Franklin pass), 7:36. Broncos 18–17. **Drive: 6 plays, 72 yards, 3:32.**
- DEN – Wil Lutz 36-yard field goal, 1:11. Broncos 21–17. **Drive: 11 plays, 50 yards, 3:49.**

**Top passers**

- DEN – Bo Nix – 24/39, 242 yards, TD
- PHI – Jalen Hurts – 23/38, 280 yards, 2 TD

**Top rushers**

- DEN – J. K. Dobbins – 20 rushes, 79 yards, TD
- PHI – Saquon Barkley – 6 rushes, 30 yards

**Top receivers**

- DEN – Courtland Sutton – 8 receptions, 99 yards
- PHI – Devonta Smith – 8 receptions, 114 yards

Similar to the previous week, the Eagles struggled on both sides of the ball in the second half; however, their struggles finally caught up to them, resulting in their first loss of the season. After building a 17–3 lead, the Eagles were unable to hold off a fourth-quarter rally by Bo Nix and the Denver Broncos, who scored 18 unanswered points to beat the Eagles 21–17. Philadelphia had an opportunity to win the game late, as quarterback Jalen Hurts led a drive to Denver's 29-yard line, but his final Hail Mary attempt fell incomplete as time expired.

With the loss, the Eagles dropped to a 4–1 record and were defeated at home by the Broncos for just the second time in franchise history, and for the first time since a 33–7 loss in 1986. The loss also ended Philadelphia’s 10-game winning streak and 12-game home winning streak.

==== Week 6: at New York Giants ====
Week 6: Philadelphia Eagles at New York Giants – Game summary

| Quarter | 1 | 2 | 3 | 4 | Total |
|---|---|---|---|---|---|
| Eagles | 10 | 7 | 0 | 0 | **17** |
| **Giants** | 13 | 7 | 7 | 7 | **34** |

at MetLife Stadium, East Rutherford, New Jersey

- Date: October 9
- Game time: 8:15 p.m. EDT
- Game weather: Fair, 53 °F (12 °C)
- Game attendance: 81,564
- Referee: Clete Blakeman
- TV announcers (Prime Video): Al Michaels, Kirk Herbstreit and Kaylee Hartung
- Recap, Game Book

Game information

**First quarter**

- PHI – Jake Elliott 42-yard field goal, 11:59. Eagles 3–0. **Drive: 6 plays, 36 yards, 3:01.**
- NYG – Jaxson Dart 20-yard run (Jude McAtamney kick), 9:59. Giants 7–3. **Drive: 6 plays, 54 yards, 2:00.**
- NYG – Wan'Dale Robinson 35-yard pass from Jaxson Dart (kick failed), 5:37. Giants 13–3. **Drive: 4 plays, 66 yards, 2:02.**
- PHI – Dallas Goedert 3-yard pass from Jalen Hurts (Jake Elliott kick), 1:49. Giants 13–10. **Drive: 8 plays, 75 yards, 3:48.**

**Second quarter**

- PHI – Jalen Hurts 1-yard run (Jake Elliott kick), 6:56. Eagles 17–13. **Drive: 13 plays, 74 yards, 7:54.**
- NYG – Cameron Skattebo 4-yard run (Jude McAtamney kick), 1:19. Giants 20–17. **Drive: 15 plays, 67 yards, 5:37.**

**Third quarter**

- NYG – Cameron Skattebo 1-yard run (Jude McAtamney kick), 7:56. Giants 27–17. **Drive: 9 plays, 56 yards, 4:12.**

**Fourth quarter**

- NYG – Cameron Skattebo 1-yard run (Jude McAtamney kick), 9:41. Giants 34–17. **Drive: 3 plays, 23 yards, 1:44.**

**Top passers**

- PHI – Jalen Hurts – 24/33, 283 yards, TD, INT
- NYG – Jaxson Dart – 17/25, 195 yards, TD

**Top rushers**

- PHI – Saquon Barkley – 12 rushes, 58 yards
- NYG – Cameron Skattebo – 19 rushes, 98 yards, 3 TD

**Top receivers**

- PHI – Dallas Goedert – 9 receptions, 110 yards, TD
- NYG – Wan'Dale Robinson – 6 receptions, 84 yards, TD

Four days after their 21–17 upset loss at home to the Broncos, the Eagles looked to bounce back when they visited the rival New York Giants. Despite holding a four-point second quarter lead, the Eagles' offensive struggles continued as they once again collapsed in the second half. Jaxson Dart and Cameron Skattebo dominated the Eagles' depleted defense for 21 unanswered points, concluding in a 34–17 blowout loss for Philadelphia. It was the Eagles' fourth loss in their last six road games against the Giants. With their second straight upset loss, the Eagles fell to 4–2 and suffered their first two game losing streak since their 2023 campaign. In addition, Jalen Hurts threw his first regular season interception since November 10, 2024.

In addition to the Eagles losing, the Philadelphia Phillies (who were eliminated in Game 4 of the 2025 National League Division Series by the Los Angeles Dodgers) and Philadelphia Flyers also lost on the same night. This triple loss occurred for the first time since October 16, 1983.

==== Week 7: at Minnesota Vikings ====
Week 7: Philadelphia Eagles at Minnesota Vikings – Game summary

| Quarter | 1 | 2 | 3 | 4 | Total |
|---|---|---|---|---|---|
| **Eagles** | 7 | 7 | 7 | 7 | **28** |
| Vikings | 3 | 3 | 10 | 6 | **22** |

at U.S. Bank Stadium, Minneapolis, Minnesota

- Date: October 19
- Game time: 1:00 p.m. EDT/12:00 p.m. CDT
- Game weather: None (indoor stadium)
- Game attendance: 66,899
- Referee: Bill Vinovich
- TV announcers (Fox): Adam Amin, Greg Olsen and Pam Oliver
- Recap, Game Book

Game information

**First quarter**

- PHI – A. J. Brown 37-yard pass from Jalen Hurts (Jake Elliott kick), 6:59. Eagles 7–0. **Drive: 12 plays, 75 yards, 8:01.**
- MIN – Will Reichard 59-yard field goal, 2:04. Eagles 7–3. **Drive: 11 plays, 39 yards, 4:55.**

**Second quarter**

- PHI – Jalyx Hunt 42-yard interception return (Jake Elliott kick), 13:26. Eagles 14–3.
- MIN – Will Reichard 34-yard field goal, 6:34. Eagles 14–6. **Drive: 7 plays, 64 yards, 3:03.**

**Third quarter**

- MIN – Will Reichard 28-yard field goal, 9:02. Eagles 14–9. **Drive: 10 plays, 42 yards, 5:58.**
- PHI – Devonta Smith 79-yard pass from Jalen Hurts (Jake Elliott kick), 8:07. Eagles 21–9. **Drive: 2 plays, 84 yards, 0:55.**
- MIN – Jordan Mason 1-yard run (Will Reichard kick), 3:38. Eagles 21–16. **Drive: 8 plays, 60 yards, 4:29.**

**Fourth quarter**

- MIN – Will Reichard 35-yard field goal, 10:06. Eagles 21–19. **Drive: 7 plays, 51 yards, 4:09.**
- PHI – A. J. Brown 26-yard pass from Jalen Hurts (Jake Elliott kick), 6:35. Eagles 28–19. **Drive: 7 plays, 70 yards, 3:31.**
- MIN – Will Reichard 29-yard field goal, 1:57. Eagles 28–22. **Drive: 16 plays, 61 yards, 4:38.**

**Top passers**

- PHI – Jalen Hurts – 19/23, 326 yards, 3 TD
- MIN – Carson Wentz – 26/42, 313 yards, 2 INT

**Top rushers**

- PHI – Saquon Barkley – 18 rushes, 44 yards
- MIN – Jordan Mason – 15 rushes, 57 yards, TD

**Top receivers**

- PHI – Devonta Smith – 9 receptions, 183 yards, TD
- MIN – Jordan Addison – 9 receptions, 128 yards

Looking to rebound, the Eagles traveled to Minnesota to face the Vikings and their former quarterback, Carson Wentz, now starting for the Vikings. Jalen Hurts had a breakout performance, completing 19 of 23 passes for 326 yards and three touchdowns, achieving a perfect passer rating. Facing 3rd-and-9 from their own 44-yard line with 1:45 remaining, Hurts dropped back and launched a 45-yard pass into A.J. Brown’s arms to seal the win. The Eagles snapped their two-game losing streak and improved to 5–2.

Hurts then became the third quarterback in Eagles franchise history to record a perfect passer rating.

It was later announced that longtime Eagles defensive end Brandon Graham had ended his retirement and rejoined the team.

==== Week 8: vs. New York Giants ====
Week 8: New York Giants at Philadelphia Eagles – Game summary

| Quarter | 1 | 2 | 3 | 4 | Total |
|---|---|---|---|---|---|
| Giants | 7 | 3 | 3 | 7 | **20** |
| **Eagles** | 7 | 14 | 3 | 14 | **38** |

at Lincoln Financial Field, Philadelphia, Pennsylvania

- Date: October 26
- Game time: 1:00 p.m. EDT
- Game weather: Sunny, 60 °F (16 °C)
- Game attendance: 69,879
- Referee: Brad Rogers
- TV announcers (Fox): Kevin Burkhardt, Tom Brady, Erin Andrews and Tom Rinaldi
- Recap, Game Book

Game information

**First quarter**

- PHI – Saquon Barkley 65-yard run (Jake Elliott kick), 14:43. Eagles 7–0. **Drive: 2 plays, 65 yards, 0:17.**
- NYG – Cameron Skattebo 18-yard pass from Jaxson Dart (Graham Gano kick), 2:56. Tied 7–7. **Drive: 6 plays, 52 yards, 3:14.**

**Second quarter**

- PHI – Saquon Barkley 9-yard pass from Jalen Hurts (Jake Elliott kick), 11:38. Eagles 14–7. **Drive: 11 plays, 53 yards, 6:18.**
- NYG – Graham Gano 47-yard field goal, 2:53. Eagles 14–10. **Drive: 7 plays, 37 yards, 3:20.**
- PHI – Dallas Goedert 6-yard pass from Jalen Hurts (Jake Elliott kick), 0:21. Eagles 21–10. **Drive: 7 plays, 58 yards, 2:32.**

**Third quarter**

- PHI – Jake Elliott 40-yard field goal, 7:03. Eagles 24–10. **Drive: 11 plays, 54 yards, 6:07.**
- NYG – Graham Gano 34-yard field goal, 0:19. Eagles 24–13. **Drive: 15 plays, 59 yards, 6:44.**

**Fourth quarter**

- PHI – Dallas Goedert 17-yard pass from Jalen Hurts (Jake Elliott kick), 11:17. Eagles 31–13. **Drive: 7 plays, 72 yards, 4:02.**
- PHI – Jahan Dotson 40-yard pass from Jalen Hurts (Jake Elliott kick), 5:59. Eagles 38–13. **Drive: 6 plays, 73 yards, 3:30.**
- NYG – Jaxson Dart 2-yard run (Graham Gano kick), 2:44. Eagles 38–20. **Drive: 7 plays, 65 yards, 3:15.**

**Top passers**

- NYG – Jaxson Dart – 14/24, 193 yards, TD
- PHI – Jalen Hurts – 15/20, 179 yards, 4 TD

**Top rushers**

- NYG – Tyrone Tracy Jr. – 10 rushes, 39 yards
- PHI – Saquon Barkley – 14 rushes, 150 yards, TD

**Top receivers**

- NYG – Wan'Dale Robinson – 3 receptions, 48 yards
- PHI – Devonta Smith – 6 receptions, 84 yards

With their 13th home win against New York since 2013, the Eagles avenged their earlier loss and avoided a sweep by the Giants for the first time since 2007, entering their bye week at 6–2.

==== Week 10: at Green Bay Packers ====
Week 10: Philadelphia Eagles at Green Bay Packers – Game summary

| Quarter | 1 | 2 | 3 | 4 | Total |
|---|---|---|---|---|---|
| **Eagles** | 0 | 0 | 3 | 7 | **10** |
| Packers | 0 | 0 | 0 | 7 | **7** |

at Lambeau Field, Green Bay, Wisconsin

- Date: November 10
- Game time: 8:15 p.m. EST/7:15 p.m. CST
- Game weather: Cloudy, 33 °F (1 °C)
- Game attendance: 78,254
- Referee: Clay Martin
- TV announcers (ESPN/ABC): Joe Buck, Troy Aikman, Lisa Salters and Laura Rutledge
- Recap, Game Book

Game information

**First quarter**

- No scoring plays

**Second quarter**

- No scoring plays

**Third quarter**

- PHI – Jake Elliott 39-yard field goal, 8:58. Eagles 3–0. **Drive: 10 plays, 50 yards, 6:02.**

**Fourth quarter**

- PHI – Devonta Smith 35-yard pass from Jalen Hurts (Jake Elliott kick), 10:35. Eagles 10–0. **Drive: 4 plays, 80 yards, 2:11.**
- GB – Josh Jacobs 6-yard run (Brandon McManus kick), 5:49. Eagles 10–7. **Drive: 11 plays, 75 yards, 4:46.**

**Top passers**

- PHI – Jalen Hurts – 15/26, 183 yards, TD
- GB – Jordan Love – 20/36, 176 yards

**Top rushers**

- PHI – Saquon Barkley – 22 rushes, 60 yards
- GB – Josh Jacobs – 21 rushes, 74 yards, TD

**Top receivers**

- PHI – Devonta Smith – 4 receptions, 69 yards, TD
- GB – Christian Watson – 2 receptions, 45 yards

Brandon Graham made his return to the field for the first time since playing in Super Bowl LIX.

The Eagles traveled to Lambeau Field for a highly-anticipated rematch of the previous season's Wild Card game. The first half ended scoreless as the two teams' defenses held each other in check. Jaelan Phillips, who was acquired in a midseason trade, recovered a fumble by Packers quarterback Jordan Love to end a potential Green Bay scoring opportunity in the final minute of the first half. In the third quarter, Jake Elliott kicked a field goal to give Philadelphia a 3–0 lead. In the fourth quarter, the Eagles extended their lead to 10–0 with a DeVonta Smith touchdown reception, but the Packers immediately answered on the ensuing drive with a Josh Jacobs run, cutting the Eagles' lead back to three. Just after the two-minute warning, Phillips came up again and made a crucial fourth-down stop against the Packers, getting the ball back with an opportunity to run the clock out. However, a controversial fourth-down decision on that drive led to a turnover on downs, giving Green Bay one last gasp. The Packers got as far as the Eagles' 46 yard line, where Brandon McManus's potential game tying 64-yard field goal was shanked wide left, ending the game and sealing Philadelphia's victory.

With a 10–7 win, the Eagles improved to 7–2 and 2–0 against the NFC North.

==== Week 11: vs. Detroit Lions ====
Week 11: Detroit Lions at Philadelphia Eagles – Game summary

| Quarter | 1 | 2 | 3 | 4 | Total |
|---|---|---|---|---|---|
| Lions | 0 | 6 | 0 | 3 | **9** |
| **Eagles** | 3 | 10 | 0 | 3 | **16** |

at Lincoln Financial Field, Philadelphia, Pennsylvania

- Date: November 16
- Game time: 8:20 p.m. EST
- Game weather: Clear, 45 °F (7 °C)
- Game attendance: 69,879
- Referee: Alex Kemp
- TV announcers (NBC): Mike Tirico, Cris Collinsworth and Melissa Stark
- Recap, Game Book

Game information

**First quarter**

- PHI – Jake Elliott 27-yard field goal, 9:43. Eagles 3–0. **Drive: 4 plays, 2 yards, 1:25.**

**Second quarter**

- PHI – Jake Elliott 34-yard field goal, 6:02. Eagles 6–0. **Drive: 9 plays, 27 yards, 5:14.**
- DET – Jameson Williams 40-yard pass from Jared Goff (kick failed, wide right), 5:05. Tied 6–6. **Drive: 3 plays, 74 yards, 0:57.**
- PHI – Jalen Hurts 1-yard run (Jake Elliott kick), 0:16. Eagle 13–6. **Drive: 10 plays, 64 yards, 4:49.**

**Third quarter**

- No scoring plays.

**Fourth quarter**

- PHI – Jake Elliott 49-yard field goal, 10:15. Eagles 16–6. **Drive: 11 plays, 25 yards, 6:00.**
- DET – Jake Bates 54-yard field goal, 1:58. Eagles 16–9. **Drive: 4 plays, -7 yards, 0:59.**

**Top passers**

- DET – Jared Goff – 14/37, 255 yards, TD, INT
- PHI – Jalen Hurts – 14/28, 135 yards

**Top rushers**

- DET – Jahmyr Gibbs – 12 rushes, 39 yards
- PHI – Saquon Barkley – 26 rushes, 83 yards

**Top receivers**

- DET – Jahmyr Gibbs – 5 receptions, 107 yards
- PHI – A. J. Brown – 7 receptions, 49 yards

In another low scoring game, the Eagles’ defense stood strong for the second straight game, holding the Lions to nine points and stopping all five of Detroit’s fourth-down conversion attempts. After a late field goal by Lions kicker Jake Bates cut the Eagles’ lead to 16–9, Philadelphia appeared to come up short on a crucial third down during the ensuing drive. However, a controversial defensive pass interference penalty against Detroit cornerback Rock Ya-Sin granted the Eagles a fresh set of downs, allowing them to run out the clock and secure their fourth consecutive victory.

The win was the 675th lifetime win in franchise history.

==== Week 12: at Dallas Cowboys ====
Week 12: Philadelphia Eagles at Dallas Cowboys – Game summary

| Quarter | 1 | 2 | 3 | 4 | Total |
|---|---|---|---|---|---|
| Eagles | 14 | 7 | 0 | 0 | **21** |
| **Cowboys** | 0 | 7 | 7 | 10 | **24** |

at AT&T Stadium, Arlington, Texas

- Date: November 23
- Game time: 4:25 p.m. EST/3:25 p.m. CST
- Game weather: None (retractable roof closed)
- Game attendance: 93,068
- Referee: Bill Vinovich
- TV announcers (Fox): Kevin Burkhardt, Tom Brady, Erin Andrews and Tom Rinaldi
- Recap, Game Book

Game information

**First quarter**

- PHI – A. J. Brown 16-yard pass from Jalen Hurts (Jake Elliott kick), 8:41. Eagles 7–0. **Drive: 7 plays, 50 yards, 3:10.**
- PHI – Jalen Hurts 7-yard run (Jake Elliott kick), 0:57. Eagles 14–0. **Drive: 12 plays, 76 yards, 6:08.**

**Second quarter**

- PHI – Jalen Hurts 1-yard run (Jake Elliott kick), 11:32. Eagles 21–0. **Drive: 6 plays, 66 yards, 3:10.**
- DAL – George Pickens 1-yard pass from Dak Prescott (Brandon Aubrey kick), 0:21. Eagles 21–7. **Drive: 6 plays, 72 yards, 2:31.**

**Third quarter**

- DAL – Brevyn Spann-Ford 4-yard pass from Dak Prescott (Brandon Aubrey kick), 2:02. Eagles 21–14. **Drive: 7 plays, 89 yards, 2:16.**

**Fourth quarter**

- DAL – Dak Prescott 8-yard run (Brandon Aubrey kick), 11:40. Tied 21–21. **Drive: 3 plays, 54 yards, 1:29.**
- DAL – Brandon Aubrey 42-yard field goal, 0:00. Cowboys 24–21. **Drive: 9 plays, 49 yards, 1:35.**

**Top passers**

- PHI – Jalen Hurts – 27/39, 289 yards, TD
- DAL – Dak Prescott – 23/36, 354 yards, 2 TD, INT

**Top rushers**

- PHI – Jalen Hurts – 7 rushes, 33 yards, 2 TD
- DAL – Javonte Williams – 20 rushes, 87 yards

**Top receivers**

- PHI – A. J. Brown – 8 receptions, 110 yards, TD
- DAL – George Pickens – 9 receptions, 146 yards, TD

The Eagles blew a 21–0 lead and lost to the Cowboys, 24–21. While they had a chance late to march down the field and win the game following a goal line stand, Jalen Hurts took a sack that forced the Eagles to punt, allowing the Cowboys to kick a game winning field goal. With the giant collapse, the Eagles fell to 8–3. With the Rams' victory later that night, the Eagles slipped to the No. 2 seed in the NFC playoff picture.

The 21-point blown lead was the Eagles' largest since they blew a 21–0 lead against the Arizona Cardinals in the 1999 season.

==== Week 13: vs. Chicago Bears ====
Black Friday games

Week 13: Chicago Bears at Philadelphia Eagles – Game summary

| Quarter | 1 | 2 | 3 | 4 | Total |
|---|---|---|---|---|---|
| **Bears** | 7 | 3 | 0 | 14 | **24** |
| Eagles | 0 | 3 | 6 | 6 | **15** |

at Lincoln Financial Field, Philadelphia, Pennsylvania

- Date: November 28
- Game time: 3:00 p.m. EST
- Game weather: Sunny, 42 °F (6 °C)
- Game attendance: 69,879
- Referee: Carl Cheffers
- TV announcers (WTXF/Prime Video): Al Michaels, Kirk Herbstreit and Kaylee Hartung
- Recap, Game Book

Game information

**First quarter**

- CHI – D'Andre Swift 3-yard run (Cairo Santos kick), 1:31. Bears 7–0. **Drive: 11 plays, 78 yards, 5:26.**

**Second quarter**

- PHI – Jake Elliott 44-yard field goal, 13:04. Bears 7–3. **Drive: 7 plays, 39 yards, 3:27.**
- CHI – Cairo Santos 30-yard field goal, 6:44. Bears 10–3. **Drive: 15 plays, 68 yards, 6:20.**

**Third quarter**

- PHI – A. J. Brown 33-yard pass from Jalen Hurts (kick blocked), 8:05. Bears 10–9. **Drive: 5 plays, 92 yards, 1:54.**

**Fourth quarter**

- CHI – Kyle Monangai 4-yard run (Cairo Santos kick), 12:49. Bears 17–9. **Drive: 12 plays, 87 yards, 6:44.**
- CHI – Cole Kmet 28-yard pass from Caleb Williams (Cairo Santos kick), 6:19. Bears 24–9. **Drive: 8 plays, 63 yards, 4:56.**
- PHI – A. J. Brown 4-yard pass from Jalen Hurts (pass failed), 3:10. Bears 24–15. **Drive: 12 plays, 80 yards, 3:09.**

**Top passers**

- CHI – Caleb Williams – 17/36, 154 yards, TD, INT
- PHI – Jalen Hurts – 19/34, 230 yards, 2 TD, INT

**Top rushers**

- CHI – Kyle Monangai – 22 rushes, 130 yards, TD
- PHI – Saquon Barkley – 13 rushes, 56 yards

**Top receivers**

- CHI – Cole Kmet – 3 receptions, 36 yards, TD
- PHI – A. J. Brown – 10 receptions, 132 yards, 2 TD

The Eagles had an extremely disappointing game against the Caleb Williams-led Chicago Bears. After falling behind 10–3 at halftime, they scored a touchdown but had the extra point blocked to remain behind 10–9. After the defense forced an interception on Williams, Jalen Hurts fumbled, and the Bears scored two touchdowns to take a 24–9 lead. While the Eagles scored a touchdown late, the two-point conversion failed, and the final score was 24–15. The Eagles were dominated on the ground, as the Bears ran for 281 yards. With the upset loss, the Eagles fell to 8–4 and extended their losing streak to two games. The Eagles also finished 3–1 against the NFC North, snapping a 10-game winning streak against that division. They also fell to the #3 seed. This marked the Eagles' first loss to Chicago since 2011, snapping at a six game win streak against them.

==== Week 14: at Los Angeles Chargers ====
Week 14: Philadelphia Eagles at Los Angeles Chargers – Game summary

| Quarter | 1 | 2 | 3 | 4 | OT | Total |
|---|---|---|---|---|---|---|
| Eagles | 3 | 3 | 3 | 10 | 0 | **19** |
| **Chargers** | 7 | 3 | 3 | 6 | 3 | **22** |

at SoFi Stadium, Inglewood, California

- Date: December 8
- Game time: 8:15 p.m. EST/5:15 p.m. PST
- Game weather: Clear, 67 °F (19 °C) (fixed roof)
- Game attendance: 72,241
- Referee: Scott Novak
- TV announcers (ESPN/ABC): Joe Buck, Troy Aikman, Lisa Salters and Laura Rutledge
- Recap, Game Book

Game information

**First quarter**

- LAC – Omarion Hampton 4-yard pass from Justin Herbert (Cameron Dicker kick), 8:49. Chargers 7–0. **Drive: 6 plays, 80 yards, 2:49.**
- PHI – Jake Elliott 41-yard field goal, 3:22. Chargers 7–3. **Drive: 9 plays, 42 yards, 5:27.**

**Second quarter**

- LAC – Cameron Dicker 45-yard field goal, 4:55. Chargers 10–3. **Drive: 7 plays, 30 yards, 3:24.**
- PHI – Jake Elliott 30-yard field goal, 0:48. Chargers 10–6. **Drive: 11 plays, 46 yards, 3:43.**

**Third quarter**

- LAC – Cameron Dicker 34-yard field goal, 5:32. Chargers 13–6. **Drive: 16 plays, 51 yards, 9:28.**
- PHI – Jake Elliott 54-yard field goal, 3:22. Chargers 13–9. **Drive: 5 plays, 28 yards, 2:10.**

**Fourth quarter**

- PHI – Saquon Barkley 52-yard run (Jake Elliott kick), 14:51. Eagles 16–13. **Drive: 3 plays, 61 yards, 0:47.**
- LAC – Cameron Dicker 31-yard field goal, 7:26. Tied 16–16. **Drive: 7 plays, 22 yards, 3:37.**
- PHI – Jake Elliott 44-yard field goal, 2:16. Eagles 19–16. **Drive: 8 plays, 34 yards, 1:17.**
- LAC – Cameron Dicker 46-yard field goal, 0:08. Tied 19–19. **Drive: 11 plays, 43 yards, 2:08.**

**Overtime**

- LAC – Cameron Dicker 54-yard field goal, 6:24. Chargers 22–19. **Drive: 6 plays, 34 yards, 3:36.**

**Top passers**

- PHI – Jalen Hurts – 21/40, 240 yards, 4 INT
- LAC – Justin Herbert – 12/26, 139 yards, TD, INT

**Top rushers**

- PHI – Saquon Barkley – 20 rushes, 122 yards, TD
- LAC – Justin Herbert – 10 rushes, 66 yards

**Top receivers**

- PHI – A. J. Brown – 6 receptions, 100 yards
- LAC – Kimani Vidal – 1 reception, 60 yards

The game started off sloppy, with six turnovers in the second quarter. The Chargers led 10–6 at halftime as Jake Elliott’s field goal missed. After they both exchange field goals, Saquon Barkley scored a 52-yard touchdown. However, after holding the Chargers to a field goal, Jalen Hurts threw an interception, though the Chargers punted. They both exchanged field goals before the game went to overtime. The Chargers scored a field goal first, and while Hurts led the Eagles to the Chargers 17-yard line, he threw an interception to lose the game.

The Eagles' defense performed well, sacking Justin Herbert seven times, their most this season since Week 8 against the Giants. However, the offensive woes continued, as Hurts had five total turnovers, including two in one play, four of which were interceptions. He arguably had one of the worst outings of his career, finishing with 21-of-40 completions for 240 yards as well as those five turnovers for a career-low 31.3 passer rating and 27.3 QBR. With the loss, the Eagles dropped to 8–5, still a game and a half ahead of Dallas in the NFC East.

==== Week 15: vs. Las Vegas Raiders ====
Week 15: Las Vegas Raiders at Philadelphia Eagles – Game summary

| Quarter | 1 | 2 | 3 | 4 | Total |
|---|---|---|---|---|---|
| Raiders | 0 | 0 | 0 | 0 | **0** |
| **Eagles** | 7 | 10 | 7 | 7 | **31** |

at Lincoln Financial Field, Philadelphia, Pennsylvania

- Date: December 14
- Game time: 1:00 p.m. EST
- Game weather: Sunny, 30 °F (−1 °C)
- Game attendance: 69,879
- Referee: Clay Martin
- TV announcers (Fox): Joe Davis, Greg Olsen and Pam Oliver
- Recap, Game Book

Game information

**First quarter**

- PHI – Dallas Goedert 4-yard pass from Jalen Hurts (Jake Elliott kick), 7:51. Eagles 7–0. **Drive: 13 plays, 67 yards, 7:09.**

**Second quarter**

- PHI – Jake Elliott 27-yard field goal, 12:49. Eagles 10–0. **Drive: 7 plays, 59 yards, 3:27.**
- PHI – Saquon Barkley 2-yard run (Jake Elliott kick), 1:57. Eagles 17–0. **Drive: 11 plays, 70 yards, 6:07.**

**Third quarter**

- PHI – Dallas Goedert 4-yard pass from Jalen Hurts (Jake Elliott kick), 4:52. Eagles 24–0. **Drive: 10 plays, 73 yards, 6:27.**

**Fourth quarter**

- PHI – A. J. Brown 27-yard pass from Jalen Hurts (Jake Elliott kick), 14:54. Eagles 31–0. **Drive: 5 plays, 60 yards, 2:49.**

**Top passers**

- LV – Kenny Pickett – 15/25, 64 yards, INT
- PHI – Jalen Hurts – 12/15, 175 yards, 3 TD

**Top rushers**

- LV – Ashton Jeanty – 9 rushes, 35 yards
- PHI – Saquon Barkley – 22 rushes, 78 yards, TD

**Top receivers**

- LV – Brock Bowers – 6 receptions, 28 yards
- PHI – Dallas Goedert – 6 receptions, 70 yards, 2 TD

The Eagles rebounded by recording both their first shutout victory since defeating the Washington Redskins 24–0 in the 2018 season finale and their largest margin of victory against the Raiders with a 31-point differential. Brandon Graham recorded his first two sacks with the Eagles since returning from a brief retirement after the Super Bowl in late October. The Eagles also clinched their fifth consecutive winning season with their win.

The Eagles held the Las Vegas offense to 75 total yards, the fewest allowed by an Eagles defense since December 4, 1955, when they limited the Chicago Cardinals to 49 yards. The game lasted just two hours and 31 minutes, the fastest game in Eagles franchise history and the second fastest game on NFL record, behind a 1996 meeting between the Chargers and Colts that took 2 hours and 29 minutes to finish.

==== Week 16: at Washington Commanders ====
Week 16: Philadelphia Eagles at Washington Commanders – Game summary

| Quarter | 1 | 2 | 3 | 4 | Total |
|---|---|---|---|---|---|
| **Eagles** | 7 | 0 | 7 | 15 | **29** |
| Commanders | 3 | 7 | 0 | 8 | **18** |

at Northwest Stadium, Landover, Maryland

- Date: December 20
- Game time: 5:00 p.m. EST
- Game weather: Clear, 42 °F (6 °C)
- Game attendance: 64,582
- Referee: Craig Wrolstad
- TV announcers (Fox): Joe Davis, Greg Olsen and Pam Oliver
- Recap, Game Book

Game information

**First quarter**

- WAS – Jake Moody 20-yard field goal, 11:39. Commanders 3–0. **Drive: 8 plays, 24 yards, 3:16.**
- PHI – Devonta Smith 5-yard pass from Jalen Hurts (Jake Elliott kick), 2:37. Eagles 7–3. **Drive: 7 plays, 63 yards, 3:29.**

**Second quarter**

- WAS – Jacory Croskey-Merritt 1-yard run (Jake Moody kick), 3:40. Commanders 10–7. **Drive: 9 plays, 67 yards, 5:26.**

**Third quarter**

- PHI – Dallas Goedert 15-yard pass from Jalen Hurts (Jake Elliott kick), 3:27. Eagles 14–10. **Drive: 17 plays, 83 yards, 10:35.**

**Fourth quarter**

- PHI – Saquon Barkley 12-yard run (Jake Elliott kick), 11:33. Eagles 21–10. **Drive: 7 plays, 37 yards, 3:59.**
- PHI – Tank Bigsby 22-yard run (Saquon Barkley run), 4:26. Eagles 29–10. **Drive: 4 plays, 80 yards, 2:12.**
- WAS – Chris Rodriguez Jr. 3-yard run (Jeremy McNichols run), 1:10. Eagles 29–18. **Drive: 8 plays, 75 yards, 3:16.**

**Top passers**

- PHI – Jalen Hurts – 22/30, 185 yards, 2 TD
- WAS – Marcus Mariota – 7/14, 95 yards

**Top rushers**

- PHI – Saquon Barkley – 21 rushes, 132 yards, TD
- WAS – Chris Rodriguez Jr. – 15 rushes, 63 yards, TD

**Top receivers**

- PHI – A. J. Brown – 9 receptions, 95 yards
- WAS – Terry McLaurin – 3 receptions, 53 yards

The Eagles battled several miscues, including two missed field goals by kicker Jake Elliott and a fumble on the opening kickoff. However, they would rebound with a dominant second-half performance and win comfortably by a final score of 29–18. During the game, a brawl broke out involving two Washington defensive players, defensive lineman Javon Kinlaw and safety Quan Martin, and one Eagles player, offensive lineman Tyler Steen. All three were disqualified after being flagged for unnecessary roughness during the altercation.

With the victory, the Eagles clinched their second consecutive NFC East title, becoming the first team in the NFC East division to win back-to-back championships since the 2001–2004 Eagles. The gap between repeat division champions marked the longest such drought in NFL divisional history.

==== Week 17: at Buffalo Bills ====
Week 17: Philadelphia Eagles at Buffalo Bills – Game summary

| Quarter | 1 | 2 | 3 | 4 | Total |
|---|---|---|---|---|---|
| **Eagles** | 7 | 6 | 0 | 0 | **13** |
| Bills | 0 | 0 | 0 | 12 | **12** |

at Highmark Stadium, Orchard Park, New York

- Date: December 28
- Game time: 4:25 p.m. EST
- Game weather: Rain, 38 °F (3 °C)
- Game attendance: 71,105
- Referee: Ron Torbert
- TV announcers (Fox): Kevin Burkhardt, Tom Brady, Erin Andrews and Tom Rinaldi
- Recap, Game Book

Game information

**First quarter**

- PHI – Dallas Goedert 1-yard pass from Jalen Hurts (Jake Elliott kick), 0:35. Eagles 7–0. **Drive: 7 plays, 45 yards, 3:28.**

**Second quarter**

- PHI – Jake Elliott 47-yard field goal, 5:03. Eagles 10–0. **Drive: 13 plays, 48 yards, 5:54.**
- PHI – Jake Elliott 28-yard field goal, 0:08. Eagles 13–0. **Drive: 10 plays, 61 yards, 2:41.**

**Third quarter**

- No scoring plays

**Fourth quarter**

- BUF – Josh Allen 2-yard run (kick blocked), 5:11. Eagles 13–6. **Drive: 11 plays, 54 yards, 5:51.**
- BUF – Josh Allen 1-yard run (pass failed), 0:05. Eagles 13–12. **Drive: 13 plays, 83 yards, 3:16.**

**Top passers**

- PHI – Jalen Hurts – 13/27, 110 yards, TD
- BUF – Josh Allen – 23/35, 262 yards

**Top rushers**

- PHI – Saquon Barkley – 19 rushes, 68 yards
- BUF – James Cook – 20 rushes, 74 yards

**Top receivers**

- PHI – A. J. Brown – 5 receptions, 68 yards
- BUF – Brandin Cooks – 4 receptions, 101 yards

The Eagles jumped out to a 13–0 lead by halftime, thanks to two field goals and a Jalen Hurts touchdown to Dallas Goedert. The Eagles held this lead into the fourth quarter despite their offense stalling due to a goal line stand and forcing quarterback Josh Allen into a 19-yard loss on a sack on 3rd down. However, the Bills eventually scored a touchdown. Jalen Carter blocked the extra point to hold the score at 13–6. The Bills then scored another touchdown with five seconds left to narrow the score to 13–12. However, Philadelphia stopped the two-point conversion to hold onto the win.

With the win, the Eagles improved to 11–5, finishing 6–3 on the road and 3–2 against the AFC. The 49ers' win against Chicago allowed the Eagles to remain in contention for the No. 2 seed in the NFC.

Tight end Dallas Goedert caught his 11th touchdown of the season, setting a new Eagles single-season record for touchdowns by a tight end, surpassing Pete Retzlaff’s mark of 10 set in 1965.

==== Week 18: vs. Washington Commanders ====
Week 18: Washington Commanders at Philadelphia Eagles – Game summary

| Quarter | 1 | 2 | 3 | 4 | Total |
|---|---|---|---|---|---|
| **Commanders** | 0 | 10 | 0 | 14 | **24** |
| Eagles | 0 | 7 | 10 | 0 | **17** |

at Lincoln Financial Field, Philadelphia, Pennsylvania

- Date: January 4
- Game time: 4:25 p.m. EST
- Game weather: Clear, 35 °F (2 °C)
- Game attendance: 69,879
- Referee: Shawn Hochuli
- TV announcers (CBS): Kevin Harlan, Ross Tucker and Melanie Collins
- Recap, Game Book

Game information

**First quarter**

- No scoring plays

**Second quarter**

- PHI – Grant Calcaterra 15-yard pass from Tanner McKee (Jake Elliott kick), 13:37. Eagles 7–0. **Drive: 9 plays, 80 yards, 3:56.**
- WAS – Chris Rodriguez Jr. 1-yard run (Jake Moody kick), 9:03. Tied 7–7. **Drive: 8 plays, 65 yards, 4:34.**
- WAS – Jake Moody 56-yard field goal, 0:00. Commanders 10–7. **Drive: 5 plays, 33 yards, 0:48.**

**Third quarter**

- PHI – Tank Bigsby 2-yard run (Jake Elliott kick), 6:27. Eagles 14–10. **Drive: 8 plays, 28 yards, 4:25.**
- PHI – Jake Elliott 39-yard field goal, 0:30. Eagles 17–10. **Drive: 10 plays, 52 yards, 4:19.**

**Fourth quarter**

- WAS – John Bates 2-yard pass from Josh Johnson (Jake Moody kick), 9:35. Tied 17–17. **Drive: 9 plays, 65 yards, 5:55.**
- WAS – Josh Johnson 1-yard run (Jake Moody kick), 2:32. Commanders 24–17. **Drive: 9 plays, 77 yards, 6:05.**

**Top passers**

- WAS – Josh Johnson – 14/22, 131 yards, TD, INT
- PHI – Tanner McKee – 21/40, 241 yards, TD, INT

**Top rushers**

- WAS – Chris Rodriguez Jr. – 16 rushes, 65 yards, TD
- PHI – Tank Bigsby – 16 rushes, 75 yards, TD

**Top receivers**

- WAS – Terry McLaurin – 4 receptions, 57 yards
- PHI – Devonta Smith – 3 receptions, 52 yards

With a playoff spot and the division already clinched, the Eagles used this week to rest their starters.

The Eagles and Commanders played a back and forth game. The Commanders missed a 24-yard field goal, and the Eagles responded by scoring a touchdown, and the Commanders scored one soon after. However, both teams then exchanged interceptions, and the Commanders took a 10–7 lead into halftime off a 56-yard field goal by Jake Moody. The Eagles take a 17–10 lead after three quarters following a touchdown and field goal, but the Commanders took a 24–17 lead in the fourth quarter with two touchdowns. The Eagles' next two drives stalled, sealing the win for Washington.

With the loss, the Eagles finished 3–3 against the NFC East (5–3 at home) and clinched the #3 seed in the NFC. The Eagles missed the opportunity to claim the No. 2 seed, falling to the No. 3 seed instead, and were scheduled to face the San Francisco 49ers in the Wild Card Round.

=== Standings ===
==== Division ====
NFC East
| | W | L | T | PCT | DIV | CONF | PF | PA | STK |
|---|---|---|---|---|---|---|---|---|---|
| ^{(3)} Philadelphia Eagles | 11 | 6 | 0 | .647 | 3–3 | 8–4 | 379 | 325 | L1 |
| Dallas Cowboys | 7 | 9 | 1 | .441 | 4–2 | 4–7–1 | 471 | 511 | L1 |
| Washington Commanders | 5 | 12 | 0 | .294 | 3–3 | 3–9 | 356 | 451 | W1 |
| New York Giants | 4 | 13 | 0 | .235 | 2–4 | 2–10 | 381 | 439 | W2 |

==== Conference ====
NFC
| Seed | Team | Division | W | L | T | PCT | DIV | CONF | SOS | SOV | STK |
|---|---|---|---|---|---|---|---|---|---|---|---|
**Division leaders**
| 1 | Seattle Seahawks | West | 14 | 3 | 0 | .824 | 4–2 | 9–3 | .498 | .471 | W7 |
| 2 (Note: Chicago finished ahead of Philadelphia based on head-to-head victory.) | Chicago Bears | North | 11 | 6 | 0 | .647 | 2–4 | 7–5 | .458 | .406 | L2 |
| 3 | Philadelphia Eagles | East | 11 | 6 | 0 | .647 | 3–3 | 8–4 | .476 | .455 | L1 |
| 4 (Note: Carolina finished ahead of Tampa Bay and Atlanta based on head-to-head record (Carolina 3–1 to Tampa Bay 2–2 and Atlanta 1–3).) | Carolina Panthers | South | 8 | 9 | 0 | .471 | 3–3 | 6–6 | .522 | .463 | L2 |
**Wild cards**
| 5 (Note: LA Rams finished ahead of San Francisco based on common games (LA Rams 9–3 to San Francisco 8–4 against: Arizona, Atlanta, Carolina, Houston, Indianapolis, Jacksonville, New Orleans, Seattle, Tampa Bay and Tennessee).) | Los Angeles Rams | West | 12 | 5 | 0 | .706 | 4–2 | 7–5 | .526 | .485 | W1 |
| 6 | San Francisco 49ers | West | 12 | 5 | 0 | .706 | 4–2 | 9–3 | .498 | .417 | L1 |
| 7 | Green Bay Packers | North | 9 | 7 | 1 | .559 | 4–2 | 7–4–1 | .483 | .431 | L4 |
**Did not qualify for the postseason**
| 8 (Note: Minnesota finished ahead of Detroit based on head-to-head sweep.) | Minnesota Vikings | North | 9 | 8 | 0 | .529 | 4–2 | 7–5 | .514 | .431 | W5 |
| 9 | Detroit Lions | North | 9 | 8 | 0 | .529 | 2–4 | 6–6 | .490 | .428 | W1 |
| 10 (Note: Tampa Bay finished ahead of Atlanta based on common games (Tampa Bay 6–6 to Atlanta 5–7 against: Arizona, Buffalo, Carolina, LA Rams, Miami, New England, New Orleans, NY Jets, San Francisco and Seattle).) | Tampa Bay Buccaneers | South | 8 | 9 | 0 | .471 | 3–3 | 6–6 | .529 | .485 | W1 |
| 11 | Atlanta Falcons | South | 8 | 9 | 0 | .471 | 3–3 | 7–5 | .495 | .449 | W4 |
| 12 | Dallas Cowboys | East | 7 | 9 | 1 | .441 | 4–2 | 4–7–1 | .438 | .311 | L1 |
| 13 | New Orleans Saints | South | 6 | 11 | 0 | .353 | 3–3 | 4–8 | .495 | .333 | L1 |
| 14 | Washington Commanders | East | 5 | 12 | 0 | .294 | 3–3 | 3–9 | .507 | .388 | W1 |
| 15 | New York Giants | East | 4 | 13 | 0 | .235 | 2–4 | 2–10 | .524 | .478 | W2 |
| 16 | Arizona Cardinals | West | 3 | 14 | 0 | .176 | 0–6 | 3–9 | .571 | .422 | L9 |
**Tiebreakers** (Note: When breaking ties for three or more teams under the NFL's rules, they are first broken within divisions, then comparing only the highest ranked remaining team from each division.)

== Postseason ==
=== Schedule ===
| Round | Date | Opponent (seed) | Result | Record | Venue | Sources |
|---|---|---|---|---|---|---|
| Wild Card | January 11 | San Francisco 49ers (6) | L 19–23 | 0–1 | Lincoln Financial Field | Recap |

=== Game summaries ===
==== NFC Wild Card Playoffs: vs. (6) San Francisco 49ers ====
NFC Wild Card Playoffs: (6) San Francisco 49ers at (3) Philadelphia Eagles – Game summary

| Quarter | 1 | 2 | 3 | 4 | Total |
|---|---|---|---|---|---|
| 49ers | 7 | 3 | 0 | 13 | 23 |
| Eagles | 6 | 7 | 3 | 3 | 19 |

at Lincoln Financial Field, Philadelphia, Pennsylvania

- Date: January 11, 2026
- Game time: 4:40 p.m. EST
- Game weather: Cloudy, 46 °F (8 °C)
- Game attendance: 69,879
- Referee: Alan Eck
- TV announcers (Fox): Kevin Burkhardt, Tom Brady, Erin Andrews, and Tom Rinaldi
- Recap, Game Book

Game information

First quarter

- SF – Demarcus Robinson 2-yard pass from Brock Purdy (Eddy Pineiro kick), 11:51. 49ers 7–0. Drive: 6 plays, 76 yards, 3:09.
- PHI – Dallas Goedert 1-yard run (kick failed), 6:16. 49ers 7–6. Drive: 10 plays, 63 yards, 5:35.

Second quarter

- PHI – Dallas Goedert 9-yard pass from Jalen Hurts (Jake Elliott kick), 6:08. Eagles 13–7. Drive: 16 plays, 94 yards, 9:00.
- SF – Eddy Pineiro 36-yard field goal, 2:50. Eagles 13–10. Drive: 6 plays, 59 yards, 3:18.

Third quarter

- PHI – Jake Elliott 41-yard field goal, 2:11. Eagles 16–10. Drive: 10 plays, 23 yards, 5:11.

Fourth quarter

- SF – Christian McCaffrey 29-yard pass from Jauan Jennings (Eddy Pineiro kick), 14:52. 49ers 17–16. Drive: 5 plays, 67 yards, 2:19.
- PHI – Jake Elliott 33-yard field goal, 8:00. Eagles 19–17. Drive: 8 plays, 47 yards, 3:55.
- SF – Christian McCaffrey 4-yard pass from Brock Purdy (kick failed), 2:54. 49ers 23–19. Drive: 10 plays, 66 yards, 5:06.

Top passers

- SF – Brock Purdy – 18/31, 262 yards, 2 TD, 2 INT
- PHI – Jalen Hurts – 20/35, 168 yards, TD

Top rushers

- SF – Christian McCaffrey – 15 rushes, 48 yards
- PHI – Saquon Barkley – 26 rushes, 106 yards

Top receivers

- SF – Demarcus Robinson – 6 receptions, 111 yards, TD
- PHI – Devonta Smith – 8 receptions, 70 yards

Demarcus Robinson starred on the first possession of the game, catching a 61-yard pass and run from Brock Purdy and scoring a 2-yard goal line touchdown, to take the early 7–0 lead. The Eagles answered on their first possession by virtue of a Dallas Goedert end-around touchdown from the 1-yard line, but Jake Elliott's extra-point hit the left upright. With 6:08 left in the second quarter, the referees picked up an illegal block downfield flag after Jalen Hurts found Goedert on a 9-yard touchdown pass to take a 13–7 lead. Star tight end George Kittle was carted off the field on the 49ers’ next possession, which later revealed to be an Achilles tear. The 6-play 49ers drive ended on an Eddy Piñeiro 36-yard field goal. On the last play of the half without any timeouts, Purdy fumbled the ball out of bounds before Piñeiro had a chance to attempt a long field, thus the clock ran off 10 seconds and the score remained 13–10 at halftime. Earlier in the second quarter, head coach Nick Sirianni and receiver A. J. Brown had to be separated on the sidelines after Sirianni confronted Brown for dropping a pass.

The third quarter saw a combined 106 yards from both offenses; the Eagles would extend their lead to six on a Jake Elliot 41-yards field goal with 2:35 left in the quarter. The 49ers scored a touchdown at the start of the fourth quarter on an end-around pass from wide receiver Jauan Jennings to Christian McCaffrey for 29 yards to reclaim the lead, 17–16. Quinyon Mitchell picked off Purdy for the second time in the game at 12:04 in the fourth quarter. The Eagles then went on a 8-play, 47-yard drive that was stalled in the red zone, with the team having to settle for a 33-yard field goal from Elliot to retake the lead at 19–17. The 49ers quickly responded with a 10-play, 66-yard drive that ended with a Purdy to McCaffrey 4-yard touchdown pass with 2:54 remaining in the game to retake a 23–19 lead after Piñeiro missed the extra point. Hurts led Philadelphia down the field, including a 4th-and-5 conversion on a 15-yard pass to Goedert on the Eagles own 40-yard line, but the offense would grind to a halt as the drive stalled inside San Francisco’s half of the field. Their quest for back-to-back championships ended after a turnover on downs at San Francisco’s 21-yard line. The 49ers then ran the clock out to seal the upset victory and hand the Eagles their first home playoff loss since 2019, ending a five-game home playoff win streak. This also marked the Eagles first playoff loss to the 49ers since 1996. The Eagles also became the first defending Super Bowl champion since the 2019 New England Patriots to be eliminated in the Wild Card Round.
