= Hollin =

Hollin may refer to:

- Ilex aquifolium, a European species of holly called Hollin in Scotland.
- Hollin a land south of Rivendell in the fictional world of Middle-earth

Given name

- Hollin Pierce (born 2001), American football player
