= Charley Hughlett =

American football player (born 1990)

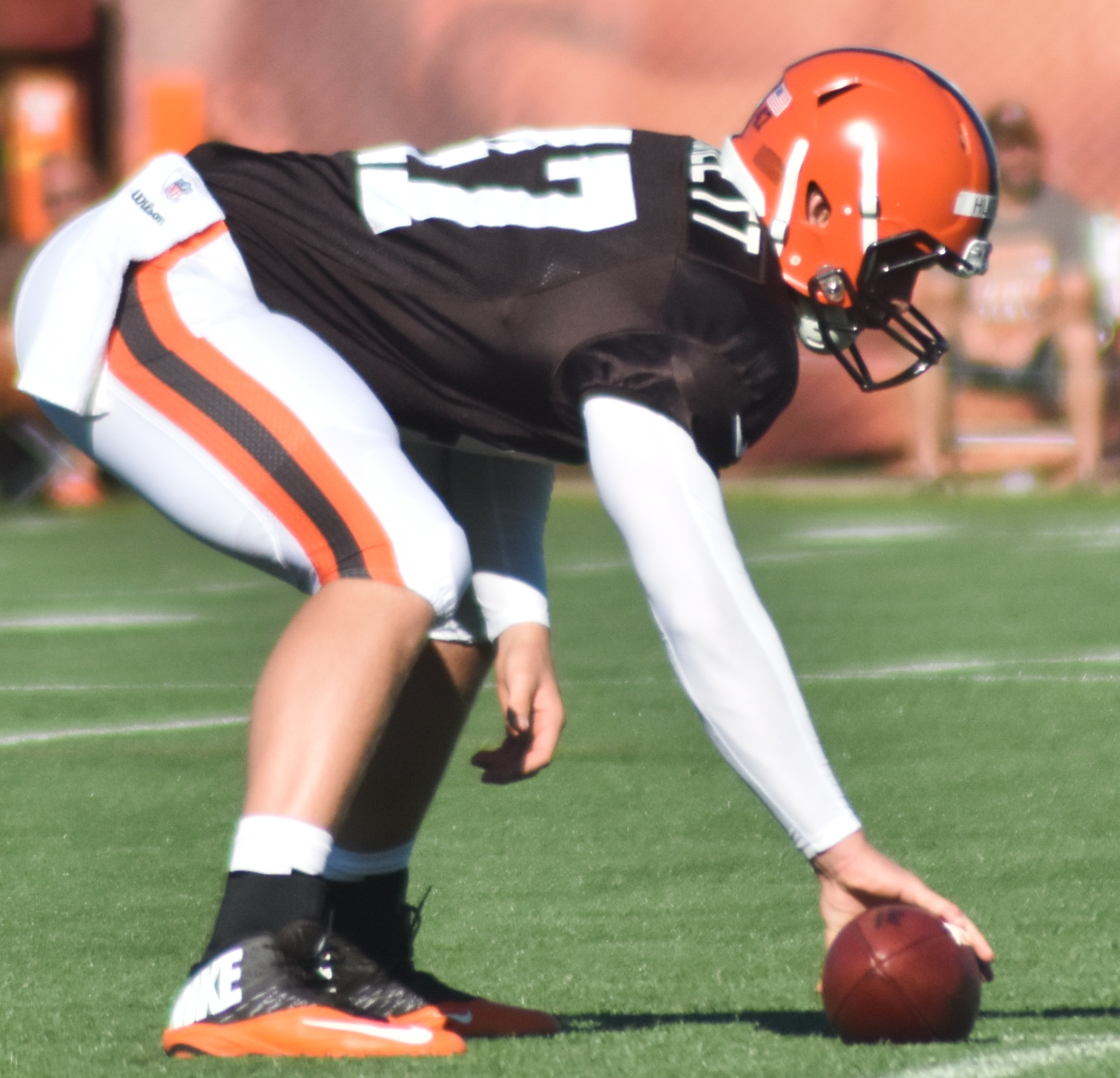
- Hughlett with the Cleveland Browns in 2015

Profile
- Position: Long snapper

Personal information
- Born: May 16, 1990 (age 36); Tampa, Florida, U.S.
- Listed height: 6 ft 4 in (1.93 m)
- Listed weight: 251 lb (114 kg)

Career information
- High school: Hillsborough (Tampa)
- College: UCF (2008–2011)
- NFL draft: 2012: undrafted

Career history
- Dallas Cowboys (2012–2013)*; New England Patriots (2014)*; Jacksonville Jaguars (2014)*; New England Patriots (2014)*; Cleveland Browns (2014)*; New England Patriots (2014)*; Kansas City Chiefs (2014)*; Cleveland Browns (2014–2024); Philadelphia Eagles (2025)
- * Offseason or practice squad member only

Awards and highlights
- 2× second-team All-CUSA (2010, 2011)

Career NFL statistics as of 2025
- Games played: 160
- Total tackles: 27
- Stats at Pro Football Reference

Robert Charles Hughlett (born May 16, 1990) is an American professional football long snapper. He played college football for the UCF Knights and was signed by the Dallas Cowboys in 2012 as an undrafted free agent.

== Early life ==
Hughlett attended Hillsborough High School in Tampa, Florida, where he lettered all four years at tight end and center. He graduated in the Class of 2008. As a junior, he was named second-team All-conference. As a senior, he received first-team All-conference honors.

During his high school career, the Terriers earned regional champion honors in 2004 as well as district titles in 2005 and 2006. Hughlett also earned varsity letters in track and wrestling. He was also selected for the National Football Foundation Scholar-Athlete Award.

== College career ==
In 2008, he accepted a football scholarship from the University of Central Florida. He also was recruited by The Citadel, South Florida, Holy Cross, and Brown. He played long snapper all four years.

As a freshman, he earned Conference USA All-Freshman Team honors as a long snapper, after appearing in 12 games, including 3 tackles on special teams. As a sophomore, he played in all 13 of the Knights games.

As a junior, Hughlett appeared in all 14 of the Knights games en route to earning All-Conference USA second-team honors. As a senior, he played in all 12 games and again earned All-Conference USA second-team honors.

== Professional career ==
Pre-draft measurables
| Height | Weight | 40-yard dash | 10-yard split | 20-yard split | 20-yard shuttle | Three-cone drill | Vertical jump | Broad jump | Bench press |
|---|---|---|---|---|---|---|---|---|---|
| 6 ft 3 3/4 in (1.92 m) | 246 lb (112 kg) | 4.99 s | 1.70 s | 2.85 s | 4.34 s | 7.06 s | 32.0 in (0.81 m) | 9 ft 7 in (2.92 m) | 22 reps |
All values from Pro Day

=== Dallas Cowboys ===
Hughlett was signed as an undrafted free agent by the Dallas Cowboys after the 2012 NFL draft on April 30, 2012. On August 27, he was waived after not being able to pass stalwart starter L.P. Ladouceur on the depth chart. On January 7, 2013, Hughlett was re-signed. On May 29, he was released by the Cowboys.

=== New England Patriots ===
On March 19, 2014, Hughlett signed as a free agent with the New England Patriots. On May 15, he was released by the Patriots.

=== Jacksonville Jaguars ===
On June 19, 2014, Hughlett was signed by the Jacksonville Jaguars. On August 24, he was released by Jacksonville.

=== New England Patriots (second stint) ===
On September 1, 2014, Hughlett was signed to the New England Patriots' practice squad, only to be released two days later.

=== Cleveland Browns ===
On September 30, 2014, Hughlett was signed to the Cleveland Browns' practice squad, but was cut a week later.

=== New England Patriots (third stint) ===
On November 26, 2014, Hughlett was re-signed to the New England Patriots' practice squad; he was released two days later.

=== Kansas City Chiefs ===
On December 16, 2014, Hughlett was signed to the Kansas City Chiefs' practice squad.

=== Cleveland Browns (second stint) ===
On December 24, 2014, Hughlett was signed to the Browns active roster off the Chiefs' practice squad, to compete with starter Christian Yount.

In 2015, he passed Yount on the depth chart. He played in all 16 games and handling all long-snapping duties. On February 16, 2017, Hughlett signed a six-year contract extension with the Browns, which at the time made him the league's highest-paid long snapper. On October 3, 2021, he played in his 100th consecutive game with the Browns, becoming only the third player (Joe Thomas and Phil Dawson) to accomplish this feat since the franchise returned to the NFL in 1999.

On October 28, 2022, Hughlett signed a four-year contract extension with the Browns.

On February 24, 2025, Hughlett was released by the Browns.

=== Philadelphia Eagles ===
On March 14, 2025, Hughlett signed a one-year contract with the Philadelphia Eagles. On September 30, Hughlett was placed on injured reserve due to a core muscle injury, and was temporarily replaced by Cal Adomitis. He was activated on December 12, ahead of the team's Week 15 matchup against the Las Vegas Raiders. Hughlett was released by the Eagles on December 31, and was subsequently re-signed to the practice squad.
