= Jihaad Campbell =

American football player (born 2004)

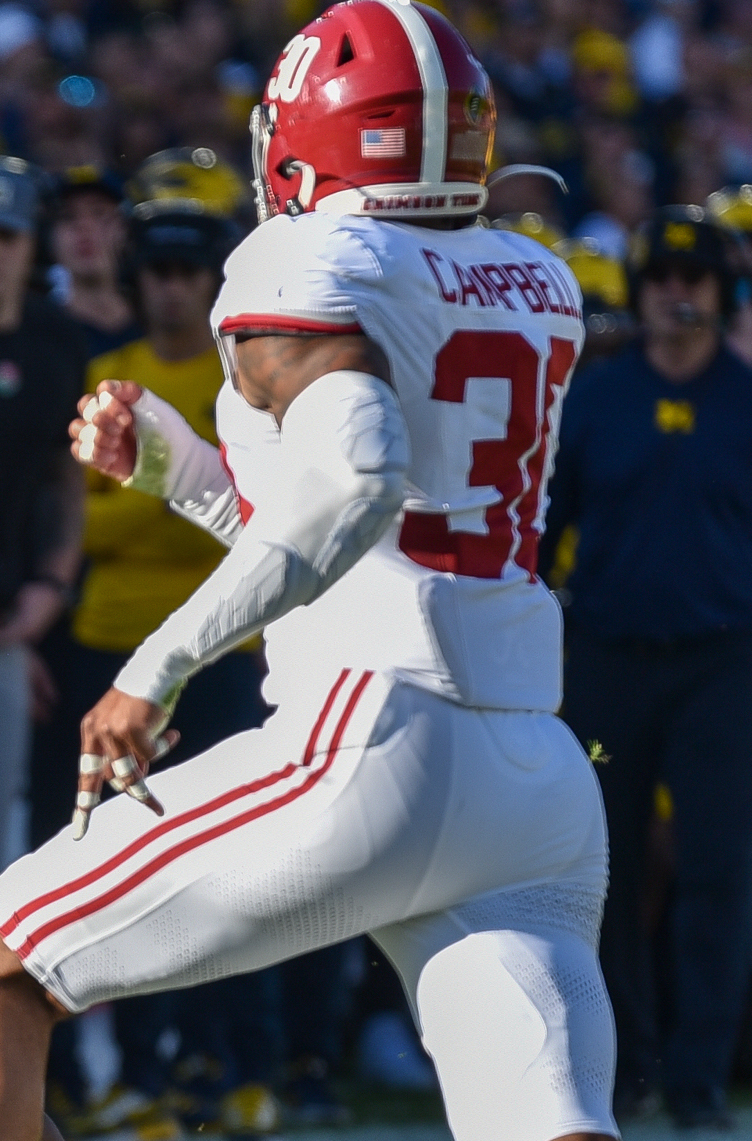
- Campbell with the Alabama Crimson Tide in 2024

No. 11 – Philadelphia Eagles
- Position: Linebacker
- Roster status: Active

Personal information
- Born: February 24, 2004 (age 22); Erial, New Jersey, U.S.
- Listed height: 6 ft 3 in (1.91 m)
- Listed weight: 235 lb (107 kg)

Career information
- High school: Timber Creek (Erial) (2018–2020); IMG Academy (Bradenton, Florida) (2021)
- College: Alabama (2022–2024)
- NFL draft: 2025: 1st round, 31st overall pick

Career history
- Philadelphia Eagles (2025–present)

Awards and highlights
- PFWA All-Rookie Team (2025); First-team All-SEC (2024)

Career NFL statistics as of Week 7, 2026
- Total tackles: 129
- Sacks: 1
- Forced fumbles: 2
- Pass deflections: 3
- Fumble recoveries: 1
- Interceptions: 1
- Stats at Pro Football Reference

Jihaad Markese Campbell (born February 24, 2004) is an American professional football linebacker for the Philadelphia Eagles of the National Football League (NFL). He played college football for the Alabama Crimson Tide and was selected by the Eagles in the first round of the 2025 NFL draft.

== Early life ==
Campbell was born on February 24, 2004. He attended Timber Creek Regional High School in Erial, New Jersey for three years before transferring to IMG Academy in Bradenton, Florida. As a senior, he played both wide receiver and defensive end, hauling in 15 receptions for 249 yards and two touchdowns and tallying 45 tackles and seven sacks. On August 4, 2020, the 16 year old Campbell received his top offer to play football at Clemson, where he initially committed to play college football. However, he later flipped his commitment to play football for the University of Alabama.

== College career ==
As a freshman in 2022, Campbell notched one tackle on the season. In week 4 of the 2023 season, he recorded seven tackles in a win over Ole Miss. In the following week, in his first start, Campbell tallied 14 tackles, with one going for a loss, and an interception, in a win over Mississippi State. In week 8, he notched ten tackles and recovered a fumble which he returned 24 yards for a touchdown in a 34–20 win over Tennessee.

== Professional career ==
Pre-draft measurables
Height	Weight	Arm length	Hand span	Wingspan	40-yard dash	10-yard split	20-yard split	Broad jump
6 ft 2 7/8 in (1.90 m)	235 lb (107 kg)	32 1/2 in (0.83 m)	10 1/2 in (0.27 m)	6 ft 8 in (2.03 m)	4.52 s	1.53 s	2.66 s	10 ft 7 in (3.23 m)
All values from NFL Combine

Campbell was selected by the Philadelphia Eagles with the 31st overall pick in the first round of the 2025 NFL draft. For the Eagles to select Campbell, they traded with the Kansas City Chiefs the 32nd pick (that the Chiefs used on Josh Simmons) and the 164th pick (that the Pittsburgh Steelers used on Yahya Black). He played in all 17 games (including 10 starts) for Philadelphia during his rookie campaign, recording one interception, three pass deflections, one forced fumble, one fumble recovery, and 80 combined tackles. It was later announced that Campbell had played through a shoulder injury which required surgery after the season.

== NFL career statistics ==
Legend
**Bold**	Career high

=== Regular season ===
Year	Team	Games		Tackles					Interceptions				Fumbles			
Year	Team	GP	GS	Cmb	Solo	Ast	Sck	TFL	PD	Int	Yds	TD	FF	FR	Yds	TD
2025	PHI	17	10	80	44	36	0.0	2	3	1	0	0	1	1	0	0
2026	PHI	1	1	9	5	4	1.0	1	0	0	0	0	0	0	0	0
Career		18	11	89	49	40	1.0	3	3	1	0	0	1	1	0	0

== Personal life ==
Campbell is Muslim, and has openly bonded with his teammates through Islam, such as fellow Muslim Alabama linebacker Chris Braswell. His parents, Jabari and Jamillah, named him Jihaad, an Arabic word meaning "struggle" and "effort". During his time at Alabama he was an active member at the Islamic Center of Tuscaloosa.
