= Parry Nickerson =

American football player (born 1994)

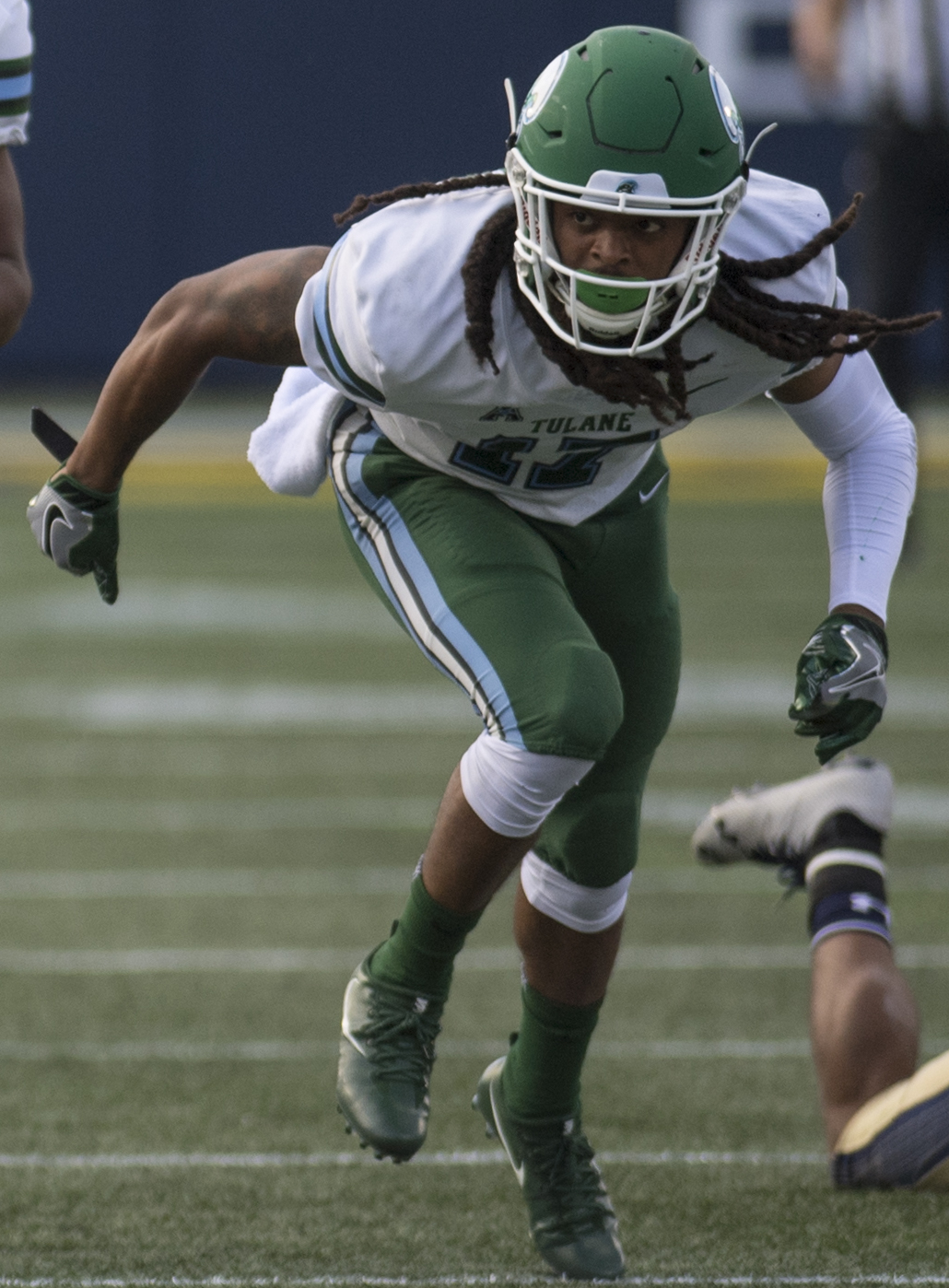
- Nickerson with the Tulane Green Wave in 2017

Profile
- Position: Cornerback

Personal information
- Born: October 11, 1994 (age 32); New Orleans, Louisiana, U.S.
- Listed height: 5 ft 10 in (1.78 m)
- Listed weight: 182 lb (83 kg)

Career information
- High school: West Jefferson (Harvey, Louisiana)
- College: Tulane (2013–2017)
- NFL draft: 2018: 6th round, 179th overall pick

Career history
- New York Jets (2018); Seattle Seahawks (2019); Jacksonville Jaguars (2019); Green Bay Packers (2020); Minnesota Vikings (2021–2022); Miami Dolphins (2023); Philadelphia Eagles (2024–2025)

Awards and highlights
- Super Bowl champion (LIX); First-team All-AAC (2017); Second-team All-AAC (2016)

Career NFL statistics as of 2025
- Total tackles: 35
- Pass deflections: 1
- Stats at Pro Football Reference

Parry Nickerson (born October 11, 1994) is an American professional football cornerback. He played college football for the Tulane Green Wave.

== College career ==
Nickerson played college football at Tulane University. During his first season he suffered a bad knee injury that was career threatening. However, he was able to make a comeback and play in the next 48 games with 46 starts. Over this time, Nickerson totalled 16 interceptions with 31 pass deflections for the Green Wave. He was considered a Jim Thorpe Award semi-finalist during his senior season in 2017. For his senior season, he concluded the season with 55 total tackles, 2 tackles for loss, 6 interceptions, and 8 pass deflections.

== Professional career ==
=== Pre-draft ===
At the 2018 NFL Combine, Nickerson ran a 4.32-second 40-yard dash, which tied two other cornerbacks, LSU's Donte Jackson and Ohio State's Denzel Ward for the fastest time.

Pre-draft measurables
Height	Weight	Arm length	Hand span	Wingspan	40-yard dash	10-yard split	20-yard split	20-yard shuttle	Three-cone drill	Vertical jump	Broad jump	Bench press
5 ft 10 3/8 in (1.79 m)	182 lb (83 kg)	30 1/4 in (0.77 m)	8 1/4 in (0.21 m)	6 ft 0 3/4 in (1.85 m)	4.32 s	1.50 s	2.54 s	4.29 s	7.31 s	33.5 in (0.85 m)	10 ft 0 in (3.05 m)	15 reps
All values from NFL Combine/Pro Day

=== New York Jets ===
Nickerson was selected by the New York Jets in the sixth round (179th overall) of the 2018 NFL draft.

Nickerson made his NFL debut on September 10, 2018, in a 48–17 win against the Detroit Lions, recording one tackle and receiving a taunting penalty on his first career play on defense. He made his first career start on October 14, 2018, in a 42–34 win over the Indianapolis Colts, making four tackles and deflecting a pass.

=== Seattle Seahawks ===
On August 31, 2019, Nickerson was traded to the Seattle Seahawks in exchange for a conditional 2021 seventh-round pick. He was waived on September 10, 2019, and re-signed to the practice squad. He was released on October 15.

=== Jacksonville Jaguars ===
On October 17, 2019, Nickerson was signed by the Jacksonville Jaguars. He was waived on October 21, 2019, and re-signed to the practice squad. He was promoted to the active roster on December 3, 2019.

Nickerson was placed on the reserve/COVID-19 list by the Jaguars on July 30, 2020, and was activated six days later. He was waived on September 5, 2020.

=== Green Bay Packers ===
Nickerson signed with the Green Bay Packers on September 7, 2020. He was placed on injured reserve on October 20, 2020. He was designated to return from injured reserve on January 20, 2021, and began practicing with the team again, but he was not activated before the end of the postseason.

=== Minnesota Vikings ===
On May 17, 2021, Nickerson signed with the Minnesota Vikings. He was waived on August 31, and re-signed to the practice squad the next day. Nickerson signed a reserve/future contract with the Vikings on January 10, 2022.

Nickerson was released by the Vikings on August 30, 2022. He was signed to the practice squad one day later. Nickerson was released on September 27. He was re-signed on November 15.

=== Miami Dolphins ===
On August 6, 2023, Nickerson signed with the Miami Dolphins. On October 28, following the activation of Jalen Ramsey, Nickerson was released by the Dolphins. He was re-signed to the practice squad two days later. He was not signed to a reserve/future contract after the season and thus became a free agent upon the expiration of his practice squad contract.

=== Philadelphia Eagles ===
On June 7, 2024, Nickerson signed with the Philadelphia Eagles. He was released on August 26. Nickerson was signed to the practice squad on October 15. Nickerson won a Super Bowl championship when the Eagles defeated the Kansas City Chiefs 40–22 in Super Bowl LIX. He signed a reserve/future contract with Philadelphia on February 14, 2025.

On August 26, 2025, Nickerson was released by the Eagles as part of final roster cuts and re-signed to the practice squad the next day. On September 24, he was signed to the active roster. On October 27, Nickerson was released ahead of the return of Jakorian Bennett from injured reserve, but then re-signed to the Eagles' practice squad the following day.

== NFL career statistics ==
=== Regular season ===
Year	Team	Games		Tackles					Interceptions						Fumbles	
Year	Team	GP	GS	Comb	Total	Ast	Sck	Sfty	PD	Int	Yds	Avg	Lng	TDs	FF	FR
2018	NYJ	16	2	21	18	3	0.0	0	1	0	0	0.0	0	0	0	0
2019	JAX	4	1	6	4	2	0.0	0	0	0	0	0.0	0	0	0	0
2020	GB	1	0	0	0	0	0.0	0	0	0	0	0.0	0	0	0	0
2021	MIN	4	0	1	1	0	0.0	0	0	0	0	0.0	0	0	0	0
2023	MIA	5	0	5	5	0	0.0	0	0	0	0	0.0	0	0	0	0
2025	PHI	5	0	2	2	0	0.0	0	0	0	0	0.0	0	0	0	0
Career		35	3	35	30	5	0.0	0	1	0	0	0.0	0	0	0	0
Source: NFL.com
