= Parks Frazier =

American football coach (born 1991)

Philadelphia Eagles
- Title: Quarterbacks coach

Personal information
- Born: November 20, 1991 (age 34); Corinth, Mississippi, U.S.

Career information
- Position: Quarterback
- High school: Corinth (MS)
- College: Ole Miss (2010); Northeast Mississippi (2011); Murray State (2012–2014)

Career history
- Samford (2015) Defensive quality control coach; Middle Tennessee State (2015) Defensive quality control coach; Arkansas State (2016–2017) Graduate assistant; Indianapolis Colts (2018–2022); Assistant to the head coach (2018–2019); Offensive quality control coach (2020); Assistant quarterbacks coach (2021–2022); Interim offensive coordinator (2022); Carolina Panthers (2023) Passing game coordinator; Miami Dolphins (2024) Offensive assistant; Philadelphia Eagles (2025–present); Passing game coordinator (2025); Quarterbacks coach (2026–present)

Randall Parks Frazier II (born November 20, 1991) is an American professional football coach who is the quarterbacks coach for the Philadelphia Eagles of the National Football League (NFL). He played college football at Murray State.

Frazier previously served as an assistant coach for the Miami Dolphins, Carolina Panthers, Indianapolis Colts, Arkansas State University, Middle Tennessee State University, and Samford University.

== Coaching career ==
Frazier began his coaching career at Samford as a defensive quality control during the 2015 spring season. He spent the 2015 season at Middle Tennessee State as a defensive intern before joining the coaching staff at Arkansas State as a graduate assistant.

=== Indianapolis Colts ===
At the recommendation of his former college teammate, Frazier was hired by the Indianapolis Colts as the assistant to head coach Frank Reich in 2018. He was an offensive quality control coach in 2020 before being promoted to assistant quarterbacks coach in 2021. In 2022, he became the offensive play caller for the Colts after Jeff Saturday was hired as the interim head coach following Reich's firing.

=== Carolina Panthers ===
On February 15, 2023, Frazier was hired by the Carolina Panthers to serve as the team's passing game coordinator.

=== Miami Dolphins ===
Frazier joined the Miami Dolphins as an offensive assistant for the 2024 season.

=== Philadelphia Eagles ===
On February 19, 2025, Frazier was hired by the Philadelphia Eagles to serve as the team's passing game coordinator. Following the season, offensive coordinator Kevin Patullo was relieved of his duties and Frazier was not retained by new offensive coordinator Sean Mannion, who opted to hire Josh Grizzard in the role. On February 17, 2026, the Eagles announced that Frazier would be reassigned as the team's new quarterbacks coach.

== Personal life ==
Frazier is married to Caroline Cann, a former reporter for the Colts' website. The couple were wed by Frank Reich.

Frazier's house was damaged by 77 rounds in a shooting in 2019. No residents were home and no injuries were reported. The targeting of Frazier's house was later ruled a mistake.
