= Marcus Epps (American football) =

American football player (born 1996)

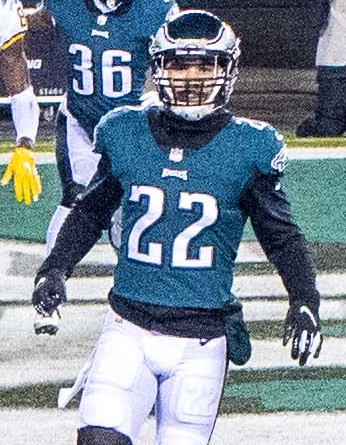
- Epps with the Philadelphia Eagles in 2021

No. 29 – Philadelphia Eagles
- Position: Safety
- Roster status: Active

Personal information
- Born: January 27, 1996 (age 30); Burbank, California, U.S.
- Listed height: 6 ft 0 in (1.83 m)
- Listed weight: 198 lb (90 kg)

Career information
- High school: Edison (Huntington Beach, California)
- College: Wyoming (2014–2018)
- NFL draft: 2019: 6th round, 191st overall pick

Career history
- Minnesota Vikings (2019); Philadelphia Eagles (2019–2022); Las Vegas Raiders (2023–2024); New England Patriots (2025)*; Philadelphia Eagles (2025–present)
- * Offseason or practice squad member only

Career NFL statistics as of Week 3, 2026
- Total tackles: 329
- Forced fumbles: 2
- Fumble recoveries: 1
- Pass deflections: 18
- Interceptions: 3
- Stats at Pro Football Reference

Marcus Epps (born January 27, 1996) is an American professional football safety for the Philadelphia Eagles of the National Football League (NFL). He played college football for the Wyoming Cowboys.

== Professional career ==
Pre-draft measurables
Height	Weight	Arm length	Hand span	Wingspan	40-yard dash	10-yard split	20-yard split	20-yard shuttle	Three-cone drill	Vertical jump	Broad jump	Bench press
5 ft 11 5/8 in (1.82 m)	191 lb (87 kg)	29 1/2 in (0.75 m)	10 in (0.25 m)	5 ft 11 1/4 in (1.81 m)	4.55 s	1.58 s	2.71 s	4.07 s	6.77 s	38.5 in (0.98 m)	10 ft 4 in (3.15 m)	17 reps
All values from Pro Day

=== Minnesota Vikings ===
Epps was selected by the Minnesota Vikings in the sixth round, 191st overall, of the 2019 NFL draft. He was waived on November 6, 2019.

=== Philadelphia Eagles ===
On November 7, 2019, Epps was claimed off waivers by the Philadelphia Eagles.

Epps was placed on the reserve/COVID-19 list by the team on November 5, 2020, and activated on November 18. In Week 15 against the Arizona Cardinals, Epps recorded his first career interception of a pass thrown by Kyler Murray during the 33–26 loss.

Epps was placed on the COVID-19 list on January 3, 2022. He was activated one week later on January 10, missing just one game where the Eagles did not play their starters.

In 2022, Epps reached Super Bowl LVII. In the Super Bowl, Epps record six tackles but the Eagles lost 38–35 to the Kansas City Chiefs.

=== Las Vegas Raiders ===
On March 16, 2023, Epps signed a two-year contract with the Las Vegas Raiders. He started all 17 games in 2023, recording 66 tackles, three passes defensed, a forced fumble and recovery.

Epps entered the 2024 season as a starting safety for the Raiders. He suffered a torn ACL in Week 3 and was ruled out the rest of the season.

=== New England Patriots ===
On March 14, 2025, Epps signed a one-year, $1.4 million contract with the New England Patriots. He was waived on August 26 as part of final roster cuts.

=== Philadelphia Eagles (second stint) ===
On August 28, 2025, Epps signed with the Philadelphia Eagles' practice squad. He was elevated from the practice squad ahead of the Eagles' season opener against the Dallas Cowboys. On September 24, Epps was signed to the active roster. He was placed on injured reserve due to an undisclosed injury on November 1. Epps was activated on December 8, ahead of the team's Week 14 matchup against the Los Angeles Chargers.

On March 23, 2026, Epps re-signed with the Eagles on a one-year contract.
