= Greg Austin (American football) =

American football player and coach (born 1984)

Philadelphia Eagles
- Title: Assistant offensive line coach

Personal information
- Born: November 19, 1984 (age 41); Houston, Texas, U.S.
- Listed height: 6 ft 1 in (1.85 m)
- Listed weight: 295 lb (134 kg)

Career information
- Position: Guard
- College: Nebraska

Career history
- Oregon (2010–2012) Graduate assistant; Philadelphia Eagles (2013–2015) Assistant offensive line coach; UCF (2016–2017) Offensive line coach; Nebraska (2018–2021) Offensive line coach; FIU (2022) Offensive line coach/recruiting game coordinator; Jacksonville Jaguars (2023) Offensive quality control coach; Jacksonville Jaguars (2024) Assistant offensive line coach; Philadelphia Eagles (2025–present) Assistant offensive line coach

Greg Austin (born November 19, 1984) is an American football coach and former player. He is currently the assistant offensive line coach for the Philadelphia Eagles. He was previously the offensive line coach for the Jacksonville Jaguars, FIU, the University of Nebraska–Lincoln and the University of Central Florida. He also played guard for the Nebraska Cornhuskers from 2003 to 2007.

In August 2018, Austin was nominated as part of ESPN's '40 Under 40.'

== Early life ==
Austin was born on November 19, 1983, in Houston, Texas, at St. Luke's Hospital to Jacqueline L. Austin and Gregory D. Austin Sr. He attended Cy-Fair High School in Cypress, Texas, where he played football and a shot putter for the track and field team was elected homecoming king. While at Cy-Fair, his nickname was "BG," or "Big Greg " due his popularity and leadership qualities among his teammates, peers, coaches and teachers. He eventually committed to a football scholarship at the University of Nebraska upon graduating in 2003. Other prospects included North Texas, Oklahoma State, Rice, SMU and Texas Tech.

== College career ==
Upon visiting Nebraska's campus in November 2002 and being heavily recruited by head coach Frank Solich, Austin signed a letter of intent to play for the Huskers in spring of 2003. He earned a spot that fall as a true starter on Solich's offensive line. He was the fifth true freshman in Nebraska's history to ever do so. His offensive teammates that year included Jammal Lord and his roommate Cory Ross. Despite a knee injury that sidelined him in the late season, the Cornhuskers went on to win the Alamo Bowl his first year against Michigan State. Austin retained his starting role throughout his tenure at Nebraska as they reclaimed victory two years later at the Alamo Bowl against Michigan. This time, it was under new head coach Bill Callahan. In his final year, the Huskers, including starting running back and roommate Brandon Jackson, fell in a close game to Auburn in the 2007 Cotton Bowl Classic. He graduated in 2007 from Nebraska with a Bachelors in Business Administration. Other teammates included Titus Adams, Joe Dailey, Sam Koch, Carl Nicks, Ndamukong Suh, Barrett Ruud, Zac Taylor, and Fabian Washington.

Shortly after graduating from Nebraska, under the tutelage of Richard Lapchick and Richard DeVos, Austin enrolled at the University of Central Florida where he studied under the DeVos Sports Management Program. Austin credited Lapchick and DeVos on matriculating to UCF by saying their societal contributions, "really drew me in, and from there, I knew it was bigger than me." He graduated from UCF in 2009 with dual master's degrees in business sports management.

Pre-draft measurables
| Height | Weight |
|---|---|
| 6 ft 1 1/4 in (1.86 m) | 295 lb (134 kg) |
Values from Pro Day

== Coaching career ==
=== Early career ===
Austin's coaching career began shortly after graduating from UCF where he also worked as an event manager for Disney's Wide World of Sports. He took an intern graduate assistant coaching position at both Mesabi Range College and later Wayne State University. At both schools, he assisted with the offensive line as an intern coach.

=== Oregon ===
In mid-2010, Austin received an offer to join Chip Kelly's coaching staff as a graduate assistant intern for the University of Oregon. Known by players and coaches alike as "Coach G", he helped coach the offensive line under the guidance of offensive coordinator Mark Helfrich. Although he started as a coaching intern in with Oregon, Austin was later promoted to, and remained, graduate assistant offensive coach the following year. When Austin came on board, the 2010 Ducks were 12-0 (8-0 Pac-10) in regular season play and went on to win the Pac-10 Conference title, the first undefeated and untied regular season in the school's 117-year football history. They went on to play against Heisman winner Cam Newton and the Auburn Tigers for the 2011 BCS National Championship in the Fiesta Bowl, but narrowly lost by a field goal towards the end of regulation. For the next two years, Austin and the Ducks would go on to retain the conference title in 2011, win the 2012 Rose Bowl and 2013 Fiesta Bowl with 12–2 (8–1 Pac-12) and 12–1 (8–1 Pac-12) records, respectively. This accumulates a 36-4 record while Austin was with the Ducks. During an Oregon News interview, Austin said, "winning the Rose Bowl was one of the funnest moments I ever had on the field."

=== Philadelphia Eagles ===
Austin left Oregon with Chip Kelly after the 2012 season to join the Philadelphia Eagles.

=== Central Florida and Nebraska ===
Austin joined new head coach Scott Frost's staff at the University of Central Florida (UCF) in 2016 as offensive line coach. When Frost departed after 2017 to become head coach at Nebraska, Austin followed him and took the same role there. Austin was one of four offensive assistants dismissed on November 8, 2021, in a major reshuffle of the offensive staff.

=== FIU ===
On January 2, 2022, it was reported that Austin would be joining Mike MacIntyre's inaugural FIU staff as the run game coordinator and offensive line coach.

=== Jacksonville Jaguars ===
On February 1, 2023, it was reported the Austin would be returning to the NFL as the offensive assistant coach on Doug Pederson's Jacksonville Jaguars staff. On February 22, 2024, Austin was named assistant offensive line coach for the Jaguars.

=== Philadelphia Eagles (second stint) ===
On February 27, 2025, the Philadelphia Eagles hired Austin to serve as their assistant offensive line coach.
