= Hollin Pierce =

American football player (born 2001)

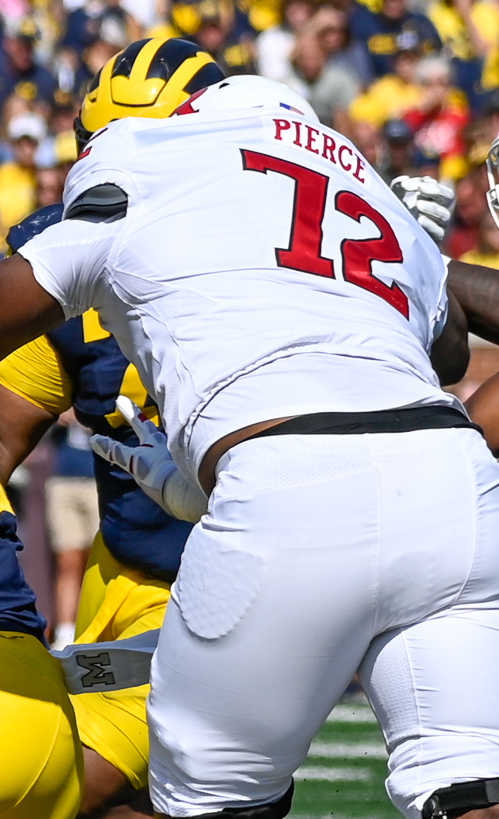

Colorado Stampede
- Position: Tackle
- Roster status: Unsigned draft pick

Personal information
- Born: April 19, 2001 (age 25); Trenton, New Jersey, U.S.
- Listed height: 6 ft 8 in (2.03 m)
- Listed weight: 341 lb (155 kg)

Career information
- High school: Fork Union Military Academy (Fork Union, Virginia)
- College: Rutgers (2020–2024)
- NFL draft: 2025: undrafted

Career history
- Philadelphia Eagles (2025)*; Colorado Stampede (2027-present)
- * Offseason or practice squad member only

Awards and highlights
- Second-team All-Big Ten (2024)
- Stats at Pro Football Reference

Hollin Pierce (born April 19, 2001) is an American professional football offensive tackle. He played college football for the Rutgers Scarlet Knights.

== Early life ==
Pierce attended Fork Union Military Academy in Fork Union, Virginia. Coming out of high school, he was unranked, and he committed to play college football for the Rutgers Scarlet Knights, joining the team as a walk-on.

== College career ==
In his first three seasons from 2020 to 2022, Pierce played in 26 games with 24 starts for the Scarlet Knights, becoming a full-time starter in 2021. He was also a Burlsworth Trophy nominee in 2022. During the 2023 season, Pierce switched to left tackle, where he started all 13 games at left tackle for the Scarlet Knights and was named honorable mention all-Big Ten Conference. Ahead of the 2024 season, he was named the 98th best college football player by On3.com. Pierce was once again nominated for the Burlsworth Award in 2024.

== Professional career ==
Pre-draft measurables
Height	Weight	Arm length	Hand span	Wingspan
6 ft 8 3/8 in (2.04 m)	341 lb (155 kg)	36 in (0.91 m)	9 7/8 in (0.25 m)	7 ft 4 1/4 in (2.24 m)
All values from NFL Combine

Pierce signed with the Philadelphia Eagles as an undrafted free agent on May 2, 2025. He was waived on August 26 as part of final roster cuts and re-signed to the practice squad the next day. Pierce was released on September 3, and then added to the practice squad on September 8. He signed a reserve/future contract with Philadelphia on January 12, 2026.

On August 17, 2026, Pierce was waived by the Eagles.
