= Cal Adomitis =

American football player (born 1998)

Profile
- Position: Long snapper

Personal information
- Born: July 9, 1998 (age 28); Pittsburgh, Pennsylvania, U.S.
- Listed height: 6 ft 2 in (1.88 m)
- Listed weight: 235 lb (107 kg)

Career information
- High school: Central Catholic (Pittsburgh)
- College: Pittsburgh (2017–2021)
- NFL draft: 2022: undrafted

Career history
- Cincinnati Bengals (2022–2024); Philadelphia Eagles (2025); Pittsburgh Steelers (2025)*; Green Bay Packers (2026)*; Miami Dolphins (2026)*; New Orleans Saints (2026)
- * Offseason or practice squad member only

Awards and highlights
- First-team All-American (2021); Patrick Mannelly Award (2021)

Career NFL statistics as of 2026
- Games played: 61
- Total tackles: 8
- Stats at Pro Football Reference

Callen James Adomitis (born July 9, 1998) is an American professional football long snapper. He played college football for the Pittsburgh Panthers.

== Early life ==
Adomitis was born on July 9, 1998, in Pittsburgh, Pennsylvania. He attended Central Catholic High School there, earning varsity letters in football and playing the tight end and long snapper positions.

== College career ==
Adomitis committed to the University of Pittsburgh, and saw immediate playing time as a true freshman playing long snapper. He played in all 12 games, and also made two tackles. He appeared in 14 games as a sophomore, making four tackles on the year. He played in all 13 games in 2019 as a junior, making four tackles again. In 2020, he started in all 11 games, bringing his streak to 50 consecutive appearances. He made one tackle on the year, and at the end was named a first-team all-Atlantic Coast Conference (ACC) long snapper.

As a fifth-year player in 2021, he appeared in every game and was named first-team All-American, becoming the first NCAA-recognized All-American selection at the position. He also won the 2021 Patrick Mannelly Award, given to the best long snapper in the nation.

== Professional career ==
Pre-draft measurables
Height	Weight	Arm length	Hand span	Wingspan	40-yard dash	10-yard split	20-yard split	20-yard shuttle	Three-cone drill	Vertical jump	Broad jump	Bench press
6 ft 1 5/8 in (1.87 m)	235 lb (107 kg)	30 1/8 in (0.77 m)	10 in (0.25 m)	6 ft 2 5/8 in (1.90 m)	4.97 s	1.72 s	2.86 s	4.62 s	7.53 s	29.5 in (0.75 m)	8 ft 11 in (2.72 m)	18 reps
All values from NFL Combine

=== Cincinnati Bengals ===
After going unselected in the 2022 NFL draft, Adomitis was signed by the Cincinnati Bengals as an undrafted free agent. He was waived on August 30, 2022, and signed to the practice squad the next day. Following a week 1 injury to longtime long snapper Clark Harris, Adomitis was signed to the active roster on September 12. He made his NFL debut against the Dallas Cowboys in week two. He finished the season with 15 regular season games played, while posting two tackles. Adomitis also appeared in the Bengals' three playoff games, and recorded an additional tackle.

Adomitis was re-signed to the Bengals for another season on February 22, 2023. He recorded a tackle in the Bengals' Week 1 game against the Cleveland Browns. He appeared in all 17 games in the 2023 season.

On August 26, 2025, Adomitis was waived by the Bengals as part of final roster cuts.

=== Philadelphia Eagles ===
On September 30, 2025, Adomitis signed with the Philadelphia Eagles. The Eagles announced he was waived from the team on December 9.

=== Pittsburgh Steelers ===
On December 19, 2025, Adomitis was signed to the Pittsburgh Steelers' practice squad. On January 14, 2026, he signed a reserve/futures contract with Pittsburgh. Adomitis was released by the Steelers on June 11.

=== Green Bay Packers ===
On July 31, 2026, Adomitis signed with the Green Bay Packers. On August 30, he was released by Green Bay as a part of final roster cuts.

=== Miami Dolphins ===
On September 16, 2026, Adomitis signed with the Miami Dolphins' practice squad.

=== New Orleans Saints ===
On September 23, 2026, Adomitis was signed by the New Orleans Saints off of the Dolphins' practice squad. On October 13, he was released.

== Personal life ==
Adomitis raised over $114,000 in 2021 to donate towards the Children's Hospital of Pittsburgh.

He is the son of Andy and Katherine Adomitis and has two brothers.
