= Kevin Patullo =

American football player and coach (born 1981)

Miami Dolphins
- Title: Passing game coordinator

Personal information
- Born: July 14, 1981 (age 45); Hillsborough Township, New Jersey, U.S.

Career information
- Positions: Quarterback, wide receiver
- High school: Western (Davie, Florida)
- College: South Florida (1999–2002)

Career history
- South Florida (2003–2004) Graduate assistant; Arizona (2004–2006) Graduate assistant; Kansas City Chiefs (2007–2008) Offensive assistant & offensive quality control coach; Buffalo Bills (2010–2012); Offensive quality control coach (2010–2011); Offensive assistant & assistant wide receivers coach (2012); Tennessee Titans (2014) Assistant wide receivers coach; New York Jets (2015–2016) Quarterbacks coach; Texas A&M (2017) Senior offensive analyst; Indianapolis Colts (2018–2020); Wide receivers coach (2018–2019); Pass game specialist (2020); Philadelphia Eagles (2021–2025); Pass game coordinator (2021–2022); Pass game coordinator & associate head coach (2023–2024); Offensive coordinator (2025); Miami Dolphins (2026–present) Passing game coordinator

Awards and highlights
- Super Bowl champion (LIX)
- Coaching profile at Pro Football Reference

Kevin Alan Patullo (born July 14, 1981) is an American professional football coach who is the passing game coordinator for the Miami Dolphins of the National Football League (NFL). He previously served as an assistant coach for the Indianapolis Colts, New York Jets, Tennessee Titans, Buffalo Bills, Kansas City Chiefs, and Philadelphia Eagles.

== Early life and playing career ==
A native of Hillsborough Township, New Jersey, Patullo attended Western High School in Davie, Florida. As the school's starting quarterback, he broke his leg in the first game of his senior year. Patullo attended and played college football at the University of South Florida, where he split time at both quarterback and wide receiver.

== Coaching career ==
=== Early career ===
Following his playing career, Patullo spent time at his alma mater South Florida and Arizona as a graduate assistant. He also had stints with the Kansas City Chiefs and Buffalo Bills as an offensive assistant and quality control coach before joining the Tennessee Titans in 2014 as an assistant wide receivers coach.

=== New York Jets ===
Patullo was hired to be the quarterbacks coach for the New York Jets for the 2015 season. Considered an unusual hire due to his lack of coaching experience at the time, he was hired as he had previous experience with both Jets offensive coordinator Chan Gailey and starting quarterback Ryan Fitzpatrick from his time in Buffalo. Patullo was fired alongside five other assistant coaches on January 3, 2017.

=== Texas A&M ===
After his termination from the Jets, Patullo joined the staff at Texas A&M as a senior offensive analyst.

=== Indianapolis Colts ===
Patullo was hired as the wide receivers coach for the Indianapolis Colts in 2018. He was reassigned to pass game specialist before the 2020 season following the hire of Mike Groh.

=== Philadelphia Eagles ===
On January 24, 2021, Patullo was hired by the Philadelphia Eagles as their passing game coordinator under head coach Nick Sirianni. He was part of the coaching staff that won Super Bowl LIX over the Kansas City Chiefs.

On February 19, 2025, Patullo was promoted to offensive coordinator, replacing Kellen Moore who departed to become head coach of the New Orleans Saints. Patullo's play calling was criticized throughout the season, with pundits and players calling Patullo's offense uninspiring and very predictable with his high usage rate of hitch routes and inside zone, lack of motion and reluctance of using mesh routes to scheme players open.

Following their loss in the Wild Card Round to the San Francisco 49ers at home, on January 13, 2026, the Eagles fired Patullo.

=== Miami Dolphins ===
On February 13, 2026, Patullo was hired by the Miami Dolphins to serve as the team's passing game coordinator under head coach Jeff Hafley.

== Personal life ==
Patullo is married to his wife, Nichole and they have two children together: a daughter, Lauren, and a son, Logan.

Following the Eagles' 24–15 loss to the Chicago Bears on November 28, 2025, Patullo's residence in Moorestown, New Jersey was vandalized and egged by several Eagles fans. Patullo criticized the incident, saying that it "crossed the line."
