= 2026 Philadelphia Eagles season =

94th season in franchise history

- Owner: Jeffrey Lurie
- General manager: Howie Roseman
- President: Don Smolenski
- Head coach: Nick Sirianni
- Offensive coordinator: Sean Mannion
- Defensive coordinator: Vic Fangio
- Home stadium: Lincoln Financial Field

Results
- Record: 3–7
- Division place: 4th NFC East

Uniform
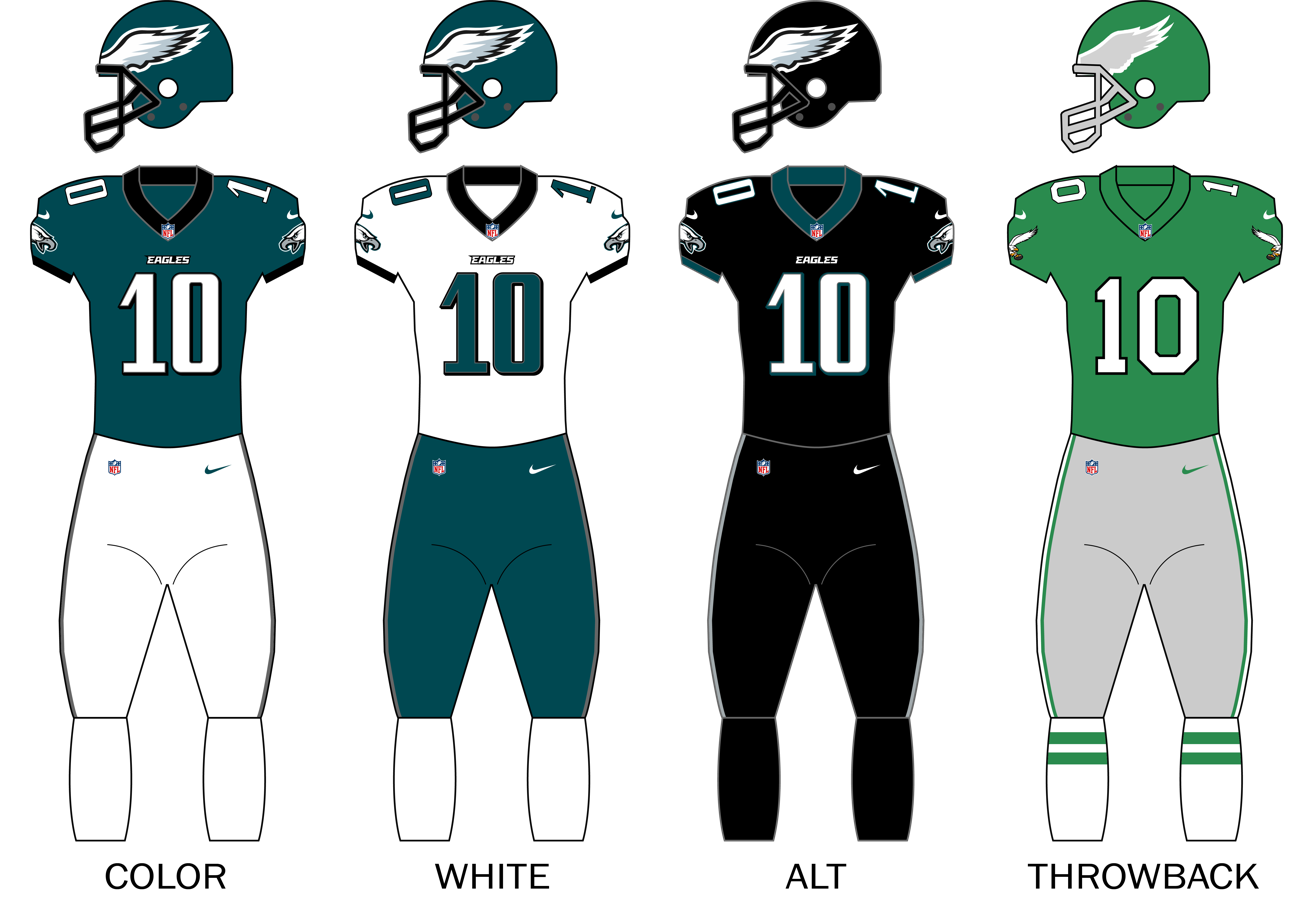

The 2026 season is the Philadelphia Eagles' 94th season in the National Football League (NFL) and their sixth under head coach Nick Sirianni. They will attempt to make the playoffs for the sixth consecutive season and win the NFC East for the third consecutive season. It will also mark the first season since 2021 without wide receiver A.J. Brown, following his trade to the New England Patriots. This season began with the team's fifth offensive coordinator in as many seasons, as Kevin Patullo was fired after the 2025 season. Despite starting 2–0, the Eagles lost seven straight games for the first time since 2012, failing to improve on their 11–6 record from the previous season and suffering their worst start since 1999.

On October 19, 2026, it was announced that star quarterback Jalen Hurts would miss the remainder of the season after he was diagnosed with deep vein thrombosis and bilateral pulmonary emboli. During an October 4 game against the Los Angeles Rams, Hurts was hit in the calf by a cleat, and a blood clot was discovered there by medical staff prior to the October 11 game against the Jacksonville Jaguars in London. Hurts was cleared to participate in that game before returning to the United States. A later examination uncovered blood clots in both of Hurts' lungs. The Eagles' handling of Hurts' medical condition were scrutinized by media pundits, fans, and the NFL Players Association.

== NFL Top 100 ==
The Eagles have six players ranked in the NFL Top 100 Players of 2026.

| Rank | Player | Position | Change |
|---|---|---|---|
| 29 | Jalen Carter | DT | ▲14 |
| 34 | Saquon Barkley | RB | ▼33 |
| 38 | Cooper DeJean | CB | ▲22 |
| 45 | Zack Baun | LB | ▼19 |
| 47 | Quinyon Mitchell | CB | ▲2 |
| 56 | Jalen Hurts | QB | ▼37 |

The following player was ranked in the NFL Top 100 Players of 2026 based on his performance with the Philadelphia Eagles in 2025 but is no longer on the team following the release of the list.

| Rank | Player | Position | Change |
|---|---|---|---|
| 80 | A. J. Brown | WR | ▼51 |

== Offseason ==
=== Coaching changes ===
On January 13, 2026, the Eagles parted ways with offensive coordinator Kevin Patullo after only one year in that role. On January 29, Sean Mannion was named the team's new offensive coordinator, marking the team’s fifth consecutive year with a new offensive coordinator.

This will be the Eagles' first season since 2012 without offensive line coach & run game coordinator Jeff Stoutland, who announced his departure from the organization on February 4. Ryan Mahaffey was named the team's new run game coordinator & tight ends coach on February 6, and Chris Kuper was named the team's new offensive line coach on February 9.

2026 Philadelphia Eagles coaching staff changes
| Position | Previous coach(es) | Vacancy reason | Replacement(s) | Source(s) |
|---|---|---|---|---|
| Offensive coordinator | Kevin Patullo, 2025 | Mutual agreement | Sean Mannion | |
| Passing game coordinator | Parks Frazier, 2025 | Hired as Quarterbacks coach | Josh Grizzard | |
| Quarterbacks coach | Scot Loeffler, 2025 | Mutual agreement | Parks Frazier | |
| Offensive line coach | Jeff Stoutland, 2013–2025 | Mutual agreement | Chris Kuper | |
| Run game coordinator | Jeff Stoutland, 2013–2025 | Mutual agreement | Ryan Mahaffey | |
| Tight ends coach | Jason Michael, 2021–2025 | Mutual agreement | Ryan Mahaffey | |
| Senior offensive assistant | Vacant | | Jerrod Johnson | |
| Defensive backs coach | Christian Parker, 2024–2025 | Hired by Dallas | Mike Pellegrino | |
| Defensive pass game coordinator | Christian Parker, 2024–2025 | Hired by Dallas | Joe Kasper | |
| Defensive assistant | Tyler Yelk, 2025 | Hired by Nebraska | Beyah Rasool | |
| Defensive assistant | Tyler Yelk, 2025 | Hired by Nebraska | Allen Smith | |
| Assistant linebackers coach | Ronell Williams, 2024–2025 | Hired by Las Vegas | Tyler Scudder | |

=== Futures contracts ===
| Position | Player | Date signed |
|---|---|---|
| LB | Chance Campbell | January 12 |
| CB | Tariq Castro-Fields | January 12 |
| WR | Danny Gray | January 12 |
| DT | Gabe Hall | January 12 |
| S | Brandon Johnson | January 12 |
| C | Jake Majors | January 12 |
| T | Hollin Pierce | January 12 |
| WR | Quez Watkins | January 12 |
| TE | E.J. Jenkins | January 13 |
| T | John Ojukwu | January 13 |
| FB | Carson Steele | January 13 |
| S | Andre' Sam | January 14 |
| LB | Jose Ramirez | January 15 |
| CB | Ambry Thomas | January 20 |
| TE | Jaheim Bell | January 21 |
| DE | Ta'Quon Graham | March 2 |

=== Free agents ===
Below are players whose contracts with the team expired after the 2025 season.

| Position | Player | Tag | 2026 team | Notes |
|---|---|---|---|---|
| S | Reed Blankenship | UFA | Houston Texans | 3 years, $24.75 million |
| TE | Grant Calcaterra | UFA | Philadelphia Eagles | 1 year, $700k |
| LB | Nakobe Dean | UFA | Las Vegas Raiders | 3 years, $36 million |
| RB | A.J. Dillon | UFA | Carolina Panthers | 1 year |
| WR | Jahan Dotson | UFA | Atlanta Falcons | 2 years, $15 million |
| S | Marcus Epps | UFA | Philadelphia Eagles | 1 year, $1.55 million |
| TE | Dallas Goedert | UFA | Philadelphia Eagles | 1 year, $7 million |
| DE | Brandon Graham | UFA | TBD | |
| TE | Kylen Granson | UFA | Tennessee Titans | 1 year |
| QB | Sam Howell | UFA | Dallas Cowboys | 1 year |
| CB | Adoree' Jackson | UFA | TBD | |
| T | Fred Johnson | UFA | Philadelphia Eagles | 1 year |
| P | Braden Mann | UFA | Philadelphia Eagles | 4 years, $14 million |
| LB | Azeez Ojulari | UFA | Atlanta Falcons | 1 year |
| LB | Ogbo Okoronkwo | UFA | San Francisco 49ers | 1 year |
| LB | Jaelan Phillips | UFA | Carolina Panthers | 4 years, $120 million |
| G | Matt Pryor | UFA | Arizona Cardinals | 1 year |
| G | Brett Toth | UFA | San Francisco 49ers | 1 year |
| LB | Joshua Uche | UFA | Miami Dolphins | 1 year |
| FB | Ben VanSumeren | RFA | Buffalo Bills | 1 year |

=== Signings ===
| Position | Player | Tag | Previous team | Date signed | Notes |
|---|---|---|---|---|---|
| TE | Johnny Mundt | UFA | Jacksonville Jaguars | March 11 | 1 year, $750k |
| CB | Riq Woolen | UFA | Seattle Seahawks | March 11 | 1 year, $12 million |
| LB | Arnold Ebiketie | UFA | Atlanta Falcons | March 13 | 1 year, $4.3 million |
| CB | Jonathan Jones | UFA | Washington Commanders | March 13 | 1 year, $2 million |
| WR | Marquise Brown | UFA | Kansas City Chiefs | March 17 | 1 year, $6.5 million |
| RB | Dameon Pierce | UFA | Kansas City Chiefs | March 19 | 1 year, $1.29 million |
| TE | Stone Smartt | UFA | New York Jets | March 19 | 1 year, $250k |
| S | J. T. Gray | UFA | Tampa Bay Buccaneers | March 21 | 1 year, $350k |
| WR | Elijah Moore | UFA | Denver Broncos | March 25 | 1 year |
| DE | Joe Tryon-Shoyinka | UFA | Chicago Bears | March 30 | 1 year |
| LB | Chandler Martin | UFA | Baltimore Ravens | March 31 | 2 years |
| LB | Chandler Martin | UFA | Philadelphia Eagles | June 4 | |
| WR | Samori Toure | UFA | New Orleans Saints | June 1 | 1 year |
| RB | Elijah Mitchell | UFA | New England Patriots | June 2 | 1 year |
| DE | A.J. Epenesa | UFA | Buffalo Bills | June 10 | 1 year, $1.4 million |
| G | Michael Jordan | UFA | Tampa Bay Buccaneers | June 10 | 1 year |
| WR | Erik Ezukanma | UFA | DC Defenders | June 16 | 1 year |
| CB | Shaun Wade | UFA | Dallas Renegades | June 16 | 1 year |
| RB | Ja'Quinden Jackson | UFA | Jacksonville Jaguars | August 10 | 1 year |
| DE | Tarron Jackson | UFA | San Francisco 49ers | August 10 | 1 year |
| LB | Brandon George | UFA | Kansas City Chiefs | August 15 | 1 year |

=== Departures ===
| Position | Player | Date | Designation | 2026 team |
|---|---|---|---|---|
| TE | Jaheim Bell | April 28 | Waived | Pittsburgh Steelers |
| LB | Chandler Martin | June 1 | Waived | Philadelphia Eagles |
| LB | Chandler Martin | June 10 | Waived | New York Giants |
| WR | Brandon Hayes | June 5 | Waived | Philadelphia Eagles |
| WR | Brandon Hayes | August 15 | Waived | TBD |
| LB | Isiah King | June 10 | Waived | Edmonton Elks |
| CB | Brandon Johnson | June 16 | Waived | Seattle Seahawks |
| DE | Joe Tryon-Shoyinka | June 16 | Retired | —N/a |
| DE | Ta'Quon Graham | August 2 | Waived | TBD |
| G | Jaeden Roberts | August 10 | Waived | Atlanta Falcons |
| TE | Dae'Quan Wright | August 10 | Waived | Cleveland Browns |

=== Trades ===
Trades below are only for trades that included a player. Draft pick-only trades will go in the draft section.

| Date | Player(s)/Asset(s) received | Team | Player(s)/Asset(s) traded | Source |
|---|---|---|---|---|
| March 21 | 2026 4th round selection (No. 114), 2026 6th round selection (No. 197) | Atlanta Falcons | S Sydney Brown, 2026 4th round selection (No. 122), 2026 6th round selection (No. 215) | |
| March 24 | QB Andy Dalton | Carolina Panthers | 2027 7th round selection (TBD) | |
| April 11 | WR Dontayvion Wicks | Green Bay Packers | 2026 5th round selection (No. 153), 2027 6th round selection (TBD) | |
| April 24 | LB Jonathan Greenard, 2026 7th round selection (No. 244) | Minnesota Vikings | 2026 3rd round selection (No. 98); 2027 3rd round selection (TBD) | |
| June 1 | 2027 5th round selection (TBD), 2028 1st round selection (TBD) | New England Patriots | WR A.J. Brown | |

=== Extensions and restructures ===
Below are players who are under contract through 2026 and received a contract extension or restructure.

| Position | Player | Date signed | Notes |
|---|---|---|---|
| DT | Jordan Davis | March 8 | 3 years, $78 million |
| CB | Michael Carter II | March 11 | Restructure |
| G | Landon Dickerson | March 12 | Restructure |
| K | Jake Elliott | March 19 | Restructure |
| WR | Dontayvion Wicks | April 11 | 1 year, $12.5 million |
| LB | Jonathan Greenard | April 24 | 4 years, $100 million |
| LB | Nolan Smith | April 27 | 1 year, $13.7 million* |
| DT | Jalen Carter | April 27 | 1 year, $27.1 million* |
| DT | Jalen Carter | July 28 | 4 years, $152 million |

* Fifth-year option

=== Draft ===
2026 Philadelphia Eagles draft selections
| Round | Selection | Player | Position | College | Notes |
|---|---|---|---|---|---|
| 1 | 20 | Makai Lemon | WR | USC | From Packers via Cowboys (Note: The Eagles traded a first-round selection and two fourth-round selections (23rd, 114th and 137th overall) to Dallas in exchange for a first-round selection (20th overall).) |
| 1 | 23 | Traded to the Dallas Cowboys | | | |
| 2 | 54 | Eli Stowers | TE | Vanderbilt | |
| 3 | 68 | Markel Bell | T | Miami (FL) | From Jets (Note: The Eagles traded LB Haason Reddick to New York in exchange for a third-round selection.) |
| 3 | 87 | Traded to the Miami Dolphins (Note: The Eagles traded a third-round selection to Miami in exchange for LB Jaelan Phillips.) | | | |
| 3 | 98 | Traded to the Minnesota Vikings (Note: The Eagles traded a third-round selection (98th overall) and a 2027 fourth-round selection to Minnesota in exchange for LB Jonathan Greenard and a seventh-round selection (244th overall).) | | | Compensatory selection |
| 4 | 114 | Traded to the Dallas Cowboys | | | From Falcons (Note: The Eagles traded fourth- and sixth-round selections and S Sydney Brown to Atlanta in exchange for fourth- and sixth-round selections.) |
| 4 | 122 | Traded to the Atlanta Falcons | | | |
| 4 | 137 | Traded to the Dallas Cowboys | | | Compensatory selection |
| 5 | 153 | Traded to the Green Bay Packers (Note: The Eagles traded a fifth-round selection and a 2027 sixth-round selection to Green Bay in exchange for WR Dontayvion Wicks.) | | | From Falcons (Note: The Eagles traded a 2025 third-round selection to Atlanta in exchange for a fifth-round selection and a 2025 third-round selection.) |
| 5 | 163 | Traded to the Minnesota Vikings (Note: The Eagles traded a fifth-round selection and a 2027 seventh-round selection to Minnesota in exchange for a sixth-round selection and QB Sam Howell.) | | | |
| 5 | 166 | Traded to the Jacksonville Jaguars | | | From 49ers |
| 5 | 167 | Traded to the Houston Texans | | | From Texans |
| 5 | 178 | Cole Payton | QB | North Dakota State | Compensatory selection |
| 6 | 197 | Traded to the Los Angeles Rams (Note: The Eagles traded a sixth-round selection (197th overall) to Los Angeles in exchange for a sixth-round selection and two seventh-round selections (No. 207, 251, and 252 overall).) | | | From Falcons |
| 6 | 203 | Traded to the Jacksonville Jaguars (Note: The Eagles traded fifth- and sixth-round selections to Jacksonville in exchange for RB/KR Tank Bigsby.) | | | From Eagles via Texans |
| 6 | 207 | Micah Morris | G | Georgia | From Texans via Rams |
| 6 | 211 | Traded to the Baltimore Ravens | | | From Broncos via Vikings |
| 6 | 215 | Traded to the Atlanta Falcons | | | Compensatory selection |
| 7 | 239 | Traded to the Jacksonville Jaguars (Note: The Eagles traded a seventh-round selection to Jacksonville in exchange for OT Fred Johnson.) | | | |
| 7 | 244 | Cole Wisniewski | S | Texas Tech | From Texans via Vikings |
| 7 | 251 | Uar Bernard | DT | IPP (Nigeria) | Compensatory selection from Rams |
| 7 | 252 | Keyshawn James-Newby | LB | New Mexico | Compensatory selection from Rams |

Draft trades

2026 Philadelphia Eagles undrafted free agents
| Name | Position | College | Ref. |
|---|---|---|---|
| David Blay | DT | Miami | |
| Kapena Gushiken | CB | Ole Miss | |
| Brandon Hayes | WR | Southeastern Louisiana | |
| Isiah King | LB | Idaho | |
| Tucker Large | S | Washington State | |
| Deontae Lawson | LB | Alabama | |
| Maximus Pulley | S | Wofford | |
| Jaeden Roberts | G | Alabama | |
| Rocco Underwood | LS | Florida | |
| Josh Weru | OLB | IPP (Kenya) | |
| Zion Wilson | DT | East Carolina | |
| Dae'Quan Wright | TE | Ole Miss | |

== Preseason transactions ==
Transactions below occurred between the day after the Eagles' first preseason game and the day before their first regular season game.

=== Signings ===
| Position | Player | Tag | Previous team | Date signed |
|---|---|---|---|---|
| CB | Isaiah Bolden | UFA | Louisville Kings | August 17 |
| C | Zeke Correll | UFA | Minnesota Vikings | August 21 |
| S | Jaylen Mahoney | UFA | Orlando Storm | August 24 |
| RB | Jordan Mims | UFA | Minnesota Vikings | August 24 |
| WR | Tahj Washington | UFA | Miami Dolphins | August 27 |

=== Departures ===
Players below were released or waived outside of the league-mandated cut date.

| Position | Player | Date | Designation | 2026 team |
|---|---|---|---|---|
| T | Hollin Pierce | August 17 | Waived | TBD |
| S | J. T. Gray | August 24 | Waived | TBD |
| WR | Brandon Hayes | August 27 | Waived | TBD |

=== Cuts to 53 ===
| * | = Practice squad signings |

The roster was cut to 53 on August 30, 2026.

| Position | Name | Designation | 2026 team | Notes |
|---|---|---|---|---|
| DT | Uar Bernard | Waived | Philadelphia Eagles | signed August 31 |
| DT | David Blay Jr. | Waived | Green Bay Packers | Practice Squad |
| CB | Isaiah Bolden | Waived | TBD | |
| LB | Chance Campbell | Released | Philadelphia Eagles | signed August 31 |
| C | Zeke Correll | Waived | TBD | |
| WR | Britain Covey | Released | Philadelphia Eagles | signed August 31 |
| WR | Erik Ezukanma | Waived | Philadelphia Eagles | signed October 7 |
| LB | Brandon George | Waived | TBD | |
| WR | Danny Gray | Released | Philadelphia Eagles | signed September 1 |
| S | Kapena Gushiken | Waived | Indianapolis Colts | |
| DT | Gabe Hall | Waived | Philadelphia Eagles | signed August 31, released September 22 |
| T | Myles Hinton | Waived | Cincinnati Bengals | |
| OLB | Tarron Jackson | Released | TBD | |
| OLB | Keyshawn James-Newby | Waived | Philadelphia Eagles | signed August 31 |
| G | Michael Jordan | Released | Baltimore Ravens | Practice Squad |
| TE | Cameron Latu | Waived | New England Patriots | |
| LB | Deontae Lawson | Waived | TBD | |
| S | Jaylen Mahoney | Waived | TBD | |
| C | Jake Majors | Waived | Philadelphia Eagles | signed August 31 |
| RB | Jordan Mims | Waived | TBD | |
| T | John Ojukwu | Waived | Philadelphia Eagles | signed August 31 |
| RB | Dameon Pierce | Released | Philadelphia Eagles | signed August 31 |
| S | Maximus Pulley | Waived | Philadelphia Eagles | signed August 31 |
| OLB | Jose Ramirez | Waived | New England Patriots | |
| TE | Stone Smartt | Released | New Orleans Saints | |
| FB | Carson Steele | Waived | Philadelphia Eagles | signed August 31 |
| WR | Samori Toure | Waived | TBD | |
| CB | Ambry Thomas | Released | TBD | |
| WR | Tahj Washington | Waived | TBD | |
| CB | Shaun Wade | Released | Philadelphia Eagles | signed September 24 |
| WR | Quez Watkins | Released | Indianapolis Colts | Practice Squad |
| OLB | Joshua Weru | Waived | Philadelphia Eagles | signed August 31 |
| T | Cameron Williams | Waived | Atlanta Falcons | |
| DT | Zion Wilson | Waived | Philadelphia Eagles | signed October 13 |
| S | Cole Wisniewski | Waived | Philadelphia Eagles | signed August 31 |

=== Practice squad signings ===
Below are players who were signed to the practice squad after final roster cuts.

| Position | Name | Previous team | Date signed |
|---|---|---|---|
| LB | Mason Reiger | Miami Dolphins | August 31 |
| T | Kiran Amegadjie | Chicago Bears | September 1 |
| RB | Jaydon Blue | Dallas Cowboys | September 1 |
| CB | Robert Longerbeam | Baltimore Ravens | September 1 |
| WR | Xavier Gipson | New York Giants | September 11 |

== Regular season transactions ==
Players listed below were involved in a transaction after the Eagles first game of the regular season.

=== Practice squad elevations ===
Players below were activated via a standard elevation prior to a game. A standard elevation is when a team temporarily activates a player from the practice squad to the active roster and allows them to send the player back to the practice squad without needing to clear waivers first.

| Position | Name | Week(s) |
|---|---|---|
| LB | Chance Campbell | 3 |
| WR | Britain Covey | 1 |
| TE | Josiah Deguara | 4 |
| TE | Zach Ertz | 3–5 |
| DT | Gabe Hall | 11 |
| LB | Keyshawn James-Newby | 6, 7 |
| RB | Elijah Mitchell | 7–9 |
| T | John Ojukwu | 5 |
| LB | Anfernee Orji | 11 |
| S | Maximus Pulley | 2 |
| S | Cole Wisniewski | 6, 9 |
| OLB | Mason Reiger | 8 |

=== Signings ===
Players below were signed to the 53-man roster.

| Position | Player | Tag | Previous team | Date signed | Notes |
|---|---|---|---|---|---|
| WR | Britain Covey | PS | Philadelphia Eagles | September 15 | |
| CB | Kenny Moore II | PS | Philadelphia Eagles | September 29 | |
| RB | Dameon Pierce | PS | Philadelphia Eagles | October 7 | |
| C | Jake Majors | PS | Philadelphia Eagles | October 9 | |
| RB | Carson Steele | PS | Philadelphia Eagles | October 9 | |
| QB | Joe Milton | UFA | Dallas Cowboys | October 16 | |
| RB | Jaydon Blue | PS | Philadelphia Eagles | October 17 | |
| RB | Jaydon Blue | PS | Philadelphia Eagles | October 28 | |
| RB | Jaydon Blue | PS | Philadelphia Eagles | November 17 | |
| TE | Zach Ertz | PS | Philadelphia Eagles | November 16 | |
| T | John Ojukwu | PS | Philadelphia Eagles | November 16 | |
| T | Ajani Cornelius | WVR | Dallas Cowboys | November 18 | |

==== Practice squad signings ====
Below are players who were signed to the practice squad.

| Position | Name | Previous team | Date signed |
|---|---|---|---|
| TE | Josiah Deguara | New York Giants | September 15 |
| TE | Zach Ertz | Washington Commanders | September 22 |
| CB | Kenny Moore II | Indianapolis Colts | September 23 |
| CB | Shaun Wade | Philadelphia Eagles | September 24 |
| CB | Shaun Wade | Philadelphia Eagles | October 28 |
| DT | Gabe Hall | Philadelphia Eagles | September 30 |
| LB | Anfernee Orji | New York Giants | October 1 |
| LB | Anfernee Orji | Philadelphia Eagles | October 22 |
| C | James Brockermeyer | Atlanta Falcons | October 7 |
| T | Xavier Truss | Cleveland Browns | October 13 |
| DT | Zion Wilson | Philadelphia Eagles | October 13 |
| S | Dean Clark | New York Jets | October 14 |
| RB | Ian Wheeler | Buffalo Bills | October 15 |
| RB | Elijah Mitchell | New England Patriots | October 20 |
| RB | Jaydon Blue | Philadelphia Eagles | October 22 |
| RB | Jaydon Blue | Philadelphia Eagles | November 16 |
| G | Evan Neal | Las Vegas Raiders | October 22 |
| G | Evan Beerntsen | Seattle Seahawks | October 28 |
| WR | Quentin Skinner | Buffalo Bills | October 28 |
| WR | Quentin Skinner | Buffalo Bills | November 18 |
| CB | Christian Braswell | Jacksonville Jaguars | November 4 |
| LB | Chance Campbell | Philadelphia Eagles | November 16 |
| TE | Hayden Rucci | Los Angeles Chargers | November 16 |
| DT | Leki Fotu | New York Giants | November 17 |

=== Trades ===
| Date | Player(s)/Asset(s) received | Team | Player(s)/Asset(s) traded | Source |
|---|---|---|---|---|
| October 7 | 2027 5th round selection (TBD), 2028 2nd round selection (TBD) | Baltimore Ravens | C Cam Jurgens, 2027 7th round selection (TBD) | |
| November 9 | 2027 1st round selection (TBD), 2029 2nd round selection (TBD) | Jacksonville Jaguars | DT Jordan Davis | |

=== Departures ===
Players below were released or waived from the 53-man roster.

| Position | Player | Date | Designation | 2026 team |
|---|---|---|---|---|
| QB | Andy Dalton | October 9 | Released | Atlanta Falcons |
| RB | Jaydon Blue | October 20 | Waived | Philadelphia Eagles |
| RB | Jaydon Blue | November 10 | Waived | Philadelphia Eagles |
| RB | Carson Steele | October 20 | Waived/Injured | TBD |
| TE | E. J. Jenkins | October 22 | Waived | Atlanta Falcons |
| WR | Marquise Brown | November 12 | Waived | TBD |
| T | Fred Johnson | November 13 | Waived | Kansas City Chiefs |

==== Retirements ====
On October 6, right tackle Lane Johnson announced his immediate retirement from the NFL after spending 14 seasons with the Eagles. However, Johnson will remain on the 53-man roster through the remainder of the 2026 season rather than being placed on the Reserve/Retired list.

== Staff ==
Philadelphia Eagles staff
| Front office: Chairman/CEO – Jeffrey Lurie; President – Don Smolenski; General manager/executive vice president – Howie Roseman; Assistant general manager – Adam Berry, Jon Ferrari; Senior advisor to the general manager/chief security officer – Dom DiSandro; Head of football development and strategy – Connor Barwin; Senior vice president of player personnel – Joe Douglas; Vice president of football operations and strategic initiatives – Alan Wolking; Vice president of player personnel – Charles Walls, Phil Bhaya; Senior personnel director/advisor to the general manager – Matt Russell; Director of player personnel – Jeremy Gray; Director of football operations/pro scout – Ameena Soliman; Director of football administration – Grant Reiter; Senior director of football analytics and strategy – James Gilman; Director of football analytics – Jonathan Liu; Director of football research and strategy – Zachary Steever; Assistant director of personnel strategy – Zach Drapkin; Director of college scouting – Ryan Myers; Assistant director of college scouting – Matt Holland; Assistant director of pro scouting – Lee DiValerio, Jarrod Kilburn; Personnel executive – Mike Maccagnan; Head coaches: Head coach – Nick Sirianni; Assistant head coach/running backs – Jemal Singleton; Associate head coach/senior defensive assistant/defensive line – Clint Hurtt; Offensive coaches: Offensive coordinator – Sean Mannion; Pass game coordinator – Josh Grizzard; Quarterbacks – Parks Frazier; Wide receivers – Aaron Moorehead; Run game coordinator/tight ends – Ryan Mahaffey; Offensive line – Chris Kuper; Assistant offensive line – Greg Austin; Senior offensive assistant/special projects – Jerrod Johnson; Offensive assistant/assistant quarterbacks – Montgomery VanGorder; Offensive assistant/assistant tight ends – Eric Dickerson | Defensive coaches: Defensive coordinator – Vic Fangio; Defensive ends/outside linebackers – Jeremiah Washburn; Inside linebackers – Bobby King; Assistant linebackers – Tyler Scudder; Defensive pass game coordinator – Joe Kasper; Secondary – Mike Pellegrino; Cornerbacks – Roy Anderson; Defensive assistant – Beyah Rasool; Defensive assistant – Allen Smith; Special teams coaches: Special teams coordinator – Michael Clay; Assistant special teams coordinator/director of team relationships – Joe Pannunzio; Special teams assistant – Tyler Brown; Strength and conditioning: Head athletic trainer – Tom Hunkele; Head strength and conditioning – Fernando Noriega; → Coaching staff → Front office → More NFL staffs |

== Current roster ==
Philadelphia Eagles roster
| Quarterbacks (QB): 16 Tanner McKee; 14 Joe Milton; 18 Cole Payton; Running backs (RB): 26 Saquon Barkley; 30 Jaydon Blue; 28 Will Shipley; Wide receivers (WR): 80 Darius Cooper; 85 Britain Covey PR; 9 Makai Lemon; 19 Elijah Moore; 6 DeVonta Smith; Tight ends (TE): 81 Grant Calcaterra; 86 Zach Ertz; 88 Dallas Goedert; 83 Johnny Mundt; 87 Eli Stowers | Offensive linemen (OL): 72 Markel Bell T; 74 Ajani Cornelius T; 69 Landon Dickerson G; 65 Lane Johnson T; 66 Drew Kendall C; 61 Willie Lampkin G; 68 Jordan Mailata T; 75 Jake Majors C; 76 Micah Morris G; 67 John Ojukwu T; 56 Tyler Steen G; Defensive linemen (DL): 98 Jalen Carter DT; 97 Moro Ojomo DT; 95 Ty Robinson DT; 94 Byron Young DT | Linebackers (LB): 11 Jihaad Campbell; 17 Arnold Ebiketie OLB; 57 A. J. Epenesa OLB; 52 Jonathan Greenard OLB; 58 Jalyx Hunt OLB; 42 Smael Mondon Jr.; 3 Nolan Smith OLB; 54 Jeremiah Trotter Jr.; Defensive backs (DB): 35 Michael Carter II S; 33 Cooper DeJean CB; 29 Marcus Epps S; 31 Jonathan Jones CB; 22 Mac McWilliams CB; 27 Quinyon Mitchell CB; 23 Kenny Moore II CB; 24 Andrew Mukuba S; 7 Kelee Ringo CB; 2 Riq Woolen CB; Special teams (ST): 4 Jake Elliott K; 10 Braden Mann P; 41 Rocco Underwood LS | Practice squad: 73 Kiran Amegadjie T; 64 Evan Beerntsen G; 93 Uar Bernard DT (PS/I); 21 Christian Braswell CB; 59 Chance Campbell LB; 82 Erik Ezukanma WR; 77 Leki Fotu NT; 96 Gabe Hall DT; 50 Keyshawn James-Newby OLB; 49 Elijah Mitchell RB; 79 Evan Neal G; 45 Anfernee Orji LB; 43 Mason Reiger OLB; 47 Hayden Rucci TE; 84 Quentin Skinner WR; 46 Josh Weru OLB (IPP); 78 Zion Wilson DT; 38 Cole Wisniewski S; Reserve: 53 Zack Baun LB (IR); 8 Tank Bigsby RB (IR); 1 Jalen Hurts QB (IR); 37 Tucker Large S (NF-Inj.); 32 Andre' Sam S (IR); 13 Dontayvion Wicks WR (IR); 89 Johnny Wilson WR (IR) 52 active, 16 practice squad (2 IPP), 7 reserve As of November 21, 2026. Rookies in italics.; Roster; Depth chart; Transactions |

== Preseason ==
| Week | Date | Opponent | Result | Record | Venue | Recap |
|---|---|---|---|---|---|---|
| 1 | August 15 | at Baltimore Ravens | L 7–24 | 0–1 | M&T Bank Stadium | Recap |
| 2 | August 22 | at New England Patriots | L 21–24 | 0–2 | Gillette Stadium | Recap |
| 3 | August 28 | Cincinnati Bengals | L 13–30 | 0–3 | Lincoln Financial Field | Recap |

== Regular season ==
=== Schedule ===
| Week | Date | Time (ET) | Opponent | Result | Record | Venue | TV | Recap |
|---|---|---|---|---|---|---|---|---|
| 1 | September 13 | 4:25 p.m. | **Washington Commanders** | **W** 24–22 | 1–0 | Lincoln Financial Field | Fox | Recap |
| 2 | September 20 | 1:00 p.m. | at Tennessee Titans | **W** 24–20 | 2–0 | Nissan Stadium | Fox | Recap |
| 3 | September 28 | 8:15 p.m. | at Chicago Bears | **L** 7–27 | 2–1 | Soldier Field | ESPN/ABC | Recap |
| 4 | October 4 | 1:00 p.m. | Los Angeles Rams | **L** 20–24 | 2–2 | Lincoln Financial Field | Fox | Recap |
| 5 | October 11 | 9:30 a.m. | at Jacksonville Jaguars | **L** 17–19 | 2–3 | (United Kingdom) Tottenham Hotspur Stadium (London) | NFLN | Recap |
| 6 | October 18 | 1:00 p.m. | Carolina Panthers | **L** 14–25 | 2–4 | Lincoln Financial Field | CBS | Recap |
| 7 | October 26 | 8:15 p.m. | **Dallas Cowboys** | **L** 21–38 | 2–5 | Lincoln Financial Field | ESPN/ABC | Recap |
| 8 | November 1 | 8:20 p.m. | at **Washington Commanders** | **L** 10–27 | 2–6 | Northwest Stadium | NBC | Recap |
| 9 | November 8 | 1:00 p.m. | **New York Giants** | **L** 11–19 | 2–7 | Lincoln Financial Field | Fox | Recap |
| 10 | Bye | | | | | | | |
| 11 | November 22 | 1:00 p.m. | Pittsburgh Steelers | **W** 19–16 | 3–7 | Lincoln Financial Field | CBS | Recap |
| 12 | November 26 | 4:30 p.m. | at **Dallas Cowboys** | | | AT&T Stadium | Fox | |
| 13 | December 6 | 4:05 p.m. | at Arizona Cardinals | | | State Farm Stadium | Fox | |
| 14 | December 13 | 1:00 p.m. | Indianapolis Colts | | | Lincoln Financial Field | Fox | |
| 15 | December 19 | 5:00 p.m. | Seattle Seahawks | | | Lincoln Financial Field | Fox | |
| 16 | December 24 | 8:15 p.m. | Houston Texans | | | Lincoln Financial Field | Prime Video | |
| 17 | January 3 | 8:20 p.m. | at San Francisco 49ers | | | Levi's Stadium | NBC | |
| 18 | January 9/10 | TBD | at **New York Giants** | | | MetLife Stadium | TBD | |

Notes

- Intra-division opponents are in **bold** text.
- Networks, dates and times from Weeks 13–17 are subject to change as a result of flexible scheduling.
- The date, time and network for Week 18 will be finalized at the end of Week 17.

=== Game summaries ===
==== Week 1: vs. Washington Commanders ====
Week 1: Washington Commanders at Philadelphia Eagles – Game summary

| Quarter | 1 | 2 | 3 | 4 | Total |
|---|---|---|---|---|---|
| Commanders | 3 | 6 | 0 | 13 | **22** |
| **Eagles** | 0 | 14 | 3 | 7 | **24** |

at Lincoln Financial Field, Philadelphia, Pennsylvania

- Date: September 13
- Game time: 4:25 p.m. EDT
- Game weather: Clear, 82 °F (28 °C)
- Game attendance: 69,879
- Referee: Shawn Smith
- TV announcers (Fox): Kevin Burkhardt, Tom Brady, Erin Andrews and Tom Rinaldi
- Recap, Game Book

Game information

**First quarter**

- WSH – Drew Stevens 55-yard field goal, 11:23. Commanders 3–0. **Drive: 8 plays, 27 yards, 3:37.**

**Second quarter**

- PHI – Dallas Goedert 17-yard pass from Jalen Hurts (Jake Elliott kick), 14:11. Eagles 7–3. **Drive: 5 plays, 76 yards, 3:27.**
- PHI – Dontayvion Wicks 9-yard pass from Jalen Hurts (Jake Elliott kick), 6:27. Eagles 14–3. **Drive: 5 plays, 62 yards, 2:19.**
- WSH – Jacory Croskey-Merritt 1-yard run (kick blocked), 1:50. Eagles 14–9. **Drive: 12 plays, 67 yards, 4:34.**

**Third quarter**

- PHI – Jake Elliott 35-yard field goal, 0:44. Eagles 17–9. **Drive: 7 plays, 43 yards, 3:00.**

**Fourth quarter**

- WSH – Stefon Diggs 10-yard pass from Jayden Daniels (Drew Stevens kick), 9:59. Eagles 17–16. **Drive: 9 plays, 67 yards, 5:45.**
- PHI – Dallas Goedert 43-yard pass from Jalen Hurts (Jake Elliott kick), 6:02. Eagles 24–16. **Drive: 8 plays, 74 yards, 3:57.**
- WSH – Antonio Williams 1-yard pass from Jayden Daniels (pass failed), 1:01. Eagles 24–22. **Drive: 12 plays, 63 yards, 5:01.**

**Top passers**

- WSH – Jayden Daniels – 18/34, 164 yards, 2 TD
- PHI – Jalen Hurts – 14/25, 203 yards, 3 TD

**Top rushers**

- WSH – Jacory Croskey-Merritt – 16 rushes, 63 yards, TD
- PHI – Saquon Barkley – 15 rushes, 83 yards

**Top receivers**

- WSH – Antonio Williams – 4 receptions, 64 yards, TD
- PHI – Dallas Goedert – 4 receptions, 77 yards, 2 TD

While the Commanders did take an early 3–0 lead after the first quarter, Dallas Goedert scored a touchdown early in the second quarter to give Philadelphia a lead they never relinquished. The Eagles went ahead 14–9 following a missed extra point from Washington and increased the lead to 17–9 by the end of the third quarter. The Commanders began to mount a comeback and Antonio Williams scored a touchdown with a minute left to bring Washington within two. Moro Ojomo tackled John Bates before he could cross the plane on the two-point conversion, however, sealing Philadelphia’s 24–22 win.

==== Week 2: at Tennessee Titans ====
Week 2: Philadelphia Eagles at Tennessee Titans – Game summary

| Quarter | 1 | 2 | 3 | 4 | Total |
|---|---|---|---|---|---|
| **Eagles** | 0 | 14 | 3 | 7 | **24** |
| Titans | 7 | 3 | 7 | 3 | **20** |

at Nissan Stadium, Nashville, Tennessee

- Date: September 20
- Game time: 1:00 p.m. EDT/12:00 p.m. CDT
- Game weather: Cloudy, 92 °F (33 °C)
- Game attendance: 68,567
- Referee: Clay Martin
- TV announcers (Fox): Adam Amin, Drew Brees and Kristina Pink
- Recap, Game Book

Game information

**First quarter**

- TEN – Cam Ward 1-yard run (Joey Slye kick), 4:22. Titans 7–0. **Drive: 4 plays, 10 yards, 1:34.**

**Second quarter**

- PHI – Tank Bigsby 2-yard run (Jake Elliott kick), 12:49. Tied 7–7. **Drive: 11 plays, 65 yards, 6:33.**
- PHI – Devonta Smith 22-yard pass from Jalen Hurts (Jake Elliott kick), 1:49. Eagles 14–7. **Drive: 14 plays, 81 yards, 7:38.**
- TEN – Joey Slye 37-yard field goal, 0:00. Eagles 14–10. **Drive: 8 plays, 51 yards, 1:49.**

**Third quarter**

- PHI – Jake Elliott 58-yard field goal, 8:08. Eagles 17–10. **Drive: 7 plays, 16 yards, 2:00.**
- TEN – Cam Ward 1-yard run (Joey Slye kick), Tied 17–17. **Drive: 12 plays, 69 yards, 7:11.**

**Fourth quarter**

- TEN – Joey Slye 33-yard field goal, 1:56. Titans 20–17. **Drive: 10 plays, 69 yards, 4:04.**
- PHI – Darius Cooper 3-yard pass from Jalen Hurts (Jake Elliott kick), 0:09. Eagles 24–20. **Drive: 9 plays, 65 yards, 1:47.**

**Top passers**

- PHI – Jalen Hurts – 26/37, 264 yards, 2 TD, 2INT
- TEN – Cam Ward – 13/20, 183 yards

**Top rushers**

- PHI – Tank Bigsby – 13 rushes, 33 yards, TD
- TEN – Tony Pollard – 14 rushes, 64 yards

**Top receivers**

- PHI – Devonta Smith – 10 receptions, 117 yards, TD
- TEN – Elic Ayomanor – 2 receptions, 69 yards

The Eagles and Titans played a back and forth game with numerous lead changes throughout. Late in the contest, with the score tied at 17, the Titans reached first and goal at the Eagles' 9-yard line, but a sack by Jalen Carter forced them to settle for a field goal, taking a 20–17 lead. Philadelphia marched down the field and Darius Cooper eventually scored to put the Eagles ahead 24–20 with nine seconds remaining. While the Titans did reach midfield, Cam Ward’s throw under pressure was incomplete, sealing the win for Philadelphia. The Eagles also earned their first-ever win in Tennessee, having lost in their three previous visits to Nissan Stadium. The victory also marked their first road win against the Titans since 1991, back when they were the Houston Oilers.

==== Week 3: at Chicago Bears ====
Week 3: Philadelphia Eagles at Chicago Bears – Game summary

| Quarter | 1 | 2 | 3 | 4 | Total |
|---|---|---|---|---|---|
| Eagles | 0 | 7 | 0 | 0 | **7** |
| **Bears** | 7 | 3 | 10 | 7 | **27** |

at Soldier Field, Chicago, Illinois

- Date: September 28
- Game time: 8:15 p.m. EDT/7:15 p.m. CDT
- Game weather: Clear, 64 °F (18 °C)
- Game attendance: 59,588
- Referee: Shawn Hochuli
- TV announcers (ESPN/ABC): Joe Buck, Troy Aikman, Lisa Salters and Laura Rutledge
- Recap, Game Book

Game information

**First quarter**

- CHI – Luther Burden III 8-yard pass from Case Keenum (Cairo Santos kick), 8:47. Bears 7–0. **Drive: 11 plays, 66 yards, 6:13.**

**Second quarter**

- CHI – Cairo Santos 29-yard field goal, 1:52. Bears 10–0. **Drive: 11 plays, 69 yards, 4:22.**
- PHI – Jalen Hurts 1-yard run (Cairo Santos kick), 0:00. Bears 10–7. **Drive: 8 plays, 67 yards, 1:52.**

**Third quarter**

- CHI – Cairo Santos 48-yard field goal, 10:17. Bears 13–7. **Drive: 7 plays, 38 yards, 3:11.**
- CHI – Kalif Raymond 41-yard pass from Case Keenum (Cairo Santos kick), 5:47. Bears 20–7. **Drive: 5 plays, 71 yards, 2:49.**

**Fourth quarter**

- CHI – Case Keenum 1-yard run (Cairo Santos kick), 7:19. Bears 27–7. **Drive: 13 plays, 58 yards, 8:04.**

**Top passers**

- PHI – Jalen Hurts – 16/25, 153 yards, INT
- CHI – Case Keenum – 24/34, 247 yards, 2 TD

**Top rushers**

- PHI – Saquon Barkley – 15 rushes, 82 yards
- CHI – D'Andre Swift – 20 rushes, 84 yards

**Top receivers**

- PHI – Devonta Smith – 6 receptions, 65 yards
- CHI – Kalif Raymond – 6 receptions, 90 yards, TD

Philadelphia fell behind 10–0 early before scoring a tush push touchdown as time expired to end the half. That turned out to be the Eagles' only score of the game, as Chicago scored 17 unanswered points for a 27–7 win. For the first time since 1973, the Eagles failed to get a turnover in each of their first three games.

This marked the team's second straight loss to the Bears.

==== Week 4: vs. Los Angeles Rams ====
Week 4: Los Angeles Rams at Philadelphia Eagles – Game summary

| Quarter | 1 | 2 | 3 | 4 | Total |
|---|---|---|---|---|---|
| **Rams** | 3 | 7 | 0 | 14 | **24** |
| Eagles | 3 | 17 | 0 | 0 | **20** |

at Lincoln Financial Field, Philadelphia, Pennsylvania

- Date: October 4
- Game time: 1:00 p.m. EDT
- Game weather: Rain, 62 °F (17 °C)
- Game attendance: 69,879
- Referee: Craig Wrolstad
- TV announcers (Fox): Kevin Burkhardt, Tom Brady, Erin Andrews and Tom Rinaldi
- Recap, Game Book

Game information

**First quarter**

- PHI – Jake Elliott 29-yard field goal, 8:38. Eagles 3–0. **Drive: 6 plays, 17 yards, 3:10.**
- LAR – Harrison Mevis 40-yard field goal, 2:08. Tied 3–3. **Drive: 13 plays, 58 yards, 6:30.**

**Second quarter**

- PHI – Jake Elliott 56-yard field goal, 10:56. Eagles 6–3. **Drive: 12 plays, 29 yards, 6:12.**
- PHI – Darius Cooper 18-yard pass from Jalen Hurts (Jake Elliott kick), 5:44. Eagles 13–3. **Drive: 2 plays, 17 yards, 0:42.**
- LAR – Puka Nacua 2-yard run (Harrison Mevis kick), 1:55. Eagles 13–10. **Drive: 9 plays, 67 yards, 3:49.**
- PHI – Darius Cooper 10-yard pass from Jalen Hurts (Jake Elliott kick), 0:03. Eagles 20–10. **Drive: 2 plays, 35 yards, 0:15.**

**Third quarter**

- No scoring plays

**Fourth quarter**

- LAR – Kyren Williams 1-yard run (Harrison Mevis kick), 3:59. Eagles 20–17. **Drive: 19 plays, 98 yards, 3:27.**
- LAR – Kyren Williams 7-yard run (Harrison Mevis kick), 1:10. Rams 24–20. **Drive: 10 plays, 79 yards, 1:45.**

**Top passers**

- LAR – Matthew Stafford – 32/51, 317 yards, 2 INT
- PHI – Jalen Hurts – 12/27, 93 yards, 2 TD

**Top rushers**

- LAR – Kyren Williams – 16 rushes, 80 yards, 2 TD
- PHI – Tank Bigsby – 14 rushes, 55 yards

**Top receivers**

- LAR – Puka Nacua – 9 receptions, 125 yards
- PHI – Darius Cooper – 3 receptions, 33 yards, 2 TD

Despite leading 20–10 at halftime, Philadelphia was shutout in the second half as Los Angeles scored 14 unanswered points to seal the 24–20 victory and hand the Eagles their first loss to the Rams since 2020. The Eagles were also heavily stymied, both on the ground and in the air, being outgained 415–172 (68 passing yards and 104 rushing yards), as well as failing to convert a single third down.

==== Week 5: at Jacksonville Jaguars ====
NFL London games

Week 5: Philadelphia Eagles at Jacksonville Jaguars – Game summary

| Quarter | 1 | 2 | 3 | 4 | Total |
|---|---|---|---|---|---|
| Eagles | 0 | 14 | 0 | 3 | **17** |
| **Jaguars** | 7 | 0 | 3 | 9 | **19** |

at Tottenham Hotspur Stadium, London, England

- Date: October 11
- Game time: 2:30 p.m. BST/9:30 a.m. EDT
- Game weather: Mostly sunny, 60 °F (16 °C)
- Game attendance: 61,322
- Referee: Ronald Torbert
- TV announcers (NFLN): Dave Pasch, Kurt Warner, Jason Kelce and Molly McGrath
- Recap, Game Book

Game information

**First quarter**

- JAX – Parker Washington 51-yard pass from Trevor Lawrence (Cam Little kick), 5:26. Jaguars 7–0. **Drive: 3 plays, 63 yards, 1:26.**

**Second quarter**

- PHI – Will Shipley 2-yard run (Jake Elliott kick), 8:46. Tied 7–7. **Drive: 13 plays, 74 yards, 7:27.**
- PHI – Darius Cooper 62-yard pass from Jalen Hurts (Jake Elliott kick), 5:31. Eagles 14–7. **Drive: 3 plays, 62 yards, 0:55.**

**Third quarter**

- JAX – Cam Little 34-yard field goal, 7:11. Eagles 14–10. **Drive: 11 plays 69 yards, 6:20.**

**Fourth quarter**

- JAX – Parker Washington 27-yard pass from Trevor Lawrence (kick failed), 3:20. Jaguars 16–14. **Drive: 5 plays, 51 yards, 2:07.**
- PHI – Jake Elliott 48-yard field goal, 0:08. Eagles 17–16. **Drive: 9 plays, 32 yards, 1:27.**
- JAX – Cam Little 57-yard field goal, 0:00. Jaguars 19–17. **Drive: 1 play, 0 yards, 0:08.**

**Top passers**

- PHI – Jalen Hurts – 21/40, 220 yards, TD
- JAX – Trevor Lawrence – 24/39, 331 yards, 2 TD, INT

**Top rushers**

- PHI – Dameon Pierce – 11 rushes, 14 yards
- JAX – Bhayshul Tuten – 22 rushes, 72 yards

**Top receivers**

- PHI – Darius Cooper – 2 receptions, 71 yards, TD
- JAX – Parker Washington – 6 receptions, 124 yards, 2 TD

The Eagles and Jaguars played a back and forth game, with Jacksonville leading 7–0 after the first quarter and Philadelphia holding a 14–10 lead after the third quarter. However, with 3 minutes and 20 seconds remaining, Parker Washington scored a touchdown from 27 yards out, although the extra point missing kept Jacksonville’s lead to two. After both teams traded punts, the Eagles kicked a 48-yard field goal to take a 17–16 lead with just eight seconds left. However, Jacksonville responded with a 53-yard kickoff return from Ameer Abdullah and a 57-yard field goal from Cam Little to win the game 19–17. For the first time since 2021, the Eagles fell below .500 following the loss.

This marked the Eagles' first loss to Jacksonville since 2006 and their first ever loss outside of America.

==== Week 6: vs. Carolina Panthers ====
Week 6: Carolina Panthers at Philadelphia Eagles – Game summary

| Quarter | 1 | 2 | 3 | 4 | Total |
|---|---|---|---|---|---|
| **Panthers** | 3 | 7 | 3 | 12 | **25** |
| Eagles | 0 | 7 | 0 | 7 | **14** |

at Lincoln Financial Field, Philadelphia, Pennsylvania

- Date: October 18
- Game time: 1:00 p.m. EDT
- Game weather: Sunny, 53 °F (12 °C)
- Game attendance: 69,879
- Referee: John Hussey
- TV announcers (CBS): Ian Eagle, Ross Tucker, and Evan Washburn
- Recap, Game Book

Game information

**First quarter**

- CAR – Ryan Fitzgerald 47-yard field goal, 10:50. Panthers 3–0. **Drive: 6 plays, 32 yards, 2:38.**

**Second quarter**

- CAR – Tommy Tremble 12-yard pass from Bryce Young (Ryan Fitzergerald kick), 8:08. Panthers 10–0. **Drive: 5 plays, 35 yards, 1:24.**
- PHI – Dameon Pierce 2-yard run (Jake Elliott kick), 2:42. Panthers 10–7. **Drive: 10 plays, 78 yards, 5:26.**

**Third quarter**

- CAR – Ryan Fitzgerald 52-yard field goal, 11:32. Panthers 13–7. **Drive: 12 plays, 36 yards, 3:28.**

**Fourth quarter**

- CAR – Chuba Hubbard 1-yard run (pass failed), 13:34. Panthers 19–7. **Drive: 14 plays, 92 yards, 7:43.**
- PHI – DeVonta Smith 19-yard pass from Tanner McKee (Jake Elliott kick), 10:42. Panthers 19–14. **Drive: 10 plays, 69 yards, 2:52.**
- CAR – Tommy Tremble 19-yard pass from Bryce Young (kick failed), 6:33. Panthers 25–14. **Drive: 4 plays, 48 yards, 1:51.**

**Top passers**

- CAR – Bryce Young – 20/39, 281 yards, 2 TD
- PHI – Tanner McKee – 26/45, 215 yards, TD

**Top rushers**

- CAR – Chuba Hubbard – 28 rushes, 120 yards, TD
- PHI – Dameon Pierce – 12 rushes, 35 yards, TD

**Top receivers**

- CAR – Jalen Coker – 6 receptions, 97 yards
- PHI – DeVonta Smith – 7 receptions, 75 yards, TD

With their first loss to Carolina since 2018, the Eagles secured their first 4-game losing streak since 2020. This was despite the Panthers committing 13 penalties for 149 yards. The Eagles were dealt another major blow the next day as quarterback Jalen Hurts was ruled out for the rest of the season after blood clots were discovered in his lungs.

==== Week 7: vs. Dallas Cowboys ====
Week 7: Dallas Cowboys at Philadelphia Eagles – Game summary

| Quarter | 1 | 2 | 3 | 4 | Total |
|---|---|---|---|---|---|
| **Cowboys** | 10 | 10 | 8 | 10 | **38** |
| Eagles | 7 | 7 | 7 | 0 | **21** |

at Lincoln Financial Field, Philadelphia, Pennsylvania

- Date: October 26
- Game time: 8:15 p.m. EST
- Game weather: Clear, 59 °F (15 °C)
- Game attendance: 69,879
- Referee: Alex Kemp
- TV announcers (ESPN/ABC): Joe Buck, Troy Aikman and Lisa Salters
- Recap, Game Book

Game information

**First quarter**

- DAL – Brandon Aubrey 55-yard field goal, 12:30. Cowboys 3–0. **Drive: 7 plays, 28 yards, 2:30.**
- PHI – Saquon Barkley 8-yard run (Jake Elliott kick), 10:25. Eagles 7–3. **Drive: 4 plays, 75 yards, 2:08.**
- DAL – CeeDee Lamb 9-yard pass from Dak Prescott (Brandon Aubrey kick), 5:32. Cowboys 10–7. **Drive: 9 plays, 82 yards, 4:53.**

**Second quarter**

- PHI – Dameon Pierce 5-yard run (Jake Elliott kick), 13:25. Eagles 14–10. **Drive: 13 plays, 76 yards, 7:07.**
- DAL – George Pickens 21-yard pass from Dak Prescott (Brandon Aubrey kick), 5:37. Cowboys 17–14. **Drive: 14 plays, 81 yards, 7:48.**
- DAL – Brandon Aubrey 27-yard field goal, 0:00. Cowboys 20–14. **Drive: 8 plays, 78 yards, 1:14.**

**Third quarter**

- PHI – Makai Lemon 4-yard pass from Tanner McKee (Brandon Aubrey kick), 5:44. Eagles 21–20. **Drive: 17 plays, 84 yards, 9:16.**
- DAL – CeeDee Lamb 16-yard pass from Dak Prescott (Dak Prescott run), 1:30. Cowboys 28–21. **Drive: 9 plays, 61 yards, 4:14.**

**Fourth quarter**

- DAL – Brandon Aubrey 24-yard field goal, 9:10. Cowboys 31–21. **Drive: 9 plays, 78 yards, 5:07.**
- DAL – Javonte Williams 2-yard run (Brandon Aubrey kick), 2:21. Cowboys 38–21. **Drive: 6 plays, 16 yards, 2:27.**

**Top passers**

- DAL – Dak Prescott – 15/27, 212 yards, 3 TD
- PHI – Tanner McKee – 23/35, 211 yards, TD, INT

**Top rushers**

- DAL – Javonte Williams – 25 rushes, 155 yards, TD
- PHI – Saquon Barkley – 7 rushes, 62 yards, TD

**Top receivers**

- DAL – CeeDee Lamb – 5 receptions, 72 yards, 2 TD
- PHI – Makai Lemon – 7 receptions, 67 yards, 2 TD

While the game was back and forth for the first three quarters, with the Eagles maintaining a 21–20 lead late in the third, the defense collapsed and the Cowboys won 38–21. This marked the Eagles' first five-game losing streak since 2016, and their first home loss to Dallas since 2021.

==== Week 8: at Washington Commanders ====
Week 8: Philadelphia Eagles at Washington Commanders – Game summary

| Quarter | 1 | 2 | 3 | 4 | Total |
|---|---|---|---|---|---|
| Eagles | 10 | 0 | 0 | 0 | **10** |
| **Commanders** | 3 | 10 | 3 | 11 | **27** |

at Northwest Stadium, Landover, Maryland

- Date: November 1
- Game time: 8:20 p.m. EST
- Game weather: Fair, 51 °F (11 °C)
- Game attendance: 64,195
- Referee: Shawn Hochuli
- TV announcers (NBC): Mike Tirico, Cris Collinsworth and Melissa Stark
- Recap, Game Book

Game information

**First quarter**

- PHI – Jake Elliott 40-yard field goal, 6:10. Eagles 3–0. **Drive: 7 plays, 40 yards, 3:30.**
- PHI – Saquon Barkley 3-yard rush (Jake Elliott kick), 4:27. Eagles 10–0. **Drive: 3 plays, 26 yards, 1:02.**
- WSH – Drew Stevens 56-yard field goal, 0:28. Eagles 10–3. **Drive: 10 plays, 27 yards, 3:59.**

**Second quarter**

- WSH – Stefon Diggs 8-yard pass from Jayden Daniels (Drew Stevens kick), 4:56. Tied 10–10. **Drive: 11 plays, 89 yards, 5:50.**
- WSH – Drew Stevens 39-yard field goal, 0:19. Commanders 13–10. **Drive: 5 plays, 29 yards, 0:31.**

**Third quarter**

- WSH – Drew Stevens 25-yard field goal, 1:33. Commanders 16–10. **Drive: 5 plays, 53 yards, 1:18.**

**Fourth quarter**

- WSH – Drew Stevens 42-yard field goal, 3:43. Commanders 19–10. **Drive: 8 plays, 45 yards, 5:15.**
- WSH – Rachaad White 1-yard rush (Austin Ekeler run), 0:28. Commanders 27–10. **Drive: 3 plays, 37 yards, 0:26.**

**Top passers**

- PHI – Tanner McKee – 23/34, 212 yards, INT
- WSH – Jayden Daniels – 16/29, 217 yards, TD

**Top rushers**

- PHI – Elijah Mitchell – 11 rushes, 34 yards
- WSH – Rachaad White – 11 rush, 55 yards, TD

**Top receivers**

- PHI – Makai Lemon – 6 receptions, 57 yards
- WSH – Treylon Burks – 3 receptions, 81 yards

While Philadelphia jumped out to an immediate 10–0 lead, the Commanders scored 27 unanswered points to hand the Eagles their sixth consecutive loss, their first losing streak this long since 2012, and dropped to 2–6 for the first time since 1999.

==== Week 9: vs. New York Giants ====
Week 9: New York Giants at Philadelphia Eagles – Game summary

| Quarter | 1 | 2 | 3 | 4 | Total |
|---|---|---|---|---|---|
| **Giants** | 6 | 0 | 7 | 6 | **19** |
| Eagles | 8 | 0 | 0 | 3 | **11** |

at Lincoln Financial Field, Philadelphia, Pennsylvania

- Date: November 8
- Game time: 1:00 p.m. EST
- Game weather: Sunny, 57 °F (14 °C)
- Game attendance: 69,879
- Referee: Bill Vinovich
- TV announcers (Fox): Joe Davis, Greg Olsen and Pam Oliver
- Recap, Game Book

Game information

**First quarter**

- NYG – Dominic Zvada 53-yard field goal, 10:30. Giants 3–0. **Drive: 10 plays, 46 yards, 4:30.**
- NYG – Dominic Zvada 49-yard field goal, 5:31. Giants 6–0. **Drive: 7 plays, 23 yards, 3:29.**
- PHI – Saquon Barkley 3-yard run (Joe Milton III run), 2:09. Eagles 8–6. **Drive: 8 plays, 58 yards, 3:22.**

**Second quarter**

- No scoring plays

**Third quarter**

- NYG – Isaiah Likely 5-yard pass from Jameis Winston (Dominic Zvada kick), 2:25. Giants 13–8. **Drive: 14 plays, 76 yards, 7:56.**

**Fourth quarter**

- NYG – Dominic Zvada 38-yard field goal, 9:06. Giants 16–8. **Drive: 13 plays, 54 yards, 6:11.**
- NYG – Dominic Zvada 49-yard field goal, 4:24. Giants 19–8. **Drive: 4 plays, 4 yards, 2:19.**
- PHI – Jake Elliott 45-yard field goal, 1:56. Giants 19–11. **Drive: 10 plays, 48 yards, 2:28.**

**Top passers**

- NYG – J. J. McCarthy – 12/19, 127 yards
- PHI – Joe Milton III – 18/34, 169 yards

**Top rushers**

- NYG – Devin Singletary – 21 rushes, 31 yards
- PHI – Joe Milton III – 9 rushes, 64 yards

**Top receivers**

- NYG – Darnell Mooney – 3 receptions, 54 yards
- PHI – Makai Lemon – 6 receptions, 61 yards

Despite an improved defensive effort, the Eagles could not put the Giants away. New York jumped out to a 6–0 lead via two field goals before Philadelphia answered with a touchdown for an 8–6 lead they would carry into the half. In the second half, the Giants offense sprung to life and outscored the Eagles 13–3 to hand Philadelphia its seventh straight defeat.

With the loss, the Eagles fell to the Giants at home for the first time since 2013, snapping a thirteen-game home winning streak over their rivals.

==== Week 11: vs. Pittsburgh Steelers ====
Week 11: Pittsburgh Steelers at Philadelphia Eagles – Game summary

| Quarter | 1 | 2 | 3 | 4 | Total |
|---|---|---|---|---|---|
| Steelers | 0 | 3 | 6 | 7 | **16** |
| **Eagles** | 13 | 0 | 3 | 3 | **19** |

at Lincoln Financial Field, Philadelphia, Pennsylvania

- Date: November 22
- Game time: 1:00 p.m. EST
- Game weather: Cloudy, 63 °F (17 °C)
- Game attendance: 69,879
- Referee: Land Clark
- TV announcers (CBS): Kevin Harlan, Trent Green and Melanie Collins
- Recap, Game Book

Game information

**First quarter**

- PHI – Jake Elliott 41-yard field goal, 10:01. Eagles 3–0. **Drive: 5 plays, 17 yards, 2:39.**
- PHI – Jake Elliott 29-yard field goal, 2:57. Eagles 6–0. **Drive: 9 plays, 58 yards, 4:53.**
- PHI – Saquon Barkley 38-yard rush (Jake Elliott kick), 0:35. Eagles 13–0. **Drive: 2 plays, 48 yards, 0:44.**

**Second quarter**

- PIT – Chris Boswell 25-yard field goal, 1:01. Eagles 13–3. **Drive: 17 plays, 77 yards, 8:22.**

**Third quarter**

- PIT – Chris Boswell 40-yard field goal, 13:55. Eagles 13–6. **Drive: 4 plays, 2 yards, 0:57.**
- PHI – Jake Elliott 53-yard field goal, 8:33. Eagles 16–6. **Drive: 6 plays, 20 yards, 2:32.**
- PIT – Chris Boswell 52-yard field goal, 4:48. Eagles 16–9. **Drive: 9 plays, 30 yards, 3:45.**

**Fourth quarter**

- PHI – Jake Elliott 55-yard field goal, 4:19. Eagles 19–9. **Drive: 9 plays, 34 yards, 4:20.**
- PIT – Max Hurleman 20-yard pass from Aaron Rodgers (Chris Boswell kick), 1:21. Eagles 19–16. **Drive: 13 plays, 72 yards, 2:58.**

**Top passers**

- PIT – Aaron Rodgers – 30/44, 227 yards, TD
- PHI – Joe Milton – 11/21, 141 yards

**Top rushers**

- PIT – Aaron Rodgers – 5 rushes, 29 yards
- PHI – Saquon Barkley – 17 rushes, 75 yards, TD

**Top receivers**

- PIT – Max Hurleman – 6 receptions, 61 yards, TD
- PHI – Darius Cooper – 4 receptions, 59 yards

==== Week 12: at Dallas Cowboys ====
Thanksgiving Day Games

Week 12: Philadelphia Eagles at Dallas Cowboys – Game summary

| Quarter | 1 | 2 | 3 | 4 | Total |
|---|---|---|---|---|---|
| Eagles | 0 | 0 | 0 | 0 | **0** |
| Cowboys | 0 | 0 | 0 | 0 | **0** |

at AT&T Stadium, Arlington, Texas

- Date: November 26
- Game time: 4:30 p.m. EST/3:30 p.m. CST
- Game weather: TBD (retractable roof stadium)
- TV announcers (Fox): Kevin Burkhardt, Tom Brady, Erin Andrews and Tom Rinaldi
- Preview

=== Standings ===
==== Division ====
NFC East
| | W | L | T | PCT | DIV | CONF | PF | PA | STK |
|---|---|---|---|---|---|---|---|---|---|
| New York Giants | 5 | 3 | 1 | .611 | 2–1–1 | 3–3–1 | 203 | 196 | L1 |
| Dallas Cowboys | 5 | 6 | 0 | .455 | 2–1 | 2–5 | 337 | 312 | W1 |
| Washington Commanders | 3 | 5 | 1 | .389 | 2–2–1 | 3–4–1 | 196 | 223 | W1 |
| Philadelphia Eagles | 3 | 7 | 0 | .300 | 1–3 | 1–6 | 167 | 237 | W1 |

==== Conference ====
NFC
| Seed | Team | Division | W | L | T | PCT | DIV | CONF | SOS | SOV | STK |
|---|---|---|---|---|---|---|---|---|---|---|---|
**Division leaders**
| 1 | San Francisco 49ers | West | 8 | 1 | 0 | .889 | 3–0 | 5–1 | .428 | .444 | W2 |
| 2 (Note: Detroit wins tie break over Chicago based on division record.) | Detroit Lions | North | 8 | 2 | 0 | .800 | 2–0 | 5–1 | .440 | .375 | W6 |
| 3 | New York Giants | East | 5 | 3 | 1 | .611 | 2–1–1 | 3–3–1 | .356 | .308 | L1 |
| 4 | Carolina Panthers | South | 5 | 5 | 0 | .500 | 2–1 | 4–3 | .510 | .412 | W2 |
**Wild cards**
| 5 | Chicago Bears | North | 8 | 2 | 0 | .800 | 0–2 | 6–2 | .434 | .375 | W5 |
| 6 | Minnesota Vikings | North | 7 | 2 | 0 | .778 | 3–1 | 5–1 | .516 | .423 | W1 |
| 7 (Note: Green Bay wins tie break over Seattle based on conference record. Division tie break was initially used to eliminate LA Rams (see below).) | Green Bay Packers | North | 6 | 4 | 0 | .600 | 1–3 | 4–4 | .535 | .459 | L1 |
**In the hunt**
| 8 (Note: Seattle wins tie break over LA Rams based on division record.) | Seattle Seahawks | West | 6 | 4 | 0 | .600 | 2–1 | 2–3 | .515 | .393 | W2 |
| 9 | Los Angeles Rams | West | 6 | 4 | 0 | .600 | 1–2 | 4–2 | .485 | .345 | W4 |
| 10 | Dallas Cowboys | East | 5 | 6 | 0 | .455 | 2–1 | 2–5 | .400 | .290 | W1 |
| 11 | Washington Commanders | East | 3 | 5 | 1 | .389 | 2–2–1 | 3–4–1 | .506 | .500 | W1 |
| 12 (Note: Tampa Bay wins tie break over Philadelphia based on conference record. Division tie break was initially used to eliminate Atlanta and New Orleans (see below).) (Note: Tampa Bay wins tie break over Atlanta and New Orleans based on head-to-head record.) | Tampa Bay Buccaneers | South | 3 | 7 | 0 | .300 | 2–0 | 3–4 | .616 | .419 | L2 |
| 13 (Note: Atlanta wins tie break over Philadephia based on conference record. Division tie break was initially used to eliminate New Orleans (see below).) (Note: Atlanta wins tie break over New Orleans based on head-to-head victory.) | Atlanta Falcons | South | 3 | 7 | 0 | .300 | 1–2 | 3–3 | .586 | .586 | L3 |
| 14 (Note: New Orleans wins tie break over Philadelphia based on conference record.) | New Orleans Saints | South | 3 | 7 | 0 | .300 | 0–2 | 1–5 | .571 | .517 | L2 |
| 15 | Philadelphia Eagles | East | 3 | 7 | 0 | .300 | 1–3 | 1–6 | .521 | .362 | W1 |
| 16 | Arizona Cardinals | West | 3 | 8 | 0 | .273 | 1–4 | 2–6 | .621 | .400 | L3 |
