= Ernie Adams (American football) =

American football coach and executive

Personal information
- Born: March 31, 1953 (age 73); Waltham, Massachusetts, U.S.

Career information
- High school: Phillips Academy (Andover, Massachusetts)
- College: Northwestern University

Career history

Coaching
- New England Patriots (1975–1978) Offensive assistant; New York Giants (1979–1981) Offensive assistant; Cleveland Browns (1991–1995) Offensive assistant; Phillips Academy (2026) Interim Head Coach

Operations
- Northwestern (1971–1974) Student assistant/scout; New England Patriots (1975–1978) Administrative assistant; New York Giants (1982–1985) Director of pro personnel; New England Patriots (2000–2021) Football research director

Awards and highlights
- 6× Super Bowl champion (XXXVI, XXXVIII, XXXIX, XLIX, LI, LIII)

Ernie Adams (born March 31, 1953) is an American former professional football coach and researcher best known for his years with the New England Patriots of the National Football League (NFL). He is a longtime friend and associate of head coach Bill Belichick, first meeting Belichick when they played high school football together. With Adams, the Patriots won six Super Bowls. Adams is renowned for his extremely thorough analysis of the game and low profile.

== Early life ==
Adams attended the Dexter School near Boston in Brookline, Massachusetts. Given his knowledge of football for his age, Adams was asked to coach the school's intramural football team as an eighth grader.

He later attended Phillips Academy in Andover, Massachusetts for high school. While there, he read Football Scouting Methods written by Steve Belichick, who was then a football scout for the United States Naval Academy. In 1970, Steve Belichick's son Bill enrolled at Phillips Academy for a post-graduate year after graduating from Annapolis High School. Adams, a senior, recognized Belichick's name and the two quickly became friends. At one point, they snuck into a Boston College football practice together to practice scouting.

Beginning in 1971, Adams attended Northwestern University in Evanston, Illinois. As a freshman, Adams sought a student assistant position for the Wildcats' football team and secured it after impressing an assistant coach with a report on a football formation. He would serve as a scout for Northwestern until his graduation in 1975 with a degree in education.

== Professional career ==
=== New England Patriots (first stint) ===
After his graduation from college, Adams pursued an unpaid position with the New England Patriots in 1975. After contacting then-head coach Chuck Fairbanks numerous times, Adams received a playbook from assistant coach Hank Bullough to learn; Adams learned it in two days, and was presented with another playbook, which he again learned in two days. Adams was hired as an offensive and administrative assistant, and eventually prepared scouting reports for the team, which Fairbanks said were the most thorough he had received in his career.

=== New York Giants ===
In 1979, Patriots assistant Ray Perkins was hired to be the head coach of the New York Giants. He promptly hired Adams as an offensive assistant, working with quarterbacks and receivers. Adams then convinced Perkins to hire Belichick as a special teams coach; Belichick had spent the previous eight years as a student at Wesleyan University and as an assistant coach for three NFL teams. Adams spent three seasons as the Giants' offensive assistant before moving to their scouting department as pro personnel director. By 1985, he had become frustrated with that job, and took a lucrative job offer as a municipal bonds trader on Wall Street.

=== Cleveland Browns ===
Adams left Wall Street to join the Cleveland Browns in 1991, where Belichick had just been named to his first NFL head coaching position. Adams was again an offensive assistant, working with tight ends and running backs. However, Belichick was fired by the franchise after the Browns moved to Baltimore and became the Ravens in 1996, and Adams returned to Wall Street, starting his own investment business.

=== New England Patriots (second stint) ===
Belichick got his next coaching opportunity with the Patriots in 2000. This time, Adams joined the team not as a coach, but as Football Research Director. Adams filled a variety of roles for the team. On gamedays, he assisted the coaching staff from the team's upper level skybox, where his duties included advising Belichick on which plays to issue a replay challenge. For many years, the Patriots' gameday communications system included a telephone handset labeled "ERNIE" that was mounted within easy reach of Belichick, other coaches and key players. He also assisted the scouting department in preparing for the NFL draft in the spring, and built the team's player value chart for the draft. Also, Adams worked on special assignments for the coaching and scouting staffs, which typically involve breaking down game tape. In 2007, as part of Spygate, it was revealed that Adams received tapes from a "third camera" that recorded opponents' defensive signals from a location on the sideline, in violation of a league memo issued by commissioner Roger Goodell. Belichick confirmed this was the case, but said that they were only a small part of the "mosaic" that formed the Patriots' offensive game plans at the time.

Adams and Belichick were known to have an interest in mathematical analyses of football; Adams once contacted Rutgers University statistics professor Harold Sackrowitz, asking him to evaluate the Patriots' two-point conversion chart following a study by Sackrowitz on the decision. Adams also presented Belichick with a study concluding teams punt too often on fourth down.

With the Patriots and throughout his career, Adams was known for keeping a low profile. Former Browns owner Art Modell notably quipped, "I'll pay anyone here $10,000 if they can tell me what Ernie Adams does."

On May 1, 2021, it was announced that the 2021 draft would end his tenure with the Patriots. His last day of work for the organization was at the conclusion of the offseason program on June 16, 2021, retiring afterwards.

== See also ==
- Dom DiSandro, another mostly behind-the-scenes figure who became a part of his team's culture with the Philadelphia Eagles
