= Ryan Mahaffey =

American football player and coach (born 1987)

Philadelphia Eagles
- Title: Run game coordinator & tight ends coach

Personal information
- Born: November 28, 1987 (age 38); Des Moines, Iowa, U.S.
- Listed height: 6 ft 2 in (1.88 m)
- Listed weight: 255 lb (116 kg)

Career information
- Position: Fullback (No. 47)
- High school: Grinnell (IA)
- College: Northern Iowa
- NFL draft: 2011: undrafted

Career history

Playing
- Baltimore Ravens (2011)*; Indianapolis Colts (2011); Miami Dolphins (2012)*
- * Offseason or practice squad member only

Coaching
- Northern Iowa (2013) Tight ends coach; Notre Dame (2014–2015) Graduate assistant; Northern Iowa (2016) Co-offensive coordinator & wide receivers coach; Western Kentucky (2017–2018) Tight ends coach; Northern Iowa (2019–2020) Offensive coordinator; Green Bay Packers (2021-2025); Offensive quality control coach (2021); Assistant offensive line coach (2022-2023); Wide receivers coach (2024-2025); Philadelphia Eagles (2026–present) Run game coordinator & tight ends coach
- Stats at Pro Football Reference

Ryan Mahaffey (born November 28, 1987) is an American football coach and former fullback who is run game coordinator for the Philadelphia Eagles of the National Football League (NFL). He was signed by the Baltimore Ravens as an undrafted free agent in 2011 and also played for the Indianapolis Colts (2011). He played college football for the Northern Iowa Panthers.

== Career ==
Pre-draft measurables
Height	Weight	40-yard dash	10-yard split	20-yard split	20-yard shuttle	Three-cone drill	Vertical jump	Broad jump	Bench press
6 ft 2 1/2 in (1.89 m)	247 lb (112 kg)	4.91 s	1.65 s	2.94 s	4.47 s	7.20 s	34.5 in (0.88 m)	9 ft 8 in (2.95 m)	20 reps
All values from Pro Day

On February 6, 2026, the Philadelphia Eagles hired Mahaffey to serve as the team's run game coordinator.
