= Uar Bernard =

Nigerian football player (born 2004)

No. 93 – Philadelphia Eagles
- Position: Defensive tackle
- Roster status: Practice squad

Personal information
- Born: October 10, 2004 (age 22); Abuja, Nigeria
- Listed height: 6 ft 5 in (1.96 m)
- Listed weight: 306 lb (139 kg)

Career information
- NFL draft: 2026: 7th round, 251st overall pick

Career history
- Philadelphia Eagles (2026–present)*
- * Offseason or practice squad member only
- Stats at Pro Football Reference

Uar Bernard (/ˈu.ɑːr/ OO-ar; born October 10, 2004) is a Nigerian professional football defensive tackle for the Philadelphia Eagles of the National Football League (NFL). He is a part of the International Player Pathway Program. Bernard was selected by the Eagles in the seventh round of the 2026 NFL draft.

== Early life ==
Bernard was born in Abuja, Nigeria. Bernard did not compete in any athletics until he discovered basketball when he was 16 years old, participating on both school and club basketball teams. He would later become involved in football and earn invitations to the 2024 NFL Nigeria camp and NFL Africa camp in Cairo in 2025. Eventually, Bernard would join the International Player Pathway in 2025.

== Professional career ==
Pre-draft measurables
Height	Weight	Arm length	Hand span	Wingspan	40-yard dash	10-yard split	20-yard split	20-yard shuttle	Three-cone drill	Vertical jump	Broad jump	Bench press
6 ft 4 5/8 in (1.95 m)	306 lb (139 kg)	35 3/4 in (0.91 m)	11 in (0.28 m)	7 ft 1 5/8 in (2.17 m)	4.63 s	1.58 s	2.68 s	4.57 s	8.13 s	39.0 in (0.99 m)	10 ft 10 in (3.30 m)	31 reps
All values from HBCU Combine/IPP Pro Day

=== Pre-draft ===
Before the 2026 NFL draft, he participated in the International Player Pathway Pro Day in front of NFL scouts, where he measured in at 6 feet and 4.5 inches at 306 pounds with just 6% body fat. He also performed well in drills; he ran a 4.63 40-yard dash, had a 39-inch vertical jump and a broad jump of ten feet, ten inches, earning a perfect 10.0 Relative Athletic Score. After his breakout performance, Bernard became an intriguing prospect for the 2026 draft. Despite his extraordinary athleticism, Bernard had yet to play a single snap of organized football in his life.

Bernard was selected by the Philadelphia Eagles in the seventh round with the 251st overall pick in the 2026 NFL draft. Eagles executive and general manager Howie Roseman said of Bernard, "We wanted to take a chance on [him]," and acknowledged, "it's going to take a lot of time." He officially signed a rookie scale contract for four years on May 1. Bernard was waived by the Eagles as a part of final roster cuts on August 30 and re-signed to the practice squad the next day.
