= John Ojukwu =

American football player (born 1999)

No. 67 – Philadelphia Eagles
- Position: Offensive tackle
- Roster status: Active

Personal information
- Born: January 9, 1999 (age 27); Nampa, Idaho, U.S.
- Listed height: 6 ft 5 in (1.96 m)
- Listed weight: 309 lb (140 kg)

Career information
- High school: Boise (ID)
- College: Boise State (2017–2022)
- NFL draft: 2023: undrafted

Career history
- Tennessee Titans (2023–2025); Philadelphia Eagles (2026–present)

Awards and highlights
- First-team All-MW (2022)

Career NFL statistics as of 2025
- Games played: 16
- Games started: 9
- Stats at Pro Football Reference

John Ojukwu (born January 9, 1999) is an American professional football offensive tackle for the Philadelphia Eagles of the National Football League (NFL). He played college football for the Boise State Broncos and was signed by the Titans as an undrafted free agent in 2023.

== Early life ==
Ojukwu was born on January 9, 1999. He attended Boise High School and was a three-year starter at offensive tackle, earning two first-team all-conference honors as well as an all-state selection. As a junior, Ojukwu weighed only 185 pounds. Knowing that he needed to gain weight to have a chance in college, he ate large amounts of food and constantly worked out, gaining close to 100 pounds in nine months, with a diet that included a daily gallon of milk and sometimes whole pizzas. He was a three-star recruit and was ranked as the third-best prospect from Idaho, eventually committing to play college football for the Boise State Broncos.

== College career ==
Ojukwu redshirted his first season at Boise State, 2017. He began the 2018 season as a backup before being put into action against Nevada on October 13, and he never missed a start in the games he played afterwards for the rest of his college career. Ojukwu started the final seven games of the year at right tackle and finished the season having appeared in all 12 games. He remained starting right tackle in 2019, starting 11 games and helping block for an offense that was 14th-nationally in scoring. Ojukwu switched to being a left tackle in 2020 and was named second-team All-Mountain West Conference (MWC) while starting all seven games. In 2021, he started 12 games and earned first-team All-MWC honors while allowing four sacks and committing only one penalty.

In his final season, 2022, Ojukwu was the only Boise State player to start all 14 games on offense and allowed no sacks while committing just two penalties. He finished his stint with the Broncos having played close to 1,900 snaps, on which he allowed just 11 sacks, additionally allowing just eight quarterback hits in his final three seasons. He was invited to the NFLPA Collegiate Bowl and the East–West Shrine Bowl at the conclusion of his college career.

== Professional career ==
Pre-draft measurables
Height	Weight	Arm length	Hand span	Wingspan	40-yard dash	10-yard split	20-yard split	20-yard shuttle	Three-cone drill	Vertical jump	Broad jump	Bench press
6 ft 5 3/4 in (1.97 m)	309 lb (140 kg)	34 in (0.86 m)	10 3/4 in (0.27 m)	6 ft 11 5/8 in (2.12 m)	5.24 s	1.81 s	2.98 s	4.52 s	7.52 s	28.5 in (0.72 m)	8 ft 8 in (2.64 m)	26 reps
All values from NFL Combine/Pro Day

=== Tennessee Titans ===
Despite being projected by several sources as a late-round pick in the 2023 NFL draft, Ojukwu went unselected. Afterwards, he was signed by the Tennessee Titans as an undrafted free agent. He was waived on August 29, 2023. A day later, he was re-signed to the practice squad. On December 23, Ojukwu was signed to the 53-man roster. He finished the 2023 season having appeared in three games, each as a starter.

Ojukwu was waived by the Titans on October 8, 2024 and re-signed to the practice squad two days later. He was promoted back to the active roster on October 26. Ojukwu appeared in 11 games during the 2024 season as a rotational right tackle, making four starts.

On August 27, 2025, Ojukwu was waived by the Titans, and re-signed to the practice squad. He was signed to the active roster on September 20. Ojukwu was waived again on October 11 and re-signed to the practice squad three days later.

=== Philadelphia Eagles ===
On January 13, 2026, Ojukwu signed a reserve/future contract with the Philadelphia Eagles. He was waived by the Eagles on August 30 as a part of final roster cuts; he was re-signed to the practice squad the next day. He was promoted to the active roster on November 16.
