= Zion Wilson =

American football player (born 2004)

No. 78 – Philadelphia Eagles
- Position: Defensive tackle
- Roster status: Practice squad

Personal information
- Born: May 14, 2003 (age 23)
- Listed height: 6 ft 3 in (1.91 m)
- Listed weight: 316 lb (143 kg)

Career information
- High school: Northside (Pinetown, North Carolina)
- College: East Carolina (2021–2025)
- NFL draft: 2026: undrafted

Career history
- Philadelphia Eagles (2026)*
- * Offseason or practice squad member only

Awards and highlights
- First-team All-AAC (2025)
- Stats at Pro Football Reference

Zion Wilson (born May 14, 2003) is an American professional football defensive tackle for the Philadelphia Eagles of the National Football League (NFL). He played college football for the East Carolina Pirates.

== Early life ==
Wilson attended Northside High School in Pinetown, North Carolina. He had 44 tackles as a junior and 39 tackles as a senior, including 15 for loss. Wilson committed to play college football at East Carolina.

== College career ==
Wilson started out as a walk-on offensive lineman at East Carolina and redshirted his freshman season. He moved to the defensive line in 2024, though primarily saw the field on special teams. In 2025, Wilson recorded 42 tackles, 10 for loss, and seven sacks. He was named to the First Team All-American Athletic Conference. Wilson intended to transfer to play for Virginia in 2026 but his appeal for a sixth season of eligibility was denied by the NCAA.

== Professional career ==
After not being selected in the 2026 NFL draft, Marshall was signed by the Philadelphia Eagles as an undrafted free agent. He was waived by the Eagles on August 29. Wilson was signed to the Eagles practice squad on October 13.
