= Dom DiSandro =

American football staffer (born 1978/79)

Philadelphia Eagles
- Title: Senior advisor to the general manager, director of gameday coaching operations, chief security officer

Personal information
- Born: 1978 or 1979 (age 47–48); South Philadelphia, Pennsylvania, U.S.

Career information
- Position: Offensive lineman
- High school: George Washington (Philadelphia, Pennsylvania)
- College: Penn State

Career history
- Philadelphia Eagles (1999–present); Assistant to the chief security officer (1999–2011); Senior advisor to the general manager & chief security officer (2011–present); Director of gameday coaching operations (2024–present)

Awards and highlights
- 2× Super Bowl champion (LII, LIX)

Domenico DiSandro (born 1978 or 1979), nicknamed "Big Dom", is an American football employee who is the senior advisor to the general manager, director of gameday coaching operations and chief security officer for the Philadelphia Eagles of the National Football League (NFL).

== Early life ==
DiSandro is a second-generation Italian American with roots in Molise and was born in South Philadelphia in 1978 or 1979. He attended George Washington High School in Northeast Philadelphia and played football as an offensive lineman. He earned an athletic scholarship to play for the Penn State Nittany Lions but did not appear in any games, being dismissed from the team for unspecified reasons. He received a degree in sports management from Penn State.

== Career ==
DiSandro received a job recruiting from the Big East Conference for the Philadelphia Eagles in 1997 after meeting their general manager. According to The Philadelphia Inquirer, he "started assisting with small jobs and organically became the players' liaison, while [Butch] Buchanico, [the team's then-director of security], handled [coach Andy] Reid and high-level projects." DiSandro officially was hired by the Eagles in 1999 and worked in these roles until he was named the chief security officer one year after Buchanico retired in 2011. He also became the team's senior advisor to the general manager; according to the Eagles' website, in these roles he "oversees all safety and security matters for players, coaches, and executives," and "directs security at the team's training complex, is responsible for security measures related to team travel and logistics and provides education on the NFL's personal conduct policy." He has assisted the Eagles front office, including general manager Howie Roseman, with investigative work in scouting potential additions to the team.

Although considered a "mystery man" he has become popular among players and team fans. He has been described as a "central figure" and players have called him "family"; Jason Kelce gave him the nickname of "Papa Bear". DiSandro is known for being well-connected around the city of Philadelphia and has helped players navigate legal issues ranging from minor infractions such as parking tickets to issues involving arrests and criminal charges. The Inquirer described him as "the 'Ray Donovan' fixer, 'I got a guy' of the Eagles. Most of the requests are benign and tedious." DiSandro also works with players on personal matters such as mental health struggles, expediting the acquisition of passports, wedding planning and provides private security when Eagles players attend Philadelphia Phillies or Philadelphia 76ers games.

DiSandro released merchandise during the 2023 NFL season to support the Eagles Autism Foundation. In a game during Week 13 of the 2023 season against the San Francisco 49ers, he was involved in a scuffle with 49ers player Dre Greenlaw that resulted in both being ejected from the game; DiSandro received a standing ovation from fans. Walt Anderson, the NFL senior vice president of officiating, stated that DiSandro's disqualification from the game was warranted as he "was contributing to that escalation." Eagles head coach Nick Sirianni apologized to 49ers head coach Kyle Shanahan for the incident after the game. However, Sirianni defended DiSandro, saying, "He's going to always try to defuse situations... That's what he does. That's his job." Although he and Greenlaw exchanged apologies through intermediaries afterwards, the NFL decided to ban DiSandro from the sidelines for the subsequent game against the Dallas Cowboys, and then for the rest of the regular season. He also received a $100,000 fine; the team's appeal of the sanctions was denied.

On June 9, 2024, the Eagles added the title of Director of Gameday Coaching Operations to DiSandro's role. During the 2025 season, he faced a $75,000 fine for using his phone inside the bench area during a preseason game against the Jets on August 22nd.

He has been a part of two Super Bowl winning teams for the Eagles in the 2017 and 2024 seasons. DiSandro gave brief remarks at the Super Bowl parade for the 2024 team. DiSandro also spoke at the Eagles visit to the White House in 2025.

On May 4, 2026, the Eagles announced that they had reached an agreement with DiSandro on an undisclosed contract extension.

== See also ==
- Ernie Adams, another mostly behind the scenes man who became a piece of culture, albeit for the New England Patriots
