= Darius Cooper =

American football player (born 2001)

No. 80 – Philadelphia Eagles
- Position: Wide receiver
- Roster status: Active

Personal information
- Born: November 22, 2001 (age 24); St. Louis, Missouri, U.S.
- Listed height: 5 ft 11 in (1.80 m)
- Listed weight: 210 lb (95 kg)

Career information
- High school: Hazelwood West (Hazelwood, Missouri)
- College: Tarleton State (2020–2024)
- NFL draft: 2025: undrafted

Career history
- Philadelphia Eagles (2025–present)

Awards and highlights
- First-team FCS All-American (2024)

Career NFL statistics as of Week 9, 2026
- Receptions: 22
- Receiving yards: 292
- Receiving touchdowns: 4
- Stats at Pro Football Reference

Darius Cooper (born November 22, 2001) is an American professional football wide receiver for the Philadelphia Eagles of the National Football League (NFL). He played college football for the Tarleton State Texans and was signed by the Eagles as an undrafted free agent in 2025.

== Early life ==
Cooper is from Hazelwood, Missouri. He attended Hazelwood West High School where he played football as a quarterback, throwing for 1,275 yards and 15 touchdowns while running for 870 yards and 11 touchdowns as a senior. He committed to play college football for the Tarleton State Texans, having been lightly recruited coming out of high school.

== College career ==
As a freshman at Tarleton State in 2020, Cooper appeared in six games and caught one pass for six yards. He caught five passes for 38 yards and a touchdown in 2021. In 2022, he had a breakout year and caught 54 passes for 1,063 yards and nine touchdowns. He was named first-team All-Western Athletic Conference (WAC) for his performance in 2022, then earned second-team All-United Athletic Conference (UAC) honors in 2023 after catching 28 passes for 622 yards and five touchdowns. In his last season, 2024, Cooper had his best year, finishing second in the NCAA Division I in receiving yards while totaling 76 receptions for 1,450 yards and 14 touchdowns, an average of 19.1 yards-per-catch. Cooper was selected first-team All-UAC and a first-team FCS All-American.

== Professional career ==
Pre-draft measurables
Height	Weight	Arm length	Hand span	Wingspan	40-yard dash	10-yard split	20-yard split	20-yard shuttle	Three-cone drill	Vertical jump	Broad jump	Bench press
5 ft 11 1/8 in (1.81 m)	213 lb (97 kg)	32 1/2 in (0.83 m)	9 7/8 in (0.25 m)	6 ft 6 in (1.98 m)	4.49 s	1.64 s	2.57 s	4.20 s	7.11 s	38.0 in (0.97 m)	10 ft 6 in (3.20 m)	18 reps
All values from Pro Day

After going unselected in the 2025 NFL draft, Cooper signed with the Philadelphia Eagles as an undrafted free agent. In his first preseason game with the team, he posted a team-leading six catches for 82 yards and a touchdown. Cooper subsequently made the team's 53-man roster to begin the season. On September 24, 2025, Cooper was placed on injured reserve due to a shoulder injury. On October 25, 2025, Cooper was activated from injured reserve.

Cooper caught his first career touchdown pass against the Tennessee Titans in Week 2 of the 2026 season in a 24–20 victory; he recorded the TD on the game-winning drive with nine seconds left in the fourth quarter. It was the Eagles’ first road win against the Titans since 1991.

In Week 4 against The Los Angeles Rams, Cooper had two receiving touchdowns, one for 18 yards, and the other for 10 yards. Both of them occurred in the second quarter of the game. He finished the game with a total of 33 receiving yards.

In Week 5 against the Jacksonville Jaguars in London, England, Cooper recorded 2 receptions on 3 targets for 71 receiving yards, and a 62 yard touchdown in the second quarter.
