= Josh Weru =

- Born: Joshua Weru; October 3, 2003 (age 23) Nairobi, Kenya
- Height: 6 ft 4 in (193 cm)
- Weight: 17 st 6 lb (111 kg)
- University: Loughborough University

Rugby union career
- Position: Backrow
- Current team: US Dax
Youth career
- 2017-2022: Northampton Saints
International career
Years	Team	Apps	(Points)
2020	Kenya u20		
2022	Kenya	3	(5)
- Correct as of 19 March 2025
- Football career

No. 46 – Philadelphia Eagles
- Position: Outside linebacker
- Roster status: Active

Career information
- NFL draft: 2026: undrafted

Career history
- Philadelphia Eagles (2026–present)*
- * Offseason or practice squad member only

Joshua Weru is an international rugby union player, who plays for the Kenyan National Team as a Number 8. He is also an outside linebacker for the Philadelphia Eagles of the National Football League (NFL).

== Career ==
At 14 years old, Weru joined the Northampton Saints Academy.

On the 3 August 2022, Josh Weru signed a professional contract with Northampton Saints after graduating from their Under-18 set up. His main strength was his ball carrying ability with academy coach, Will Parkin saying: “His ball-carrying ability is amongst the very best we've seen at Under-18s level”.

Unfortunately, late in 2022 he lost his contract with Northampton, before he managed to debut for the senior team, due to his aspirations to play for the Kenyan National Team. Under the RFU's eligibility criteria, to secure a working visa to play professional rugby, a player from a Tier 3 nation (such as Kenya) has to have a minimum of 10 international Test caps, of which three must be played during the previous 24 months.

In December 2025, Weru was named to the NFL's International Player Pathway program, making him a prospect in the 2026 NFL Draft.

Pre-draft measurables
Height	Weight	Arm length	Hand span	Wingspan	40-yard dash	10-yard split	20-yard split	20-yard shuttle	Three-cone drill	Vertical jump	Broad jump	Bench press
6 ft 4 in (1.93 m)	244 lb (111 kg)	33 1/4 in (0.84 m)	9 1/4 in (0.23 m)	6 ft 7 3/4 in (2.03 m)	4.45 s	1.59 s	2.63 s	4.35 s	7.66 s	41.5 in (1.05 m)	11 ft 2 in (3.40 m)	18 reps
All values from HBCU Combine/IPP Pro Day

In April 2026 Weru was signed by the Philadelphia Eagles of the NFL as an undrafted free agent. He was waived by the Eagles as a part of final roster cuts on August 30; he was re-signed to the team's practice squad the next day.

== International career ==
In 2020 at only 16 years old Weru was called up to the Kenya U20s squad by Simbas head coach Paul Odera.

In 2022 Weru was called up to Kenyan National Team for the 2023 Rugby World Cup Final Qualification Tournament, where he scored on debut. Coming off the bench to run a 60-metre try in Kenyas 68–14 loss to the USA. Weru earned 2 more caps in the remaining matches in the tournament, against Portugal (in which he started at Number 8) and Hong Kong.

=== International tries ===
Try	Opposing team	Location	Venue	Competition	Date	Result	Score
1	United States	Dubai, UAE	The Sevens Stadium	2023 Rugby World Cup Repechage	6 November 2022	Loss	68-14
