= Isiah King =

American football player

No. 37 – Edmonton Elks
- Position: Linebacker
- Roster status: Practice roster
- CFL status: American

Personal information
- Born: San Diego, California, U.S.
- Listed height: 6 ft 3 in (1.91 m)
- Listed weight: 215 lb (98 kg)

Career information
- High school: Montgomery (San Diego)
- College: Idaho (2021–2025)
- NFL draft: 2026: undrafted

Career history
- Philadelphia Eagles (2026)*; Edmonton Elks (2026–present)
- * Offseason or practice squad member only

Awards and highlights
- Grey Cup champion (2026); First-team All-Big Sky (2025)
- Stats at ESPN

Isiah King is an American professional football linebacker. He played college football for the Idaho Vandals.

== Early life ==
King was born and raised in San Diego, California. He took up football after falling in love with the sport by watching his older brother play. King attended Montgomery High School in San Diego, where he played wide receiver and safety on the football team. As a junior, he earned first-team all-league honors after posting 27 receptions for 397 yards and eight touchdowns on offense to go with 25 tackles and three interceptions on defense. Despite his senior season being shortened due to the COVID-19 pandemic, (Note: Montgomery's 2020 season consisted of a shortened five-game schedule in the spring of 2021.) he was named the South Bay League Defensive Player of the Year after recording three interceptions to go with seven catches for 131 yards and four touchdowns.

King was rated as a three-star recruit and the 255th-best player in the state of California in the class of 2021, according to 247Sports. On August 4, 2020, he verbally committed to playing college football at the University of Idaho over offers from Morgan State and Lake Erie. King described how he was unable to visit the school, (Note: The NCAA imposed a recruiting dead period due to the COVID-19 pandemic, during which schools were prohibited from in-person interactions with recruits.) instead having to watch YouTube videos of the campus. He signed with the Idaho Vandals on National Signing Day in December.

== College career ==
As a freshman in 2021, King played three games for the Vandals and took a redshirt season. He lined up at the safety position and recorded 20 tackles to go along with a 20-yard reception. After the hire of new head coach Jason Eck, King was converted to a linebacker in 2022. That season, he posted 19 tackles and an interception in six games played. In 2023, King tallied two tackles in seven games played. In 2024, he racked up 48 tackles, two interceptions, and a sack in 13 games played, including an interception in the FCS quarterfinals against Montana State. King earned all-Big Sky Conference honorable mention. He worked extensively on his tackling that offseason. King entered his final collegiate season in 2025 as the Vandals' most experienced returning linebacker following several transfers, becoming a full-time starter and a defensive leader. In the season opener, he recorded a career-high 10 tackles in their rivalry game against Washington State. King later equalled that mark in their Homecoming game against Northern Colorado. He finished the season with 79 tackles and three sacks, and was a first-team all-Big Sky selection.

King finished his five-year collegiate career at Idaho with 152 tackles, 13.5 tackles for loss, seven passes defended, four sacks, three interceptions, one forced fumble, and one fumble recovery.

== Professional career ==
Pre-draft measurables
| Height | Weight | Arm length | Hand span | Wingspan | 40-yard dash | 10-yard split | 20-yard split | 20-yard shuttle | Three-cone drill | Vertical jump | Broad jump | Bench press |
|---|---|---|---|---|---|---|---|---|---|---|---|---|
| 6 ft 2 1/2 in (1.89 m) | 224 lb (102 kg) | 31 3/4 in (0.81 m) | 9 3/4 in (0.25 m) | 6 ft 1 5/8 in (1.87 m) | 4.66 s | 1.68 s | 2.76 s | 4.44 s | 7.09 s | 32.0 in (0.81 m) | 10 ft 0 in (3.05 m) | 15 reps |
All values from Pro Day

Ahead of the 2026 NFL draft, King accepted an invite to the inaugural NFL-FCS Showcase, a joint collaboration between the NFL, the NCAA, and the American Football Coaches Association to provide an alternative to the NFL Scouting Combine for FCS players, held in Nashville, Tennessee, in January 2026. He then began a training program back on campus with three other Idaho teammates, meeting six days a week with their strength and conditioning coach to work on the various evaluation skills sought by NFL teams. On March 30, King participated in Idaho's pro day, stating: "We had good numbers, for sure, [...] Now it’s just waiting for a phone call."

=== Philadelphia Eagles ===
After going unselected in the 2026 NFL draft, it was announced that King had signed an undrafted free agent deal with the Philadelphia Eagles on April 25, 2026. He was instead invited to rookie minicamp on a tryout basis, after which he was signed by the Eagles, which the team announced on May 5. On June 10, he was waived.

=== Edmonton Elks ===
On July 2, 2026, King was signed to the practice roster of the Edmonton Elks of the Canadian Football League.

== Personal life ==
King majored in recreation, sports, and tourism management at the University of Idaho.
