= Chance Campbell =

American football player (born 1999)

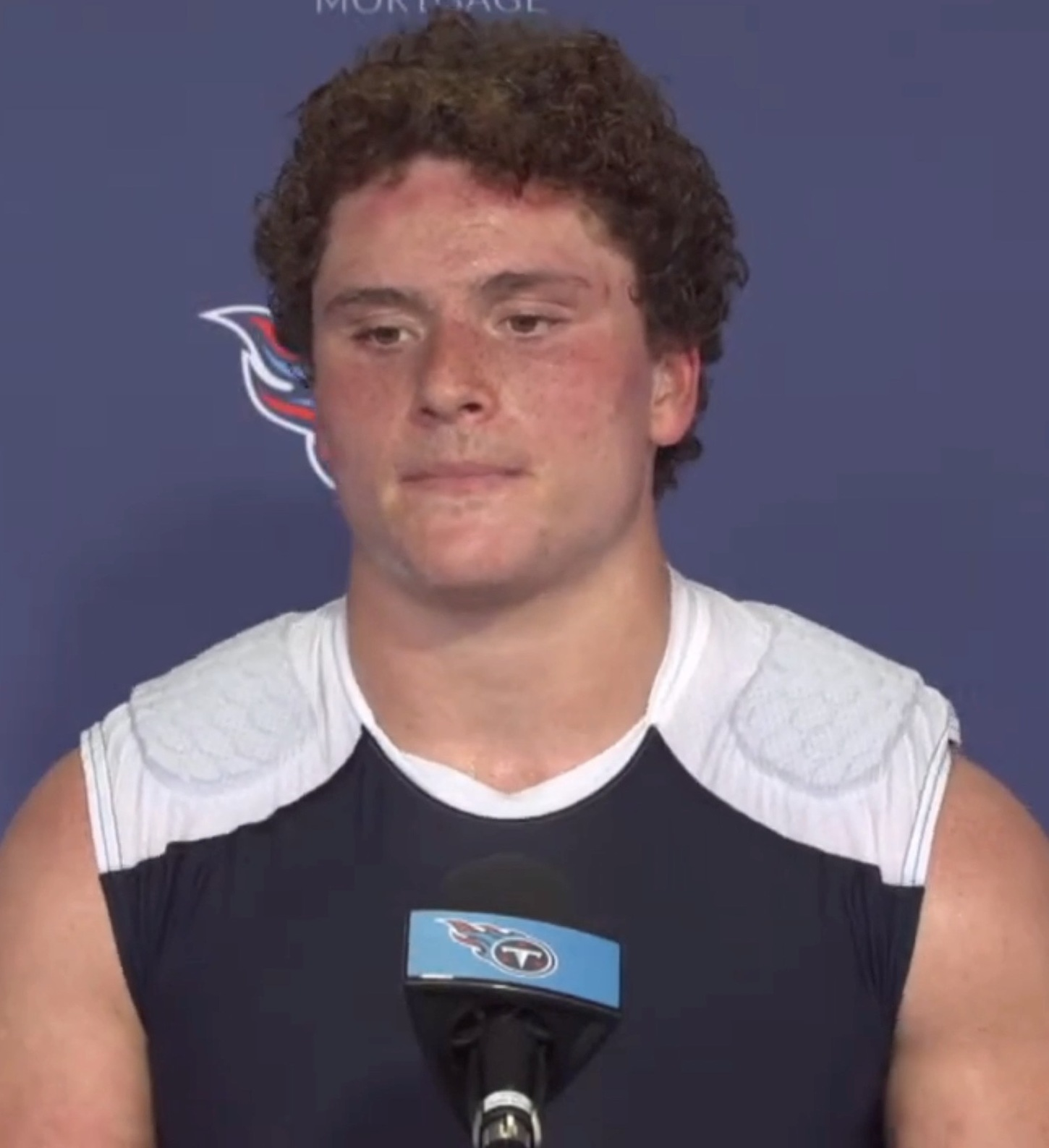
- Campbell in 2022

No. 59 – Philadelphia Eagles
- Position: Linebacker
- Roster status: Practice squad

Personal information
- Born: October 8, 1999 (age 27); Ellicott City, Maryland, U.S.
- Listed height: 6 ft 2 in (1.88 m)
- Listed weight: 232 lb (105 kg)

Career information
- High school: Calvert Hall (Towson, Maryland)
- College: Maryland (2018–2020); Ole Miss (2021)
- NFL draft: 2022: 6th round, 219th overall pick

Career history
- Tennessee Titans (2022–2024); Philadelphia Eagles (2025–present)*
- * Offseason or practice squad member only

Career NFL statistics as of 2024
- Total tackles: 3
- Stats at Pro Football Reference

Chance Dixon Campbell (born October 8, 1999) is an American professional football linebacker for the Philadelphia Eagles of the National Football League (NFL). He played college football for the Maryland Terrapins and Ole Miss Rebels.

== College career ==
Campbell began his college career at Maryland. He played mostly on special teams during his freshman season. Campbell played in 10 games with two starts as a sophomore and finished the season with 54 tackles, 4.5 tackles for loss, one forced fumble, and one interception. He led the Terrapins with 3 tackle and 5.5 tackles for loss in four games played in the team's COVID-19-shortened 2020 season. Following the end of the season, Campbell entered the NCAA transfer portal.

Campbell transferred to the University of Mississippi as a graduate transfer. He started all 13 of the Rebels' games and led the team with 110 tackles, 4 forced fumbles, and 3 fumbles recovered.

== Professional career ==
Pre-draft measurables
Height	Weight	Arm length	Hand span	Wingspan	40-yard dash	10-yard split	20-yard split	20-yard shuttle	Three-cone drill	Vertical jump	Broad jump
6 ft 2 3/8 in (1.89 m)	232 lb (105 kg)	31 1/4 in (0.79 m)	10 1/8 in (0.26 m)	6 ft 2 1/8 in (1.88 m)	4.57 s	1.54 s	2.63 s	4.25 s	7.19 s	39.5 in (1.00 m)	10 ft 7 in (3.23 m)
All values from NFL Combine/Pro Day

=== Tennessee Titans ===
Campbell was selected by the Tennessee Titans in the sixth round of the 2022 NFL draft with the 219th overall pick. He was placed on injured reserve on September 9, 2022, and did not play for the season.

On August 29, 2023, Campbell was waived as part of final roster cuts before the start of the 2023 season, but signed with the Titans' practice squad the following day. He was promoted to the active roster on September 22. He was waived on October 28 and re-signed to the practice squad three days later. He was promoted back to the active roster on November 11. He suffered an injury during warmups before Week 10 and was placed on injured reserve on November 15, ending his season. He played 4 games prior to his injury.

On August 26, 2024, head coach Brian Callahan announced that Campbell had suffered a torn ACL and would miss the entirety of the 2024 season.

=== Philadelphia Eagles ===
On August 20, 2025, Campbell signed with the Philadelphia Eagles. He was waived on August 26 as part of final roster cuts and re-signed to the practice squad the next day. Campbell signed a reserve/future contract with Philadelphia on January 12, 2026.

On August 30, 2026, Campbell was released by the Eagles as a part of final roster cuts. The following day, he was re–signed to Philadelphia's practice squad He was released on October 6. He was re-signed on November 16.
