= Maximus Pulley =

American football player (born 2002)

No. 36 – Los Angeles Rams
- Position: Safety
- Roster status: Active

Personal information
- Born: September 11, 2002 (age 24); Fort Worth, Texas, U.S.
- Listed height: 5 ft 11 in (1.80 m)
- Listed weight: 200 lb (91 kg)

Career information
- High school: L. D. Bell (Hurst, Texas)
- College: Western Kentucky (2021–2022); Wofford (2023–2025)
- NFL draft: 2026: undrafted

Career history
- Philadelphia Eagles (2026); Los Angeles Rams (2026–present)

Career NFL statistics as of Week 2, 2026
- Games played: 1
- Stats at Pro Football Reference

Maximus Pulley (born September 11, 2002) is an American professional football safety for the Los Angeles Rams of the National Football League (NFL). He played college football for the Western Kentucky Hilltoppers and Wofford Terriers. He has previously been a member of the Philadelphia Eagles.

== Early life and college career ==
Pulley was born on September 11, 2002, in Fort Worth, Texas. He attended L. D. Bell High School and competed in football and track and field. He had zero scholarship offers to play college football. During the 2021 college football season, Pulley joined the scout team for the Western Kentucky Hilltoppers after a tryout as a walk-on. He saw no playing time in his freshman year at Western Kentucky before recording one tackle while appearing in nine games in 2022.

Following his two seasons at Western Kentucky, Pulley transferred to the Wofford Terriers in 2023, where he won a starting role at safety. He recorded 51 tackles and three fumbles recovered in 2023, 53 tackles and 4.0 tackles-for-loss (TFLs) in 2024, and 85 tackles, a Southern Conference-leading five interceptions and two interception return touchdowns as a senior in 2025. In his last year, Pulley earned first-team All-Southern Conference and first-team FCS All-American honors while being a finalist for the Buck Buchanan Award as the best FCS defensive player. In his three years at Wofford, he posted 189 tackles, seven TFLs and seven interceptions.

== Professional career ==
Pre-draft measurables
Height	Weight	Arm length	Hand span	Wingspan	40-yard dash	10-yard split	20-yard split	20-yard shuttle	Three-cone drill	Vertical jump	Broad jump	Bench press
5 ft 10 7/8 in (1.80 m)	197 lb (89 kg)	29 1/2 in (0.75 m)	8 1/2 in (0.22 m)	6 ft 0 1/2 in (1.84 m)	4.52 s	1.52 s	2.59 s	4.25 s	7.27 s	38.5 in (0.98 m)	10 ft 3 in (3.12 m)	16 reps
All values from Pro Day

=== Philadelphia Eagles ===
After going unselected in the 2026 NFL draft, Pulley signed with the Philadelphia Eagles as an undrafted free agent. He had 20 tackles for the team in preseason. Pulley was waived by the Eagles as a part of final roster cuts on August 30, 2026; he was re-signed to the Eagles' practice squad the next day. He was elevated to the active roster for the team's Week 2 game against the Tennessee Titans and made his NFL debut in the 24–20 win.

=== Los Angeles Rams ===
On September 23, 2026, Pulley was signed by the Los Angeles Rams off of the Eagles' practice squad.
