= Don Smolenski =

American sports executive

Philadelphia Eagles
- Title: President

Personal information
- Born: Pittsford, New York, U.S.

Career information
- College: Amherst College and University of Hartford

Career history
- International Hockey League (1994–1998) Chief financial officer; Philadelphia Eagles (1998–present); Chief financial officer (1998–2000); Senior vice president/chief financial officer (2001–2009); Chief operating officer (2010–2011); President (2012–present)

Awards and highlights
- 2× Super Bowl champion (LII, LIX)

Don Smolenski is an American businessman who is the team president of the Philadelphia Eagles of the National Football League (NFL). He joined the franchise in 1998 as their chief financial officer before being promoted to his current role in 2012.

== Early life and education ==
Smolenski grew up in Pittsford, New York. He attended Amherst College and Hartford University.

== Career ==
In 1994, he was hired as the CFO of the International Hockey League.

=== Philadelphia Eagles ===
In 1998, he joined the Philadelphia Eagles of the National Football League (NFL). Smolenski served with the Eagles as their CFO from 1998 to 2009, then as their chief operating officer from 2010 to 2011 before being promoted to team president. He was part of the team that won the Super Bowl in 2017 and 2024.
