= 1987 Philadelphia Eagles season =

NFL team season

- Owner: Norman Braman
- Head coach: Buddy Ryan
- Offensive coordinator: Ted Plumb
- Defensive coordinator: Wade Phillips
- Home stadium: Veterans Stadium

Results
- Record: 7–8
- Division place: 4th NFC East
- Playoffs: Did not qualify

Uniform
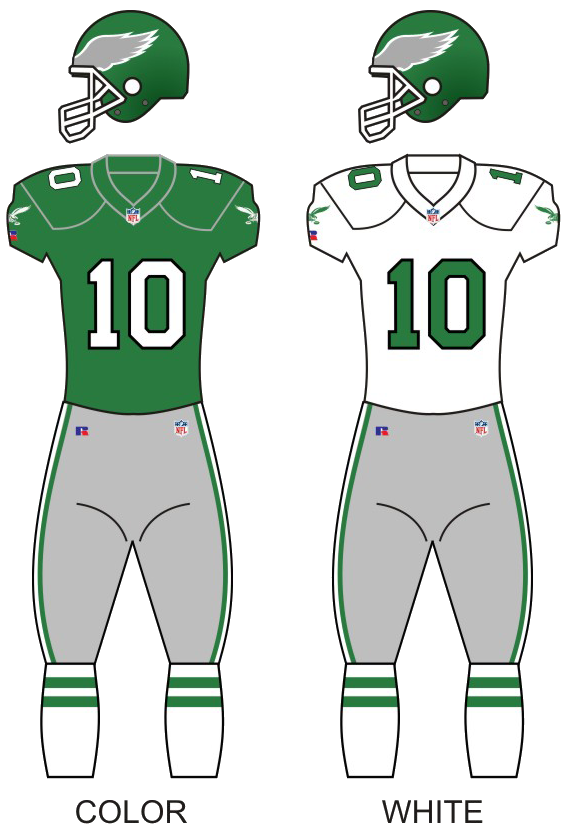

The 1987 Philadelphia Eagles season was their 55th in the National Football League (NFL). Despite the interruption of the schedule by the second strike in six seasons, the team improved upon its previous output of 5–10–1, going 7–8. However, three of those losses came during the three-game stretch during the strike when teams were staffed primarily with replacement players, or "scabs," who crossed the picket lines to suit up. Despite the improvement, the team once again failed to qualify for the playoffs.

Defensive lineman Reggie White nonetheless had a breakout season, establishing a new NFL record by exploding for 21 sacks in only 12 games.

On October 25 at Veterans Stadium, in the first game back after the strike was settled, Eagles head coach Buddy Ryan called for the infamous "fake kneel" in the final seconds with the hosts leading the Dallas Cowboys by 10 points. The fake eventually led to another late touchdown, payback for Cowboys head coach Tom Landry running up the score with starters who crossed the picket line to play two weeks earlier at Texas Stadium. One week later, Philadelphia won its final road game against the Cardinals at the old Busch Stadium, before the franchise moved to Phoenix for the 1988 season.

== Offseason ==
=== NFL draft ===
The 1987 NFL draft was the procedure by which National Football League teams selected amateur college football players. The draft was held April 28–29, 1987, in New York City. This again would be a 12-round draft of 28 teams. The Philadelphia Eagles would get the 9th in the 12 rounds. They would make 10 selections in the draft.

The table shows the Eagles selections and what picks they had that were traded away and the team that ended up with that pick. It is possible the Eagles' pick ended up with this team via another team that the Eagles made a trade with. Not shown are acquired picks that the Eagles traded away.

= Pro Bowler	= Hall of Famer

Round	Pick	Player	Position	School
1	9	Jerome Brown	Defensive tackle	Miami (FLA)
2	39	Traded Pick to	San Francisco 49ers	
3	65	Ben Tamburello	Center	Auburn
4	93	Byron Evans	Linebacker	Arizona
5	121	David Alexander	Center	Tulsa
6	149	Ron Moten	Linebacker	Florida
6	158	Chris Pike	Defensive Tackle	Tulsa
7	177	Brian Williams	Tackle	Central Michigan
8	204	Traded Pick to	San Diego Chargers	
9	232	Ken Lambiotte	Quarterback	William & Mary
10	260	Paul Carberry	Defensive Tackle	Oregon State
11	288	Traded Pick to	Los Angeles Raiders	
12	316	Bobby Morse	Running Back	Michigan State

=== NFL supplemental draft ===
The Eagles would also use a pick in the 1987 NFL supplemental draft to take Cris Carter a wide receiver out of Ohio State. Prior to Carter's senior season in 1987, he secretly signed with notorious sports agent Norby Walters. When the contract was discovered, Carter was ruled ineligible to play for Ohio State.

== Personnel ==
=== Staff / Coaches ===
1987 Philadelphia Eagles staff
Front office: Owner – Norman Braman; President and chief operating officer – Harry Gamble; Director of player personnel – Joe Woolley; Head coaches: Head coach – Buddy Ryan; Offensive coaches: Assistant head coach/offense – Ted Plumb; Quarterbacks – Doug Scovil; Offensive backs – Dave Atkins; Offensive line – Bill Walsh; Assistant offensive line – Dan Neal	Defensive coaches: Defensive coordinator/linebackers – Wade Phillips; Defensive line – Dale Haupt; Defensive backs – Jeff Fisher; Special teams coaches: Special teams – Dan Neal; Strength and conditioning: Strength and conditioning – Ronnie Jones

=== NFL replacement players ===
After the league decided to use replacement players during the NFLPA strike, the following team was assembled:

1987 Philadelphia Eagles replacement roster
Quarterbacks: 13 Pat Brennan; 14 Marty Horn; 19 Guido Merkens; 11 Scott Tinsley; Running backs: 22 Jacque Robinson; 23 Willie Turral; 24 Reggie Brown; 27 Topper Clemons; 41 Alvin Ross; 47 Joel Sense; Wide receivers: 81 Otis Grant; 82 Kenny Hansmire; 83 Kevin Bowman; 85 Jesse Bendross; 86 Mike Siano; Tight ends: 84 Ron Fazio; 87 Eric Bailey; 89 Jay Repko	Offensive linemen: 69 Jim Angelo; 75 Scott Leggett; 61 Matt Long; 78 Mike Nease; 64 Mike Perrino; 68 Pete Walters; 72 Jeff Wenzel; Defensive linemen: 97 Jim Auer; 96 Marvin Ayers; 80 Rick Bodmar; 65 Gary Bolden; 90 Randall Mitchell; 74 Tim Mooney; 93 Ray Phillips	Linebackers: 52 Matt Battaglia; 59 Carlos Bradley; 56 Dave Brosn; 51 Chuck Gorecki; -- Kelly Kirchbaum; 58 Byron Lee; 53 Fred Smalls; Defensive backs: 39 Vic Bellamy; 48 Thomas Caterbone; 45 Chris Gerhard; 28 Greg Harding; 43 Carter Hartwig; 42 Angelo James; 35 Mike Kullman; 32 Mike Ulmer; 31 Troy West; Special teams: 4 Dave Jacobs K; 5 Mark Royals P; 3 Jim Villani P

=== Roster ===
1987 Philadelphia Eagles roster
Quarterbacks (QB): 6 Matt Cavanaugh; 12 Randall Cunningham; Running backs (RB): 41 Keith Byars; 26 Michael Haddix; 36 Bobby Morse; 24 Alan Reid; 37 Junior Tautalatasi; 25 Anthony Toney; Wide receivers (WR): 80 Cris Carter; 86 Gregg Garrity; 81 Kenny Jackson; 85 Ron Johnson; 82 Mike Quick; Tight ends (TE): 83 Jimmie Giles; 89 David Little; 88 John Spagnola	Offensive linemen (OL): 79 Joe Conwell T; 78 Matt Darwin T; 67 Gerry Feehery C; 64 Mike Kelley C/G; 65 Bob Landsee G; 66 Ken Reeves G/T; 76 Adam Schreiber G; 68 Reggie Singletary G/T; 61 Ben Tamburello G; Defensive linemen (DL): 99 Jerome Brown DT; 71 Ken Clarke DT; 90 Mike Golic DT; 97 John Klingel DE; 74 Mike Pitts DT; 96 Clyde Simmons DE; 92 Reggie White DE	Linebackers (LB): 58 Ty Allert OLB; 50 Garry Cobb OLB; 56 Byron Evans MLB; 53 Dwayne Jiles OLB; 59 Seth Joyner OLB; 55 Mike Reichenbach MLB; 95 Jody Schulz OLB; Defensive backs (DB): 23 Cedrick Brown CB; 21 Evan Cooper FS; 33 William Frizzell CB; 29 Elbert Foules CB; 38 Russell Gary SS; 34 Terry Hoage FS; 20 Andre Waters SS; 43 Roynell Young CB; Special teams (ST): 72 David Alexander LS; 8 Paul McFadden K; 10 John Teltschik P	Reserve: 63 Ron Baker G (IR); 45 Charles Crawford RB (IR); 93 Jon Dumbauld DE (IR); 48 Wes Hopkins S (IR); 54 Alonzo Johnson LB (NF-Inj.); 9 Kenny Lambiotte QB (IR); 57 Ron Moten LB (IR); Rookies in italics

== Regular season ==
In 1987, Mike Quick was part of NFL history. He finished second in the NFL in touchdown receptions with 11. The leader was Jerry Rice with 23. This marked the first time in NFL history that a category leader doubled the total of his nearest competitor.

=== Schedule ===
Week	Date	Opponent	Result	Record	Attendance
1	September 13, 1987	at **Washington Redskins**	**L** 34–24	0–1	52,188
2	September 20, 1987	New Orleans Saints	**W** 27–17	1–1	57,485
–	September 27, 1987	at San Francisco 49ers	canceled		
3	October 4, 1987	Chicago Bears	**L** 35–3	1–2	4,074
4	October 11, 1987	at **Dallas Cowboys**	**L** 41–22	1–3	40,622
5	October 18, 1987	at Green Bay Packers	**L** 16–10	1–4	35,842
6	October 25, 1987	**Dallas Cowboys**	**W** 37–20	2–4	61,630
7	November 1, 1987	at **St. Louis Cardinals**	**W** 28–23	3–4	24,586
8	November 8, 1987	**Washington Redskins**	**W** 31–27	4–4	63,609
9	November 15, 1987	**New York Giants**	**L** 20–17	4–5	66,172
10	November 22, 1987	**St. Louis Cardinals**	**L** 31–19	4–6	55,592
11	November 29, 1987	at New England Patriots	**W** 34–31	5–6	54,198
12	December 6, 1987	at **New York Giants**	**L** 23–20	5–7	65,874
13	December 13, 1987	Miami Dolphins	**L** 28–10	5–8	63,841
14	December 20, 1987	at New York Jets	**W** 38–27	6–8	30,572
15	December 27, 1987	Buffalo Bills	**W** 17–7	7–8	57,547

Note: Intra-division opponents are in bold text.

== Games summaries ==
=== Week 1 ===
Sunday, September 13, 1987 Kickoff 1:00 pm Eastern

Played at Robert F. Kennedy Memorial Stadium on grass playing surface in 74F degrees with wind at 11 MPH.

	1	2	3	4	Final
Philadelphia Eagles (0–1)	0	10	14	0	24
Washington Redskins (1–0)	10	7	7	10	34

		SCORING PLAYS	PHIL	WASH	TIME
1st	Redskins	Jess Atkinson 27-yard field goal	0	3	
	Redskins	Art Monk 6-yard pass from Doug Williams (Jess Atkinson kick)	0	10	
2nd	Eagles	Mike Quick 30-yard pass from Randall Cunningham (Paul McFadden kick)	7	10	
	Eagles	Paul McFadden 33-yard field goal	10	10	
	Redskins	George Rogers 1-yard rush (Steve Cox kick)	10	17	
3rd	Redskins	Reggie Branch 1-yard rush (Steve Cox kick)	10	24	
	Eagles	Randall Cunningham 2-yard rush (Paul McFadden kick)	17	24	
	Eagles	Reggie White 70-yard fumble return (Paul McFadden kick)	24	24	
4th	Redskins	Art Monk 39-yard pass from Doug Williams (Steve Cox kick)	24	31	
	Redskins	Steve Cox 40-yard field goal	24	34	

=== Week 2 ===
Sunday, September 20, 1987 Kickoff 1:00 pm Eastern

Played at Veterans Stadium on an Astroturf playing surface in 62F degrees with wind at 12 MPH.

	1	2	3	4	Final
New Orleans Saints (1–1)	10	0	0	7	17
Philadelphia Eagles 1–1	0	17	3	7	27

		SCORING PLAYS	N OR	PHIL	TIME
1st	Saints	Morten Andersen 45-yard field goal	3	0	
	Saints	John Tice 6-yard pass from Bobby Hebert (Morten Andersen kick)	10	0	
2nd	Eagles	Paul McFadden 30-yard field goal	10	3	
	Eagles	Mike Quick 19-yard pass from Randall Cunningham (Paul McFadden kick)	10	10	
	Eagles	Kenny Jackson 25-yard pass from Randall Cunningham (Paul McFadden kick)	10	17	
3rd	Eagles	Paul McFadden 30-yard field goal	10	20	
	Eagles	Seth Joyner 18-yard fumble return (Paul McFadden kick)	10	27	
	Saints	John Tice 27-yard pass from Dave Wilson (Morten Andersen kick)	17	27	

=== Week Canceled ===
Because of the NFLPA union's players strike against the NFL, all the games this week were cancelled. Replacement players were used when the season resumed the following week.

The Eagles would have traveled to Candlestick Park to face the host 49ers in what would have been Buddy Ryan's only trip to the Bay Area as the Eagles' head coach. The Eagles sought their second win in San Francisco since 1983 (and also since the AFL-NFL merger). Ryan's Eagles did meet the 49ers once, losing at Veterans Stadium in 1989. The Eagles did not travel to San Francisco until 1992, nor did they win in San Francisco until the final night of the 1993 season.

=== Week 3 ===
Sunday, October 4, 1987 Kickoff 1:00 PM Eastern

Played at Veterans Stadium on an Astroturf playing surface; 48 degrees with wind at 19 MPH. This was the first game of the season with replacement players. The announced attendance was 4,074, the smallest crowd at an NFL contest in almost 40 years (since October 30, 1949, when 3,678 people attended a Washington Redskins-New York Bulldogs game at the Polo Grounds).

	1	2	3	4	Final
Chicago Bears (3–0)	7	28	0	0	35
Philadelphia Eagles (1–2)	0	3	0	0	3

		SCORING PLAYS	CHI	PHIL	TIME
1st	Bears	Lakei Heimuli 9-yard pass from Mike Hohensee (Tim Lashar kick)	7	0	
2nd	Eagles	Dave Jacobs 27-yard field goal	7	3	
	Bears	Glen Kozlowski 20-yard pass from Mike Hohensee (Tim Lashar kick)	14	3	
	Bears	Chris Brewer 1-yard rush (Tim Lashar kick)	21	3	
	Bears	Anthony Mosley 9-yard blocked punt return (Tim Lashar kick)	28	3	
	Bears	Don Kindt 3-yard pass from Mike Hohensee (Tim Lashar kick)	35	3	

=== Week 4 ===
Sunday, October 11, 1987 Kickoff 12:00 pm Central

Played at Texas Stadium on a grass playing surface in 58F degrees with wind at 16 MPH. Played with replacement players.

	1	2	3	4	Final
Philadelphia Eagles (1–3)	3	7	6	6	22
Dallas Cowboys (3–1)	21	6	14	0	41

		SCORING PLAYS	PHIL	DAL	TIME
1st	Cowboys	Kelvin Edwards 62-yard rush (Luis Zendejas kick)	0	7	
	Cowboys	Alvin Blount 8-yard rush (Luis Zendejas kick)	0	14	
	Cowboys	Cornell Burbage 77-yard pass from Kevin Sweeney (Luis Zendejas kick)	0	21	
	Eagles	Dave Jacobs 40-yard field goal	3	21	
2nd	Eagles	Kevin Bowman 62-yard pass from Scott Tinsley (Dave Jacobs kick)	10	21	
	Cowboys	Luis Zendejas 44-yard field goal	10	24	
	Cowboys	Luis Zendejas 50-yard field goal	10	27	
3rd	Cowboys	Tony Dorsett 10-yard rush (Luis Zendejas kick)	10	34	
	Cowboys	Alvin Blount 1-yard rush (Luis Zendejas kick)	10	41	
	Eagles	Mike Siano 13-yard pass from Scott Tinsley (kick failed)	16	41	
4th	Eagles	Clemons 13-yard pass from Scott Tinsley (kick failed)	22	41	

=== Week 5 ===
Sunday, October 18, 1987 Kickoff 12:00 pm Central

Played at Lambeau Field on a grass playing surface in 46F degrees with wind at 11 MPH. Played with replacement players.

	1	2	3	4	OT	Final
Philadelphia Eagles (1–4)	7	0	0	3	0	10
Green Bay Packers (2–2)	0	3	7	0	6	16

		SCORING PLAYS	PHIL	GB	TIME
1st	Eagles	Alvin Ross 5-yard rush (Dave Jacobs kick)	7	0	
2nd	Packers	Max Zendejas 42-yard field goal	7	3	
3rd	Packers	Lee Morris 46-yard pass from Alan Risher (Max Zendejas kick)	7	10	
4th	Eagles	Dave Jacobs 44-yard field goal	10	10	
OT	Packers	Jimmy Hargrove 5-yard rush	10	16	

=== Week 6 ===
Sunday October 25, 1987 Kickoff 1:00 pm Eastern

Played at Veterans Stadium on an Astroturf playing surface in 56F degrees with wind at 15 MPH. This was the first week the Eagles played after the NFLPA strike ended.

This was the revenge game for Week 4, where the Cowboys ran up the score against an Eagles replacement squad. Despite the game being effectively over, with the Eagles leading and having possession of the ball, the Eagles performed a fake kneel into a pass. Pass interference was called, and the Eagles successfully scored from the 1-yard line on the next play as time expired.

	1	2	3	4	Final
Dallas Cowboys (3–3)	3	7	3	7	20
Philadelphia Eagles (2–4)	3	10	7	17	37

		SCORING PLAYS	DAL	PHIL	TIME
1st	Cowboys	Roger Ruzek 23-yard field goal	3	0	
	Eagles	Paul McFadden 46-yard field goal	3	3	
2nd	Eagles	Paul McFadden 45-yard field goal	3	6	
	Eagles	John Spagnola 10-yard pass from Randall Cunningham (Paul McFadden kick)	3	13	
	Cowboys	Herschel Walker 1-yard rush (Roger Ruzek kick)	10	13	
3rd	Cowboys	Roger Ruzek 25-yard field goal	13	13	
	Eagles	Anthony Toney 1-yard rush (Paul McFadden kick)	13	20	
4th	Eagles	Paul McFadden 21-yard field goal	13	23	
	Eagles	John Spagnola 5-yard pass from Randall Cunningham (Paul McFadden kick)	13	30	
	Cowboys	Tony Dorsett 19-yard pass from Danny White (Roger Ruzek kick)	20	30	
	Eagles	Keith Byars 1-yard rush (Paul McFadden kick)	20	37	

=== Week 7 ===
Sunday, November 1, 1987 Kickoff 12:00 pm Central

Played at Busch Stadium on an AstroTurf playing surface in 68F degrees with wind at 10 MPH.

	1	2	3	4	Final
Philadelphia Eagles (3–4)	0	7	14	7	28
St. Louis Cardinals (2–5)	6	0	7	10	23

		SCORING PLAYS	PHIL	ST L	TIME
1st	Cardinals	Earl Ferrell 8-yard rush (kick failed)	0	6	
2nd	Eagles	Cris Carter 22-yard pass from Randall Cunningham (Paul McFadden kick)	7	6	
3rd	Eagles	Keith Byars 2-yard rush (Paul McFadden kick)	14	6	
	Eagles	Kenny Jackson 70-yard pass from Randall Cunningham (Paul McFadden kick)	21	6	
	Cardinals	J.T. Smith 14-yard pass from Neil Lomax (Jim Gallery kick)	21	13	
4th	Cardinals	Jim Gallery 43-yard field goal	21	16	
	Cardinals	Robert Awalt 8-yard pass from Neil Lomax (Jim Gallery kick)	21	23	
	Eagles	Gregg Garrity 9-yard pass from Randall Cunningham (Paul McFadden kick)	28	23	

=== Week 8 ===
Sunday, November 8, 1987 Kickoff 1:00 pm Eastern

Played at Veterans Stadium on an Astroturf playing surface in 52F degrees with wind at 10 MPH.

	1	2	3	4	Final
Washington Redskins (6–2)	7	14	0	6	27
Philadelphia Eagles (4–4)	7	10	0	14	31

		SCORING PLAYS	WASH	PHIL	TIME
1st	Eagles	Anthony Toney 5-yard rush (Paul McFadden kick)	0	7	
	Redskins	George Rogers 3-yard rush (Ali Haji-Sheikh kick)	7	7	
2nd	Redskins	Art Monk 19-yard pass from Jay Schroeder (Ali Haji-Sheikh kick)	14	7	
	Redskins	Darrell Green 26-yard fumble return (Ali Haji-Sheikh kick)	21	7	
	Eagles	Paul McFadden 37-yard field goal	21	10	
	Eagles	Mike Quick 6-yard pass from Randall Cunningham (Paul McFadden kick)	21	17	
4th	Eagles	Mike Quick 32-yard pass from Randall Cunningham (Paul McFadden kick)	21	24	
	Redskins	Gary Clark 47-yard pass from Jay Schroeder (kick failed)	27	24	
	Eagles	Gregg Garrity 40-yard pass from Randall Cunningham (Paul McFadden kick)	27	31	

=== Week 9 ===
Sunday, November 15, 1987 Kickoff 4:00 pm Eastern

Played at Veterans Stadium on an Astroturf playing surface in 50F degrees with wind at 8 MPH.

	1	2	3	4	Final
New York Giants (3–6)	7	3	7	3	20
Philadelphia Eagles (4–5)	10	0	7	0	17

		SCORING PLAYS	NY G	PHIL	TIME
1st	Eagles	Randall Cunningham 4-yard rush (Paul McFadden kick)	0	7	
	Eagles	Paul McFadden 25-yard field goal	0	10	
	giants	Lionel Manuel 36-yard pass from Jeff Rutledge (Raul Allegre kick)	7	10	
2nd	Giants	Raul Allegre 53-yard field goal	10	10	
3rd	Eagles	Keith Byars 8-yard pass from Randall Cunningham (Paul McFadden kick)	10	17	
	Giants	George Adams 1-yard rush (Raul Allegre kick)	17	17	
4th	Giants	Raul Allegre 52-yard field goal	20	17	

=== Week 10 ===
Sunday, November 22, 1987 Kickoff 1:00 pm Eastern

Played at Veterans Stadium on an Astroturf playing surface in 26 °F (−3 °C) with wind at 19 MPH with a wind chill of 12 °F (−11 °C).

	1	2	3	4	Final
St. Louis Cardinals (4–6)	7	24	0	0	31
Philadelphia Eagles (4–6)	3	0	7	9	19

		SCORING PLAYS	ST L	PHIL	TIME
1st	Eagles	Paul McFadden 44-yard field goal	0	3	
	Cardinals	Roy Green 20-yard pass from Neil Lomax (Jim Gallery kick)	7	3	
2nd	Cardinals	J.T. Smith 6-yard pass from Neil Lomax (Jim Gallery kick)	14	3	
	Cardinals	Jim Gallery 20-yard field goal	17	3	
	Cardinals	Smith 32-yard pass from Neil Lomax (Jim Gallery kick)	24	3	
	Cardinals	Earl Ferrell 35-yard rush (Jim Gallery kick)	31	3	
3rd	Eagles	Mike Quick 16-yard pass from Randall Cunningham (Paul McFadden kick)	31	10	
4th	Eagles	Mike Quick 27-yard pass from Randall Cunningham (Paul McFadden kick)	31	17	
	Eagles	Safety, Cater stepped out of end zone	31	19	

=== Week 11 ===
November 29, 1987 Kickoff 1:00 pm Eastern

Played at Sullivan Stadium on an AstroTurf playing surface in 38F degrees with wind at 11 MPH.

	1	2	3	4	OT	Final
Philadelphia Eagles (5–6)	3	14	7	7	3	34
New England Patriots (5–6)	0	10	0	21	0	31

		SCORING PLAYS	PHIL	NE	TIME
1st	Eagles	Paul McFadden 19-yard field goal	3	0	
2nd	Patriots	Tony Collins 24-yard pass from Tom Ramsey (Tony Franklin kick)	3	7	
	Eagles	Mike Quick 61-yard pass from Randall Cunningham (Paul McFadden kick)	10	7	
	Eagles	Randall Cunningham 1-yard rush (Paul McFadden kick)	17	7	
	Patriots	Tony Franklin 21-yard field goal	17	10	
3rd	Eagles	Anthony Toney 1-yard rush (Paul McFadden kick)	24	10	
4th	Eagles	Mike Quick 29-yard pass from Randall Cunningham (Paul McFadden kick)	31	10	
	Patriots	Stanley Morgan 13-yard pass from Tom Ramsey (Tony Franklin kick)	31	17	
	Patriots	Willie Scott 3-yard pass from Tom Ramsey (Tony Franklin kick)	31	24	
	Patriots	Tom Ramsey 1-yard rush (Tony Franklin kick)	31	31	
OT	Eagles	Paul McFadden 38-yard field goal	34	31	

=== Week 12 ===
December 6, 1987 Stadium Kickoff 1:00 pm Eastern

Played at The Meadowlands on an AstroTurf playing surface in 38F degrees with wind at 22 MPH and a wind chill of 27F.

	1	2	3	4	OT	Final
Philadelphia Eagles (5–7)	0	6	0	14	0	20
New York Giants (4–8)	7	0	6	7	3	23

		SCORING PLAYS	PHIL	NY G	TIME
1st	Giants	Mark Bavaro 19-yard pass from Phil Simms (Raul Allegre kick)	0	7	
2nd	Eagles	Paul McFadden 41-yard field goal	3	7	
	Eagles	Paul McFadden 49-yard field goal	6	7	
3rd	Giants	Raul Allegre 20-yard field goal	6	10	
	Giants	Raul Allegre 46-yard field goal	6	13	
4th	Giants	Stephen Baker 16-yard pass from Phil Simms (Raul Allegre kick)	6	20	
	Eagles	Kenny Jackson 36-yard pass from Randall Cunningham (Paul McFadden kick)	13	20	
	Eagles	Jimmie Giles 40-yard pass from Randall Cunningham (Paul McFadden kick)	20	20	
OT	Giants	Raul Allegre 28-yard field goal	20	23	

=== Week 13 ===
Sunday, December 13, 1987 Kickoff 1:00 pm Eastern

Played at Veterans Stadium on an Astroturf playing surface in 43F degrees with wind at 15 MPH.

	1	2	3	4	Final
Miami Dolphins (7–6)	0	14	14	0	28
Philadelphia Eagles (5–8)	0	10	0	0	10

		SCORING PLAYS	MIA	PHIL	TIME
2nd	Eagles	Mike Quick 44-yard pass from Randall Cunningham (Paul McFadden kick)	0	7	
	Dolphins	Mark Duper 20-yard pass from Dan Marino (Van Tiffin kick)	7	7	
	Eagles	Paul McFadden 27-yard field goal	7	10	
	Dolphins	Ron Davenport 1-yard rush (Van Tiffin kick)	14	10	
	Dolphins	Mark Clayton 11-yard pass from Dan Marino (Van Tiffin kick)	21	10	
	Dolphins	Mark Clayton 20-yard pass from Dan Marino (Van Tiffin kick)	28	10	

=== Week 14 ===
Sunday, December 20, 1987 Kickoff 1:00 pm Eastern

Played at The Meadowlands on an Astroturf playing surface in 42F degrees with wind at 11 MPH.

	1	2	3	4	Final
Philadelphia Eagles (6–8)	10	14	14	0	38
New York Jets (6–8)	3	17	0	7	27

		SCORING PLAYS	PHIL	NY J	TIME
1st	Eagles	Anthony Toney 3-yard rush (Paul McFadden kick)	7	0	
	Eagles	Paul McFadden 38-yard field goal	10	0	
	Jets	Pat Leahy 42-yard field goal	10	3	
2nd	Jets	Kurt Sohn 9-yard pass from Ken O'Brien (Pat Leahy kick)	10	10	
	Jets	Roger Vick 5-yard rush (Pat Leahy kick)	10	17	
	Eagles	Mike Quick 45-yard pass from Randall Cunningham (Paul McFadden kick)	17	17	
	Eagles	Mike Quick 13-yard pass from Randall Cunningham (Paul McFadden kick)	24	17	
	Jets	Pat Leahy 29-yard field goal	24	20	
3rd	Eagles	Keith Byars 2-yard rush (Paul McFadden kick)	31	20	
	Eagles	Cris Carter 14-yard pass from Randall Cunningham (Paul McFadden kick)	38	20	
4th	Jets	Al Toon 51-yard pass from Ken O'Brien (Pat Leahy kick)	38	27	

=== Week 15 ===
Sunday, December 27, 1987 Kickoff 1:00 pm Eastern

Played at Veterans Stadium on an Astroturf playing surface in 35F degrees with wind at 10 MPH with a wind chill of 28.

	1	2	3	4	Final
Buffalo Bills (7–8)	0	0	0	7	7
Philadelphia Eagles (7–8–0)	0	10	7	0	17

		SCORING PLAYS	BUFF	PHIL	TIME
2nd	Eagles	Paul McFadden 39-yard field goal	0	3	
	Eagles	Anthony Toney 18-yard pass from Randall Cunningham (Paul McFadden kick)	0	10	
3rd	Eagles	Anthony Toney 2-yard rush (Paul McFadden kick)	0	17	
4th	Bills	Andre Reed 4-yard pass from Jim Kelly (Scott Norwood kick)	7	17	

== Standings ==
NFC East
	W	L	T	PCT	DIV	CONF	PF	PA	STK
Washington Redskins^{(3)}	11	4	0	.733	7–1	9–3	379	285	W1
Dallas Cowboys	7	8	0	.467	4–4	5–7	340	348	W2
St. Louis Cardinals	7	8	0	.467	3–5	7–7	362	368	L1
Philadelphia Eagles	7	8	0	.467	3–5	4–7	337	380	W2
New York Giants	6	9	0	.400	3–5	4–8	280	312	W2

== Awards and honors ==
- Mike Quick, 1987 Pro Bowl selection
