= 1986 Philadelphia Eagles season =

NFL team season

- Owner: Norman Braman
- Head coach: Buddy Ryan
- Home stadium: Veterans Stadium

Results
- Record: 5–10–1
- Division place: 4th NFC East
- Playoffs: Did not qualify
- Pro Bowlers: WR Mike Quick; DT Reggie White

Uniform
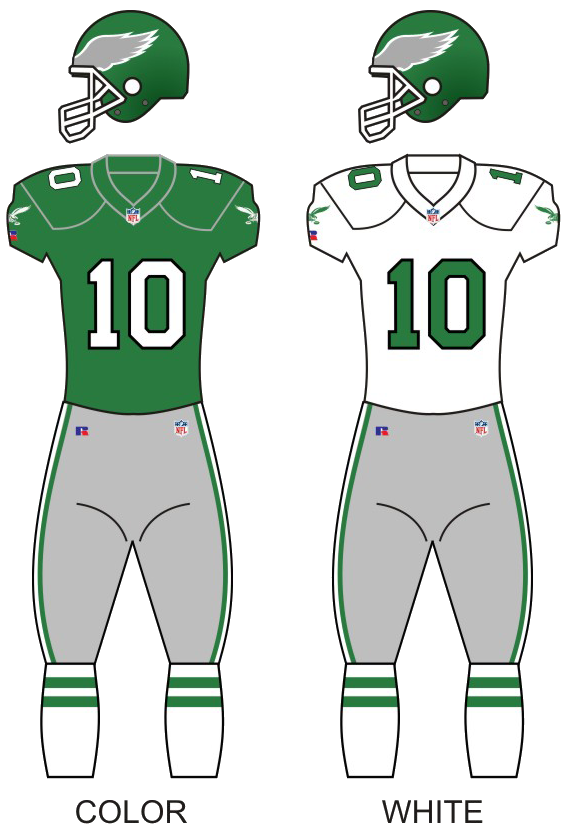

The Philadelphia Eagles played their 54th season in the National Football League (NFL) in 1986. The team was unable to improve upon their previous output win total of seven. Instead, the team finished with five wins, ten losses and one tie. This was the fifth consecutive season in which the team failed to qualify for the playoffs.

The season was head coach Buddy Ryan's first with the team after serving as the defensive coordinator of the Chicago Bears, who had won the Super Bowl the previous season.

Quarterback duties were split between 35-year-old veteran Ron Jaworski, who started nine games in his final season with the team, and second-year quarterback Randall Cunningham. Veteran quarterback Matt Cavanaugh also started two games. This rotation of quarterback duty resulted in a unique moment in which center Bob Landsee had the distinction of snapping the ball to all three different quarterbacks on the same series. Overall, the Eagles' passing game finished with the third-fewest passing yards in the league (2,540), and the fewest yards-per-attempt (4.1).

The Eagles set dubious NFL records with one of the worst offensive lines in league history. They gave up a record number of sacks (a still-standing NFL-record of 104) and yardage allowed on sacks (708). No other team in football history has ever given up more than 85 sacks or 554 yards on quarterback sacks. The team gave up three-or-more sacks in every single game of the 1986 season, the only team in NFL history to do so.

The lone highlights of the season came on the road. On October 5, the Eagles entered Fulton County Stadium and shut out the Atlanta Falcons, 16–0. Then gained a comeback, 33–27 overtime win against the Los Angeles Raiders at Los Angeles Memorial Coliseum on November 30, the Eagles’ first win over the club since the 1980 season and first-ever victory on the road against the Raiders.

== NFL draft ==
The table shows the Eagles selections and what picks they had that were traded away and the team that ended up with that pick. It is possible the Eagles' pick ended up with this team via another team that the Eagles made a trade with. Not shown are acquired picks that the Eagles traded away.

= Pro Bowler	= Hall of Famer

Round	Pick	Player	Position	School
1	10	Keith Byars	Running back	Ohio State
2	37	Anthony Toney	Running back	Texas A&M
2	48	Alonzo Johnson	Linebacker	Florida
4	106	Matt Darwin	Center	Texas A&M
5	121	Ray Criswell	Punter	Florida
5	128	Dan McMillen	Defensive end	Colorado
6	149	Bob Landsee	Center	Wisconsin
7	169	Cornelius Redick	Wide receiver	Fullerton State
7	176	Byron Lee	Linebacker	Ohio State
7	*	Charles Crawford	Running back	Oklahoma State
8	208	Seth Joyner	Linebacker	Texas-El Paso
9	233	Clyde Simmons	Defensive end	Western Carolina
10	261	Junior Tautalatasi	Running back	Washington State
11	288	Steve Bogdalek	Guard	Michigan State
12	315	Reggie Singletary	Defensive end	North Carolina State
12	325	Bobby Howard	Running back	Indiana

- Supplemental pick

== Personnel ==
=== Staff / Coaches ===
1986 Philadelphia Eagles staff
Front office: Owner – Norman Braman; President and Chief Operating Officer – Harry Gamble; Director of player personnel – Joe Woolley; Head coaches: Head coach – Buddy Ryan; Offensive coaches: Assistant head coach/offense – Ted Plumb; Quarterbacks – Doug Scovil; Offensive Backs – Dave Atkins; Offensive Line – Ken Iman	Defensive coaches: Defensive coordinator/Linebackers – Wade Phillips; Defensive Line – Dale Haupt; Defensive Backs – Jeff Fisher; Special teams coaches: Special Teams – Dan Neal

=== Roster ===
1986 Philadelphia Eagles roster
Quarterbacks (QB): 6 Matt Cavanaugh; 12 Randall Cunningham; Running backs (RB): 42 Keith Byars; 45 Charles Crawford; 26 Michael Haddix; 37 Junior Tautalatasi; 25 Anthony Toney; Wide receivers (WR): 86 Gregg Garrity; 81 Kenny Jackson; 85 Ron Johnson; 82 Mike Quick; Tight ends (TE): 89 David Little; 88 John Spagnola	Offensive linemen (OL): 63 Ron Baker G; 77 Mike Black T; 79 Joe Conwell T; 78 Matt Darwin C; 65 Bob Landsee G/C; 66 Ken Reeves G/T; 76 Adam Schreiber C; Defensive linemen (DL): 98 Greg Brown DE; 71 Ken Clarke DT; 94 Byron Darby DE; 96 Clyde Simmons DE; 97 Reggie Singletary DT; 93 Thomas Strauthers DT; 69 Jeff Tupper DE; 92 Reggie White DE/DT	Linebackers (LB): 50 Garry Cobb OLB; 53 Dwayne Jiles OLB; 54 Alonzo Johnson OLB; 59 Seth Joyner OLB; 58 Byron Lee MLB; 55 Mike Reichenbach MLB; 95 Jody Schulz OLB; Defensive backs (DB): 21 Evan Cooper CB; 29 Elbert Foules CB; 33 William Frizzell CB; 34 Terry Hoage FS; 20 Andre Waters SS; 22 Brenard Wilson FS; 43 Roynell Young CB; Special teams (ST): 8 Paul McFadden K; 10 John Teltschik P	Reserve: 67 Gerry Feehery C (IR); 62 Nick Haden G (IR); 48 Wes Hopkins S (IR); 7 Ron Jaworski; 52 Rich Kraynak LB (IR); 74 Leonard Mitchell T (IR); 87 Cornelius Redick WR (IR); 83 Phil Smith WR (IR); Rookies in italics

== Schedule ==
Week	Date	Opponent	Result	Record	Attendance
1	September 7, 1986	at **Washington Redskins**	**L** 41–14	0–1	53,982
2	September 14, 1986	at Chicago Bears	**L** 13–10 (OT)	0–2	65,130
3	September 21, 1986	Denver Broncos	**L** 33–7	0–3	63,839
4	September 28, 1986	Los Angeles Rams	**W** 34–20	1–3	65,646
5	October 5, 1986	at Atlanta Falcons	**W** 16–0	2–3	57,104
6	October 12, 1986	at **New York Giants**	**L** 35–3	2–4	74,221
7	October 19, 1986	**Dallas Cowboys**	**L** 17–14	2–5	68,572
8	October 26, 1986	San Diego Chargers	**W** 23–7	3–5	41,469
9	November 2, 1986	at **St. Louis Cardinals**	**L** 13–10	3–6	33,051
10	November 9, 1986	**New York Giants**	**L** 17–14	3–7	60,601
11	November 16, 1986	Detroit Lions	**L** 13–11	3–8	54,568
12	November 23, 1986	at Seattle Seahawks	**L** 24–20	3–9	55,786
13	November 30, 1986	at Los Angeles Raiders	**W** 33–27 (OT)	4–9	53,338
14	December 7, 1986	**St. Louis Cardinals**	**T** 10–10 (OT)	4–9–1	50,148
15	December 14, 1986	at **Dallas Cowboys**	**W** 23–21	5–9–1	46,117
16	December 21, 1986	**Washington Redskins**	**L** 21–14	5–10–1	61,816

Note: Intra-division opponents are in bold text.

== Game summaries ==
=== Week 2 ===
Quarter	1	2	3	4	OT	Total
Eagles	3	0	0	7	0	10
Bears	0	0	10	0	3	13

at Soldier Field, Chicago, Illinois

- Date: September 14
- Game time: 12:00 p.m.
- Game weather: 61 °F (16.1 °C), wind 12 miles per hour (19 km/h; 10 kn)
- Game attendance: 65,130
- Referee: Dick Jorgensen
- TV announcers (CBS): Dick Stockton and Dan Dierdorf
- Box scores at Pro-Football-Reference.com

Game information

First quarter

- PHI – Paul McFadden 49 yard field goal – Eagles 3–0

Third quarter

- CHI – Walter Payton 1 yard run (Kevin Butler kick) – Bears 7–3
- CHI – Kevin Butler 23 yard field goal – Bears 10–3

Fourth quarter

- PHI – Mike Quick 26 yard pass from Ron Jaworski (Paul McFadden kick) – Tied 10–10

Overtime

- CHI – Kevin Butler 23 yard field goal – Bears 13–10

Eagles

- Ron Jaworski
  18/30, 165 Yds, TD, 2 INT
- Michael Haddix
  9 Rush, 34 Yds
- Mike Quick
  5 Rec, 67 Yds, TD

Bears

- Mike Tomczak
  10/20, 116 Yds, 2 INT
- Walter Payton
  34 Rush, 177 Yds, TD
- Willie Gault
  2 Rec, 31 Yds

==== Week 6: at New York Giants ====
Quarter	1	2	3	4	Total
Eagles	0	3	0	0	3
Giants	0	14	14	7	35

at Giants Stadium, East Rutherford, New Jersey

- Date: October 12
- Game time: 4:00 p.m. EDT
- Game weather: 55 °F (12.8 °C), wind 12 miles per hour (19 km/h; 10 kn)
- Game attendance: 74,221
- Referee: Jerry Markbreit
- TV announcers (CBS): Dick Stockton (play-by-play), Dan Dierdorf (color commentator)

==== Week 10: vs. New York Giants ====
Quarter	1	2	3	4	Total
Giants	0	10	7	0	17
Eagles	0	0	0	14	14

at Veterans Stadium, Philadelphia, Pennsylvania

- Date: November 9
- Game time: 4:00 p.m. EST
- Game weather: 64 °F (17.8 °C), wind 12 miles per hour (19 km/h; 10 kn)
- Game attendance: 60,601
- Referee: Fred Wyant
- TV announcers (CBS): Pat Summerall (play-by-play), John Madden (color commentary)

=== Week 13 ===
Team	1	2	3	4	OT	Total
• Eagles	13	0	7	7	6	33
Raiders	7	3	14	3	0	27

- Date: November 30
- Location: Los Angeles Memorial Coliseum, Los Angeles, California
- Game start: 1:00 p.m.
- Game weather: 61 °F (16.1 °C); wind 5 miles per hour (8.0 km/h; 4.3 kn)
- Referee: Chuck Heberling
- TV announcers (CBS): Gary Bender and Hank Stram

Scoring summary
1	LA	Fulton Walker 70 yard punt return (Chris Bahr kick)	LA 7–0
1	PHI	Mike Quick 62 yard pass from Randall Cunningham (Paul McFadden kick)	Tie 7–7
1	PHI	Gregg Garrity 76 yard punt return (kick failed)	PHI 13–7
2	LA	Chris Bahr 38 yard field goal	PHI 13–10
3	LA	Jessie Hester 49 yard pass from Jim Plunkett (Chris Bahr kick)	LA 17–13
3	PHI	Mike Quick 5 yard pass from Randall Cunningham (Paul McFadden kick)	PHI 20–17
3	LA	Jessie Hester 81 yard pass from Jim Plunkett (Chris Bahr kick)	LA 24–20
4	PHI	Mike Quick 10 yard pass from Randall Cunningham (Paul McFadden kick)	PHI 27–24
4	LA	Chris Bahr 27 yard field goal	Tie 27–27
OT	PHI	Randall Cunningham 1 yard run	PHI 33–27

- Mike Quick 8 Rec, 145 Yds, 3 TD

== Standings ==
NFC East
	W	L	T	PCT	DIV	CONF	PF	PA	STK
New York Giants^{(1)}	14	2	0	.875	7–1	11–1	371	236	W9
Washington Redskins^{(4)}	12	4	0	.750	5–3	9–3	368	296	W1
Dallas Cowboys	7	9	0	.438	5–3	6–6	346	337	L5
Philadelphia Eagles	5	10	1	.344	1–6–1	3–8–1	256	312	L1
St. Louis Cardinals	4	11	1	.281	1–6–1	3–10–1	218	351	W1

== Awards and honors ==
- Keith Byars, Franchise record, most rushing yards by a rookie
