= 1985 USFL territorial draft =

General information
- Date: January 3, 1985
- Location: Grand Hyatt Hotel, New York

Overview
- League: USFL

The 1985 USFL territorial draft was the third territorial draft of the United States Football League (USFL). It took place on January 3, 1985, at the Grand Hyatt Hotel in New York. Under the previous two territorial drafts, each team had five designated schools from which to make 25 selections. In this season it was raised to six schools per team, which was speculated in the media as a way to allow the New Jersey Generals to sign quarterback Doug Flutie.

== Player selections ==
= All-Star
= USFL MVP

USFL team	Player	Position	College
Arizona Outlaws	Doug Allen	WR	Arizona State
Arizona Outlaws	Steve Boadway	LB	Arizona
Arizona Outlaws	Lynnden Brown	DB	Arizona
Arizona Outlaws	Randall Cunningham	QB	Nevada-Las Vegas
Arizona Outlaws	Charlie Dickey	G	Arizona
Arizona Outlaws	Jay Dobyns	WR	Arizona
Arizona Outlaws	Joe Drake	DT	Arizona
Arizona Outlaws	Phil Freeman	RB	Arizona
Arizona Outlaws	Louis Garza	T	New Mexico State
Arizona Outlaws	Lamonte Hunley	LB	Arizona
Arizona Outlaws	Johnny Jackson	LB	New Mexico
Arizona Outlaws	Nick Johnson	LB	New Mexico
Arizona Outlaws	Vance Johnson	RB	Arizona
Arizona Outlaws	Kim Locklin	RB	New Mexico State
Arizona Outlaws	Tom Magazzeni	T	Arizona State
Arizona Outlaws	Mike Mendoza	QB	Northern Arizona
Arizona Outlaws	Jim Meyer	P	Arizona State
Arizona Outlaws	Aaron Moog	DE	Nevada-Las Vegas
Arizona Outlaws	Brian Noble	DE	Arizona State
Arizona Outlaws	Tom Polley	LB	Nevada-Las Vegas
Arizona Outlaws	Dalton Reed	DB	Nevada-Las Vegas
Arizona Outlaws	Greg Turner	DB	Arizona
Arizona Outlaws	Jimmy Williams	LB	Arizona State
Arizona Outlaws	David Wood	DT	Arizona
Arizona Outlaws	Luis Zendejas	K	Arizona State
Baltimore Stars	Caesar Aldisert	LB	Pittsburgh
Baltimore Stars	Troy Benson	LB	Pittsburgh
Baltimore Stars	Russell Carter	WR	Temple
Baltimore Stars	Greg Christy	OG	Pittsburgh
Baltimore Stars	Eddie Colson	FB	North Carolina
Baltimore Stars	Chris Doleman	LB	Pittsburgh
Baltimore Stars	Bill Fralic	T	Pittsburgh
Baltimore Stars	Nick Gancitano	K	Penn State
Baltimore Stars	Nick Haden	C	Penn State
Baltimore Stars	Ethan Horton	RB	North Carolina
Baltimore Stars	Marlon McIntyre	RB	Pittsburgh
Baltimore Stars	Don McMullin	TE	Temple
Baltimore Stars	Micah Moon	LB	North Carolina
Baltimore Stars	Tony Mumford	RB	Penn State
Baltimore Stars	Greg Naron	G	North Carolina
Baltimore Stars	Bobby Pope	T	North Carolina
Baltimore Stars	Dan Reeder	RB	Delaware
Baltimore Stars	Stan Short	T	Penn State
Baltimore Stars	Bruce Smith	DE	Virginia Tech
Baltimore Stars	Doug Strang	QB	Penn State
Baltimore Stars	Chris Sydnor	DB	Penn State
Baltimore Stars	Blair Talmadge	DB	Lehigh
Baltimore Stars	Bill Wallace	WR	Pittsburgh
Baltimore Stars	Rocky Washington	WR	Penn State
Baltimore Stars	Ali Witherspoon	LB	Delaware
Baltimore Stars	Anthony Young	DB	Temple
Birmingham Stallions	Clayton Beauford	WR	Auburn
Birmingham Stallions	Rob Bennett	TE	West Virginia
Birmingham Stallions	Gregg Carr	LB	Auburn
Birmingham Stallions	Paul Ott Carruth	RB	Alabama
Birmingham Stallions	Nat Ceasar	DB	Auburn
Birmingham Stallions	Carey Christensen	QB	Troy
Birmingham Stallions	Thomas Clark	DB	Troy
Birmingham Stallions	Rufus Cox	WR	Troy
Birmingham Stallions	Willie Drewrey	WR	West Virginia
Birmingham Stallions	Mitch Geier	G	Troy
Birmingham Stallions	Kevin Greene	DE	Auburn
Birmingham Stallions	David King	DB	Auburn
Birmingham Stallions	Emanuel King	LB	Alabama
Birmingham Stallions	Bill Legg	LB	West Virginia
Birmingham Stallions	Albert Marvin	DE	Alabama State
Birmingham Stallions	Tim Moffett	WR	Mississippi
Birmingham Stallions	Ricky Moore	RB	Alabama
Birmingham Stallions	Freddie Joe Nunn	DE	Mississippi
Birmingham Stallions	Ron O'Neal	RB	Auburn
Birmingham Stallions	Karl Powe	WR	Alabama State
Birmingham Stallions	Terry Sanders	P	Alabama
Birmingham Stallions	Ben Thomas	DT	Auburn
Birmingham Stallions	Greg Walker	T	Mississippi
Birmingham Stallions	Ron Wolfley	RB	West Virginia
Birmingham Stallions	Paul Woodside	K	West Virginia
Denver Gold	Mark Allen	DB	Brigham Young
Denver Gold	Marv Allen	LB	Brigham Young
Denver Gold	Dave Burke	DB	Nebraska
Denver Gold	Alan Chrite	LB	Colorado
Denver Gold	Bret Clark	DB	Nebraska
Denver Gold	Wayne Dawson	LB	Texas Tech
Denver Gold	Ken Graeber	DT	Nebraska
Denver Gold	Harry Grimminger	G	Nebraska
Denver Gold	Larry Hamilton	DT	Brigham Young
Denver Gold	Rodney Harding	DT	Oklahoma State
Denver Gold	Jamie Harris	WR	Oklahoma State
Denver Gold	Adam Haysbert	WR	Brigham Young
Denver Gold	Rusty Hilger	QB	Oklahoma State
Denver Gold	Dwayne Jiles	LB	Texas Tech
Denver Gold	Kelley Johnson	WR	Colorado
Denver Gold	Shawn Jones	RB	Oklahoma State
Denver Gold	Tom Morrow	T	Nebraska
Denver Gold	Ralph Partida	G	Oklahoma State
Denver Gold	Ray Polk	DB	Oklahoma State
Denver Gold	Brad Smith	DT	Brigham Young
Denver Gold	Scott Strasburger	LB	Nebraska
Denver Gold	Shane Swanson	WR	Nebraska
Denver Gold	Joe Walter	T	Texas Tech
Denver Gold	Brad White	DT	Texas Tech
Denver Gold	Louis Wong	G	Brigham Young
Houston Gamblers	Ron Anderson	LB	Southern Methodist
Houston Gamblers	Andrew Campbell	G	Southern Methodist
Houston Gamblers	Ray Childress	DT	Texas A&M
Houston Gamblers	Matt Darwin	C	Texas A&M
Houston Gamblers	Simon Fletcher	DE	Houston
Houston Gamblers	Kermit Foster	DT	Texas A&M
Houston Gamblers	Tyrone Graves	LB	Texas A&M-Kingsville
Houston Gamblers	Bruce Green	LB	Texas Southern
Houston Gamblers	Dale Hellestrae	OT	Southern Methodist
Houston Gamblers	James Holmes	LB	Houston
Houston Gamblers	Bobby Leach	WR	Southern Methodist
Houston Gamblers	Mark Lewis	TE	Texas A&M
Houston Gamblers	Tom Linebarger	DT	Southern Methodist
Houston Gamblers	John Mazur	QB	Texas A&M
Houston Gamblers	Scott McLaughlin	G	Rice
Houston Gamblers	Audray McMillian	DB	Houston
Houston Gamblers	Reggie Phillips	DB	Southern Methodist
Houston Gamblers	Ken Reeves	T	Texas A&M
Houston Gamblers	Rod Richardson	WR	Texas A&M
Houston Gamblers	Melvin Robinson	WR	Rice
Houston Gamblers	Thomas Sanders	RB	Texas A&M
Houston Gamblers	Mark Smith	T	Texas A&M-Kingsville
Houston Gamblers	Nate Steadman	G	Texas A&M
Houston Gamblers	Jimmy Teal	WR	Texas A&M
Houston Gamblers	Bryant Winn	LB	Houston
Jacksonville Bulls	Chip Andrews	P	Georgia
Jacksonville Bulls	Scott Bergold	DE	Wisconsin
Jacksonville Bulls	Peter Blazek	T	Georgia Tech
Jacksonville Bulls	Frank Bush	LB	North Carolina State
Jacksonville Bulls	Kevin Butler	K	Georgia
Jacksonville Bulls	Knox Culpepper	LB	Georgia
Jacksonville Bulls	Jeff Dellenbach	T	Wisconsin
Jacksonville Bulls	Kevin Harris	DB	Georgia
Jacksonville Bulls	Marck Harrison	RB	Wisconsin
Jacksonville Bulls	Johnny Hill	DB	Duke
Jacksonville Bulls	Richard Johnson	DB	Wisconsin
Jacksonville Bulls	Tony Kepano	G	Georgia Tech
Jacksonville Bulls	Robert Lavette	RB	Georgia Tech
Jacksonville Bulls	Joe McIntosh	RB	North Carolina State
Jacksonville Bulls	Jim Melka	LB	Wisconsin
Jacksonville Bulls	A.V. Richards	T	North Carolina State
Jacksonville Bulls	Jeff Sanchez	DB	Georgia
Jacksonville Bulls	Darryl Sims	DT	Wisconsin
Jacksonville Bulls	Ken Stills	DB	Wisconsin
Jacksonville Bulls	Al Toon	WR	Wisconsin
Jacksonville Bulls	Dan Turk	C	Wisconsin
Jacksonville Bulls	Mike Weaver	T	Georgia
Jacksonville Bulls	Ken Whisenhunt	TE	Georgia Tech
Jacksonville Bulls	Gary Wilkins	TE	Georgia Tech
Jacksonville Bulls	Scott Williams	TE	Georgia
Los Angeles Express	Damon Allen	QB	Fullerton State
Los Angeles Express	Paul Berner	QB	Pacific
Los Angeles Express	Duane Bickett	LB	Southern California
Los Angeles Express	Keith Biggers	LB	Southern California
Los Angeles Express	Mark Boyer	TE	Southern California
Los Angeles Express	Jeff Carter	P	Long Beach State
Los Angeles Express	Chris Corley	TE	South Carolina
Los Angeles Express	Jack Del Rio	LB	Southern California
Los Angeles Express	Daren Gilbert	T	Fullerton State
Los Angeles Express	Bryant Gilliard	DB	South Carolina
Los Angeles Express	Tommy Haynes	DB	Southern California
Los Angeles Express	John Hendy	DB	Long Beach State
Los Angeles Express	Ira Hillary	WR	South Carolina
Los Angeles Express	Neil Hope	LB	Southern California
Los Angeles Express	Darrel Hopper	DB	Southern California
Los Angeles Express	Earl Johnson	DB	South Carolina
Los Angeles Express	Steve Jordan	K	Southern California
Los Angeles Express	Kevin Junior	LB	Long Beach State
Los Angeles Express	Chuck Page	T	Long Beach State
Los Angeles Express	James Seawright	LB	South Carolina
Los Angeles Express	James Sumpter	LB	South Carolina
Los Angeles Express	Paul Vogel	LB	South Carolina
Los Angeles Express	Timmie Ware	WR	Southern California
Los Angeles Express	Del Wilkes	G	South Carolina
Los Angeles Express	Frank Wright	DT	South Carolina
Memphis Showboats	Ricky Anderson	K	Vanderbilt
Memphis Showboats	Danny Andrews	WR	UCLA
Memphis Showboats	Dwight Blalock	TE	Memphis
Memphis Showboats	Steve Bono	QB	UCLA
Memphis Showboats	Derrick Burroughs	DB	Memphis
Memphis Showboats	Neal Dellocono	LB	UCLA
Memphis Showboats	Jim Dralle	C	Vanderbilt
Memphis Showboats	Donnie Elder	DB	Memphis
Memphis Showboats	Vince Hall	RB	Middle Tennessee State
Memphis Showboats	Rick Hechinger	T	Memphis
Memphis Showboats	Herman Hunter	RB	Tennessee State
Memphis Showboats	Johnnie Jones	RB	Tennessee
Memphis Showboats	Tim Long	OG	Memphis
Memphis Showboats	Duval Love	OT	UCLA
Memphis Showboats	Bill Mayo	G	Tennessee
Memphis Showboats	Rob Monaco	T	Vanderbilt
Memphis Showboats	Jack Oliver	OG	Memphis
Memphis Showboats	Fuad Reveiz	K	Tennessee
Memphis Showboats	Chuck Scott	WR	Vanderbilt
Memphis Showboats	Tony Simmons	DT	Tennessee
Memphis Showboats	Alvin Toles	LB	Tennessee
Memphis Showboats	James Williams	RB	Memphis
Memphis Showboats	Manuel Young	DB	Vanderbilt
Memphis Showboats	Mike Young	WR	UCLA
Memphis Showboats	Carl Zander	LB	Tennessee
New Jersey Generals	Gerald Allen	LB	Syracuse
New Jersey Generals	Alan Andrews	TE	Rutgers
New Jersey Generals	Andrew Baker	WR	Rutgers
New Jersey Generals	Kelvin Bell	DB	Ohio State
New Jersey Generals	Vic Bellamy	DB	Syracuse
New Jersey Generals	Steve Calabria	QB	Colgate
New Jersey Generals	Jaime Covington	RB	Syracuse
New Jersey Generals	Dave Crecelius	DE	Ohio State
New Jersey Generals	Joe Estay	T	Mississippi State
New Jersey Generals	Doug Flutie	QB	Boston College
New Jersey Generals	Scott Gieselman	TE	Boston College
New Jersey Generals	Dwayne Hooper	RB	Rutgers
New Jersey Generals	Jamie Kimmel	LB	Syracuse
New Jersey Generals	Mark Krerowicz	T	Ohio State
New Jersey Generals	Jim Lachey	G	Ohio State
New Jersey Generals	Kirk Lowdermilk	C	Ohio State
New Jersey Generals	Dave Morrill	DE	Ohio State
New Jersey Generals	Gerard Phelan	WR	Boston College
New Jersey Generals	Eugene Robinson	DB	Colgate
New Jersey Generals	Todd Russell	DB	Boston College
New Jersey Generals	Tony Thurman	DB	Boston College
New Jersey Generals	Mike Tomczak	QB	Ohio State
New Jersey Generals	Lionel Washington	DE	Rutgers
New Jersey Generals	Elmer Wilson	RB	Mississippi State
New Jersey Generals	Scott Zalenski	G	Ohio State
Oakland Invaders	Kevin Bowman	WR	San Jose State
Oakland Invaders	Tom Briehl	LB	Stanford
Oakland Invaders	Bob Frasco	QB	San Jose State
Oakland Invaders	Steve Gibson	DE	Cal Poly (San Luis Obispo)
Oakland Invaders	Gale Gilbert	QB	California
Oakland Invaders	Owen Gill	RB	Iowa
Oakland Invaders	Mark Harmon	K	Stanford
Oakland Invaders	Emile Harry	WR	Stanford
Oakland Invaders	Mike Hooks	LB	Iowa
Oakland Invaders	Keith Hunter	DB	Iowa
Oakland Invaders	Terry Jackson	DT	Stanford
Oakland Invaders	Damone Johnson	TE	Cal Poly (San Luis Obispo)
Oakland Invaders	George Little	DT	Iowa
Oakland Invaders	Brent Martin	C	Stanford
Oakland Invaders	Terry McDonald	LB	San Jose State
Oakland Invaders	Rance McDougald	WR	California
Oakland Invaders	Matt Moran	G	Stanford
Oakland Invaders	Tom Neville	T	Fresno State
Oakland Invaders	Ray Noble	DB	California
Oakland Invaders	Tony Smith	WR	San Jose State
Oakland Invaders	Kevin Spitzig	LB	Iowa
Oakland Invaders	Dave Strobel	LB	Iowa
Oakland Invaders	Gary Swanson	LB	Cal Poly (San Luis Obispo)
Oakland Invaders	Garin Veris	DE	Stanford
Oakland Invaders	Larry Willis	WR	Fresno State
Orlando Renegades	Willie Broughton	DE	Miami (Florida)
Orlando Renegades	Eddie Brown	WR	Miami (Florida)
Orlando Renegades	Dallas Cameron	DT	Miami (Florida)
Orlando Renegades	Glen Campbell	T	Wake Forest
Orlando Renegades	Juan Comendeiro	G	Miami (Florida)
Orlando Renegades	Myles Darling	DB	South Carolina State
Orlando Renegades	Ty Davis	DB	Clemson
Orlando Renegades	K.D. Dunn	TE	Clemson
Orlando Renegades	Joe Ellis	T	Clemson
Orlando Renegades	Mike Eppley	QB	Clemson
Orlando Renegades	Malcolm Hairston	LB	Wake Forest
Orlando Renegades	Reid Ingle	T	Clemson
Orlando Renegades	Lester Lyles	DB	Virginia
Orlando Renegades	Ron Mattes	DE	Virginia
Orlando Renegades	Bobby Morrison	T	Wake Forest
Orlando Renegades	Bob Olderman	G	Virginia
Orlando Renegades	William Perry	DT	Clemson
Orlando Renegades	Reggie Pleasant	DB	Clemson
Orlando Renegades	Stanley Shakespeare	WR	Miami
Orlando Renegades	Ian Sinclair	C	Miami
Orlando Renegades	Dale Swing	C	Clemson
Orlando Renegades	Dana Thyhsen	QB	Central Florida
Orlando Renegades	Alvin Ward	G	Miami
Orlando Renegades	Ronald Watson	DB	Clemson
Orlando Renegades	Mark Wiley	DE	Virginia
Portland Breakers	Richard Byrd	DT	Southern Mississippi
Portland Breakers	Ricky Chatman	LB	Louisiana State
Portland Breakers	Jeff Dale	DB	Louisiana State
Portland Breakers	Sam Dejarnette	RB	Southern Mississippi
Portland Breakers	Gregg Dubroc	LB	Louisiana State
Portland Breakers	Danny Greene	WR	Washington
Portland Breakers	Greg Haeusler	LB	Southern Mississippi
Portland Breakers	Liffort Hobley	DB	Louisiana State
Portland Breakers	Ron Holmes	DT	Washington
Portland Breakers	Joe Krakoski	LB	Washington
Portland Breakers	Freddie Lewis	LB	Louisiana State
Portland Breakers	Tony Lewis	DT	Washington
Portland Breakers	Calvin Magee	TE	Southern University
Portland Breakers	Eric Martin	WR	Louisiana State
Portland Breakers	Tim Meamber	LB	Washington
Portland Breakers	Mark Pattison	WR	Washington
Portland Breakers	Reginald Pugh	RB	Grambling State
Portland Breakers	Al Robertson	G	Washington
Portland Breakers	Jim Rodgers	DB	Washington
Portland Breakers	Fred Small	LB	Washington
Portland Breakers	Lance Smith	T	Louisiana State
Portland Breakers	Treg Songy	DB	Tulane
Portland Breakers	James White	C	Louisiana State
Portland Breakers	Tony Wood	K	Tulane
Portland Breakers	Tony Wroten	TE	Washington
San Antonio Gunslingers	Joel Barrett	TE	Baylor
San Antonio Gunslingers	Nikita Blair	LB	Texas-El Paso
San Antonio Gunslingers	Gregg Bomkamp	DT	Baylor
San Antonio Gunslingers	Danny Bradley	QB	Oklahoma
San Antonio Gunslingers	Brent Burks	T	Oklahoma
San Antonio Gunslingers	Pat Coryatt	DT	Baylor
San Antonio Gunslingers	Ralph Darnell	DT	Texas
San Antonio Gunslingers	Tony Degrate	DT	Texas
San Antonio Gunslingers	Tommy Flemons	DT	Oklahoma
San Antonio Gunslingers	David Glasco	DB	Texas State
San Antonio Gunslingers	Jerry Gray	DB	Texas
San Antonio Gunslingers	Kevin Hancock	LB	Baylor
San Antonio Gunslingers	Bill Heathcock	DT	Texas
San Antonio Gunslingers	June James	LB	Texas
San Antonio Gunslingers	Jerome Ledbetter	RB	Oklahoma
San Antonio Gunslingers	Paul Mergenhagen	DT	Baylor
San Antonio Gunslingers	Terry Orr	RB	Texas
San Antonio Gunslingers	Ervin Randle	DB	Baylor
San Antonio Gunslingers	Buster Rhymes	WR	Oklahoma
San Antonio Gunslingers	Jim Rockford	DB	Oklahoma
San Antonio Gunslingers	Glenn Saterfield	RB	Angelo State
San Antonio Gunslingers	Buzz Sawyer	P	Baylor
San Antonio Gunslingers	Freddie Sims	RB	Oklahoma
San Antonio Gunslingers	Tony Staten	DB	Angelo State
San Antonio Gunslingers	Chuck Thomas	C	Oklahoma
Tampa Bay Bandits	Billy Allen	RB	Florida State
Tampa Bay Bandits	Greg Allen	RB	Florida State
Tampa Bay Bandits	John Bostic	DB	Bethune-Cookman
Tampa Bay Bandits	Phil Bromley	C	Florida
Tampa Bay Bandits	Darryl Drew	LB	Florida A&M
Tampa Bay Bandits	Ricky Easmon	DB	Florida
Tampa Bay Bandits	Russell Gallon	DE	Florida
Tampa Bay Bandits	Kevin Glover	C	Maryland
Tampa Bay Bandits	Lorenzo Hampton	RB	Florida
Tampa Bay Bandits	Jessie Hester	WR	Florida State
Tampa Bay Bandits	Billy Hinson	G	Florida
Tampa Bay Bandits	Don Jefferson	DB	Florida A&M
Tampa Bay Bandits	Cedric Jones	RB	Florida State
Tampa Bay Bandits	Crawford Ker	G	Florida
Tampa Bay Bandits	Tim Newton	DT	Florida
Tampa Bay Bandits	Chris Perkins	K	Florida
Tampa Bay Bandits	Bobby Raymond	K	Florida
Tampa Bay Bandits	Frank Reich	QB	Maryland
Tampa Bay Bandits	Eric Riley	DB	Florida State
Tampa Bay Bandits	Charles Robinson	T	Bethune-Cookman
Tampa Bay Bandits	William Rogers	TE	Maryland
Tampa Bay Bandits	Roger Sibbald	DB	Florida
Tampa Bay Bandits	Henry Taylor	LB	Florida State
Tampa Bay Bandits	Eric Wilson	LB	Maryland
Tampa Bay Bandits	Almon Young	G	Bethune-Cookman
