= Ed Block Courage Award =

Annual NFL sportsmanship award

- Awarded for: Courage, sportsmanship, and inspiration in the NFL
- Country: United States
- Presented by: Ed Block Courage Award Foundation
- First award: 1984
- Website: edblock.org

The Ed Block Courage Award is an annual award presented to a player from each team in the National Football League (NFL) who are voted for by their teammates as role models of inspiration, sportsmanship, and courage. Named in memory of Ed Block, a humanitarian and athletic trainer for the Baltimore Colts, the award is administered by the Ed Block Courage Award Foundation. Sponsorship proceeds promote the prevention of child abuse by raising awareness of the epidemic and assisting agencies who provide for the care and treatment of abused children.

== Purpose and development ==
Ed Block was head athletic trainer for the Baltimore Colts from 1954 to 1977. He had earned a master's degree from the University of Missouri in 1937 and, following service as an army officer in World War II, a doctorate in rehabilitation and physical therapy from Columbia University. Block was also a physical therapist at a Baltimore, Maryland, hospital for disabled children. Following his retirement as Colts' trainer, local community leaders led by Baltimore businessman Sam Lamantia Jr. began an annual award in Block's honor in 1978, recognizing a Colts player for outstanding character. In 1984, the award was expanded when players on other NFL teams began to be similarly recognized. In 1986, the Ed Block Courage Award Foundation was incorporated as a charitable organization with Sam Lamantia Jr. as its CEO. The Ed Block Courage Award has since expanded to all 32 NFL teams.

The Baltimore-based foundation's twin objectives are to celebrate players of inspiration in the NFL and to raise public awareness and support prevention of child abuse. Radio public service announcements, along with televised programs, internet, and print media, are used by the foundation in furtherance of its mission.

== Award selection and presentation ==
Every year, active players on each of the 32 teams in the National Football League vote for one member of their team who, in their eyes, "exemplify commitment to the principles of sportsmanship and courage". Those players selected are announced in late December.

Each March, the 32 selected players receive their Ed Block Courage Award at a banquet held in Baltimore. Past recipients include Robbie Gould, Joe Montana, Peyton Manning, and Dan Marino. The award trophy itself is a pewtered football helmet with the recipient's team logo and engraved with the player's name, team and year.

== "Courage Houses" and other endeavors ==
The foundation has developed a national network of "Courage Houses" that help disadvantaged, neglected, and abused children. There are currently 27 Courage Houses across the country, each one tied to an NFL team.

NFL team	Courage House
Atlanta Falcons	Eagle Ranch
Baltimore Ravens	St. Vincent's Villa
Carolina Panthers	Children's Home Society of North Carolina
Chicago Bears	Maryville Academy
Cleveland Browns	Providence House
Dallas Cowboys	Happy Hill Farm Academy
Detroit Lions	Haven
Green Bay Packers	Family Service of Northeast Wisconsin
Indianapolis Colts	Children's Bureau, Inc.
Minnesota Vikings	Catholic Charities of St. Paul and Minneapolis
New Orleans Saints	Rickey Jackson Community Hope Foundation
New York Giants	My Sisters' Place
Oakland Raiders	Fred Finch Youth Center
Philadelphia Eagles	Children's Crisis Treatment Center
Los Angeles Chargers	Casa De Amparo
Seattle Seahawks	Childhaven
St. Louis (NFL)	Our Little Haven
Washington Commanders	Youth for Tomorrow
Pittsburgh Steelers	Holy Family Institute
Buffalo Bills	Gateway Longview
Jacksonville Jaguars	Neighbor to Family
Houston Texans	Houston Texans YMCA
San Francisco 49ers	Edgewood Center for Children
New England Patriots	Key Program, Inc.
New York Jets	Deirdre's House
Tennessee Titans	The YMCA of Middle Tennessee
Los Angeles Rams	A Place Called Home

The foundation also sponsors the Baltimore Sports Media Hall of Fame Award and presents the Professional Football Athletic Training Staff of the Year Award. The Pro Football Weekly Assistant Coach of the Year Award is also presented at the annual Courage Awards Gala.

== Winners ==
=== AFC East ===
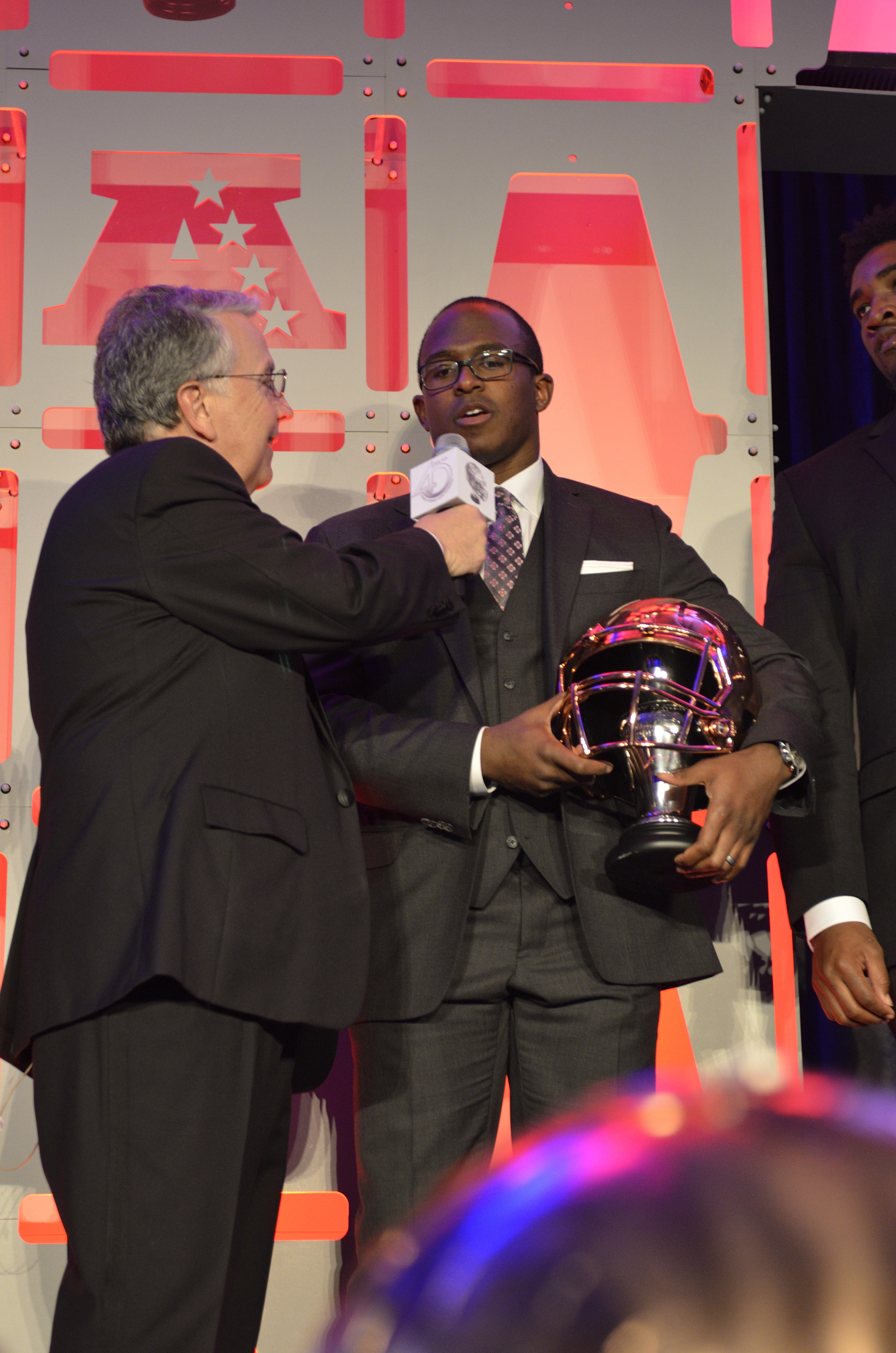
Matthew Slater in 2017

Ed Block Courage Award Recipient History – AFC East
Year	Buffalo Bills	Miami Dolphins	New England Patriots	New York Jets
1984	Steve Freeman	Nat Moore	Steve Grogan	Joe Fields
1985	Jerry Butler	Woody Bennett	Pete Brock	Johnny Lynn
1986	Lucius Sanford	Charles Bowser	Steve Nelson	Dan Alexander
1987	Robb Riddick	Jon Giesler	Lin Dawson	Joe Klecko
1988	Tim Volger	Glenn Blackwood	Garin Veris	Tom Baldwin
1989	Steve Tasker	Don McNeal	Kenneth Sims	Ken O'Brien
1990	Darryl Talley	Liffort Hobley	Ronnie Lippett	Freeman McNeil
1991	Mark Kelso	Sammie Smith	Fred Marion	Paul Frase
1992	Bruce Smith	John Grimsley	Irving Fryar	Dale Dawkins
1993	John Davis	John Offerdahl	Bruce Armstrong	Lonnie Young
1994	Kent Hull	Troy Vincent	Tim Goad	Jim Sweeney
1995	Jim Kelly	Dan Marino	Vincent Brown	Kyle Clifton
1996	Mark Maddox	Bernie Parmalee	Sam Gash	Siupeli Malamala
1997	Henry Jones	O. J. McDuffie	Dave Meggett	David Williams
1998	John Holecek	Larry Izzo	Troy Brown	Pepper Johnson
1999	Sean Moran	O. J. Brigance	Drew Bledsoe	Marvin Jones
2000	Joe Panos	Daryl Gardener	Tedy Bruschi	Jason Fabini
2001	Jerry Ostroski	Scott Galyon	Ted Johnson	Curtis Martin
2002	Tony Driver	Robert Edwards	Joe Andruzzi	Vinny Testaverde
2003	Pat Williams	Jamie Nails	Mike Vrabel	Dave Szott
2004	Travis Henry	David Bowens	Rosevelt Colvin	Chad Pennington
2005	Mark Campbell	Yeremiah Bell	Tedy Bruschi	Wayne Chrebet
2006	Takeo Spikes	Zach Thomas	Rodney Harrison	Chris Baker
2007	Kevin Everett	André Goodman	Steve Neal	Laveranues Coles
2008	Chris Kelsay	Ronnie Brown	Sammy Morris	Jerricho Cotchery
2009	James Hardy	Justin Smiley	Tom Brady	David Harris
2010	Jairus Byrd	Patrick Cobbs	Wes Welker	Shaun Ellis
2011	Andra Davis	Jake Long	Marcus Cannon	Brandon Moore
2012	Kyle Williams	Anthony McDaniel	Logan Mankins	Jeff Cumberland
2013	Marcus Easley	Paul Soliai	Sebastian Vollmer	Isaiah Trufant
2014	Arthur Moats	Brandon Gibson	Rob Gronkowski	Rontez Miles
2015	Cordy Glenn	Branden Albert	Jerod Mayo	Ryan Fitzpatrick
2016	Stephon Gilmore	Cameron Wake	Nate Solder	Muhammad Wilkerson
2017	Jordan Poyer	Mike Pouncey	Matthew Slater	Lawrence Thomas
2018	Taiwan Jones	Ryan Tannehill	Nate Ebner	Quincy Enunwa
2019	Kyle Peko	Albert Wilson	Julian Edelman	Bilal Powell
2020	Jon Feliciano	Bobby McCain	Devin McCourty	Ryan Griffin
2020	Jon Feliciano	Bobby McCain	James White	Ryan Griffin
2021	Harrison Phillips	Elandon Roberts	Brandon King	Ashtyn Davis
2022	Tre'Davious White	Alec Ingold	Jakobi Meyers	Vinny Curry
2023	Damar Hamlin	Austin Jackson	David Andrews	Breece Hall
2023	Damar Hamlin	Austin Jackson	Jonathan Jones	Breece Hall
2024	Spencer Brown	Jaelan Phillips	Cole Strange	Alijah Vera-Tucker

=== AFC North ===
Ed Block Courage Award Recipient History – AFC North
Year	Baltimore Ravens (Baltimore Colts)	Cincinnati Bengals	Cleveland Browns	Pittsburgh Steelers
1984	Baltimore Colts Winners (1978–1983)	Brian Pillman		Eric Williams
1985	(Joe Ehrmann, 1978)	Tim Krumrie	Willie Adams	Pete Rostosky
1986	(Fred Cook, 1979)	Dave Rimingon	Carl Hairston	Gary Dunn
1987	(Ken Mendenhall, 1980)	Rodney A. Holman	Ozzie Newsome	Dwayne Woodruff
1988	(Herb Orvis, 1981)	Eddie Edwards	Earnest Byner	Greg Lloyd
1989	(Mike Woods, 1982)	Boomer Esiason	Eddie Johnson	Keith Willis
1990	(Nesby Glasgow, 1983)	Joe Walter	Cody Risien	John Rienstra
1991		Bruce Reimers	Mark Harper	Mike Mularkey
1992		Kevin Walker	Lawyer Tillman	Hardy Nickerson
1993		Bruce Kozerski	Patrick Rowe	Gary Jones
1994		Ricardo McDonald	Carl Banks	Charles Johnson
1995		David Klinger	Bennie Thompson	Jerry Olsavsky
1996	Anthony Pleasant	James Francis		Rod Woodson
1997	Wally Williams	Scott Brumfield		Mark Bruener
1998	Stevon Moore	Ki-Jana Carter		Tim Lester
1999	Peter Boulware	Tom Tumulty	Derrick Alexander	Chad Scott
2000	Anthony Poindexter	John Jackson	Jamir Miller	Dermontti Dawson
2001	Corey Harris	Rich Braham	Jeremy McKinney	Wayne Gandy
2002	Ethan Brooks	Richmond Webb	Mark Campbell	Amos Zereoué
2003	Marques Douglas	Glen Steele	Courtney Brown	Mike Logan
2004	Orlando Brown Sr.	Willie Anderson	Lee Suggs	Kendall Simmons
2005	Dale Carter	Rashad Bauman	Kenard Lang	Casey Hampton
2006	Corey Ivy	Carson Palmer	Phil Dawson	Travis Kirschke
2007	Samari Rolle	Reggie Kelly	Gary Baxter	Ben Roethlisberger
2008	Ed Reed	Rashad Jeanty	Joe Jurevicius	Ryan Clark
2009	Dawan Landry	Bobbie Williams	Mike Furrey	Aaron Smith
2010	Donté Stallworth	Cedric Benson	Eric Barton	Nick Eason
2011	Morgan Cox	Mike Nugent	D'Qwell Jackson	Max Starks
2012	Terrell Suggs	Leon Hall	Reggie Hodges	Willie Colon
2013	Jameel McClain	Robert Geathers	T. J. Ward	Heath Miller
2014	Lardarius Webb	Devon Still	Desmond Bryant	Sean Spence
2015	Dennis Pitta	Tyler Eifert	Alex Mack	William Gay
2016	Matt Elam	James Wright	Joe Haden	Maurkice Pouncey
2017	Benjamin Watson	Giovani Bernard	Kevin Zeitler	Artie Burns
2018	Marshal Yanda	Jeff Driskel	Terrance Mitchell	Ryan Shazier
2019	Brandon Carr	Ryan Glasgow	Juston Burris	James Conner
2020	Mark Andrews	Geno Atkins	Nick Chubb	Stephon Tuitt
2021	Tavon Young	D. J. Reader	Grant Delpit	Devin Bush Jr.
2022	Marcus Peters	Logan Wilson	Jack Conklin	Tyson Alualu
2023	Kevon Seymour	Chidobe Awuzie	Anthony Walker Jr.	Calvin Austin III
2024	Keaton Mitchell	Tycen Anderson	Nick Chubb	Cory Trice Jr.

=== AFC South ===
Ed Block Courage Award Recipient History – AFC South
Year	Houston Texans (Houston Oilers)	Indianapolis Colts	Jacksonville Jaguars	Tennessee Titans (Tennessee Oilers)
1984	(Bob Hamm)	Cliff Odom		
1985	(Pat Howell)	Karl Baldischwiler		
1986	(Dean Steinkuhler)	Anthony Young		
1987	(Kent Hill)	Barry Krauss		
1988	(Alonzo Highsmith)	Ben Utt		
1989	(Douglas Smith)	Chip Banks		
1990	(Mike Munchak)	Harvey L. Armstrong		
1991	(Bubba McDowell)	Quintus McDonald		
1992	(Warren Moon)	Kevin Call		
1993	(Curtis Duncan)	Steve Emtman		
1994	(Marcus Robertson)	Tony McCoy		
1995	(Barron Wortham)	Wendell Davis	Paul Frase	
1996	(Blaine Bishop)	Eugene Daniel	Derek Brown	
1997		Jason Besler	Dave Thomas	(Bruce Matthews)
1998		Jeff Herrod	Mark Brunell	(Steve Jackson)
1999		Cornelius Bennett	James Stewart	Steve McNair
2000		Bernard Whittington	Tony Boselli	Kenny Holmes
2001		Peyton Manning	Jimmy Smith	Kevin Dyson
2002	Jason Bell	Rob Morris	Fred Taylor	Eddie George
2003	Aaron Glenn	Chad Bratzke	Tony Brackens	Kevin Carter
2004	Seth Payne	Gary Brackett	David Garrad	Keith Bulluck
2005	Jabar Gaffney	Cato June	Paul Spicer	Tank Williams
2006	Kailee Wong	Reggie Wayne	Jorge Cordova	Brandon Jones
2007	Anthony Weaver	Ryan Lilja	Greg Jones	David Thornton
2008	Harry Williams	Jeff Saturday	Brad Meester	Chris Hope
2009	Zac Diles	Marlin Jackson	Richard Collier	Kevin Mawae
2010	Joel Dreesen	Dwight Freeney	Aaron Kampman	Will Witherspoon
2011	DeMeco Ryans	Robert Mathis	Jarett Dillard	Derrick Morgan
2012	Matt Shaub	Antoine Bethea	John Chick	Kenny Britt
2013	Brian Cushing	Cory Redding	Will Rackley	David Stewart
2014	David Quessenberry	Dwayne Allen	Roy Miller	Michael Griffin
2015	Jadeveon Clowney	Joe Reitz	Allen Robinson	Craig Stevens
2016	Duane Brown	Andrew Luck	Sen'Derrick Marks	Jason McCourty
2017	Derek Newton	Clayton Geathers	Aaron Colvin	Karl Klug
2018	Andre Hal	Jack Doyle	Tommy Bohanon	Jack Conklin
2019	Justin Reid	Jabaal Sheard	Cam Robinson	Jonnu Smith
2020	Dylan Cole	Rigoberto Sanchez	James O'Shaughnessy	Jeffery Simmons
2021	Justin Britt	T. Y. Hilton	Tre Herndon	Nick Westbrook-Ikhine
2022	Tavierre Thomas	Shaquille Leonard	Travis Etienne	Robert Woods
2023	John Metchie III	Tyquan Lewis	Dawuane Smoot	Dillon Radunz
2024	Dylan Horton	DeForest Buckner	Ventrell Miller	Ryan Stonehouse

=== AFC West ===
Ed Block Courage Award Recipient History – AFC West
Year	Denver Broncos	Kansas City Chiefs	Las Vegas Raiders	Los Angeles Chargers
1984	Keith Bishop	Dave Lutz	Dave Dalby	Pete Holohan
1985	Rulon Jones	Kevin Ross	Mark Wilson	Don Macek
1986	Rubin Carter	Mark Robinson	Frank Hawkins	Woodrow Lowe
1987	Dennis Smith	Dino Hackett	Jerry Robinson	Eric Sievers
1988	Gerald Wilhite	Lloyd Burruss	Marcus Allen	Gill Byrd
1989	Rick Dennison	Christian Okoye	Lionel Washington	Leslie O'Neal
1990	Keith Kartz	Deron Cherry	Tim Brown	Leo Goeas
1991	John Elway	J. C. Pearson	Steve Wright	Joe Philips
1992	Dennis Smith	Rich Baldinger	Todd Peat	Blaise Winter
1993	Simon Fletcher	Albert Lewis	Winston Moss	Derrick Walker
1994	Rondell Jones	Neil Smith	Jeff Hostetler	Joe Milinichik
1995	Dave Wyman	John Alt	Dan Mosebar	Eric Moten
1996	Ed McCaffrey	Dave Szott	Terry McDaniel	Courtney Hall
1997	Steve Atwater	Lake Dawson	Pat Harlow	Junior Seau
1998	Tony Jones	Glenn Parker	Harvey Williams	Kurt Gouveia
1999	Rod Smith	Tim Grunhard	Eric Allen	Charles Dimry
2000	John Mobley	Eric Hicks	Matt Stinchcomb	John Parrella
2001	Terrell Davis	Tony Richardson	Randy Jordan	Raylee Johnson
2002	Keith Burns	John Browning	Jerry Porter	Jamal Williams
2003	Tom Nalen	Jerome Woods	Barret Robbins	Adrian Dingle
2004	Dan Neil	Priest Holmes	Sam Williams	Terrance Kiel
2005	Dwayne Carswell	Will Shields	Jarrod Cooper	Randall Godfrey
2006	Louis Green	Benny Sapp	Ronald Curry	Carlos Polk
2007	John Engelberger	Eddie Kennison	Justin Fargas	Darren Sproles
2008	Marquand Manuel	Damon Huard	Jake Grove	Nick Hardwick
2009	Brian Dawkins	Brodie Croyle	Tyvon Branch	Shawne Merriman
2010	Ryan Clady	Dustin Colquitt	Robert Gallery	Jeromey Clary
2011	Elvis Dumervil	Jon McGraw	Trevor Scott	Curtis Brinkley
2012	Chris Kuper	Jamaal Charles	Travis Goethel	Quentin Jammer
2013	Knowshon Moreno	Rodney Hudson	Khalif Barnes	Vincent Brown
2014	Chris Harris Jr.	Travis Kelce	D. J. Hayden	Malcom Floyd
2015	Danny Trevathan	Eric Berry	Rod Streater	Danny Woodhead
2015	Brandon Marshall	Eric Berry	Rod Streater	Danny Woodhead
2016	Matt Paradis	Justin Houston	Jon Condo	Keenan Allen
2017	Todd Davis	Derrick Johnson	Derek Carr	Brandon Mebane
2018	Jeff Heuerman	Dee Ford	Jared Cook	Jason Verrett
2019	Andy Janovich	Eric Fisher	Denzelle Good	Hunter Henry
2020	Bradley Chubb	Austin Reiter	Gabe Jackson	Forrest Lamp
2021	Courtland Sutton	Joe Thuney	Solomon Thomas	Derwin James
2021	Wade Harman	Joe Thuney	Solomon Thomas	Derwin James
2022	K. J. Hamler	Joe Thuney	Josh Jacobs	Khalil Mack
2023	Javonte Williams	Patrick Mahomes	Robert Spillane	Jalen Guyton
2024	P. J. Locke	Isiah Pacheco	Dalton Wagner	J. K. Dobbins

=== NFC East ===
Ed Block Courage Award Recipient History – NFC East
Year	Dallas Cowboys	New York Giants	Philadelphia Eagles	Washington Commanders
1984	James Jones	John Tuggle	John Spagnola	Mark May
1985	Howard Richards	Kevin Belcher	Ron Jaworski	Ken Huff
1986	Tony Dorsett	Zeke Mowatt	Jody Schulz	Darryl Grant
1987	Brian Baldinger	Terry Kinard	Gerald Feehery	Mel Kaufman
1988	Randy White	Karl Nelson	Wes Hopkins	Doug Williams
1989	Ed "Too Tall" Jones	Sean Landeta	Mike Quick	Neal Olkewicz
1990	Kelvin Martin	Mark Bavaro	Ron Solt	Joe Jacoby
1991	Ken Norton Jr.	Adrian White	David Alexander	Don Warren
1992	Daryl Johnston	Erik Howard	Jerome Brown	A. J. Johnson
1993	Bill Bates	George Thornton	Andre Roberts	Art Monk
1994	Mark Stepnoski	John "Jumbo" Elliott	Fred Barnett	Mark Schlereth
1995	Erik Williams	Chris Calloway	Charlie Garner	Keith Taylor
1996	Kevin Smith	Scott Davis	Kevin Turner	Ed Simmons
1997	Tony Tolbert	Brian Williams	Rhett Hall	James Jenkins
1998	Darren Woodson	Ike Hilliard	Bobby Taylor	Darrell Green
1999	Ernie Mills	LeShon Johnson	Mike Mamula	Tre' Johnson
2000	Greg Ellis	Brad Daluiso	Cecil Martin	James Thrash
2001	Mike Lucky	Tiki Barber	Duce Staley	Cory Raymer
2002	Dat Nguyen	Keith Hamilton	Shawn Barber	Chris Samuels
2003	Jamar Martin	Rich Seubert	Correll Buckhalter	Fred Smoot
2004	Julius Jones	Shaun Williams	Derrick Burgess	Brandon Noble
2005	Dan Campbell	Michael Strahan	Chad Lewis	Khary Campbell
2006	Flozell Adams	Carlos Emmons	Jerome McDougle	Randy Thomas
2007	Jeremiah Ratliff	Amani Toomer	Montae Reagor	Marcus Washington
2008	Keith Davis	Jeff Feagles	Jon Dorenbos	Reed Doughty
2009	Kyle Kosier	Fred Robbins	Michael Vick	Phillip Daniels
2010	Sam Hurd	Kenny Phillips	Jason Avant	Ma'ake Kemoeatu
2011	Tony Romo	Mathias Kiwanuka	Mike Patterson	Stephen Bowen
2012	Jason Witten	Chris Canty	Colt Anderson	Kory Lichtensteiger
2013	Barry Church	Terrell Thomas	Jason Kelce	Robert Griffin III
2014	Tyrone Crawford	Mark Herzlich	Jeremy Maclin	Keenan Robinson
2015	Sean Lee	Daniel Fells	Fletcher Cox	Morgan Moses
2016	Terrell McClain	Victor Cruz	Nolan Carroll	Niles Paul
2017	Jaylon Smith	Jason Pierre-Paul	Joe Walker	DeAngelo Hall
2018	Zack Martin	Odell Beckham Jr.	Carson Wentz	Chris Thompson
2019	Travis Frederick	Michael Thomas	Brandon Brooks	Alex Smith
2020	Leighton Vander Esch	Dalvin Thomlinson	Joe Ostman	Brandon Scherff
2021	Dak Prescott	Saquon Barkley	Rodney McLeod	Deshazor Everett
2022	Michael Gallup	Nick Gates	Brandon Graham	Brian Robinson Jr.
2023	Jourdan Lewis	Sterling Shepard	Avonte Maddox	Tyler Larsen
2024	DeMarvion Overshown	Micah McFadden	Sydney Brown	Jeremy Reaves

=== NFC North ===
Ed Block Courage Award Recipient History – NFC North
Year	Chicago Bears	Detroit Lions	Green Bay Packers	Minnesota Vikings
1984	Danny Rains	Ken Fantetti	Ron Cassidy	Steve Riley
1985	Mark Bortz	Steve Mott	Ezra Johnson	Keith Nord
1986	Mike Tomczak	Keith Dorney	Karl Swanke	Walker Lee Ashley
1987	Ron Morris	Duane Galloway	Keith Uecker	Scott Studwell
1988	Glen Kozlowski	Carl Bland	Mark Murphy	Leo Lewis
1989	Ron Rivera	Jimmy Williams	Herman Fontenot	Jim Gustafson
1990	Lemuel Stinson	Bruce McNorton	Perry Kemp	Gary Zimmerman
1991	John Wojciechowski	Mike Utley	Vai Sikahema	Terry Allen
1992	Shaun Gayle	Ken Dallafior	Tootie Robbins	Darrin Nelson
1993	Keith Van Horne	Kevin Glover	Johnny Holland	Henry Thomas
1994	Kevin Butler	Victor Jones	George Teague	Cris Carter
1995	Vinson Smith	Aubrey Matthews	Reggie White	John Randle
1996	John Mangum	Bennie Blades	Brett Favre	Scottie Graham
1997	James O. Williams	Ray Roberts	Robert Brooks	Robert Smith
1998	John Thierry	George Jamison	Craig Newsome	Randall Cunningham
1999	Ryan Wetnight	Dan Owens	Earl Dotson	Robert Griffith
2000	Clyde Simmons	James Jones	Josh Bidwell	Gary Anderson
2001	Jim Miller	Charlie Batch	Santana Dotson	Daunte Culpepper
2002	Ted Washington	Cory Schlesinger	Kabeer Gbaja-Biamila	Lewis Kelly
2003	Dustin Lyman	Robert Porcher	Gilbert Brown	Eric Kelly
2004	Marc Colombo	Jared DeVries	Marco Rivera	Corey Chavous
2005	Ruben Brown	Boss Bailey	Donald Driver	Koren Robinson
2006	Rex Grossman	Ricky Sandoval	Jon Ryan	Matt Birk
2007	Tommie Harris	Kevin Jones	Chris Francies	Chad Greenway
2008	Charles Tillman	Daniel Bullocks	Mark Tauscher	Kenechi Udeze
2009	Israel Idonije	Jeff Backus	Nick Collins	E. J. Henderson
2010	Anthony Adams	Jason Hanson	Charles Woodson	Cedric Griffin
2011	Brian Urlacher	Shaun Hill	T. J. Lang	Anthony Herrera
2012	Nick Roach	Jahvid Best	Tramon Williams	Adrian Peterson
2013	Patrick Mannelly	Nate Burleson	Johnny Jolly	Kevin Williams
2014	Matt Slauson	Calvin Johnson	Jordy Nelson	Greg Jennings
2015	Robbie Gould	Joique Bell	Sam Barrington	Phil Loadholt
2016	Pernell McPhee	Matthew Stafford	Jayrone Elliott	Teddy Bridgewater
2017	Kyle Long	Ameer Abdullah	Mike Daniels	Kyle Rudolph
2018	Zach Miller	Kerry Hyder	Aaron Rodgers	Everson Griffen
2019	Allen Robinson	Kenny Golladay	Mason Crosby	Linval Joseph
2020	Roquan Smith	Marvin Jones Jr.	Billy Turner	Cam Smith
2021	Tarik Cohen	Trey Flowers	Aaron Jones	Anthony Barr
2022	Eddie Jackson	Romeo Okwara	De'Vondre Campbell	Blake Proehl
2023	Jack Sanborn	Frank Ragnow	Rashan Gary	Brian O'Neill
2024	Kyler Gordon	Joshua Paschal	Josh Myers	T. J. Hockenson

=== NFC South ===
Ed Block Courage Award Recipient History – NFC South
Year	Atlanta Falcons	Carolina Panthers	New Orleans Saints	Tampa Bay Buccaneers
1984	Jeff Van Note		Del Williams	Theo Bell
1985	Billy Johnson		Derland Moore	Steve Courson
1986	William Andrews		Hokie Gajan	J. D. Maarleveld
1987	Jeff Kiewel		Stan Brock	Nathan Wonsley
1988	Bret Clark		Rueben Mayes	Don Smith
1989	Kenny Flowers		Brad Edelman	John Cannon
1990	Mike Kenn		Rickey Jackson	Ron Hall
1991	John Rade		Wayne Martin	Harry Hamilton
1992	Mike Gann		Vince Buck	Ricky Reynolds
1993	Jumpy Geathers		Frank Warren	Rob Taylor
1994	Craig Heyward		Sam Mills	Tony Covington
1995	Alton Montgomery	Brett Maxie	Lee DeRamus	Paul Gruber
1996	Bobby Hebert	Lamar Lathon	Jim Dombrowski	Charles Dimry
1997	Jessie Tuggle	Tim Biakabutuka	Heath Shuler	Horace Copeland
1998	Bobby Christian	Steve Beuerlein	Aaron Craver	Warrick Dunn
1999	Byron Hanspard	Mike Minter	Troy Wilson	Hardy Nickerson
2000	Jamal Anderson	Muhsin Muhammad	Joe Johnson	Derrick Brooks
2001	Shawn Jefferson	Patrick Jeffers	Charlie Clemons	Jerry Wunsch
2002	Chris Draft	Kevin Donnalley	Fred Thomas	John Lynch
2003	Ed Jasper	DeShaun Foster	Darren Howard	Joe Jurevicius
2004	Roberto Garza	Mark Fields	Willie Whitehead	Mike Alstott
2005	Justin Griffith	Steve Smith Sr.	ENTIRE TEAM	John Wade
2006	Kevin Mathis	Colin Branch	Deuce McAllister	Shelton Quarles
2007	Alge Crumpler	Mike Rucker	Roman Harper	Jeff Garcia
2008	Brian Finneran	Jake Delhomme	Jonathan Vilma	Matt Bryant
2009	Coy Wire	Dan Connor	Anthony Hargrove	Cadillac Williams
2010	Brian Williams	Jordan Gross	Heath Evans	Earnest Graham
2011	Kerry Meier	Thomas Davis	Jimmy Graham	Ronde Barber
2012	Jason Snelling	Ron Edwards	Mark Ingram II	Davin Joseph
2013	Roddy White	Ryan Kalil	Marques Colston	Darrelle Revis
2014	Corey Peters	Greg Olsen	Patrick Robinson	Vincent Jackson
2015	Adrian Clayborn	Cam Newton	Delvin Breaux	Clinton McDonald
2016	Kemal Ishmael	Luke Kuechly	Tim Hightower	Kevin Pamphile
2017	LaRoy Reynolds	Graham Gano	Michael Mauti	William Gholston
2018	Jack Crawford	Julius Peppers	Jermon Bushrod	Lavonte David
2019	Ricardo Allen	Shaq Thompson	Sheldon Rankins	Demar Dotson
2020	Steven Means	Brian Burns	Terron Armstead	Ali Marpet
2021	Brandon Copeland	Jeremy Chinn	Kwon Alexander	O. J. Howard
2022	Isaiah Oliver	Jaycee Horn	Jameis Winston	Chris Godwin
2023	Kyle Pitts	Donte Jackson	Foster Moreau	Shaquil Barrett
2024	Grady Jarrett	Austin Corbett	Nephi Sewell	Mike Evans

=== NFC West ===
Ed Block Courage Award Recipient History – NFC West
Year	Arizona Cardinals	Los Angeles Rams (St. Louis Rams)	San Francisco 49ers	Seattle Seahawks
1984	Terry Stieve	Jack Youngblood	Ronnie Lott	Pete Metzelaars
1985	Stump Mitchell	Mike Guman	Keena Turner	Curt Warner
1986	Pat Tilley	Doug Smith	Joe Montana	Mike Tice
1987	Curtis Green	Charles White	Mike Wilson	Blair Bush
1988	Neil Lomax	Vince Newsome	Eric Wright	Bruce Scholtz
1989	Joe Bostic	Mark Jerue	Chet Brooks	Dave Krieg
1990	Ken Harvey	Jerry Gray	Mike Sherrard	Tommy Kane
1991	Marcus Turner	Michael Stewart	David Waymer	Joe Nash
1992	Anthony Edwards	Jackie Slater	Eric Davis	Terry Wooden
1993	Ronald Moore	David Lange	Don Griffin	Eugene Robinson
1994	Derek Ware	Roman Phifer	Harris Barton	Rufus Porter
1995	Garrison Hearst	Ron Wolfley	Dennis Brown	Brian Blades
1996	Ernest Dye	Alexander Wright	William Floyd	Steve Broussard
1997	Lomas Brown	Mark Rypien	Jesse Sapolu	Howard Ballard
1998	Mike Devlin	Mike Jones	Jerry Rice	Cortez Kennedy
1999	Lester Holmes	Ernie Conwell	Bryant Young	Brian Habib
2000	Chris Gedney	Trent Green	Garrison Hearst	Matt LaBounty
2001	Mike Gruttadauria	Isaac Bruce	Lance Shulters	Mack Strong
2002	Kyle Vanden Bosch	Andy McCollum	Tony Parrish	Floyd Womack
2003	Raleigh Roundtree	Aeneas Williams	Jeremy Newberry	Trent Dilfer
2004	Anquan Boldin	Marshall Faulk	Jamie Winborn	Chad Brown
2005	Marcel Shipp	Leonard Little	Jeremy Newberry	Bobby Engram
2006	Kurt Warner	Pisa Tinoisamoa	Frank Gore	Ken Hamlin
2007	Bertrand Berry	Dane Looker	Eric Heitmann	Seneca Wallace
2008	Gabe Watson	Orlando Pace	Manny Lawson	Chris Gray
2009	Kenny Iwebema	James Hall	Shawntae Spencer	Nate Burelson
2010	Matt Ware	Bradley Fletcher	Justin Smith	Leon Washington
2011	Early Doucet	Brit Miller	Alex Smith	Red Bryant
2012	Kerry Rhodes	Danny Amendola	Kyle Williams	James Carpenter
2013	Rashad Johnson	Lance Kendricks	Jonathan Goodwin	Chris Clemons
2014	Tyrann Mathieu	Scott Wells	Kassim Osgood	Russell Okung
2015	Chris Johnson	Brian Quick	NaVorro Bowman	Jesse Williams
2016	Patrick Peterson	Alec Ogletree	Glenn Dorsey	Cliff Avril
2017	Jaron Brown	Darrell Williams	Marquise Goodwin	Earl Thomas
2018	Markus Golden	Sam Shields	Richard Sherman	Frank Clark
2019	D. J. Foster	Cooper Kupp	Solomon Thomas	Will Dissly
2020	Dennis Gardeck	Rob Havenstein	Jason Verrett	Chris Carson
2021	Corey Peters	Justin Lawler	Dontae Johnson	Bryan Mone
2022	Maxx Williams	Jordan Fuller	Mike McGlinchey	Quandre Diggs
2023	Kyler Murray	Joe Noteboom	Javon Kinlaw	Jamal Adams
2024	L.J. Collier	Tyler Higbee	Ricky Pearsall	Abraham Lucas

=== Athletic trainers ===
Ed Block was the head athletic trainer for the Baltimore Colts for over 20 years. In addition to honoring a player from each team, the award also honors the training staff for one NFL team as voted on by the Professional Football Athletic Trainers Society (PFATS).

Ed Block Courage Award – Training Staff Winners
Year	Team	Trainers
1985	New York Jets	Bob Reese, Pepper Burruss, Joe Patton
1986	New Orleans Saints	Dean Kleinschmidt, Kevin Mangum
1987	Denver Brincos	Steve Antonopulos, Jim Gillen
1988	Seattle Seahawks	Jim Whitesel, John Kasik
1989	Cleveland Browns	Bill Tessendorf, Ron Medlin, Nark Smith, Leo Murphy
1990	Indianapolis Colts	Hunter Smith, Dave Hammer
1991	Kansas City Chiefs	Dave Kendall, Bud Epps
1992	Green Bay Packers	Domenic Gentile, Kurt Fielding
1993	Arizona Cardinals	John Omohundro, Jim Shearer, Jeff Herndon
1994	Oakland Raiders	George Anderson, Rod Martin, Jonathan Jones
1995	Washington Redskins	Lamar "Bubba" Tyer, Al Bellamy, Kevin Bastin
1996	Minnesota Vikings	Fred Zamberletti, Chuck Barta
1997	New England Patriots	Ron O'Neil, Kurt Brummels
1998	Detroit Lions	Kent Falb, Joe Recknagel, Bill Ford, Mike Hopper
1999	New York Giants	Ronnie Barnes, Steve Kennelly, Byron Hansen
2000	Tennessee Titans	Brad Brown, Don Moseley, Geoff Kaplan
2001	San Francisco 49ers	Lindsy McLean, Todd Lazenby, Jeff Tanaka
2002	Dallas Cowboys	Jim Maurer, Britt Brown, Greg Gaithers
2003	Jacksonville Jaguars	Michael Ryan, John Burrell, Joseph Sheehan
2004	Carolina Panthers	Ryan Vermillion, Mark Shermansky, Reggie Scott
2005	New Orleans Saints	Scottie Patton, Kevin Magnum, Duane Brooks
2006	Miami Dolphins	Kevin O'Neil, Troy Mauer, Ben Westby
2007	Buffalo Bills	Bud Carpenter, Greg McMillen, Chris Fischetti, Shone Gipson
2008	Pittsburgh Steelers	John Norwig, Ryan Grove, Ariko Iso
2009	San Diego Chargers	James Collins Jr., Damon Mitchell, Will Rogers
2010	Philadelphia Eagles	Rick Burkholder, Chris Peduzzi, Steve Condon, Joe O'Pella
2011	Green Bay Packers	Pepper Burruss, Kurt Fielding, Bryan Engel, Nate Weir
2012	Tampa Bay Buccaneers	todd Toriscelli, Shannon Merrick, John Ames
2013	Houston Texans	Geoff Kaplan, Ronald Ramirez, AJ Van Valkenburgh
2014	Buffalo Bills	Bud Carpenter, Greg McMillen, Chris Fischetti, Shone Gipson
2015	St. Louis Rams	Reggie Scott, James Lomax, Byron Cunningham, Tyler Williams
2016	New England Patriots	Jim Whalen, Joe Van Allen, Daryl Nelson, Michael Akinbola
2017	Minnesota Vikings	Eric Sugarman, Tom Hunkele, Rob Roche, Albert Padilla, Dave Jantzi
2018	Washington Redskins	Larry Hess, Elliott Jermyn, Doug Quon, Mark McCracken
2019	Cleveland Browns	Joe Sheehan, Gordon Williams, Shone Gipson, Patrick Rock, Stefan Varner
2020	Dallas Cowboys	Jim Maurer, Britt Brown, Greg Gaither, Hanson Yang
2021	Miami Dolphins	Kyle Johnston, Troy Maurer, Jon Boone, Naohisa Inoue, Jasmin Grimes
2022	New York Giants	Ronnie Barnes, Leigh Weiss, Mike Baum, Steve Kennelly, Justin Maher, Phil Buzzerio
