= Matt Moran (American football) =

American football player (born 1962)

Profile
- Position: Offensive Guard

Personal information
- Born: May 14, 1962 (age 64); Washington, D.C., U.S.
- Listed height: 6 ft 4 in (1.93 m)
- Listed weight: 270 lb (122 kg)

Career information
- High school: Servite (Anaheim, California)
- College: Stanford
- NFL draft: 1985: 6th round, 157th overall pick

Career history
- Dallas Cowboys (1985)*; Washington Redskins (1986)*; Kansas City Chiefs (1986)
- * Offseason or practice squad member only

Matthew R. Moran (born May 14, 1962) is an American former professional football offensive tackle in the National Football League (NFL) for the Kansas City Chiefs. He played college football at the Stanford University.

== Early life ==
Moran attended Servite High School, where he was a starter at offensive tackle. He accepted a football scholarship from Stanford University. As a freshman, he was named the starter at left tackle, as part of an offensive line that protected quarterback John Elway.

As a sophomore, he was moved to left guard. He started 43 out of 44 games in his college career, finishing with a streak of 35 starts.

== Professional career ==
Moran was selected by the Dallas Cowboys in the 6th round (157th overall) of the 1985 NFL draft. He also was selected by the Oakland Invaders in the 1985 USFL Territorial Draft. He was waived in September.

In 1986, he was signed as a free agent by the Washington Redskins. He was released on August 26.

On October 7, 1986, he was signed as a free agent by the Kansas City Chiefs to play offensive tackle. He was on the active roster for 2 games until his release on October 21.

== Personal life ==
In 2000, he was hired as an assistant football coach at Sacred Heart Preparatory, where he has worked for over 15 years.
