= Daren Gilbert =

American football player (1963–2022)

No. 77
- Position: Offensive tackle

Personal information
- Born: October 3, 1963; San Diego, California, U.S.
- Died: August 4, 2022 (aged 58)
- Listed height: 6 ft 6 in (1.98 m)
- Listed weight: 285 lb (129 kg)

Career information
- High school: Dominguez (Compton, California)
- College: Cal State Fullerton
- NFL draft: 1985: 2nd round, 38th overall pick

Career history
- New Orleans Saints (1985–1988)

Career NFL statistics
- Games played: 42
- Games started: 11
- Stats at Pro Football Reference

Daren K. Gilbert (October 3, 1963 – August 4, 2022) was an American professional football player who was an offensive tackle for four seasons in the National Football League (NFL) with the New Orleans Saints. After playing college football for Cal State Fullerton, the Saints selected him in the second round (38th pick overall) of the 1985 NFL draft. During his four-year NFL career, Gilbert appeared in 42 games.

== Early life and education ==
Gilbert was born on October 3, 1963, in San Diego, California. As a youth, Gilbert played football and soccer. He played right tackle as well as left tackle in football. An injury to his left hand as a child forced him to use his right hand as well and become ambidextrous, which accounted for his ability to play on both sides of the line.

Gilbert attended Manuel Dominguez High School in Compton, and after graduating from there, enrolled at California State University, Fullerton. He was a member of their football roster in 1981, his freshman year, and became one of the two starting offensive tackles by his sophomore season. He continued as starter in his junior season and was named a second-team all-conference selection. Weighing 285 pounds and standing six feet, six inches, Gilbert was described as having "extremely quick feet" and being "very agile" for his frame, which was credited from him playing soccer when young. He was named first-team all-conference as a senior in 1984.

== Professional career ==
Gilbert was selected with the 38th overall pick of the 1985 NFL draft by the New Orleans Saints, being a second round selection. He is the highest-selected player ever to come from Cal State, Fullerton, and was the highest-drafted lineman to come from a PCAA school. He was also selected in the 1985 USFL Territorial Draft, but opted not to play in that league. In his first year with New Orleans, Gilbert played as a backup on both sides of the offensive line and appeared in all 16 games that season.

In 1986, Gilbert appeared in nine games, helping the Saints compile a record of 7–9. Following two years of developing while a backup, Gilbert saw his first time as a starter in early 1987 due to an injury to Jim Dombrowski. He started five games at left tackle that year, which was the first season the Saints compiled a winning record and made the playoffs. He was re-signed for the 1988 season, In the 1988 season, he started six of the final seven games due to injuries to other linemen. Gilbert was released with an injury settlement in 1989.

== Personal life and death ==
Gilbert's son, Jarron, played in the NFL from 2009 to 2011.

Gilbert died in August 2022, at the age of 58. He was one of at least 345 NFL players to be diagnosed after death with chronic traumatic encephalopathy (CTE), which is caused by repeated hits to the head.
