= List of NFL supplemental draft picks =

There have been 46 players selected in the National Football League (NFL)'s supplemental draft since its inception in 1977. The supplemental draft was enacted in 1977 for players who had various circumstances affect their eligibility and did not enter the main NFL draft. The only player selected in the supplemental draft to enter the Pro Football Hall of Fame was Cris Carter, who was selected in 1987 and elected to the Hall of Fame in 2013. In addition, there have been eight players selected to Pro Bowls in their careers: Bernie Kosar (drafted in 1985), Cris Carter (1987), Bobby Humphrey (1989), Rob Moore (1990), Mike Wahle (1998), Jamal Williams (1998), Ahmad Brooks (2006), and Josh Gordon (2012).

In 1984, the NFL held a supplemental draft for college seniors who had already signed with either the United States Football League or the Canadian Football League. On June 5 in New York City, the draft was completed in an attempt to head off a bidding war in its own ranks for USFL and CFL players. Three players in this draft entered the Pro Football Hall of Fame: Steve Young, Gary Zimmerman, and Reggie White.

== List ==
†	= Pro Bowler (Note: Players are identified as a Pro Bowler if they were selected for the Pro Bowl at any time in their career.)
	= Hall of Famer

Positions key
Offense	Defense	Special teams
QB — Quarterback; RB — Running back; FB — Fullback; WR — Wide receiver; TE — Tight end; OL — Offensive lineman; T — Tackle; G — Guard; C — Center	DL — Defensive lineman; DT — Defensive tackle (Note: Includes nose tackle (NT)); DE — Defensive end; EDGE — Edge rusher; LB — Linebacker (Note: Includes middle linebacker (MLB/MIKE), weakside linebacker (WILL), strongside linebacker (SAM), off-ball linebacker, and outside linebacker (OLB)); DB — Defensive back; CB — Cornerback; S — Safety (Note: Includes free safety (FS) and strong safety (SS))	K — Kicker (Note: Also known as a placekicker (PK)); P — Punter; LS — Long snapper; RS — Return specialist (Note: Includes kickoff and punt returners)

List of NFL supplemental draft picks
Year	Player	Position	Round	NFL team	College	Reason
1977	Al Hunter	RB	4th	Seattle Seahawks	Notre Dame	Suspended from the team for disciplinary reasons.
1978	Johnnie Dirden	WR	10th	Houston Oilers	Sam Houston State	Dropped out of college after two years.
1978	Rod Connors	RB	12th	San Francisco 49ers	USC	Dropped out of college with eligibility remaining.
1979	Rod Stewart	RB	6th	Buffalo Bills	Kentucky	
1980	Matthew Teague	DE	7th	Atlanta Falcons	Prairie View A&M	
1980	Billy Mullins	WR	9th	San Diego Chargers	USC	Declared ineligible when it was discovered that he gained credits simultaneously from four junior colleges in the fall of 1977 in order to gain entry to USC.
1981	Dave Wilson	QB	1st	New Orleans Saints	Illinois	Declared ineligible amid questions about his high school transcript and junior college stay.
1981	Chy Davidson	WR	11th	New England Patriots	Rhode Island	
1982	Kevin Robinson	CB	9th	Detroit Lions	North Carolina A&T	
1985	Bernie Kosar†	QB	1st	Cleveland Browns	Miami (FL)	Graduated after his junior year.
1985	Roosevelt Snipes	RB	8th	San Francisco 49ers	Florida State	Academically ineligible.
1986	Charles Crawford	RB	7th	Philadelphia Eagles	Oklahoma State	Crawford missed his senior year with an injury and declared for the supplemental draft amid questions about whether his eligibility would be extended (currently, medical redshirt status would be given before the draft deadline).
1987	Brian Bosworth	LB	1st	Seattle Seahawks	Oklahoma	Bosworth had been dismissed from the Oklahoma football team following the 1986 season. Since he was a junior, he was eligible to be chosen in the 1987 draft but did not declare before the deadline and decided to wait for the supplemental draft, which he was eligible for due to his graduation from Oklahoma one year early.
1987	Dan Sileo	DT	3rd	Tampa Bay Buccaneers	Miami (FL)	Sileo was declared ineligible by the NCAA for his senior season.
1987	Cris Carter†	WR	4th	Philadelphia Eagles	Ohio State	Carter was suspended before his senior season for signing with an agent.
1988	Ryan Bethea	WR	5th	Minnesota Vikings	South Carolina	Suspended from team over drug arrests
1989	Steve Walsh	QB	1st	Dallas Cowboys	Miami (FL)	Walsh did not declare for the draft before its deadline.
1989	Timm Rosenbach	QB	1st	Phoenix Cardinals	Washington State	Rosenbach did not declare for the draft before its deadline.
1989	Bobby Humphrey†	RB	1st	Denver Broncos	Alabama	
1989	Brett Young	DB	8th	Buffalo Bills	Oregon	
1989	Mike Lowman	RB	12th	Dallas Cowboys	Coffeyville CC	
1990	Rob Moore†	WR	1st	New York Jets	Syracuse	Moore graduated from college with a year of eligibility remaining, and did not declare in time for regular draft.
1990	Willie Williams	TE	9th	Phoenix Cardinals	LSU	
1992	Dave Brown	QB	1st	New York Giants	Duke	Brown graduated from college with a year of eligibility remaining, and did not declare for the NFL until after the regular draft had been held. As of 2025, Brown is the last player taken in the first round of the supplemental draft.
1992	Darren Mickell	DE	2nd	Kansas City Chiefs	Florida	Mickell was suspended from team for senior season for undisclosed violations of team rules.
1994	Tito Wooten	CB	4th	New York Giants	Northeast Louisiana	
1994	John Davis	TE	5th	Dallas Cowboys	Emporia State	
1995	Darren Benson	DT	3rd	Dallas Cowboys	Trinity Valley CC	
1998	Mike Wahle†	OT	2nd	Green Bay Packers	Navy	Wahle was suspended for senior season by the NCAA after testing positive for steroids.
1998	Jamal Williams†	NT	2nd	San Diego Chargers	Oklahoma State	Williams was declared academically ineligible before his senior season.
1999	J'Juan Cherry	CB	4th	New England Patriots	Arizona State	
2002	Milford Brown	G	6th	Houston Texans	Florida State	He had used up his five-year competition eligibility.
2003	Tony Hollings	RB	2nd	Houston Texans	Georgia Tech	He was academically ineligible for the 2003 college season.
2005	Manuel Wright	DT	5th	Miami Dolphins	USC	Chose entering the draft over not playing college football while trying to regain his academic eligibility.
2006	Ahmad Brooks†	LB	3rd	Cincinnati Bengals	Virginia	He was dismissed from his college team.
2007	Paul Oliver	S	4th	San Diego Chargers	Georgia	He left college because of academic problems.
2007	Jared Gaither	OT	5th	Baltimore Ravens	Maryland	He was declared academically ineligible in college.
2009	Jeremy Jarmon	DE	3rd	Washington Redskins	Kentucky	Suspended over failed drug test.
2010	Harvey Unga	FB	7th	Chicago Bears	BYU	Expelled for disciplinary reasons.
2010	Josh Brent	NT	7th	Dallas Cowboys	Illinois	He was "... reportedly academically ineligible for the 2010 [college] season."
2011	Terrelle Pryor	QB	3rd	Oakland Raiders	Ohio State	Suspended as part of NCAA investigation into improper benefits.
2012	Josh Gordon†	WR	2nd	Cleveland Browns	Baylor	Dismissed for failed marijuana test.
2015	Isaiah Battle	OT	5th	St. Louis Rams	Clemson	Had family and off-field issues to address.
2018	Sam Beal	CB	3rd	New York Giants	Western Michigan	He was declared academically ineligible in college.
2018	Adonis Alexander	CB	6th	Washington Redskins	Virginia Tech	He was declared academically ineligible in college.
2019	Jalen Thompson	S	5th	Arizona Cardinals	Washington State	Declared ineligible for his senior season after an NCAA rules violation. Last player to be picked in the supplemental draft as of 2026.
