= Buzz Sawyer (American football) =

American football player (born 1962)

No. 8
- Position: Punter

Personal information
- Born: November 18, 1962 (age 64); Waxahachie, Texas, U.S.
- Listed height: 6 ft 1 in (1.85 m)
- Listed weight: 201 lb (91 kg)

Career information
- High school: Waxahachie
- College: Baylor
- NFL draft: 1986: undrafted

Career history
- Atlanta Falcons (1986)*; Dallas Cowboys (1987)
- * Offseason or practice squad member only

Awards and highlights
- All-SWC (1984)

Career NFL statistics
- Games played: 3
- Stats at Pro Football Reference

Robert Meade "Buzz" Sawyer (born November 18, 1962) is an American former professional football player who was a punter in the National Football League (NFL) for the Dallas Cowboys. He played college football for the Baylor Bears.

== Early life ==
Sawyer attended Waxahachie High School. He accepted a football scholarship from Baylor University. He became a starter at punter as a sophomore, posting 45 punts for 1,178 yards (26.2-yard avg.).

As a junior, Sawyer tallied 73 punts for 3,275 yards, a 44.9-yard average (school record and led the conference) and seven punts of 60-plus yards (school record).

As a senior, he registered 52 punts for 2,332 yards (44.8-yard avg.). At the time, he held the school career record for punting average (43.4) and the school's top two punting seasons.

== Professional career ==
=== Atlanta Falcons ===
Although he was selected by the San Antonio Gunslingers in the 1985 USFL Territorial Draft, Sawyer opted to sign as an undrafted free agent by the Atlanta Falcons after the 1986 NFL draft. He was waived on August 31.

=== Dallas Cowboys ===
In 1987, Sawyer signed as a free agent with the Dallas Cowboys. He was waived on August 31.

After the NFLPA strike was declared on the third week of the season, those contests were canceled (reducing the 16 game season to 15) and the NFL decided that the games would be played with replacement players. In September, he was re-signed in September to be a part of the Dallas replacement team that was given the mock name "Rhinestone Cowboys" by the media. He struggled in the game against the Washington Redskins, making 5 punts for 173 yards and a 34.6-yard average. He started 3 contests at punter, making 16 punts for 639 yards, with a long of 54 yards and a 39.9-yard average. He was released on October 20, at the end of the strike.

== Golf career ==
After his retirement from football, Sawyer took up golf around the Houston area, playing in many local tournaments. On weekends, Sawyer, or Buzz as his golfing buddies like to call him, can be frequently found playing a game of Wolf Hammer.

Date	Course	Results
2/18/2022	Cypresswood Traditions	Push
6/11/2022	Golf Club of Houston	Won $18
