= Cedrick Brown =

American football player (born 1964)

No. 23
- Position: Cornerback

Personal information
- Born: September 6, 1964 (age 62); Compton, California, U.S.
- Listed height: 5 ft 10 in (1.78 m)
- Listed weight: 178–182 lb (81–83 kg)

Career information
- High school: Compton (CA)
- College: Washington State (1982–1985)
- NFL draft: 1986: undrafted

Career history
- Philadelphia Eagles (1986–1988)

Career NFL statistics
- Games played: 12
- Interceptions: 1
- Sacks: 1.0
- Stats at Pro Football Reference

Cedrick David Brown (born September 6, 1964) is an American pastor and former football cornerback who played one season in the National Football League (NFL) for the Philadelphia Eagles. He played college football at Washington State and was signed by the Eagles as an undrafted free agent in 1986. He appeared in 12 games during the 1987 season.

== Early life and education ==
Brown was born on September 6, 1964, in Compton, California, and grew up there. He was the son of a Baptist minister and was one of eight children. He attended Compton High School and was rated the state's top prep cornerback as a senior in 1981. Brown accepted a scholarship offer from Washington State University (WSU) in 1982. He was a four-year letterman and for three years was a starter at defensive back, finishing his stint at the school with 166 tackles and three interceptions. He majored in hotel and restaurant management at WSU and graduated in 1986.

== Professional career ==
After going unselected in the NFL draft, Brown was signed by the Philadelphia Eagles as an undrafted free agent in May 1986. He was placed on injured reserve on August 20, with a sore hamstring. He was eligible to come off the list and join the active roster in November, but a team rules violation led coach Buddy Ryan to have Brown remain on the list for the rest of the season. In 1987, he received a spot on the final roster as a backup cornerback, and made his NFL debut in week one against the Washington Redskins. Brown went on to play in 12 games during the season, only missing three during the players' strike. He recorded one interception return for nine yards, one sack, one punt return for –1 yard and one kick return for 13 yards, as the Eagles compiled a record of 7–8, missing the playoffs. In 1988, Brown battled Izel Jenkins for a spot on the final roster, with Jenkins winning.

== Later life ==
After being released by the Eagles, Brown had a brief stint with Hyatt and Marriott Corporation. Afterwards, he served 15 years with Alcoa, being in sales and executive sales management and managing 33 states and over $500,000,000 in sales. Brown went into deep prayer after his time in professional football, and was a founder of Commitment Community Church in New Jersey in 1996. He quit his job at Alcoa in 2006 to become their full-time lead pastor, and has served there since. He has published several books (listed below). Brown is married and has three children.

== Works ==
- Influencing Your World. Salem Author Services. August 2005. ISBN 9781597813549.
- The Racial and Cultural Divide: Are We Still Prejudiced?. Tate Publishing & Enterprises. September 2009. ISBN 9781606046104.
- My Daily Business: Daily Nuggets for Getting Results. Xlibris. September 2013. ISBN 9781493100507.
- Act Like a Man – Woman, Can You Help Me?. Xlibris. October 2013. ISBN 9781483689562.
- He Loves Me!. Xlibris. March 2015. ISBN 9781503548930.
- Man, You Got This!. Lulu.com. September 2016. ISBN 9781365254222.
- First Chair. Vol. 1. Lulu.com. August 2020. ISBN 9781716798795.
- (with Colon, Norberto; Davis, Gerard) Primary Worship Devotional. Vol. 1. Lulu.com. January 2021. ISBN 9781716229596.
- Pause With The Good Shepherd: A Prayer and Reflection Guide. Lulu.com. February 2021. ISBN 9781716089428.
- (with Ott, Josh) Church Vitality 21 Day Devotional & Reflection Guide. Lulu.com. October 2021. ISBN 9781365972324.
