= Bob Frasco =

Profile
- Position: Quarterback

Personal information
- Born: October 22, 1961 (age 65); Orange, California, U.S.
- Listed height: 6 ft 1 in (1.85 m)
- Listed weight: 205 lb (93 kg)

Career information
- High school: El Modena (Orange, CA)
- College: Santa Ana JC (1981): San Jose State (1982–1984)
- NFL draft: 1985: undrafted

Career history
- Los Angeles Raiders (1985)*; Los Angeles Rams (1987)*
- * Offseason or practice squad member only

Bob Frasco (born c. 1963) is a former American football quarterback. He played college football for Santa Ana Junior College in 1981 and the San Jose State Spartans from 1982 to 1984. As a senior in 1984, he ranked among the leading quarterbacks in major-college football with 485 total plays (3rd), 485 total plays (3rd), 20 passing touchdowns (6th), 387 pass attempts (7th), 2,806 total yards (8th), 2,688 passing yards (9th), 221 pass completions (9th), and 244.4 yards gained per game played (9th). He was signed and released by the Los Angeles Raiders in 1985 and the Los Angeles Rams in 1987.
