= Mike Quick =

American football player (born 1959)

No. 82
- Position: Wide receiver

Personal information
- Born: May 14, 1959 (age 67); Hamlet, North Carolina, U.S.
- Listed height: 6 ft 2 in (1.88 m)
- Listed weight: 190 lb (86 kg)

Career information
- High school: Richmond (Rockingham, North Carolina)
- College: NC State
- NFL draft: 1982: 1st round, 20th overall pick

Career history
- Philadelphia Eagles (1982–1990)

Awards and highlights
- 3× First-team All-Pro (1983, 1985, 1987); 5× Pro Bowl (1983–1987); NFL receiving yards leader (1983); Philadelphia Eagles Hall of Fame; NFL record: Longest receiving touchdown: 99 yards (tied)

Career NFL statistics
- Receptions: 363
- Receiving yards: 6,464
- Receiving touchdowns: 61
- Stats at Pro Football Reference

Michael Anthony Quick (born May 14, 1959) is an American color commentator and former professional football player. He played as a wide receiver in the National Football League (NFL) with the Philadelphia Eagles for nine seasons, from 1982 to 1990. Quick played college football for the NC State Wolfpack.

== Early life ==
Quick's family initially lived in North Yard, an unincorporated section of Richmond County, North Carolina, before moving to a public housing project on the south side of Hamlet. He played football, basketball, and ran track at Richmond Senior High School in Rockingham, North Carolina.

In football, Quick helped Richmond win the 1978 state championship, and in track, he was a member of the 4x100 relay team's state championship squad. In basketball, he was Richmond's leading scorer as a senior. Quick was inducted into the inaugural class of the Raider Athletic Hall of Fame in 2023.

== Playing career ==
A surprise first-round pick by the Eagles in the 1982 NFL draft, Quick developed into a five-time Pro Bowler, selected consecutively from 1983 to 1987. He led the NFL in receiving yards in 1983 with 1,409 and finished second in 1985 with a total of 1,247. On November 10, 1985, Mike Quick caught a 99-yard touchdown pass from Ron Jaworski in overtime (an Eagles team record, and tied with twelve other QB-WR combos as an NFL record), as the Eagles beat the Atlanta Falcons in the game. He retired because of severe patella tendinitis.

== NFL career statistics ==
=== Regular season ===
| Year | Team | Games | | Receiving | | | | |
| Year | Team | GP | GS | Rec | Yds | Avg | Lng | TD |
|---|---|---|---|---|---|---|---|---|
| 1982 | PHI | 9 | 0 | 10 | 156 | 15.6 | 49 | 1 |
| 1983 | PHI | 16 | 16 | 69 | 1,409 | 20.4 | 83 | 13 |
| 1984 | PHI | 14 | 14 | 61 | 1,052 | 17.2 | 90 | 9 |
| 1985 | PHI | 16 | 15 | 73 | 1,247 | 17.1 | 99 | 11 |
| 1986 | PHI | 16 | 16 | 60 | 939 | 15.7 | 75 | 9 |
| 1987 | PHI | 12 | 12 | 46 | 790 | 17.2 | 61 | 11 |
| 1988 | PHI | 8 | 8 | 22 | 508 | 23.1 | 55 | 4 |
| 1989 | PHI | 6 | 5 | 13 | 228 | 17.5 | 40 | 2 |
| 1990 | PHI | 4 | 4 | 9 | 135 | 15.0 | 39 | 1 |
| Career | | 101 | 90 | 363 | 6,464 | 17.8 | 99 | 61 |

== Later career ==
Quick is currently a color commentator for Philadelphia Eagles radio broadcasts on WIP-FM 94.1 along with Merrill Reese, a position Quick has held since 1998. He resides in Marlton, New Jersey.

Quick appears as Coach Ike Fast, an assistant football coach, at fictional William Penn Academy in Jenkintown, PA, in Season 5, Episode 14, of the ABC-TV sitcom The Goldbergs. The episode originally aired on February 28, 2018, in honor of the Philadelphia Eagles' Super Bowl LII 41–33 win over the New England Patriots.

== Works cited ==
- Simon, Bryant (2020). The Hamlet Fire: A Tragic Story of Cheap Food, Cheap Government, and Cheap Lives. Chapel Hill: The University of North Carolina Press. ISBN 9781469661377.
