= Vic Bellamy =

American football player (born 1963)

No. 39
- Position: Defensive back

Personal information
- Born: June 2, 1963 (age 63); Philadelphia, Pennsylvania, U.S.
- Listed height: 6 ft 1 in (1.85 m)
- Listed weight: 195 lb (88 kg)

Career information
- High school: Central (Philadelphia)
- College: Syracuse (1981–1984)
- NFL draft: 1985: undrafted

Career history
- Philadelphia Eagles (1987)
- Stats at Pro Football Reference

Victor K. Bellamy (born June 2, 1963) is an American former professional football defensive back who played one season with the Philadelphia Eagles of the National Football League (NFL). He played college football at Syracuse University.

== Early life and college ==
Victor K. Bellamy was born on June 2, 1963, in Philadelphia, Pennsylvania. He attended Central High School in Philadelphia.

Bellamy was a member of the Syracuse Orange of Syracuse University from 1981 to 1984 and a three-year letterman from 1982 to 1984.

== Professional career ==
Bellamy went undrafted in the 1985 NFL draft. He was selected by the New Jersey Generals of the United States Football League (USFL) in the 1985 USFL territorial draft. However, he did not sign with the Generals for the spring 1985 season, instead opting to finish his business administration degree at Syracuse. Bellamy then spent time working at an insurance company and playing for the semi-pro Philadelphia Roughriders.

Bellamy signed with the Philadelphia Eagles on August 3, 1987. He was released on September 6, 1987. On September 23, he re-signed with the Eagles during the 1987 NFL players strike. Bellamy started all three strike games for the Eagles before being released on October 19, 1987, after the strike ended.
