= Jody Schulz =

American football player (born 1960)

No. 53, 95
- Position: Linebacker

Personal information
- Born: August 17, 1960 (age 66); Easton, Maryland, U.S.
- Listed height: 6 ft 3 in (1.91 m)
- Listed weight: 235 lb (107 kg)

Career information
- High school: Queen Anne's County (Centreville, Maryland)
- College: Chowan JC; East Carolina
- NFL draft: 1983: 2nd round, 46th overall pick

Career history
- Philadelphia Eagles (1983–1987)

Awards and highlights
- Third-team All-American (1982); East Carolina Athletics Hall of Fame (1999); Chowan University Athletics Hall of Fame (1992)

Career NFL statistics
- Sacks: 1.5
- Interceptions: 1
- Stats at Pro Football Reference

Jody John Schulz (born August 17, 1960) is an American former professional football player who was a linebacker for five seasons with the Philadelphia Eagles of the National Football League (NFL) from 1983 to 1987. He was selected by the Eagles in the second round of the 1983 NFL draft. He played college football at Chowan JC and East Carolina.

== Early life ==
Schulz attended Queen Anne's County High School in Centreville, Maryland. He played football, but his team was "terrible" and did not win many games. He did not try hard in school and dropped out for one year and thought about getting married until the woman he was going to marry was killed in a car crash. Schulz got arrested while out of school, and the judge at a court hearing told him to either go back to school, or go to jail.

== College career ==
=== Chowan University ===
Schulz attended Chowan University to play college football, but when he first arrived, he was ninth on the depth chart at defensive end. Because so many players tried out for the team, Schulz did not receive a helmet until other players quit the team. In his first season, Schulz won more games than he had his entire high school career.

He was inducted into the Chowan University Athletics Hall of Fame in 1992.

=== East Carolina University ===
Chowan University played against the East Carolina Pirates junior varsity football team, and an assistant coach for the Pirates, Gary Fast, recruited Schulz and about eight or nine other players to East Carolina to play for head coach Ed Emory. Schulz was also recruited by other schools such as Wake Forest, Maryland, Virginia Tech and Tulane. Schulz was favoring going to Wake Forest because he liked their linebackers coach, and told Fast that he was thinking about going there to play football. That day, Fast came to Schulz's door and tried to talk him into coming to East Carolina. Fast came back the following day and the day after that in hopes of convincing Schulz to sign a letter-of-intent to East Carolina. Fast explained to Schulz that coach Emory told Fast not to come back to East Carolina if he could not get Schulz to sign a letter-of-intent. When Fast could still not convince Schulz, he called Emory, and, during a snowstorm, flew in to Kent Island, Maryland, where Schulz lived. As soon as Schulz saw Emory get off the airplane, he signed the letter-of-intent immediately.

In 1981, with Schulz leading the defense, Emory recorded his first winning season as head coach. Schulz led the team in tackles in 1981 with 125 tackles. He also had nine sacks. He earned honorable mention All-America honors by the Associated Press.

In 1982, Schulz made 105 tackles and 10 sacks and earned Associated Press All-America honors. After the season, he tried to get a redshirt out of his freshman year at Chowan in order to play for the Pirates in 1983, but could not get it since he played too much his freshman year.

Schulz played in the Blue–Gray Football Classic on December 25, 1982.

Schulz was inducted into the East Carolina Athletics Hall of Fame in 1999.

== Professional career ==
The Green Bay Packers told Schulz that they were going to draft him in the 1983 NFL draft. However, he was selected by the Philadelphia Eagles in the second round (46th overall), one pick before the Packers would pick. He became the highest draft pick ever to come out of East Carolina until Robert Jones was selected in the first round (24th overall) of the 1991 NFL draft. He was also drafted in the 14th round of the 1983 USFL draft by the Washington Federals, but he chose to sign with the Eagles. He signed a series of one-year contracts with the Eagles on May 24, 1983. He quickly became the starter at left outside linebacker for the team, and in his NFL debut, a game against the Packers, Schulz made two sacks and had more than 10 tackles. A few weeks later, against the Denver Broncos, Schulz injured his knee, his first injury since before college. He subsequently injured it many times during the season. A more serious knee injury caused him to miss the entire 1985 season. He received the Ed Block Courage Award in 1986 after he came back from the injury. Schulz was released on April 27, 1988 and subsequently retired thereafter.

== After football ==
Schulz runs his family's 2 seafood restaurant's with his parents, the Fisherman's Inn and Crab Deck (fishermansinn.com) which burned down in 1980 and has since been rebuilt. Schulz purchased the Salts Pond Marina Resort located in Hampton, Virginia (VA), right off the Chesapeake Bay. Schulz also is a land developer and manages several commercial properties. He is currently the President of the Kent Island Volunteer Fire Department.

== Personal ==
Schulz is married to his wife, Sherri, and they have four sons: Dusty, Kirby, Kolby and Dorsey. They live on their 123-acre waterfront farm in Chester Maryland where they are avid deer and waterfowl hunters.
