= Elbert Foules =

American football player (born 1961)

No. 29
- Position: Cornerback

Personal information
- Born: July 4, 1961 (age 65); Greenville, Mississippi, U.S.
- Listed height: 5 ft 11 in (1.80 m)
- Listed weight: 185 lb (84 kg)

Career information
- High school: Greenville Weston
- College: Alcorn State
- NFL draft: 1983: undrafted

Career history
- Philadelphia Eagles (1983–1987); Houston Oilers (1988)*
- * Offseason or practice squad member only

Career NFL statistics
- Interceptions: 10
- Fumble recoveries: 3
- Stats at Pro Football Reference

Elbert E. Foules Jr. (born July 4, 1961) is an American former professional football player who was a cornerback for five seasons for the Philadelphia Eagles in the National Football League (NFL). Foules played college football for the Alcorn State Braves and was inducted to the Alcorn State University Sports Hall of Fame in November 2013.
