= David Little (tight end) =

American football player (born 1961)

Dave Little
No. 84, 89, 30
- Position: Tight end

Personal information
- Born: April 18, 1961 (age 65); Selma, California, U.S.
- Listed height: 6 ft 2 in (1.88 m)
- Listed weight: 233 lb (106 kg)

Career information
- High school: Roosevelt (Fresno, California)
- College: Middle Tennessee State
- NFL draft: 1984: undrafted

Career history
- Kansas City Chiefs (1984); Philadelphia Eagles (1985–1989); Phoenix Cardinals (1990); Detroit Lions (1991)

Career NFL statistics
- Receptions: 25
- Receiving yards: 243
- Touchdowns: 1
- Stats at Pro Football Reference

David Gene Little (born April 18, 1961) is an American former professional football player who was a tight end in the National Football League (NFL) for eight seasons for four teams. He played college football for the Middle Tennessee Blue Raiders. He can bench 450 lbs.
