= Michael Haddix =

American football player (born 1961)

No. 26, 35
- Position: Running back

Personal information
- Born: December 27, 1961 (age 64); Walnut, Mississippi, U.S.
- Listed height: 6 ft 2 in (1.88 m)
- Listed weight: 225 lb (102 kg)

Career information
- High school: Walnut (MS)
- College: Mississippi State (1979–1982)
- NFL draft: 1983: 1st round, 8th overall pick

Career history
- Philadelphia Eagles (1983–1988); Green Bay Packers (1989–1990)

Awards and highlights
- 2× Second-team All-SEC (1981, 1982)

Career NFL statistics
- Rushing attempts: 543
- Rushing yards: 1,635
- Rushing touchdowns: 3
- Receptions: 172
- Receiving yards: 1,310
- Receiving touchdowns: 3
- Stats at Pro Football Reference

Michael McGlamery Haddix (born December 27, 1961) is an American former professional football player who was a running back for eight seasons in the National Football League (NFL) for the Philadelphia Eagles and Green Bay Packers. He played college football for the Mississippi State Bulldogs. Philadelphia selected Haddix eighth overall in the first round of the 1983 NFL draft, primarily due to his 4.5 speed. Haddix played eight seasons in the NFL and holds the dubious distinction of having averaged the fewest average yards per carry (3.0) for a player with more than 500 carries in the NFL. He was inducted to the Mississippi State Hall of Fame in 2019.

== Michael Haddix, Jr. ==
Haddix's son, Michael Haddix Jr. is a former NCAA basketball player for the Siena College Saints. In 2007, he received NFL tryouts from the Buffalo Bills and New York Jets.
