= Reggie Singletary =

American football player (born 1964)

No. 97, 68
- Positions: Defensive tackle, guard, offensive tackle

Personal information
- Born: January 17, 1964 (age 62); Whiteville, North Carolina, U.S.
- Listed height: 6 ft 3 in (1.91 m)
- Listed weight: 279 lb (127 kg)

Career information
- High school: West Columbus (Cerro Gordo, North Carolina)
- College: NC State
- NFL draft: 1986: 12th round, 315th overall pick

Career history
- Philadelphia Eagles (1986–1990); Green Bay Packers (1991)

Awards and highlights
- PFWA All-Rookie Team (1986)

Career NFL statistics
- Games played - started: 61 - 31
- Sacks: 1
- Fumble recoveries: 1
- Stats at Pro Football Reference

Reggie Leslie Singletary (born January 17, 1964) is an American former professional football player who was a defensive lineman and offensive lineman for five seasons for the Philadelphia Eagles of the National Football League (NFL). He was selected by the Eagles in the 12th round of the 1986 NFL draft with 315th overall pick.
