= Charles Crawford (American football) =

American football player (born 1964)

No. 45
- Position: Running back

Personal information
- Born: March 8, 1964; Bristow, Oklahoma, U.S.
- Listed height: 6 ft 2 in (1.88 m)
- Listed weight: 235 lb (107 kg)

Career information
- College: Oklahoma State
- Supplemental draft: 1986: 7th round

Career history
- Philadelphia Eagles (1986–1987)

Career NFL statistics
- Rushing yards: 88
- Rushing average: 3.1
- Rushing touchdowns: 1
- Stats at Pro Football Reference

Charles Crawford (born March 8, 1964) is an American former professional football player who was a running back for two seasons with the Philadelphia Eagles of the National Football League (NFL) from 1986 to 1987. He played college football for the Oklahoma State Cowboys and was selected by the Eagles with a supplemental seventh round draft pick in the 1986 NFL draft.
