= Ken Reeves (American football) =

American football player (born 1961)

No. 66, 77
- Positions: Offensive tackle, guard

Personal information
- Born: October 4, 1961 (age 65); Pittsburg, Texas, U.S.
- Listed height: 6 ft 5 in (1.96 m)
- Listed weight: 270 lb (122 kg)

Career information
- High school: Pittsburg
- College: Texas A&M
- NFL draft: 1985: 6th round, 156th overall pick

Career history
- Philadelphia Eagles (1985–1989); Cleveland Browns (1990)

Career NFL statistics
- Games played: 85
- Games started: 32
- Fumble recoveries: 3
- Stats at Pro Football Reference

Kenneth Wayne Reeves (born October 4, 1961) is an American former professional football player who was an offensive tackle for six seasons in the National Football League (NFL). He was selected by the Philadelphia Eagles in the sixth round of the 1985 NFL draft after playing college football for the Texas A&M Aggies. He played for the Eagles for five seasons from 1985 to 1989 and the Cleveland Browns in 1990. He was the starting left tackle for the Eagles in 1985, and the starting left tackle and left guard for the team in 1986.

== Professional career ==
Reeves was selected in the sixth round, 156th overall, by the Philadelphia Eagles in the 1985 NFL draft. As a rookie in 1985, he started 13 games at left tackle. Reeves was a member of one of the worst offensive lines in NFL history in 1986, which gave up an NFL-record 104 sacks. He started six games at left tackle and nine games at left guard for the Eagles that season. Before the 1987 season, he was hospitalized and had to receive an emergency appendectomy, causing him to miss the first few games of the season. He played in 10 games in 1987 without recording a start, serving as the backup left tackle to Matt Darwin, who replaced him while he was recovering from surgery. In 1988, Reeves played in 15 games and started once in place of Darwin at left tackle. Before the 1989 season, he lost out to Darwin in a competition for the starting left tackle position. Reeves ended up playing in 14 games and started three in 1989.

Following training camp with the Eagles in 1990, he was traded to the Cleveland Browns on August 7, 1990, in exchange for a fourth-round pick in 1992 NFL draft (later used to select running back Tony Brooks. Reeves played in all 16 games for the Browns in 1990, serving on the point after and field goal special teams units. He was released during roster cuts on August 20, 1991, after spending training camp with the Browns.
