= Joe Conwell =

American football player (born 1961)

No. 71, 79
- Position: Offensive tackle

Personal information
- Born: February 24, 1961 (age 65); Philadelphia, Pennsylvania, U.S.
- Listed height: 6 ft 5 in (1.96 m)
- Listed weight: 280 lb (127 kg)

Career information
- High school: Lower Merion (Ardmore, Pennsylvania)
- College: North Carolina (1980–1983)
- Supplemental draft: 1984: 2nd round, 51st overall pick

Career history
- Philadelphia/Baltimore Stars (1984–1985); Philadelphia Eagles (1986–1988)
- Stats at Pro Football Reference

Joseph Stanislaus Conwell (born February 24, 1961) is an American former professional football player who was an offensive tackle for two seasons with the Philadelphia Eagles of the National Football League (NFL). He played college football for the North Carolina Tar Heels. Conwell was also a member of the Philadelphia/Baltimore Stars of the United States Football League (USFL).

== Early life and college ==
Joseph Stanislaus Conwell was born on February 24, 1961, in Philadelphia, Pennsylvania. He attended Lower Merion High School in Ardmore, Pennsylvania.

He was a member of the North Carolina Tar Heels football team from 1980 to 1983 and a three-year letterman from 1981 to 1983.

== Professional career ==
Conwell was a territorial selection of the Philadelphia Stars of the United States Football League (USFL) in 1984. He was also selected by the San Francisco 49ers in the second round, with the 51st overall pick, of the 1984 NFL supplemental draft of USFL and CFL players. He played in one game for the Stars during the 1984 USFL season. He missed the majority of the season due an ankle injury he suffered in the East–West Shrine Game after his senior year of college.

Conwell played in all 18 games for the newly renamed Baltimore Stars in 1985.

On August 20, 1986, the 49ers traded Conwell's NFL negotiation rights to the Philadelphia Eagles for a 1987 11th round draft pick. He signed with the Eagles the same day. He appeared in all 16 games, starting nine, for the Eagles in 1986. He played in 12 games, all starts, in 1987. Conwell became a free agent after the 1987 season and re-signed with the Eagles on August 16, 1988. He was placed on the physically unable to perform list on August 29, 1988. He was released on October 24, 1988.

== Personal life ==
Conwell is the brother of singer Tommy Conwell.
