= John Teltschik =

American football player (born 1964)

No. 10
- Position: Punter

Personal information
- Born: March 8, 1964 (age 62); Floresville, Texas, U.S.
- Listed height: 6 ft 2 in (1.88 m)
- Listed weight: 209 lb (95 kg)

Career information
- High school: Tivy (Kerrville, Texas)
- College: Texas
- NFL draft: 1986: 9th round, 249th overall pick

Career history
- Chicago Bears (1986)*; Philadelphia Eagles (1986–1990)
- * Offseason or practice squad member only

Awards and highlights
- NFL punting yards leader (1986); PFWA All-Rookie Team (1986); Second-team All-American (1983); First-team All-SWC (1983); Southwest Conference Champion (1983)

Career NFL statistics
- Punts: 345
- Punting yards: 13,828
- Punting average: 40.1
- Stats at Pro Football Reference

John Robert Teltschik (born March 8, 1964) is an American former professional football player who was a punter in the National Football League (NFL).

== Early life ==
Born in Floresville, Texas, Teltschik played scholastically at Tivy High School in Kerrville, Texas.

== College career ==
He played collegiately for the Texas Longhorns, where he was the starting punter for the 1983-85 seasons. As a sophomore, he was honored by United Press International as a second-team All-American, first team all-conference playing for a team that won the Southwest Conference Championship. During his four years at Texas, the team went to (and lost) four straight bowl games. He set the school record for highest punting average in a game against Texas Tech in 1984 (surpassed by Michael Dickson in 2016) during which he kicked a 73 yard punt.

== Professional career ==
=== Chicago Bears ===
Teltschik was selected by the Chicago Bears in the ninth round of the 1986 NFL draft. He was cut by the Bears late in training camp.

=== Philadelphia Eagles ===
Teltschik was immediately picked up by the Philadelphia Eagles. He spent his entire four-year career with the Eagles, leading the NFL in punts in 1986, 1987, and 1988 and punting yards in 1986.

During his rookie year, he led the league in punts with 108 - the most ever for a rookie and 3rd most in NFL history. That year he was named the NFL All Rookie team and was the Eagles special teams MVP. He led the league in punts again the next year with 82, including a single-game NFL record 15 against the New York Giants (surpassed by Leo Araguz the next year); and was again named the Eagles special teams MVP. In 1998, he co-led the league with 98 punts. During his first three seasons he had 288 punts, handled some kickoffs, held for some placekicks, and made some tackles.

In 1989, he injured his knee making a tackle. He played 7 more games before being pulled for the injury. He had 2 surgeries on his knee and it ended his career.

Teltschik returned to Texas and got into the home construction business before buying and operating a tree farm in Tioga, Texas.
