= Matt Darwin =

American football player (born 1963)

No. 78
- Positions: Center, offensive tackle

Personal information
- Born: March 11, 1963 (age 63); Houston, Texas, U.S.
- Listed height: 6 ft 4 in (1.93 m)
- Listed weight: 268 lb (122 kg)

Career information
- High school: Klein (TX)
- College: Texas A&M
- NFL draft: 1986: 4th round, 106th overall pick

Career history
- Philadelphia Eagles (1986–1990)

Awards and highlights
- PFWA All-Rookie Team (1986)

Career NFL statistics
- Games played: 61
- Games started: 52
- Fumble recoveries: 2
- Stats at Pro Football Reference

Matthew Wayne Darwin (born March 11, 1963) is an American former professional football player who was a center in the National Football League (NFL) for the Philadelphia Eagles. He was drafted twice, first in the 1985 NFL draft by the Dallas Cowboys and finally in the 1986 NFL draft by the Eagles. He played college football at Texas A&M University.

== Early life ==
Darwin attended Klein High School, where he played as a tight end. He accepted a football scholarship from Texas A&M University.

As a freshman, he was converted into an offensive tackle and became a starter. As a sophomore, he was named the starting center. As a senior, he played at center and guard, while not allowing an opponent sack.

== Professional career ==
=== Dallas Cowboys ===
Darwin was selected by the Dallas Cowboys in the fifth round (119th overall) of the 1986 NFL draft. He had contentious negotiations with the team and did not reach a contract agreement during the season.

=== Philadelphia Eagles ===
After not signing with any team during the 1985 season, he re-entered the NFL draft and was selected by the Philadelphia Eagles in the fourth round (106th overall) of the 1986 NFL draft.

After experiencing another contract holdout, he replaced an injured Gerry Feehery and started 10 games at center as a rookie. The next year, he was moved to left tackle, where he would remain as the starter for three years.

On December 21, 1989 he was placed on the injured reserve list with a left knee injury. The next year he re-injured his knee and was placed on the injured reserve list on September 30 after playing and starting in two games.

== Personal life ==
After his football career, Darwin settled down and became a scoutmaster for Troop 437 in Richardson, Texas until 2018, when he stepped down after his third youngest son became an Eagle Scout, graduated, went to college, and was married. Matt Darwin currently attends a Reformed Baptist church in Wylie, Texas.
