= Gerald Feehery =

American football player (born 1960)

No. 67, 64
- Position: Center/Guard

Personal information
- Born: March 9, 1960 (age 66); Philadelphia, Pennsylvania, U.S.
- Listed height: 6 ft 2 in (1.88 m)
- Listed weight: 268 lb (122 kg)

Career information
- High school: Cardinal O'Hara (Springfield, Pennsylvania)
- College: Syracuse
- NFL draft: 1983: undrafted

Career history
- Philadelphia Eagles (1983–1987); Kansas City Chiefs (1988); New England Patriots (1989)

Career NFL statistics
- Games played: 47
- Games started: 24
- Stats at Pro Football Reference

Gerald J. Feehery (born March 9, 1960) is an American former professional football player who was an offensive lineman in the National Football League (NFL). He attended Cardinal O'Hara High School in Springfield, Pennsylvania. He played college football for the Syracuse Orange, lettering all four years from 1979 through 1982. He was not selected in the 1983 NFL draft but was selected by the New Jersey Generals in the 1983 United States Football League Territorial Draft. Feehery would play 47 games over six seasons in the NFL as a center and guard for the Philadelphia Eagles and the Kansas City Chiefs.
