= 2014 United States House of Representatives elections in New Jersey =

- November 4, 2014

All 12 New Jersey seats to the United States House of Representatives
- Turnout: 36% (▼31pp)
	Majority party	Minority party
Party	Democratic	Republican
Last election	6	6
Seats won	6	6
Seat change	Steady	Steady
Popular vote	914,172	877,265
Percentage	50.19%	48.17%
Swing	▼4.48%	▲4.53%

Democratic
50–60%
60–70%
70–80%
80–90%
Republican
40–50%
50–60%
60–70%

The 2014 United States House of Representatives elections in New Jersey were held on Tuesday, November 4, 2014, to elect the 12 U.S. representatives from the state of New Jersey, one from each of the state's 12 congressional districts. The elections coincided with the 2014 United States midterm elections for other federal and state offices, including U.S. House elections in other states and a U.S. Senate election in New Jersey.

As of 2024, this is the last time New Jersey's delegation to the United States House of Representatives did not have a Democratic majority.

== Overview ==
United States House of Representatives elections in New Jersey, 2014
Party	Votes	Percentage	Seats	+/–
Democratic	914,172	50.19%	6	-
Republican	877,265	48.17%	6	-
Others	29,928	1.64%	0	-
Totals	1,821,365	100.00%	12	0

=== By district ===
Results of the 2014 United States House of Representatives elections in New Jersey by district:

District	Democratic		Republican		Others		Total		Result
District	Votes	%	Votes	%	Votes	%	Votes	%	Result
District 1	93,315	57.43%	64,073	39.43%	5,104	3.14%	162,492	100.0%	Democratic hold
District 2	66,026	37.97%	108,875	61.46%	2,247	1.27%	177,148	100.0%	Republican hold
District 3	82,537	44.35%	100,471	53.99%	3,095	1.66%	186,103	100.0%	Republican hold
District 4	54,415	31.12%	118,826	67.96%	4,517	2.58%	174,849	100.0%	Republican hold
District 5	81,808	43.30%	104,678	55.41%	2,435	1.29%	188,921	100.0%	Republican hold
District 6	72,190	59.93%	46,891	38.93%	1,376	1.14%	120,457	100.0%	Democratic hold
District 7	68,232	38.77%	104,287	59.25%	3,478	1.98%	175,997	100.0%	Republican hold
District 8	61,510	77.35%	15,141	19.04%	2,867	3.61%	79,518	100.0%	Democratic hold
District 9	82,498	68.49%	36,246	30.09%	1,715	1.42%	120,459	100.0%	Democratic hold
District 10	95,734	85.38%	14,154	12.62%	2,235	1.99%	112,123	100.0%	Democratic hold
District 11	65,477	37.43%	109,455	62.57%	0	0.00%	174,932	100.0%	Republican hold
District 12	90,430	60.95%	54,168	36.51%	3,768	2.54%	148,366	100.0%	Democratic hold
Total	914,172	50.19%	877,265	48.17%	29,928	1.64%	1,821,365	100.0%	

== District 1 ==
2014 New Jersey's 1st congressional district election
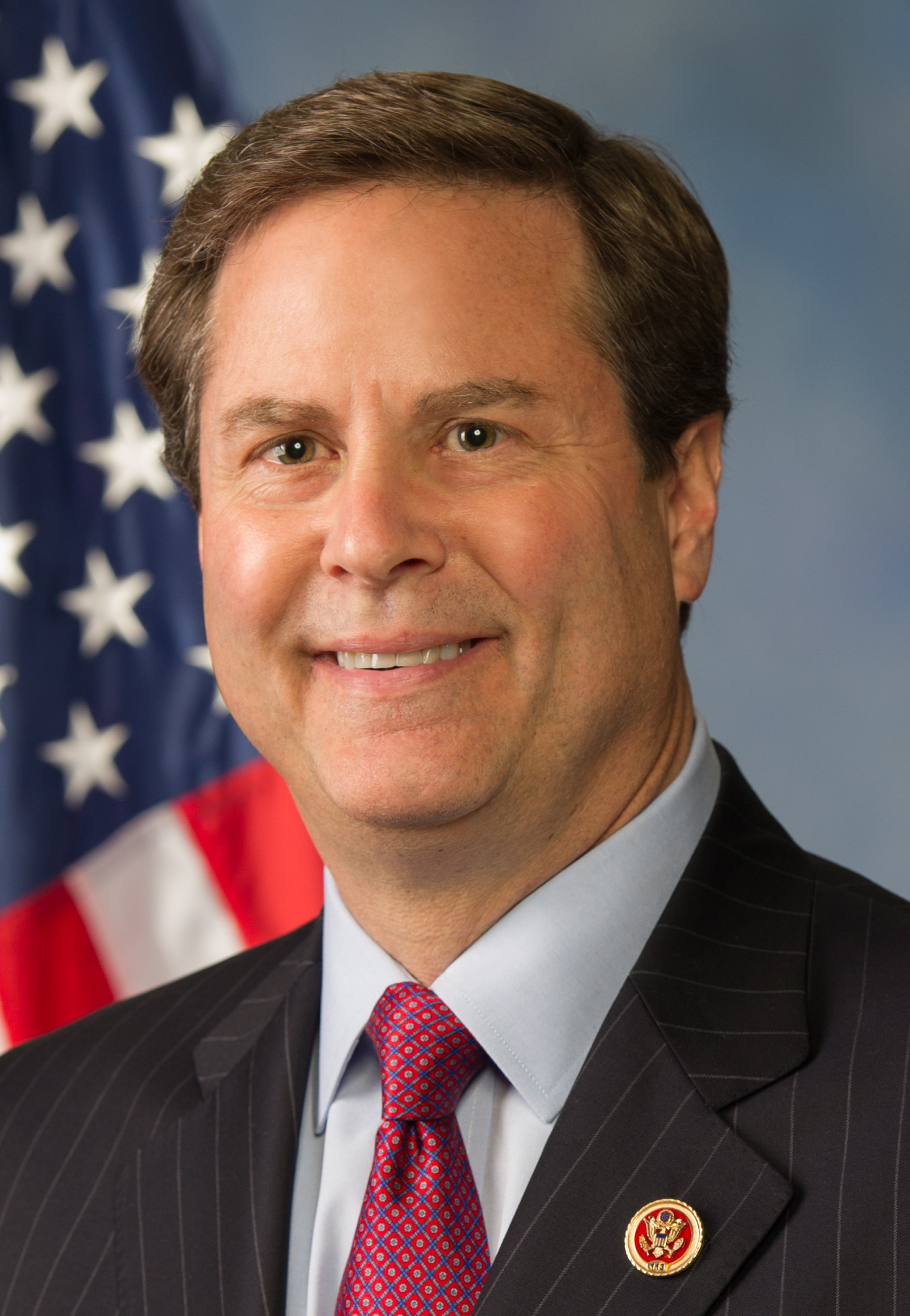

Nominee	Donald Norcross	Garry Cobb
Party	Democratic	Republican
Popular vote	93,315	64,073
Percentage	57.4%	39.4%
- Norcross: 40–50% 50–60% 60–70% 70–80% 80–90% Cobb: 40–50% 50–60% 80–90%
U.S. Representative before election
Rob Andrews
Democratic
Elected U.S. Representative
Donald Norcross
Democratic

The 1st district is based in South Jersey and includes most of Camden County along with parts of Burlington County and Gloucester County. Democrat Rob Andrews represented the district from 1990 until his resignation on February 18, 2014. New Jersey Governor Chris Christie called for a special election on November 4 (concurrent with the general election) to fill the remaining months of Andrews' term.

Radio personality and former NFL linebacker Garry Cobb and perennial candidate Lee Lucas ran in the Republican primary.

=== Democratic primary ===
Democratic state senator Donald Norcross ran to succeed Andrews. The brother of businessman and political boss George Norcross, Donald was the "heavy favorite" to win the seat. Shortly after declaring his candidacy, he had been endorsed by every Democratic member of New Jersey's congressional delegation as well as New Jersey Senate President Stephen M. Sweeney, New Jersey General Assembly Majority Leader Louis Greenwald, Camden Mayor Dana Redd and former governor Jim Florio. Matthew Harris, who had been running against Andrews, had announced that he would continue his campaign against Norcross, but quickly withdrew, citing the "cascade of endorsements" for Norcross. Logan Township Mayor Frank Minor and Marine Corps veteran Frank Broomell also ran in the Democratic primary.

==== Candidates ====
===== Nominee =====
- Donald Norcross, state senator

===== Eliminated in primary =====
- Frank Broomell, United States Marine Corps veteran
- Frank Minor, mayor of Logan Township

===== Withdrew =====
- Matthew Harris

===== Declined =====
- Rob Andrews, former U.S. representative

==== Results ====
Democratic primary results
Party	Candidate	Votes	%
Democratic	Donald Norcross	18,400	72.1
Democratic	Frank Broomell	3,848	15.1
Democratic	Frank Minor	3,276	12.8
Total votes		25,524	100.0

=== Republican primary ===
==== Candidates ====
===== Nominee =====
- Garry Cobb, radio personality and ex-NFL player

===== Eliminated in primary =====
- Claire Gustafson
- Lee Lucas, former congressional and General Assembly candidate
- Gerard McManus

Note: None of the Republican candidates filed for the special election to fill Congressman Rob Andrews' unexpired term.

==== Results ====
Republican primary results
Party	Candidate	Votes	%
Republican	Garry Cobb	6,378	68.3
Republican	Claire Gustafson	1,334	14.3
Republican	Gerard McManus	863	9.2
Republican	Lee Lucas	766	8.2
Total votes		9,341	100.0

=== General election ===
==== Endorsements ====
Donald Norcross (D)

Labor unions

- AFL-CIO
- National Association of Letter Carriers
- National Education Association

Organizations

- Human Rights Campaign

Newspapers

- The Philadelphia Inquirer
Garry Cobb (R)

Organizations

- Eagle Forum

==== Predictions ====
Source	Ranking	As of
The Cook Political Report	Safe D	November 3, 2014
Rothenberg	Safe D	October 24, 2014
Sabato's Crystal Ball	Safe D	October 30, 2014
RCP	Safe D	November 2, 2014
Daily Kos Elections	Safe D	November 4, 2014

==== Results ====
New Jersey's 1st congressional district, 2014
Party	Candidate	Votes	%
Democratic	Donald Norcross	93,315	57.4
Republican	Garry Cobb	64,073	39.4
Independent	Scot John Tomaszewski	1,784	1.1
Independent	Robert Shapiro	1,134	0.7
Independent	Margaret M. Chapman	1,103	0.7
Independent	Mike Berman	634	0.4
Independent	Donald E Letton	449	0.3
Total votes		162,492	100.0
Democratic hold			

==== By county ====
County	Donald Norcross Democratic		Garry Cobb Republican		Various candidates Other parties		Margin		Total votes cast
County	#	%	#	%	#	%	#	%	Total votes cast
Burlington (part)	3,148	57.4%	2,244	40.9%	97	1.8%	904	16.5%	5,489
Camden (part)	64,152	59.7%	39,668	36.9%	3,721	3.5%	24,484	22.8%	107,541
Gloucester (part)	26,015	52.6%	22,161	44.8%	1,286	3.1%	3,854	7.8%	49,462
Totals	93,315	57.4%	64,073	39.4%	5,104	3.1%	29,242	18.0%	162,492

=== Special election ===
New Jersey's 1st congressional district, 2014
Party	Candidate	Votes	%
Democratic	Donald Norcross	92,786	57.53%
Republican	Garry Cobb	63,727	39.51%
Independent	Scot John Tomaszewski	2,373	1.47%
Independent	Robert Shapiro	1,647	1.02%
Independent	Donald E Letton	742	0.47%
Total votes		161,275	100.00%
Democratic hold			

==== By county ====
County	Donald Norcross Democratic		Garry Cobb Republican		Various candidates Other parties		Margin		Total votes cast
County	#	%	#	%	#	%	#	%	Total votes cast
Burlington (part)	3,002	56.32%	2,225	41.74%	103	1.94%	777	14.58%	5,330
Camden (part)	65,010	59.95%	40,097	36.97%	3,339	3.08%	24,913	22.98%	108,446
Gloucester (part)	24,774	49.52%	21,405	42.78%	1,320	7.70%	3,369	6.74%	50,033
Totals	92,786	57.53%	63,727	39.51%	4,762	2.96%	29,059	18.02%	161,275

== District 2 ==
2014 New Jersey's 2nd congressional district election
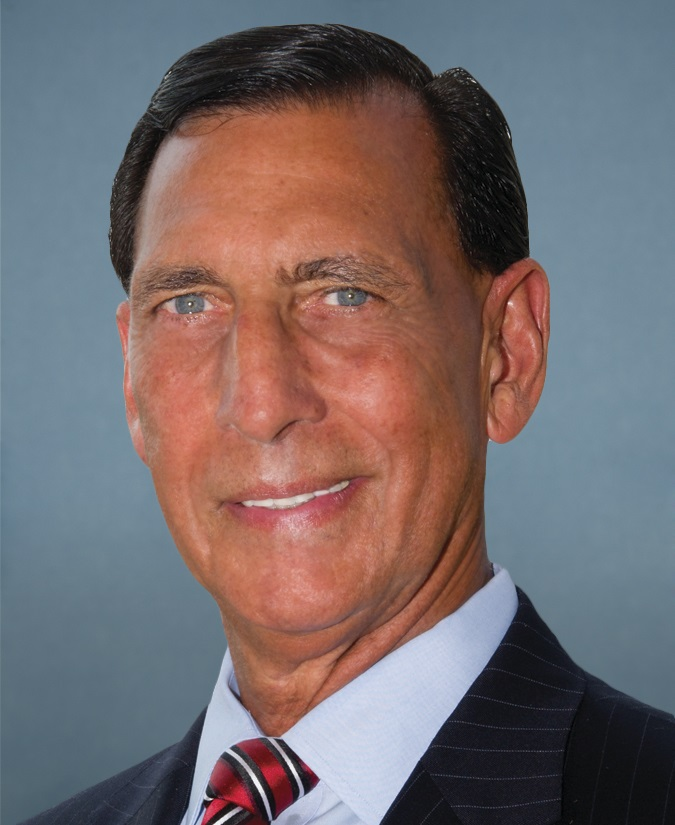

Nominee	Frank LoBiondo	Bill Hughes
Party	Republican	Democratic
Popular vote	108,875	66,026
Percentage	61.4%	37.3%
- LoBiondo: 50–60% 60–70% 70–80% Hughes: 50–60% 60–70% 70–80%
U.S. Representative before election
Frank LoBiondo
Republican
Elected U.S. Representative
Frank LoBiondo
Republican

The 2nd district is based in South Jersey and is the biggest congressional district in the state. It includes all of Atlantic, Cape May, Cumberland and Salem Counties and parts of Burlington, Camden, Gloucester, and Ocean counties.

=== Republican primary ===
==== Candidates ====
===== Nominee =====
- Frank LoBiondo, incumbent U.S. representative

===== Eliminated in primary =====
- Mike Assad, Absecon Board of Education member and candidate for this seat in 2012

==== Results ====
Republican primary results
Party	Candidate	Votes	%
Republican	Frank LoBiondo (incumbent)	13,881	82.4
Republican	Mike Assad	2,968	17.6
Total votes		16,849	100.0

=== Democratic primary ===
==== Candidates ====
===== Nominee =====
- Bill Hughes, former federal prosecutor; son of former congressman William J. Hughes

===== Eliminated in primary =====
- David Cole, former White House aide and Barack Obama campaign staffer

===== Declined =====
- Lou Greenwald, Majority Leader of the New Jersey General Assembly
- Jeff Van Drew, state senator
- Jim Whelan, state senator

==== Results ====
Democratic primary results
Party	Candidate	Votes	%
Democratic	Bill Hughes	11,074	81.7
Democratic	David Cole	2,481	18.3
Total votes		13,555	100.0

=== General election ===
==== Endorsements ====
Frank LoBiondo (R)

Statewide officials

- Chris Christie, Governor of New Jersey

Labor unions

- AFL-CIO
- Fraternal Order of Police
- International Association of Fire Fighters
- Laborers' International Union of North America
- National Association of Letter Carriers
- National Education Association

Organizations

- American Nurses Association
- Humane Society of the United States
- League of Conservation Voters
- National Association of Police Organizations
- National Federation of Independent Business
- National Rifle Association - Political Victory Fund
- National Right to Life Committee
- United States Chamber of Commerce

Newspapers

- Hammonton Gazette
- The Philadelphia Inquirer
Bill Hughes (D)

State legislators

- Stephen Sweeney, President of the New Jersey Senate

==== Polling ====
Poll source	Date(s) administered	Sample size	Margin of error	Frank LoBiondo (R)	Bill Hughes (D)	Other	Undecided
Stockton College	October 25–27, 2014	600	± 4%	56%	38%	—	4%
Monmouth University	October 12–14, 2014	638	± 4.7%	56%	35%	2%	7%
Stockton College	September 27–October 1, 2014	604	± 4%	47%	42%	—	11%

==== Predictions ====
Source	Ranking	As of
The Cook Political Report	Safe R	November 3, 2014
Rothenberg	Safe R	October 24, 2014
Sabato's Crystal Ball	Safe R	October 30, 2014
RCP	Safe R	November 2, 2014
Daily Kos Elections	Safe R	November 4, 2014

==== Results ====
New Jersey's 2nd congressional district, 2014
Party	Candidate	Votes	%
Republican	Frank LoBiondo (incumbent)	108,875	61.4
Democratic	Bill Hughes	66,026	37.3
Independent	Alexander H. Spano	663	0.4
Independent	Gary Stein	612	0.3
Independent	Costantino Rozzo	501	0.3
Independent	Bayode Olabisi	471	0.3
Total votes		177,148	100.0
Republican hold			

==== By county ====
County	Frank LoBiondo Republican		Billy Hughes Democratic		Various candidates Other parties		Margin		Total votes cast
County	#	%	#	%	#	%	#	%	Total votes cast
Atlantic	36,650	57.1%	26,697	41.6%	814	1.3%	9,953	15.5%	64,161
Burlington (part)	509	71.1%	163	28.3%	3	0.5%	246	42.8%	575
Camden (part)	1,653	65.0%	864	33.9%	28	1.1%	789	31.1%	2,545
Cape May	20,165	67.2%	9,580	31.9%	267	0.9%	10,585	35.3%	30,012
Cumberland	16,344	57.5%	11,782	41.4%	221	1.1%	4,562	16.1%	28,447
Gloucester (part)	13,651	63.9%	7,451	34.9%	268	1.2%	6,200	29.0%	21,370
Ocean (part)	8,031	68.9%	3,438	29.5%	185	1.6%	4,593	39.4%	11,654
Salem	11,972	65.5%	5,941	32.5%	361	1.9%	6,031	33.0%	18,274
Totals	108,875	61.5%	66,026	37.3%	2,247	1.3%	42,849	24.2%	177,148

== District 3 ==
2014 New Jersey's 3rd congressional district election
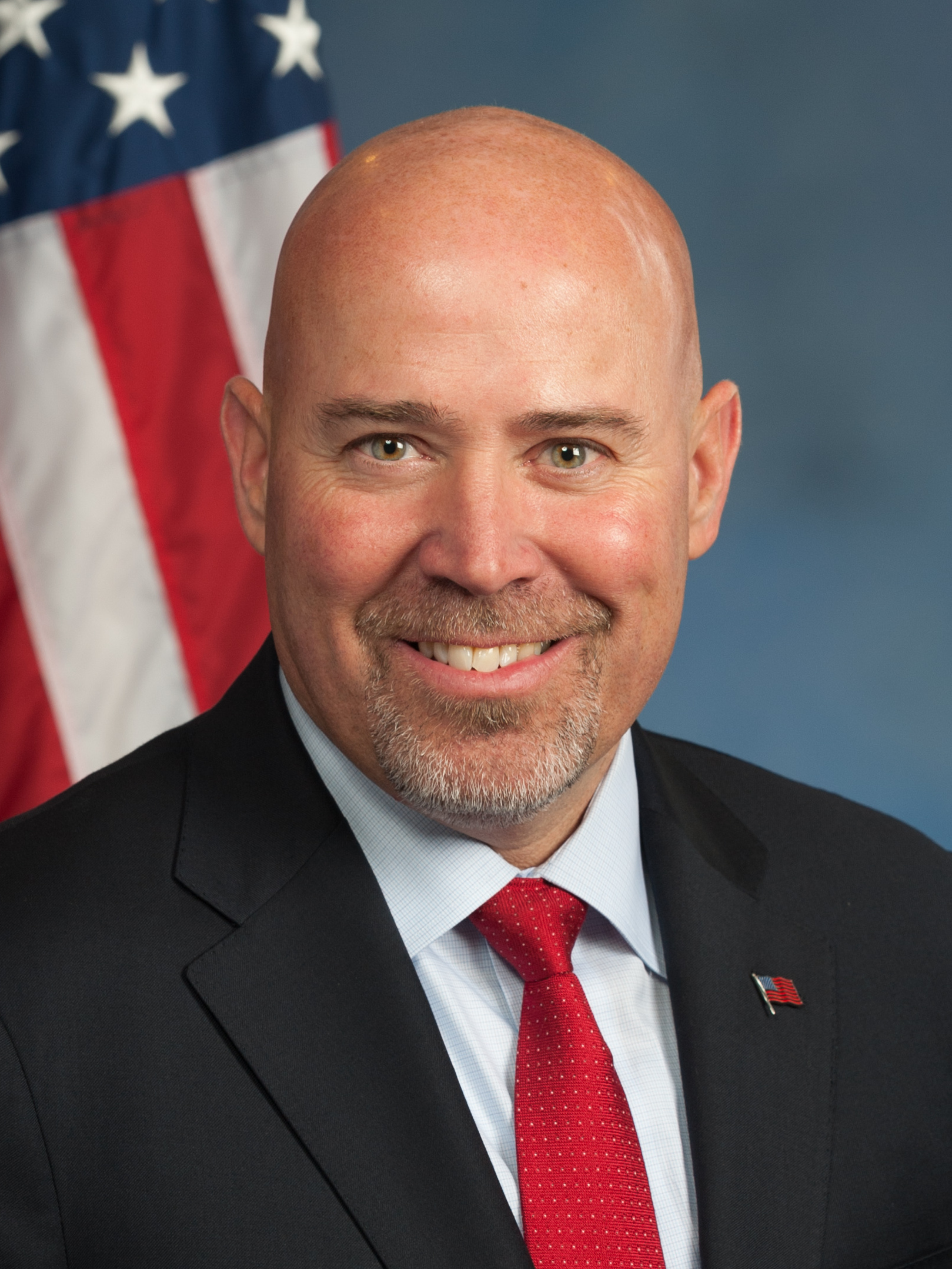

Nominee	Tom MacArthur	Aimee Belgard
Party	Republican	Democratic
Popular vote	100,471	82,537
Percentage	54.0%	44.3%
- MacArthur: 40–50% 50–60% 60–70% 70–80% Belgard: 40–50% 50–60% 60–70% 80–90%
U.S. Representative before election
Jon Runyan
Republican
Elected U.S. Representative
Tom MacArthur
Republican

The 3rd district is based in South Jersey and includes parts of Burlington and Ocean counties. Republican Jon Runyan, who had represented the district since 2011, retired, citing a desire to spend more time with his family.

=== Republican primary ===
==== Candidates ====
===== Nominee =====
- Tom MacArthur, former mayor of Randolph

===== Eliminated in primary =====
- Steve Lonegan, former mayor of Bogota, candidate for governor in 2005 and 2009 and nominee for the U.S. Senate in 2013

===== Withdrew =====
- James Byrnes, president of Berkeley Township Council
- Maurice Hill, retired U.S. Navy Rear Admiral and Toms River Township Councilman
- David W. Wolfe, state assemblyman

===== Declined =====
- Randy Brown, Mayor of Evesham
- Bruce Garganio, Burlington County Freeholder
- John Giordano, Assistant Commissioner for Compliance and Enforcement at the New Jersey Department of Environmental Protection
- Jon Runyan, incumbent U.S. representative

==== Polling ====
Poll source	Date(s) administered	Sample size	Margin of error	Steve Lonegan	Tom MacArthur	Undecided
Tarrance Group	May 18–20, 2014	400	± 4.9%	30%	43%	27%
Monmouth	May 12–14, 2014	505	± 4.4%	35%	46%	20%
National Research Inc. (R-MacArthur)	May 6–7, 2014	400	± 4.9%	28%	37%	35%

==== Results ====
Republican primary results
Party	Candidate	Votes	%
Republican	Tom MacArthur	15,261	59.7
Republican	Steve Lonegan	10,314	40.3
Total votes		25,575	100.0

=== Democratic primary ===
==== Candidates ====
===== Nominee =====
- Aimee Belgard, Burlington County Freeholder

===== Eliminated in primary =====
- Howard Kleinhendler, corporate lawyer and nominee for New Jersey's 4th congressional district in 2010

===== Withdrew =====
- Jack Fanous, co-founder and executive director of the G.I. Go Fund

===== Declined =====
- Herb Conaway, state assemblyman
- Troy Singleton, state assemblyman

==== Results ====
Democratic primary results
Party	Candidate	Votes	%
Democratic	Aimee Belgard	11,649	83.6
Democratic	Howard Kleinhendler	1,623	11.6
Democratic	Bruce Todd	673	4.8
Total votes		13,945	100.0

=== General election ===
==== Endorsements ====
Tom MacArthur (R)

U.S. Representative

- Jon Runyan, U.S. representative for New Jersey's 3rd congressional district

Organizations

- National Federation of Independent Business
- National Rifle Association - Political Victory Fund
- National Right to Life Committee
- United States Chamber of Commerce

Newspapers

- The Philadelphia Inquirer
Aimee Belgard (D)

Labor unions

- AFL-CIO
- National Association of Letter Carriers
- National Education Association

Organizations

- Democratic Congressional Campaign Committee "Red to Blue" Program
- EMILY's List
- Human Rights Campaign
- League of Conservation Voters
- National Organization for Women
- Sierra Club

==== Polling ====
Poll source	Date(s) administered	Sample size	Margin of error	Tom MacArthur (R)	Aimee Belgard (D)	Other	Undecided
Stockton College	October 25–28, 2014	617	± 3.9%	46%	41%	5%	8%
Monmouth University	October 9–13, 2014	423	± 4.8%	51%	41%	2%	6%
DCCC (D)	September 27–28, 2014	603	± 4%	42%	43%	—	15%
GBA Strategies/DCCC (D)	September 15, 2014	400	± 4.6%	46%	43%	0%	11%
Stockton College	September 12–13, 2014	606	± 4%	42%	42%	3%	13%

==== Predictions ====
Source	Ranking	As of
The Cook Political Report	Lean R	November 3, 2014
Rothenberg	Lean R	October 24, 2014
Sabato's Crystal Ball	Lean R	October 30, 2014
RCP	Lean R	November 2, 2014
Daily Kos Elections	Lean R	November 4, 2014

==== Results ====
New Jersey's 3rd congressional district, 2014
Party	Candidate	Votes	%
Republican	Tom MacArthur	100,471	54.0
Democratic	Aimee Belgard	82,537	44.3
Independent	Frederick John Lavergne	3,095	1.7
Total votes		186,103	100.0
Republican hold			

==== By county ====
County	Tom MacArthur Republican		Aimee Belgard Democratic		Frederick Lavergne Independent		Margin		Total votes cast
County	#	%	#	%	#	%	#	%	Total votes cast
Burlington (part)	54,953	49.4%	55,305	49.7%	1,015	0.9%	-352	-0.3%	111,273
Ocean (part)	45,518	60.8%	27,232	36.4%	2,080	2.8%	18,286	24.4%	74,830
Totals	100,471	54.0%	82,537	44.4%	3,095	1.7%	17,934	9.6%	186,103

== District 4 ==
2014 New Jersey's 4th congressional district election
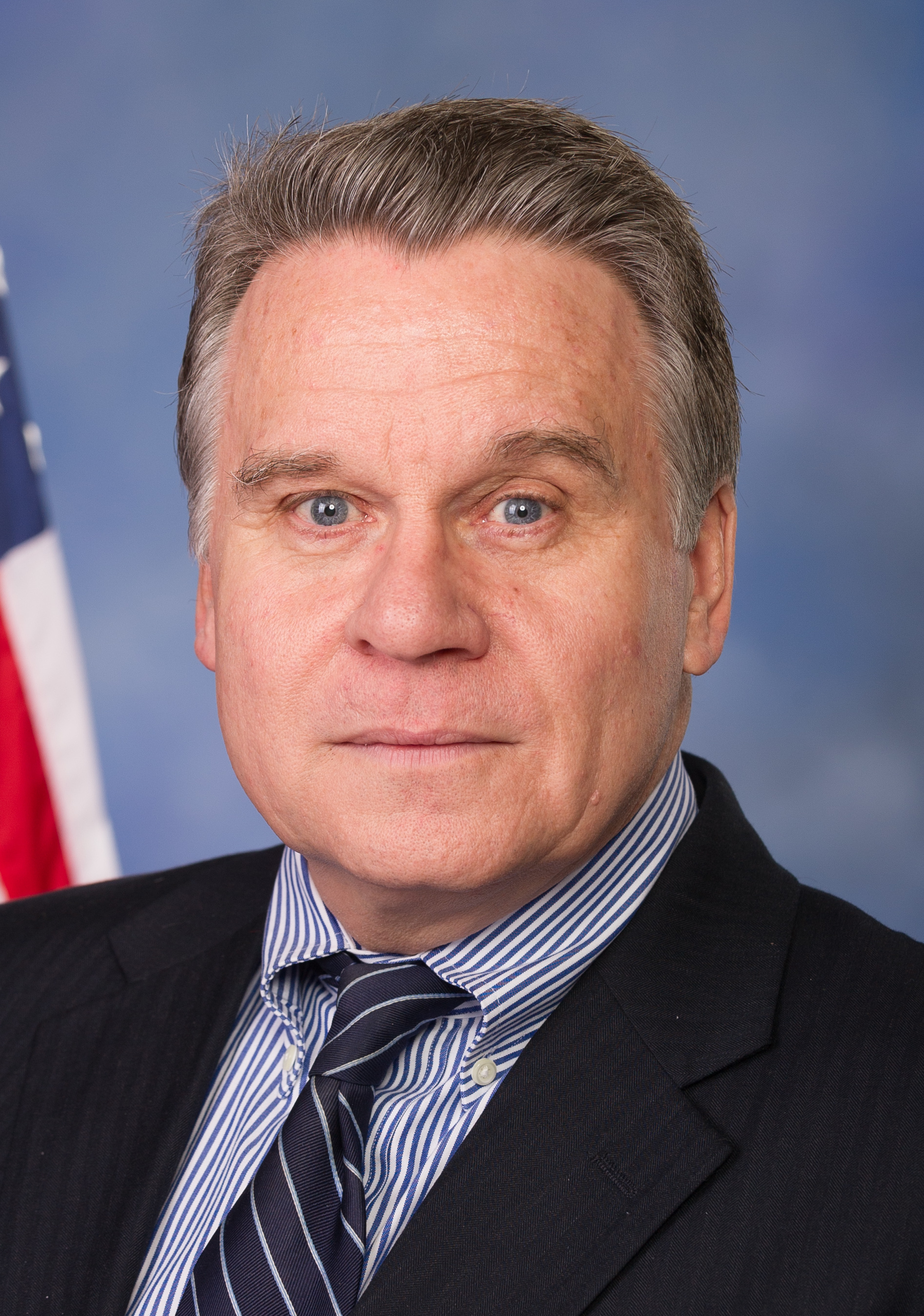

Nominee	Chris Smith	Ruben M. Scolavino
Party	Republican	Democratic
Popular vote	118,826	54,415
Percentage	68%	31.1%
- Smith: 50–60% 60–70% 70–80% 80–90% Scolavino: 50–60% 60–70%
U.S. Representative before election
Chris Smith
Republican
Elected U.S. Representative
Chris Smith
Republican

The fourth district is represented by Republican congressman Chris Smith. Ruben Scolavino, a criminal defense attorney and a former candidate for Monmouth County Sheriff, was endorsed by the Mercer, Monmouth, and Ocean County Democratic committees.

=== Republican primary ===
==== Candidates ====
===== Nominee =====
- Chris Smith, incumbent U.S. representative

==== Results ====
Republican primary results
Party	Candidate	Votes	%
Republican	Chris Smith (incumbent)	14,786	100.0
Total votes		14,786	100.0

=== Democratic primary ===
==== Candidates ====
===== Nominee =====
- Ruben Scolavino, criminal defense attorney and former candidate for Monmouth County Sheriff

==== Results ====
Democratic primary results
Party	Candidate	Votes	%
Democratic	Ruben Scolavino	8,108	100.0
Total votes		8,108	100.0

=== General election ===
==== Endorsements ====
Chris Smith (R)

Labor unions

- AFL-CIO
- National Association of Letter Carriers

Organizations

- National Federation of Independent Business
- National Right to Life Committee
Ruben Scolavino (D)

Organizations

- National Organization for Women

==== Predictions ====
Source	Ranking	As of
The Cook Political Report	Safe R	November 3, 2014
Rothenberg	Safe R	October 24, 2014
Sabato's Crystal Ball	Safe R	October 30, 2014
RCP	Safe R	November 2, 2014
Daily Kos Elections	Safe R	November 4, 2014

==== Results ====
New Jersey's 4th congressional district, 2014
Party	Candidate	Votes	%
Republican	Chris Smith (incumbent)	118,826	68.0
Democratic	Ruben M. Scolavino	54,415	31.1
Independent	Scott Neuman	1,608	0.9
Total votes		174,849	100.0
Republican hold			

==== By county ====
County	Chris Smith Republican		Ruben Scolavino Democratic		Scott Neuman Independent		Margin		Total votes cast
County	#	%	#	%	#	%	#	%	Total votes cast
Mercer (part)	15,630	65.3%	7,948	33.2%	342	1.4%	7,682	32.1%	23,290
Monmouth (part)	66,308	65.3%	34,651	34.1%	549	0.5%	31,657	31.2%	101,508
Ocean (part)	36,888	74.6%	11,816	23.9%	717	1.5%	25,072	50.4%	49,421
Totals	118,826	68.0%	54,415	31.1%	1,608	0.9%	64,411	36.9%	174,849

== District 5 ==
2014 New Jersey's 5th congressional district election
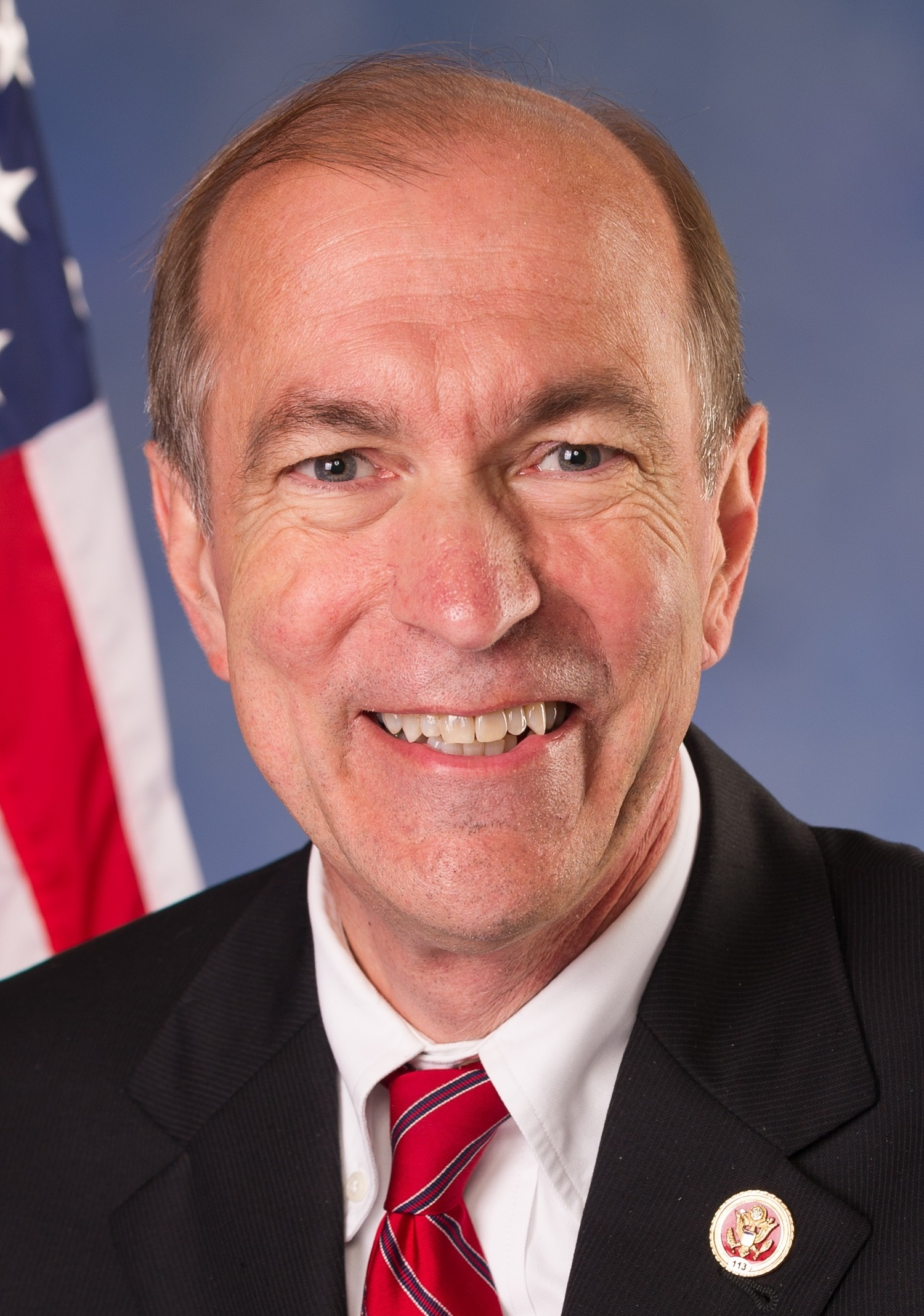

Nominee	Scott Garrett	Roy Cho
Party	Republican	Democratic
Popular vote	104,678	81,808
Percentage	55.4%	43.3%
- Garrett: 50–60% 60–70% 70–80% 80–90% Cho: 50–60% 60–70% 70–80%
U.S. Representative before election
Scott Garrett
Republican
Elected U.S. Representative
Scott Garrett
Republican

Republican incumbent Scott Garrett won re-election in the fifth district in the 2012 House of Representatives elections. Redistricting made the district more competitive for members of the Democratic Party.

=== Republican primary ===
==== Candidates ====
===== Nominee =====
- Scott Garrett, incumbent U.S. representative

==== Results ====
Republican primary results
Party	Candidate	Votes	%
Republican	Scott Garrett (incumbent)	15,411	100.0
Total votes		15,411	100.0

=== Democratic primary ===
Roy Cho, a Democrat who has worked for the governor's office and Port Authority of New York and New Jersey, ran against the incumbent Garrett.

==== Candidates ====
===== Nominee =====
- Roy Cho, attorney, former congressional aide, and former gubernatorial aide

===== Eliminated in primary =====
- Diane Sare, LaRouche movement activist, candidate for this seat in 2012, independent candidate for governor in 2013

===== Declined =====
- Robert M. Gordon, state senator
- Tracy Silna Zur, Bergen County Freeholder

==== Results ====
Democratic primary results
Party	Candidate	Votes	%
Democratic	Roy Cho	8,983	90.4
Democratic	Diane Sare	954	9.6
Total votes		9,937	100.0

=== General election ===
==== Campaign ====
In the general election, the two largest newspapers in New Jersey both endorsed Cho. The Star-Ledger called Garrett "a retrograde culture warrior who wants to eliminate a woman's right to choose" and criticized his support for the 2013 budget sequester, which hurt New Jersey; by contrast, Cho is "a centrist who actually wants to govern." The Bergen Record criticized Garrett as "a dogmatic conservative who believes ideology trumps compromise" and agreed with Cho's call for a federal role in improving the region's transportation infrastructure.

==== Endorsements ====
Scott Garrett (R)

Organizations

- Eagle Forum
- National Federation of Independent Business
- National Rifle Association - Political Victory Fund
- National Right to Life Committee
Roy Cho (D)

Labor unions

- AFL-CIO
- National Education Association

Organizations

- League of Conservation Voters
- National Organization for Women
- Sierra Club

Newspapers

- The Bergen Record
- The Star-Ledger

Individuals

- Ghostface Killah, rapper

==== Polling ====
Poll source	Date(s) administered	Sample size	Margin of error	Scott Garrett (R)	Roy Cho (D)	Other	Undecided
Monmouth University	October 27–29, 2014	427	± 4.8%	53%	42%	2%	3%
Garin-Hart-Yang Research (D-Cho)	October 13–15, 2014	400	± 5%	47%	40%	—	13%
Monmouth University	October 10–14, 2014	432	± 4.7%	48%	43%	3%	6%
Garin-Hart-Yang Research (D-Cho)	June 19–22, 2014	404	± 5%	47%	34%	—	19%

==== Predictions ====
Source	Ranking	As of
The Cook Political Report	Likely R	November 3, 2014
Rothenberg	Safe R	October 24, 2014
Sabato's Crystal Ball	Safe R	October 30, 2014
RCP	Safe R	November 2, 2014
Daily Kos Elections	Likely R	November 4, 2014

==== Results ====
New Jersey's 5th congressional district, 2014
Party	Candidate	Votes	%
Republican	Scott Garrett (incumbent)	104,678	55.4
Democratic	Roy Cho	81,808	43.3
Independent	Mark D Quick	2,435	1.3
Total votes		188,921	100.0
Republican hold			

==== By county ====
County	Scott Garrett Republican		Roy Cho Democratic		Mark Quick Independent		Margin		Total votes cast
County	#	%	#	%	#	%	#	%	Total votes cast
Bergen (part)	71,318	51.2%	66,771	48.0%	1,133	0.8%	4,547	3.2%	139,222
Passaic (part)	6,387	65.2%	3,233	33.0%	179	1.8%	3,154	32.2%	9,799
Sussex (part)	16,310	67.7%	7,128	29.6%	642	2.7%	9,182	38.1%	24,080
Warren (part)	10,663	67.4%	4,676	29.6%	481	3.0%	5,987	37.8%	15,820
Totals	104,678	55.4%	81,808	43.3%	2,435	1.3%	22,870	12.1%	188,921

== District 6 ==
2014 New Jersey's 6th congressional district election
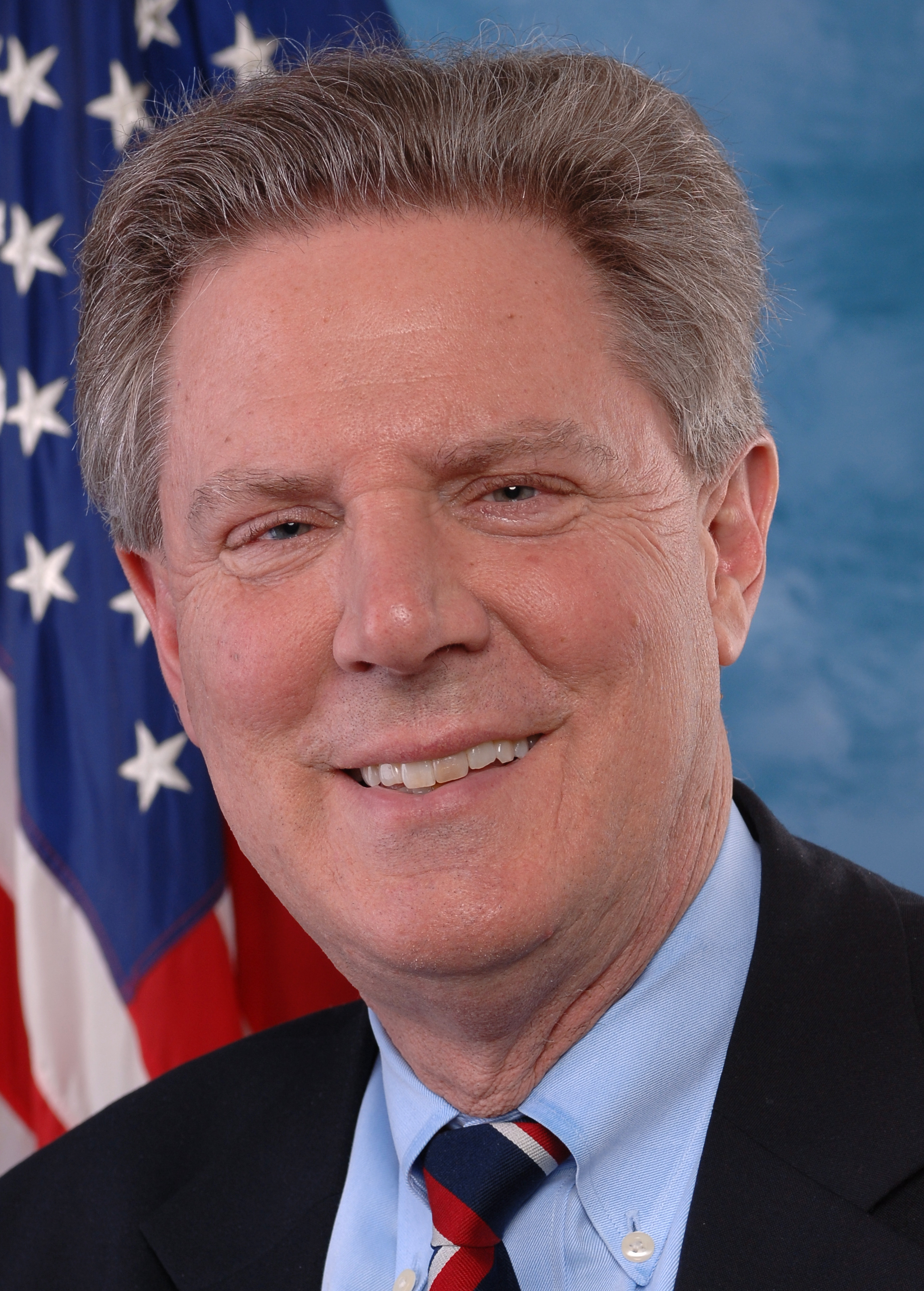

Nominee	Frank Pallone	Anthony E. Wilkinson
Party	Democratic	Republican
Popular vote	72,190	46,891
Percentage	59.9%	38.9%
- Pallone: 40–50% 50–60% 60–70% 70–80% 80–90% Wilkinson: 40–50% 50–60% Tie: 50%
U.S. Representative before election
Frank Pallone
Democratic
Elected U.S. Representative
Frank Pallone
Democratic

The sixth district, represented by Democratic congressman Frank Pallone, was considered a long-shot pick up opportunity for Republicans, but only if Pallone retired. Old Bridge attorney Anthony Wilkinson ran in the Republican primary.

=== Democratic primary ===
==== Candidates ====
===== Nominee =====
- Frank Pallone, incumbent U.S. representative

==== Results ====
Democratic primary results
Party	Candidate	Votes	%
Democratic	Frank Pallone (incumbent)	11,321	100.0
Total votes		11,321	100.0

=== Republican primary ===
==== Candidates ====
===== Nominee =====
- Anthony Wilkinson, attorney

===== Withdrawn =====
- Anna Little, former mayor of Highlands and nominee for this seat in 2010 & 2012

==== Results ====
Republican primary results
Party	Candidate	Votes	%
Republican	Anthony Wilkinson	4,806	100.0
Total votes		4,806	100.0

=== General election ===
==== Endorsements ====
Frank Pallone (D)

Labor unions

- AFL-CIO
- National Association of Letter Carriers
- National Education Association

Organizations

- Human Rights Campaign
- National Organization for Women
- Sierra Club

==== Predictions ====
Source	Ranking	As of
The Cook Political Report	Safe D	November 3, 2014
Rothenberg	Safe D	October 24, 2014
Sabato's Crystal Ball	Safe D	October 30, 2014
RCP	Safe D	November 2, 2014
Daily Kos Elections	Safe D	November 4, 2014

==== Results ====
New Jersey's 6th congressional district, 2014
Party	Candidate	Votes	%
Democratic	Frank Pallone (incumbent)	72,190	59.9
Republican	Anthony E. Wilkinson	46,891	38.9
Libertarian	Dorit Goikhman	1,376	1.2
Total votes		120,457	100.0
Democratic hold			

==== By county ====
County	Frank Pallone Democratic		Anthony Wilkinson Republican		Dorit Goikhman Libertarian		Margin		Total votes cast
County	#	%	#	%	#	%	#	%	Total votes cast
Middlesex (part)	48,471	64.9%	25,519	34.2%	677	0.9%	22,952	30.7%	74,667
Monmouth (part)	23,719	51.8%	21,372	46.7%	699	1.5%	2,347	5.1%	45,790
Totals	72,190	59.9%	46,891	38.9%	1,376	1.1%	25,299	21.0%	120,457

== District 7 ==
2014 New Jersey's 7th congressional district election
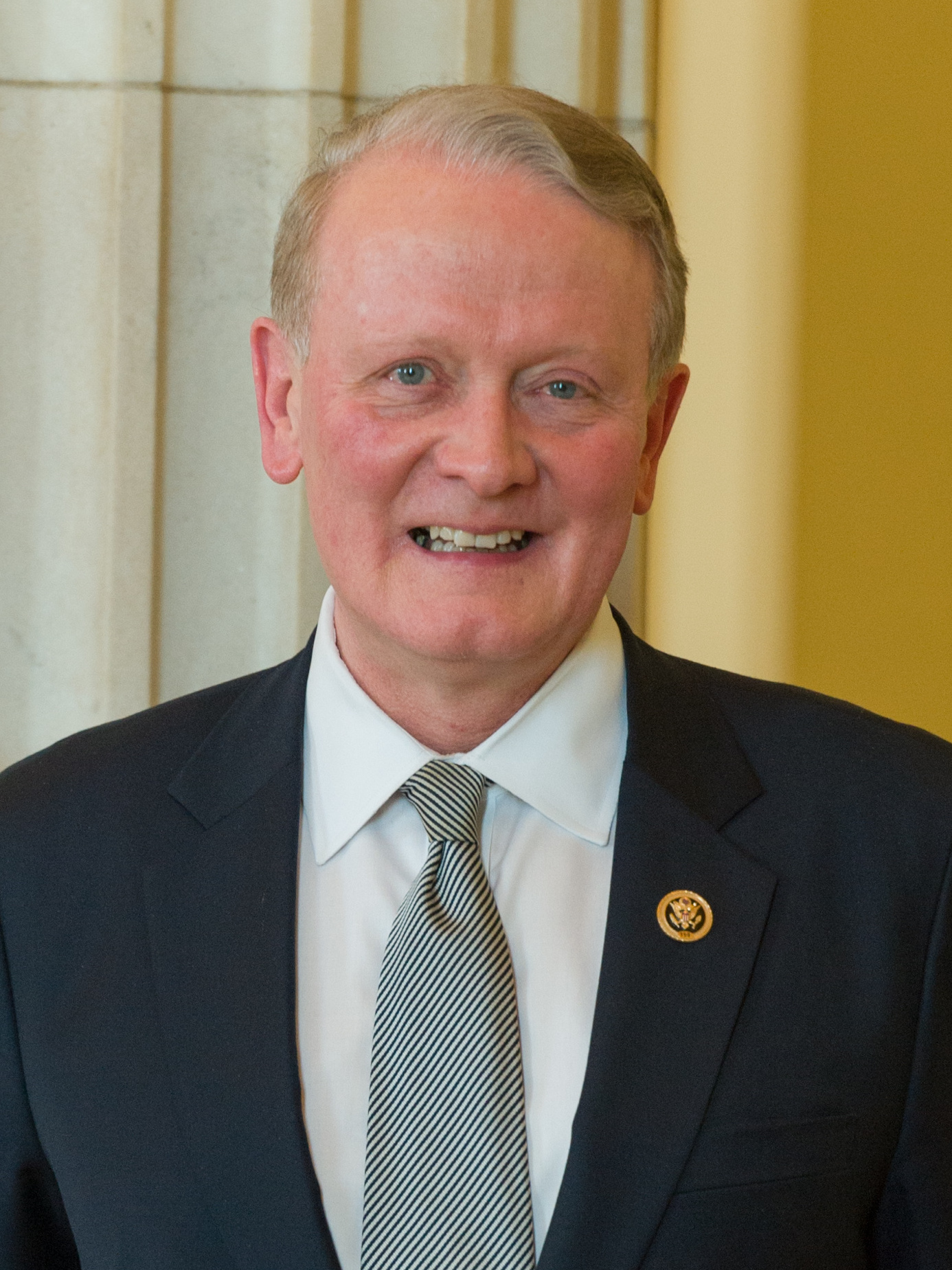

Nominee	Leonard Lance	Janice Kovach
Party	Republican	Democratic
Popular vote	104,287	68,232
Percentage	59.2%	38.8%
- Lance: 40–50% 50–60% 60–70% 70–80% Kovach: 40–50% 50–60% 60–70%
U.S. Representative before election
Leonard Lance
Republican
Elected U.S. Representative
Leonard Lance
Republican

In the seventh district, incumbent Republican congressman Leonard Lance faced a primary challenge from perennial challenger David Larsen.

=== Republican primary ===
==== Candidates ====
===== Nominee =====
- Leonard Lance, incumbent U.S. representative

===== Eliminated in primary =====
- David Larsen, businessman and candidate for this seat in 2010 & 2012

==== Results ====
Republican primary results
Party	Candidate	Votes	%
Republican	Leonard Lance (incumbent)	15,609	54.4
Republican	David Larsen	13,105	45.6
Total votes		28,714	100.0

=== Democratic primary ===
==== Candidates ====
===== Nominee =====
- Janice Kovach, Mayor of Clinton and Secretary of the New Jersey Democratic Party

==== Results ====
Democratic primary results
Party	Candidate	Votes	%
Democratic	Janice Kovach	8,485	100.0
Turnout		8,485	100.0

=== General election ===
==== Endorsements ====
Leonard Lance (R)

Labor unions

- National Association of Letter Carriers

Organizations

- National Federation of Independent Business
- National Rifle Association - Political Victory Fund
- National Right to Life Committee
Janice Kovach (D)

Labor unions

- AFL-CIO

==== Predictions ====
Source	Ranking	As of
The Cook Political Report	Safe R	November 3, 2014
Rothenberg	Safe R	October 24, 2014
Sabato's Crystal Ball	Safe R	October 30, 2014
RCP	Safe R	November 2, 2014
Daily Kos Elections	Safe R	November 4, 2014

==== Results ====
New Jersey's 7th congressional district, 2014
Party	Candidate	Votes	%
Republican	Leonard Lance (incumbent)	104,287	59.2
Democratic	Janice E. Kovach	68,232	38.8
Libertarian	James Gawron	3,478	2.0
Total votes		175,997	100.0
Republican hold			

==== By county ====
County	Leonard Lance Republican		Jaince Kovach Democratic		James Gawron Libertarian		Margin		Total votes cast
County	#	%	#	%	#	%	#	%	Total votes cast
Essex (part)	2,396	49.0%	2,431	49.7%	64	1.3%	-35	-0.7%	4,891
Hunterdon	23,016	62.6%	12,707	34.6%	1,033	2.8%	10,309	28.0%	36,756
Morris (part)	15,698	62.9%	8,843	35.4%	422	1.7%	6,855	27.5%	24,963
Somerset (part)	33,693	59.4%	22,241	39.2%	816	1.4%	11,452	20.2%	56,750
Union (part)	24,683	55.0%	19,416	43.2%	803	1.8%	5,267	11.8%	44,902
Warren	4,801	62.1%	2,594	33.5%	340	4.4%	2,207	28.6%	7,735
Totals	104,287	59.3%	68,232	38.8%	3,478	2.0%	36,055	20.5%	175,997

== District 8 ==
2014 New Jersey's 8th congressional district election
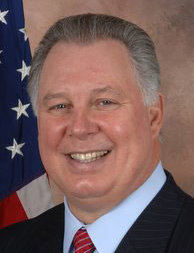

Nominee	Albio Sires	Jude Anthony Tiscornia
Party	Democratic	Republican
Popular vote	61,510	15,141
Percentage	77.4%	19%
- Sires: 60–70% 70–80% 80–90%
U.S. Representative before election
Albio Sires
Democratic
Elected U.S. Representative
Albio Sires
Democratic

The eighth district is represented by Democratic congressman Albio Sires.

=== Democratic primary ===
==== Candidates ====
===== Nominee =====
- Albio Sires, incumbent U.S. representative

==== Results ====
Democratic primary results
Party	Candidate	Votes	%
Democratic	Albio Sires (incumbent)	24,946	100.0
Turnout		24,946	100.0

=== Republican primary ===
==== Candidates ====
===== Nominee =====
- Jude-Anthony Tiscornia, attorney and State Assembly candidate in 2013

==== Results ====
Republican primary results
Party	Candidate	Votes	%
Republican	Jude-Anthony Tiscornia	1,951	100.0
Turnout		1,951	100.0

=== General election ===
==== Endorsements ====
Albio Sires (D)

Labor unions

- AFL-CIO
- National Association of Letter Carriers
- National Education Association

Organizations

- Human Rights Campaign
- Sierra Club

==== Predictions ====
Source	Ranking	As of
The Cook Political Report	Safe D	November 3, 2014
Rothenberg	Safe D	October 24, 2014
Sabato's Crystal Ball	Safe D	October 30, 2014
RCP	Safe D	November 2, 2014
Daily Kos Elections	Safe D	November 4, 2014

==== Results ====
New Jersey's 8th congressional district, 2014
Party	Candidate	Votes	%
Democratic	Albio Sires (incumbent)	61,510	77.4
Republican	Jude Anthony Tiscornia	15,141	19.0
Independent	Herbert H. Shaw	1,192	1.5
Independent	Pablo Olivera	1,022	1.3
Independent	Robert Thorne	653	0.8
Total votes		79,518	100.0
Democratic hold			

==== By county ====
County	Albio Sires Democratic		Jude Tiscornia Republican		Various candidates Other parties		Margin		Total votes cast
County	#	%	#	%	#	%	#	%	Total votes cast
Bergen (part)	1,189	74.0%	373	23.2%	44	2.8%	816	50.8%	1,606
Essex (part)	9,099	75.9%	2,358	19.7%	533	4.5%	6,741	56.2%	11,990
Hudson (part)	42,889	77.3%	10,671	19.2%	1,941	3.5%	32,218	58.1%	55,501
Union (part)	8,333	80.0%	1,739	16.7%	349	3.4%	6,594	63.3%	10,421
Totals	61,510	77.4%	15,141	19.0%	2,867	3.6%	46,369	58.4%	79,518

== District 9 ==
2014 New Jersey's 9th congressional district election
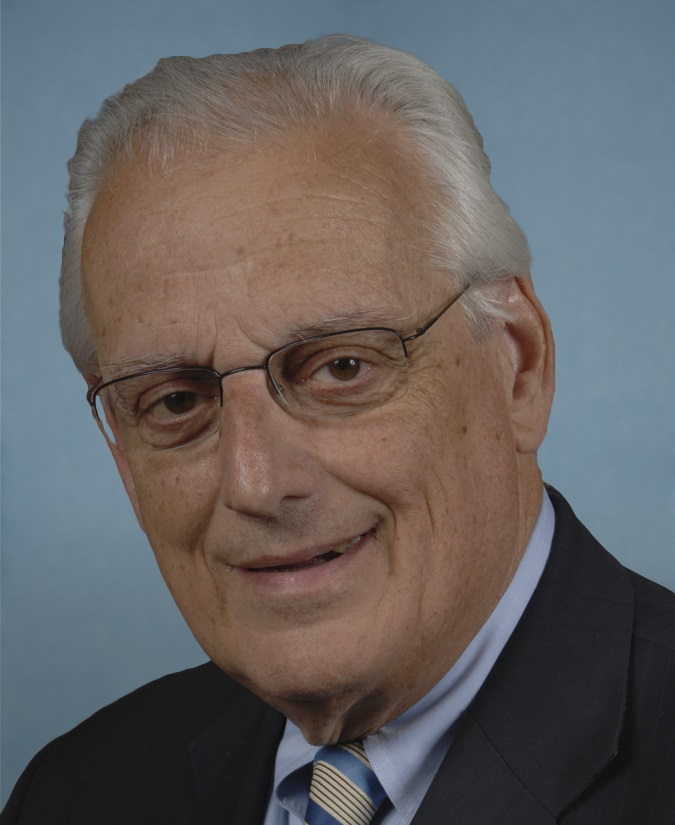

Nominee	Bill Pascrell	Dierdre G. Paul
Party	Democratic	Republican
Popular vote	82,498	36,246
Percentage	68.5%	30.1%
- Pascrell: 50–60% 60–70% 70–80% 80–90% >90% Paul: 40–50% 50–60% Tie: 50%
U.S. Representative before election
Bill Pascrell
Democratic
Elected U.S. Representative
Bill Pascrell
Democratic

The ninth district is represented by Democratic congressman Bill Pascrell.

=== Democratic primary ===
==== Candidates ====
===== Nominee =====
- Bill Pascrell, incumbent U.S. representative

==== Results ====
Democratic primary results
Party	Candidate	Votes	%
Democratic	Bill Pascrell (incumbent)	12,333	100.0
Total votes		12,333	100.0

=== Republican primary ===
==== Candidates ====
===== Nominee =====
- Dierdre Paul, college professor and State Assembly candidate in 2013

===== Withdrew =====
- Michael Oren Epstein, attorney

==== Results ====
Republican primary results
Party	Candidate	Votes	%
Republican	Dierdre Paul	4,161	100.0
Turnout		4,161	100.0

=== General election ===
==== Endorsements ====
Bill Pascrell (D)

Labor unions

- AFL-CIO
- National Association of Letter Carriers
- National Education Association

Organizations

- Human Rights Campaign
- Sierra Club

Newspapers

- Herald News
- The Bergen Record

==== Predictions ====
Source	Ranking	As of
The Cook Political Report	Safe D	November 3, 2014
Rothenberg	Safe D	October 24, 2014
Sabato's Crystal Ball	Safe D	October 30, 2014
RCP	Safe D	November 2, 2014
Daily Kos Elections	Safe D	November 4, 2014

==== Results ====
New Jersey's 9th congressional district, 2014
Party	Candidate	Votes	%
Democratic	Bill Pascrell (Incumbent)	82,498	68.5
Republican	Dierdre G. Paul	36,246	30.1
Independent	Nestor Montilla	1,715	1.4
Total votes		120,459	100.0
Democratic hold			

==== By county ====
County	Bill Pascrell Democratic		Dierde Paul Republican		Nestor Montilla Independent		Margin		Total votes cast
County	#	%	#	%	#	%	#	%	Total votes cast
Bergen (part)	44,410	62.7%	25,635	36.2%	754	1.1%	18,775	26.5%	70,799
Hudson (part)	3,101	60.8%	1,791	35.1%	207	4.1%	1,310	25.7%	5,099
Passaic (part)	34,987	78.5%	8,820	19.8%	754	1.7%	26,167	58.7%	44,561
Totals	82,498	68.5%	36,246	30.1%	1,715	1.4%	46,252	38.4%	120,459

== District 10 ==
2014 New Jersey's 10th congressional district election
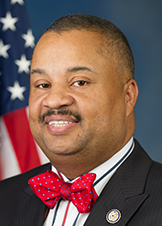

Nominee	Donald Payne Jr.	Yolanda Dentley
Party	Democratic	Republican
Popular vote	95,734	14,154
Percentage	85.4%	12.6%
- Payne: 50–60% 60–70% 70–80% 80–90% >90%
U.S. Representative before election
Donald Payne Jr.
Democratic
Elected U.S. Representative
Donald Payne Jr.
Democratic

The tenth district is represented by Democratic congressman Donald Payne. Curtis Alphonzo Vaughn III, Robert Louis Toussaint, and Aaron Fraser also ran in the Democratic primary. Yolanda Dentley ran in the Republican primary.

=== Democratic primary ===
==== Candidates ====
===== Nominee =====
- Donald Payne, Jr., incumbent U.S. representative

===== Eliminated in primary =====
- Aaron Fraser
- Robert Toussaint, independent candidate in 2010
- Curtis Vaughn

==== Results ====
Democratic primary results
Party	Candidate	Votes	%
Democratic	Donald Payne (incumbent)	23,965	91.3
Democratic	Robert Toussaint	1,259	4.8
Democratic	Aaron Fraser	666	2.6
Democratic	Curtis Vaughn	349	1.3
Total votes		26,239	100.0

=== Republican primary ===
==== Candidates ====
===== Nominee =====
- Yolanda Dentley, middle school vice principal

==== Results ====
Republican primary election results
Party	Candidate	Votes	%
Republican	Yolanda Dentley	1,443	100.0
Total votes		1,443	100.0

=== Independents ===
==== Candidates ====
- Dark Angel, economics major and theater minor at Kean University

=== General election ===
==== Endorsements ====
Donald Payne, Jr. (D)

Labor unions

- AFL-CIO
- National Association of Letter Carriers
- National Education Association

Organizations

- Human Rights Campaign
- Sierra Club

==== Predictions ====
Source	Ranking	As of
The Cook Political Report	Safe D	November 3, 2014
Rothenberg	Safe D	October 24, 2014
Sabato's Crystal Ball	Safe D	October 30, 2014
RCP	Safe D	November 2, 2014
Daily Kos Elections	Safe D	November 4, 2014

==== Results ====
New Jersey's 10th congressional district, 2014
Party	Candidate	Votes	%
Democratic	Donald Payne, Jr. (incumbent)	95,734	85.4
Republican	Yolanda Dentley	14,154	12.6
Independent	Gwendolyn A. Franklin	1,237	1.1
Independent	Dark Angel	998	0.9
Total votes		112,123	100.0
Democratic hold			

==== By county ====
County	Donald Payne Jr. Democratic		Yolanda Dentley Republican		Various candidates Other parties		Margin		Total votes cast
County	#	%	#	%	#	%	#	%	Total votes cast
Essex (part)	59,989	90.1%	5,469	8.2%	1,094	1.7%	54,520	81.9%	66,552
Hudson (part)	14,866	81.9%	2,748	15.1%	539	3.0%	12,118	66.8%	18,153
Union (part)	20,879	76.2%	5,937	21.7%	602	2.2%	14,942	54.5%	27,418
Totals	95,734	85.4%	14,154	12.6%	2,235	2.0%	81,580	72.8%	112,123

== District 11 ==
2014 New Jersey's 11th congressional district election
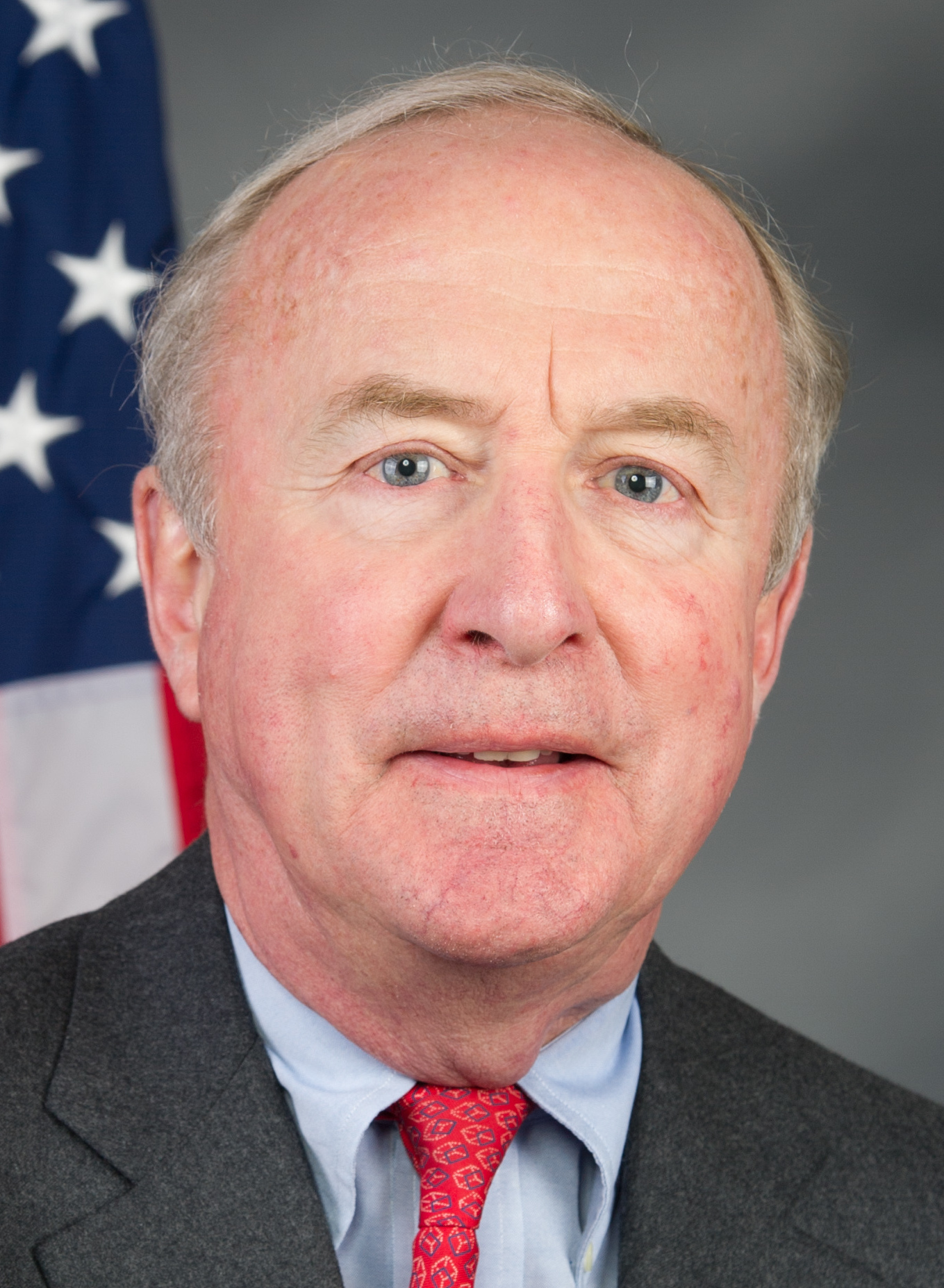

Nominee	Rodney Frelinghuysen	Mark Dunec
Party	Republican	Democratic
Popular vote	109,455	65,477
Percentage	62.6%	37.4%
- Frelinghuysen: 50–60% 60–70% 70–80% 80–90% Dunec: 50–60% 60–70% 70–80%
U.S. Representative before election
Rodney Frelinghuysen
Republican
Elected U.S. Representative
Rodney Frelinghuysen
Republican

The 11th district is held by Republican congressman Rodney Frelinghuysen. Frelinghuysen and Rick Van Glahn ran in the Republican primary.

=== Republican primary ===
==== Candidates ====
===== Nominee =====
- Rodney Frelinghuysen, incumbent U.S. representative

===== Eliminated in primary =====
- Rick Van Glahn, home improvement contractor

==== Results ====
Republican primary results
Party	Candidate	Votes	%
Republican	Rodney Frelinghuysen (incumbent)	15,379	66.6
Republican	Rick Van Glahn	7,700	33.4
Total votes		23,079	100.0

=== Democratic primary ===
==== Candidates ====
===== Nominee =====
- Mark Dunec, management consultant

===== Eliminated in primary =====
- Lee Anne Brogowski
- Brian Murphy

==== Results ====
Democratic primary results
Party	Candidate	Votes	%
Democratic	Mark Dunec	6,855	76.0
Democratic	Brian Murphy	1,105	12.3
Democratic	Lee Anne Brogowski	1,059	11.7
Total votes		9,019	100.0

=== General election ===
==== Endorsements ====
Rodney Frelinghuysen (R)

Organizations

- National Federation of Independent Business
Mark Dunec (D)

Labor unions

- AFL-CIO
- National Education Association

Organizations

- National Organization for Women

==== Predictions ====
Source	Ranking	As of
The Cook Political Report	Safe R	November 3, 2014
Rothenberg	Safe R	October 24, 2014
Sabato's Crystal Ball	Safe R	October 30, 2014
RCP	Safe R	November 2, 2014
Daily Kos Elections	Safe R	November 4, 2014

==== Results ====
New Jersey's 11th congressional district, 2014
Party	Candidate	Votes	%
Republican	Rodney Frelinghuysen (incumbent)	109,455	62.6
Democratic	Mark Dunec	65,477	37.4
Total votes		174,932	100.0
Republican hold			

==== By county ====
County	Rodney Frelinghuysen Republican		Mark Dunec Democratic		Margin		Total votes cast
County	#	%	#	%	#	%	Total votes cast
Essex (part)	22,924	51.7%	21,386	48.3%	1,538	3.4%	44,310
Morris (part)	58,640	66.3%	29,778	33.7%	28,862	32.6%	88,418
Passaic (part)	19,525	64.1%	10,938	35.9%	8,587	38.2%	30,463
Sussex (part)	8,366	71.3%	3,375	28.7%	4,991	42.6%	11,741
Totals	109,455	62.6%	65,477	37.4%	43,978	25.2%	174,932

== District 12 ==
2014 New Jersey's 12th congressional district election
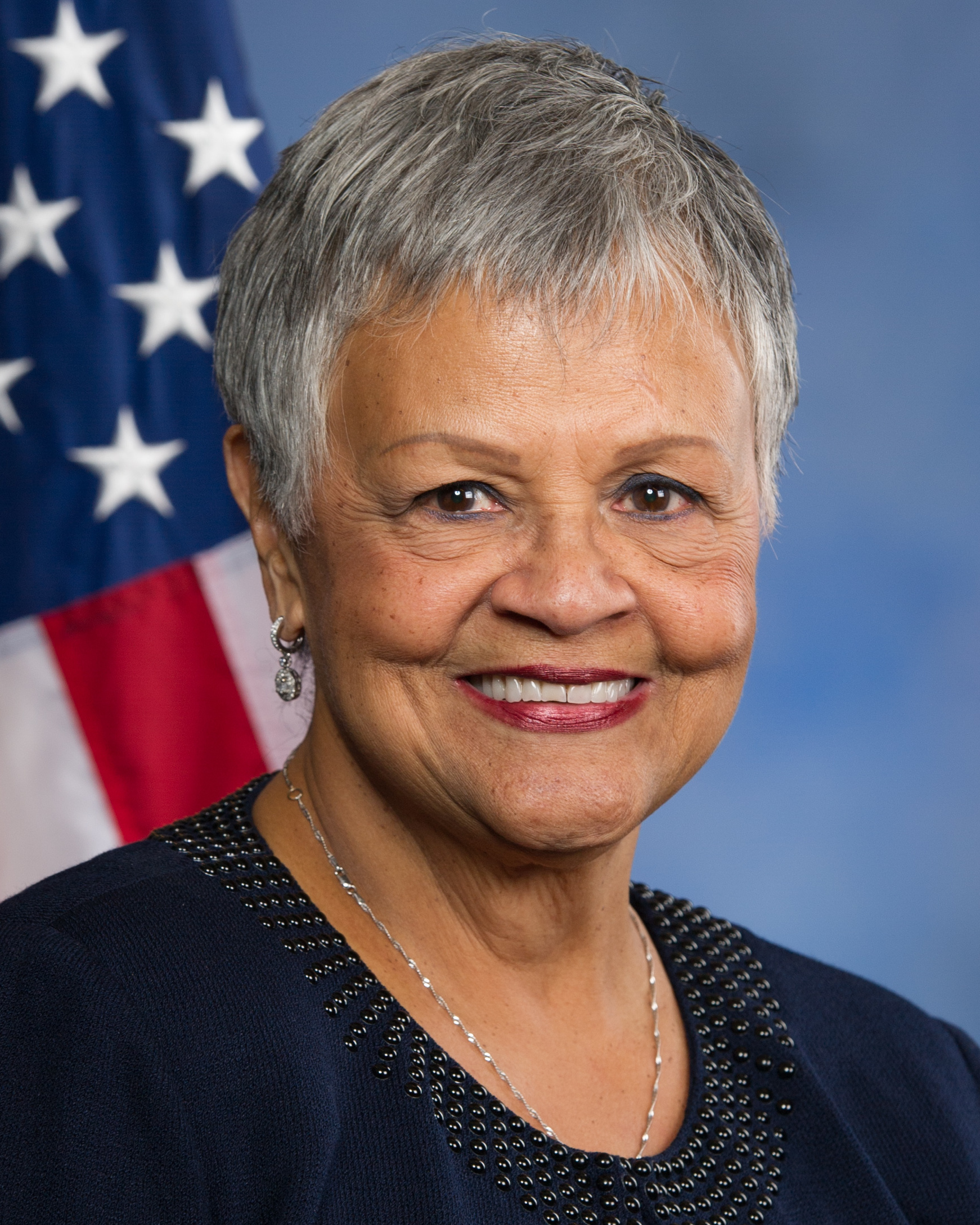

Nominee	Bonnie Watson Coleman	Alieta Eck
Party	Democratic	Republican
Popular vote	90,430	54,168
Percentage	60.9%	36.5%
- Watson Coleman: 50–60% 60–70% 70–80% >90% Eck: 40–50% 50–60%
U.S. Representative before election
Rush Holt Jr.
Democratic
Elected U.S. Representative
Bonnie Watson Coleman
Democratic

The 12th district is based in Central Jersey and includes parts of Mercer, Middlesex, Somerset and Union counties. The district is known for its research centers and educational institutions such as Princeton University, Institute for Advanced Study, Johnson & Johnson and Bristol-Myers Squibb. Democrat Rush D. Holt, Jr., who had represented the district since 1999, retired, leaving the seat open.

=== Democratic primary ===
==== Candidates ====
===== Nominee =====
- Bonnie Watson Coleman, state assemblywoman and former chairwoman of the New Jersey Democratic Party

===== Eliminated in primary =====
- Upendra J. Chivukula, Deputy Speaker of the New Jersey General Assembly and nominee for New Jersey's 7th congressional district in 2012
- Linda R. Greenstein, state senator
- Andrew Zwicker, Princeton University plasma physicist

===== Declined =====
- Daniel R. Benson, state assemblyman
- Jun Choi, former mayor of Edison
- Paula Covello, Mercer County clerk
- Wayne DeAngelo, state assemblyman
- Jerry Green, Speaker Pro Tempore of the New Jersey General Assembly
- Reed Gusciora, state assemblyman
- Rush D. Holt, Jr., incumbent U.S. representative
- Brian M. Hughes, Mercer County Executive and nominee for New Jersey's 4th congressional district in 1992
- Colleen Mahr, Mayor of Fanwood
- Jim McGreevey, former governor
- Ed Potosnak, executive director of the New Jersey League of Conservation Voters and nominee for New Jersey's 7th congressional district in 2010
- Linda Stender, state assemblywoman and nominee for New Jersey's 7th congressional district in 2006 and 2008
- Shirley Turner, state senator

==== Polling ====
Poll source	Date(s) administered	Sample size	Margin of error	Upendra J. Chivukula	Linda R. Greenstein	Bonnie Watson Coleman	Andrew Zwicker	Undecided
Monmouth University	May 15–18, 2014	504	± 4.4%	11%	25%	24%	6%	34%
Garin-Hart-Yang (D-Watson-Coleman)	March 25–27, 2014	400	± 5%	7%	28%	27%	—	38%
Global Strategy Group (D-Greenstein)	February 28–March 3, 2014	401	± 4.9%	7%	30%	20%	—	43%

==== Results ====
Democratic primary results
Party	Candidate	Votes	%
Democratic	Bonnie Watson Coleman	15,413	42.9
Democratic	Linda Greenstein	10,031	27.9
Democratic	Upendra Chivukula	7,824	21.8
Democratic	Andrew Zwicker	2,648	7.4
Total votes		35,916	100.0

=== Republican primary ===
==== Candidates ====
===== Nominee =====
- Alieta Eck, former president of the Association of American Physicians and Surgeons, health care reform advocate and candidate for the U.S. Senate in 2013

===== Declined =====
- John Crowley, biotech executive and subject of the film Extraordinary Measures
- Andrew Sidamon-Eristoff, New Jersey State Treasurer, former member of the New York City Council and former New York State Commissioner of Tax and Finance
- Scott Sipprelle, venture capitalist and candidate for the seat in 2010

==== Results ====
Republican primary results
Party	Candidate	Votes	%
Republican	Alieta Eck	6,570	100.0
Total votes		6,570	100.0

=== General election ===
==== Endorsements ====
Bonnie Watson Coleman (D)

Labor unions

- AFL-CIO
- National Association of Letter Carriers
- National Education Association

Organizations

- EMILY's List
- Everytown for Gun Safety
- Human Rights Campaign
- League of Conservation Voters
- National Organization for Women
- Sierra Club

==== Predictions ====
Source	Ranking	As of
The Cook Political Report	Safe D	November 3, 2014
Rothenberg	Safe D	October 24, 2014
Sabato's Crystal Ball	Safe D	October 30, 2014
RCP	Safe D	November 2, 2014
Daily Kos Elections	Safe D	November 4, 2014

==== Results ====
New Jersey's 12th congressional district, 2014
Party	Candidate	Votes	%
Democratic	Bonnie Watson Coleman	90,430	60.9
Republican	Alieta Eck	54,168	36.5
Independent	Don Dezarn	1,330	0.9
Green	Steven Welzer	890	0.6
Independent	Kenneth J. Cody	567	0.4
Independent	Jack Freudenheim	531	0.4
Independent	Allen J. Cannon	450	0.3
Total votes		148,366	100.0
Democratic hold			

==== By county ====
County	Bonnie Watson Coleman Democratic		Alieta Eck Republican		Various candidates Other parties		Margin		Total votes cast
County	#	%	#	%	#	%	#	%	Total votes cast
Mercer (part)	38,168	69.0%	15,739	28.5%	1,404	2.5%	22,429	40.5%	55,311
Middlesex (part)	30,796	52.0%	28,917	45.5%	1,508	2.6%	3,879	6.5%	59,221
Somerset (part)	10,699	58.7%	7,006	38.4%	519	2.9%	3,693	20.3%	18,224
Union (part)	10,767	69.0%	4,506	28.9%	337	2.2%	6,261	40.1%	15,610
Totals	90,430	61.0%	54,168	36.5%	3,768	2.5%	36,262	24.5%	148,366

== See also ==
- 2014 United States House of Representatives elections
- 2014 United States elections
