= Garry Cobb =

American football player (born 1957)

No. 63, 53, 50, 59
- Position: Linebacker

Personal information
- Born: March 16, 1957 (age 69); Carthage, North Carolina, U.S.
- Listed height: 6 ft 2 in (1.88 m)
- Listed weight: 227 lb (103 kg)

Career information
- High school: Stamford (Stamford, Connecticut)
- College: USC
- NFL draft: 1979: 9th round, 247th overall pick

Career history
- Dallas Cowboys (1979)*; Detroit Lions (1979–1984); Philadelphia Eagles (1985–1987); Dallas Cowboys (1988–1989)
- * Offseason or practice squad member only

Awards and highlights
- National champion (1978)

Career NFL statistics
- Sacks: 26
- Interceptions: 10
- Fumble recoveries: 10
- Stats at Pro Football Reference

Garry Cobb

Personal details
- Party: Republican
- Spouse: Gwendolyn
- Children: 3
- Website: gcobb.com

Garry Wilbert Cobb (born March 16, 1957) is an American former professional football player who was a linebacker in the National Football League (NFL) for the Dallas Cowboys, Detroit Lions, and Philadelphia Eagles. He played college football for the USC Trojans. He is currently a Philadelphia Eagles analyst for Fox affiliate WTXF-TV and 94.1 WIP.

Cobb also got into politics for a short time, becoming the Republican nominee for New Jersey's 1st congressional district in the United States House of Representatives in 2014, ultimately losing that election to Donald Norcross.

== Early life ==
Cobb often tells amusing stories on the radio about how it was while his father and mother raised him and the other kids and growing up together with his siblings in North Carolina and Connecticut.

A 1975 graduate of Stamford High School in Stamford, Connecticut, he was a standout for the Black Knights and a two-sport All-American in baseball and football. He also lettered in basketball.

== College career ==
Cobb accepted a football scholarship from the University of Southern California to play for the USC Trojans football team. He played on two Rose Bowl championship teams and one National Championship team.

He played as an outside linebacker in his first three years. As a junior, he was second on the team in tackles. He was moved to defensive end as a senior and earned honorable-mention All-Pac-10 in 1978. He graduated in 1979 with a Bachelor of Science degree in Sociology.

He also practiced baseball as a center fielder for two years. After graduation, he was offered contracts by the California Angels and Chicago Cubs, but opted to play in the National Football League instead.

== Professional career ==
=== Dallas Cowboys (first stint) ===
Cobb was selected by the Dallas Cowboys in the ninth round (247th overall) of the 1979 NFL draft. He was waived on August 21.

=== Detroit Lions ===
On October 24, 1979, he signed as a free agent with the Detroit Lions. He played mainly on the special teams units during his first two years, until becoming a full-time starter at strongside linebacker in 1981, while recording 121 tackles (second on the team), 3 interceptions, 2.5 sacks and 2 fumble recoveries.

In 1982, he missed three games with a knee injury and finished with 33 tackles, 2 interceptions and 4 passes defensed. The next year, he registered 150 tackles (fourth on the team), 4 interceptions (tied for second on the team), 2 fumble recoveries, 3 forced fumbles and one sack. Cobb was a three-time defensive captain and also helped the Lions reach the playoffs in 1982 and 1983.

In 1984, he registered 128 tackles and 3 sacks. After holding out during the 1985 offseason, the Lions started discussing trading him to the Miami Dolphins for the rights to Anthony Carter. After the deal fell through, he was traded to the Philadelphia Eagles in exchange for the Eagles then all-time leading rusher Wilbert Montgomery, who was also in the middle of a contract dispute.

=== Philadelphia Eagles ===
In 1985, he registered 97 tackles and 5 sacks. In 1986, he posted 102 tackles, 6 sacks, one interception, 2 forced fumbles and one fumble recovery. He was named NFC Defensive Player of the Week after playing against the Atlanta Falcons in week five, he registered 9 tackles, 4 sacks (team record), a pass defensed, a forced fumble and a fumble recovery in a shutout win (16–0). He held the franchise single game sack record, until Clyde Simmons surpassed it with a 4.5 sack effort in 1991. He was released on August 22, 1988.

While with the Philadelphia Eagles, he started 39 of 44 games mostly at weakside linebacker. He was a teammate of quarterback Randall Cunningham and played in one of coach Buddy Ryan's most dominant defensive units which included Jerome Brown, Clyde Simmons, Seth Joyner and Hall of Famer Reggie White.

=== Dallas Cowboys (second stint) ===
On August 25, 1988, he signed with the Dallas Cowboys as a free agent, after they were experiencing several injuries at the linebacker position to players that included Jeff Rohrer, Mike Hegman, Ken Norton Jr., Jesse Penn and Jeff Hurd. He started 14 games at weakside linebacker, tallying 104 tackles (third on the team), one fumble recovery and tied with Danny Noonan for the team lead with 7.5 sacks. Against the New York Giants, he had 10 tackles, one sack, pass defensed and a forced fumble. The next game against the Atlanta Falcons, he recorded 10 tackles and 2.5 sacks.

In 1989, after experiencing problems with his left knee and missing most of the season, he was cut on December 18.

== Radio and TV career ==
After his retirement from football, Cobb transitioned to being a television and radio personality in the Philadelphia area. He has earned the nickname "G Cobb". His trademark radio show expression has become "G Cobb in the House!" In 1997 he became a sports reporter with CBS 3's Eyewitness News Team and remained for several years. Today, he is currently on local Fox affiliate WTXF-TV serving as Eagles analyst for its pregame and postgame shows. In July 2007, Cobb began writing Eagles columns for The Bulletin, a daily newspaper in Philadelphia

== Website publishing ==
Cobb is now the principal operator of a Philadelphia Eagles news and rumors website known as GCobb.com. The site claims that 100,000 fans visit and read from the website monthly. In a notable scoop, it was two hours prior to the official start of the 2008 NFL free agency period when Cobb's site reported correctly that cornerback Asante Samuel had already reached a deal with the Eagles.

== Run for Congress ==
In 2014, Cobb ran for the Republican nomination for New Jersey's 1st congressional district. He was initially recruited to potentially run in New Jersey's 3rd congressional district instead, which meant if he won, he could succeed another Republican and former Eagle, Jon Runyan, who was not running for re-election to the House. Cherry Hill, Cobb's town of residence, had previously been in the 3rd District until the redistricting following the 2010 Census, when it was moved to the more Democratic-leaning 1st district, and Cobb chose to run there instead. He won the Republican nomination and faced Democrat Donald Norcross, at the time a New Jersey State Senator, in the November general election. However, Norcross (D) (57.4%, 93,315 votes) ended up defeating Cobb (R) (39.4%, 64,073 votes).

== Personal life ==
Cobb resides in Cherry Hill, New Jersey with his wife Gwendolyn, whom he met while in college. They have three adult children together - two daughters, and a son, Garry Cobb II, who played cornerback at Stanford University (1998–2002). He is known for his interest in urban youth and was honored in 2002 by then-President George W. Bush for his work as a mentor to troubled youngsters. He is a former member of the Board of Caring People Alliance of Philadelphia, which operates the ELRC, 3 Boys & Girls Clubs, and Older Adults programming.

He is the author of a book entitled Don't Be Clueless: 7 Keys to Life in the Real World, which is targeted to the challenges of urban youth.
