= Aimee Belgard =

American lawyer and politician

New Jersey Superior Court Judge Burlington County (Vicinage 3)
- Incumbent
- Assumed office December 22, 2015

Freeholder of Burlington County, New Jersey
- In office January 1, 2013 – December 22, 2015
- Preceded by: Bruce Garganio and Mary Ann O'Brien
- Succeeded by: Kate Gibbs and Ryan Peters

Committeewoman of Edgewater Park, New Jersey
- In office January 2010 – January 1, 2013

Personal details
- Born: April 30, 1974 (age 52)
- Party: Democratic
- Spouse: Bill
- Children: 2
- Education: Stockton College; Widener University
- Profession: Judge

Aimee Belgard (born April 30, 1974), is an American lawyer and politician who serves as a judge in New Jersey Superior Court, she served as a Burlington County, New Jersey Freeholder from 2013 until 2016, losing her re-election bid in November 2015. Belgard is a member of the Democratic Party. Belgard was the unsuccessful Democratic nominee for Congress in New Jersey's 3rd congressional district, losing to Republican Tom MacArthur.

== Personal life and education ==
Belgard attended Haddonfield Memorial High School in Haddonfield, New Jersey. She earned a B.S. in Environmental Studies from Stockton University in 1996, and a J.D. from Widener University School of Law in 1999.

== Career ==
Belgard served as a member of the Edgewater Park Township Planning/Zoning Board for four years, before serving as an Edgewater Park Township Committeewoman from 2010 to 2013. She was elected to the Burlington County Board of Freeholders in 2012. She had unsuccessfully run for the same office in 2010. In 2015, Belgard lost her seat on the Freeholder Board after serving only one term.

Belgard spent 16 years as a trial and appellate lawyer for the law firm Sweeney and Sheehan. Additionally, she served on the board and as both vice president and president-elect of Board of the American Cancer Society, Eastern Division. She also served on the national board of the American Cancer Society Cancer Action Network and locally on the board of the YMCA.

== Personal life ==
Belgard lives in Edgewater Park Township, New Jersey with her husband, Bill, and two children.

== 2014 congressional campaign ==
Belgard was a congressional candidate for New Jersey's 3rd congressional district, seeking the seat that was being vacated by Republican Congressman Jon Runyan. Her opponent was Republican Tom MacArthur, a businessman and former mayor of Randolph. During the campaign, Stuart Rothenberg of Roll Call said the "district is competitive, though it leans slightly Republican" and will be a "serious fight."

Belgard was endorsed by the National Organization for Women, Sierra Club, League of Conservation Voters and EMILY's List, a political action committee that supports pro-choice Democratic candidates.

During the course of her campaign, Belgard defended the Affordable Care Act as well as President Obama's decision not to inform Congress about the release of five terrorists from Guantanamo Bay detention camp. Belgard supports the Affordable Care Act and opposes attempts to repeal it, but was criticized by WPHT talk show host Dom Giordano for "giving vague responses to complaints about the law." She has criticized President Obama for his position on Superstorm Sandy aid.

In February 2014, Nancy Pelosi hosted a fundraiser for Belgard. The Democratic Congressional Campaign Committee announced it would spend $1.3 million in ads supporting her campaign. One ad about her opponent's company, reported by Time, was described by Factcheck.org as deceptive, which the DCCC disputes.

Belgard was criticized by the MacArthur campaign for voting in favor of a tax increase on small businesses as an Edgewater Park Committeewoman, and was criticized for accepting a taxpayer-funded salary in spite of an old campaign video claiming she would not do so. Belgard was also attacked by the MacArthur campaign for "ducking" the issue of whether or not she supported in-state tuition for illegal aliens.

Belgard ultimately lost the election to MacArthur by an 11-point margin, narrowly winning the vote in Burlington County while losing the popular vote in Ocean County.

== Election history ==
Burlington County Freeholder Election Results, 2015
Party	Candidate	Votes	%
Republican	Kate Gibbs	31,939	25.76
Republican	Ryan Peters	31,839	25.68
Democratic	Aimee Belgard	30,268	24.41
Democratic	Joanne Schwartz	29,856	24.08

New Jersey's 3rd congressional district Election Results, 2014
Party	Candidate	Votes	%
Republican	Tom MacArthur	95,166	54.65
Democratic	Aimee Belgard	75,972	43.63

Burlington County Freeholder Election Results, 2012
Party	Candidate	Votes	%
Democratic	Aimee Belgard	100,403	26.23
Democratic	Joanne Schwartz	97,111	25.37
Republican	Bruce Garganio	91,854	23.99
Republican	Mary Ann O'Brien	91,305	23.85

Burlington County Freeholder Election Results, 2010
Party	Candidate	Votes	%
Republican	Joe Donnelly	69,067	51.96
Democratic	Aimee Belgard	63,776	47.98

Edgewater Park Township Committee Election Results, 2009
Party	Candidate	Votes	%
Democratic	Aimee Belgard	1,316	30.16
Democratic	John G. McElwee	1,284	29.43
Republican	Gregory J. Bouchard	876	20.08
Republican	Allan Ashinoff	886	20.31
