= Tom MacArthur =

American politician

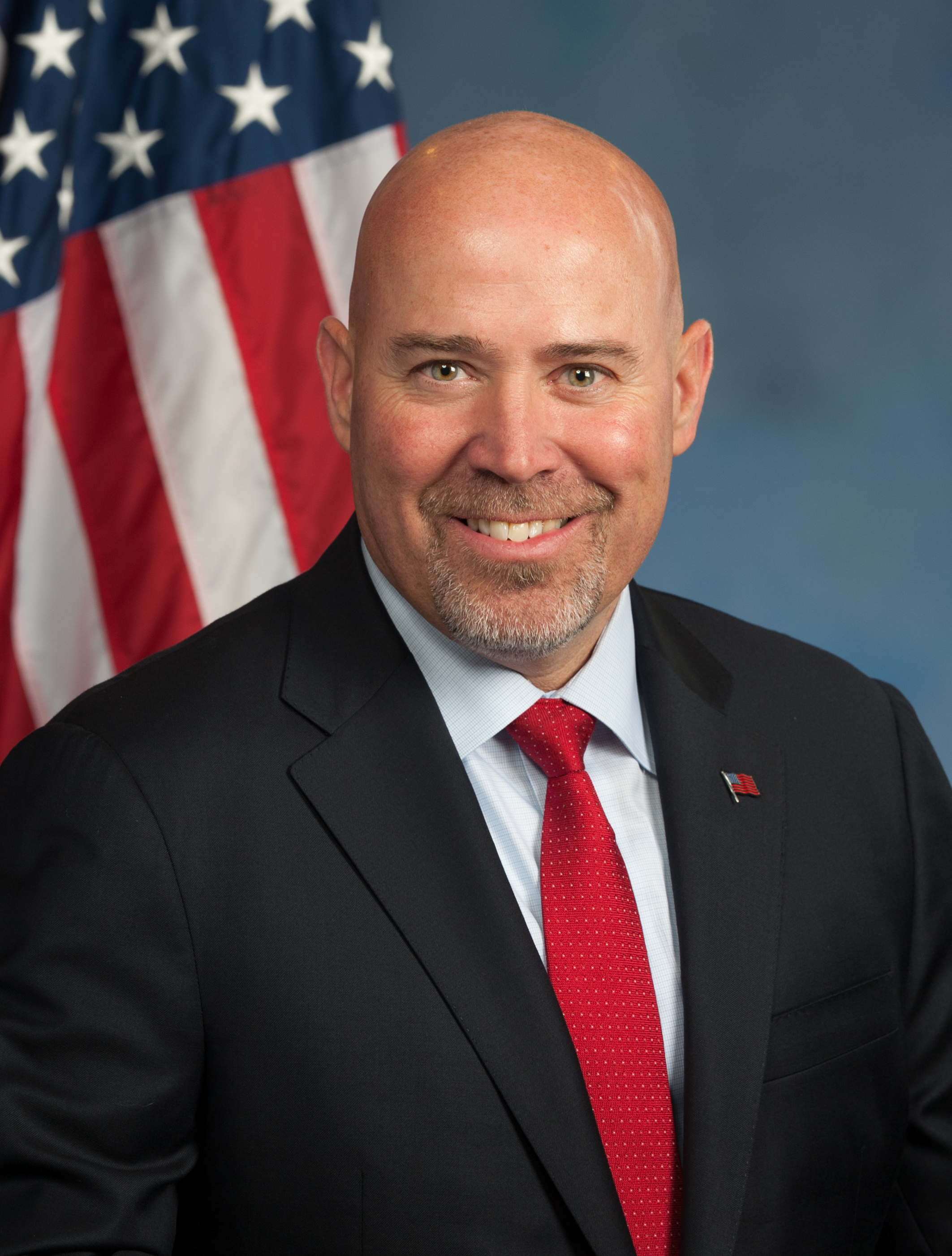
- Official portrait, 2015

Member of the U.S. House of Representatives from New Jersey's 3rd district
- In office January 3, 2015 – January 3, 2019
- Preceded by: Jon Runyan
- Succeeded by: Andy Kim

Mayor of Randolph
- In office January 1, 2013 – January 1, 2014
- Deputy: James Loveys
- Preceded by: Mike Guadagno
- Succeeded by: James Loveys

Personal details
- Born: Thomas Charles MacArthur; October 16, 1960 (age 66) Milford, Connecticut, U.S.
- Party: Republican
- Spouse: Debbie MacArthur (m. 1982)
- Children: 3
- Education: Hofstra University (BA)

Thomas Charles MacArthur (born October 16, 1960) is an American former insurance executive and politician. He served as the U.S. representative for New Jersey's 3rd congressional district from 2015 to 2019. A Republican, MacArthur served on the city council of Randolph, New Jersey, from 2011 through 2013, and as its mayor in 2013. He was elected to the U.S. House of Representatives in 2014. After leaving Congress MacArthur returned to private business.

== Early life, education, and career ==
MacArthur grew up in Hebron, Connecticut. He received his bachelor's degree from Hofstra University. After graduating from Hofstra, MacArthur became an insurance adjuster. He served as the chairman and CEO of York Risk Services Group, a multi-national organization that provides insurance services. He was chairman and chief executive officer of York Risk Services Group for 11 years. He served on the Randolph, New Jersey, Township Council from 2011 through 2013, including a tenure as mayor in 2013.

== U.S. House of Representatives ==
=== Elections ===
==== 2014 ====
When Jon Runyan, a Republican who represented New Jersey's 3rd congressional district in the United States House of Representatives, announced that he would not run for reelection in 2014, MacArthur chose to run for the Republican Party nomination. MacArthur resigned from the Randolph council to move into the congressional district, where he had owned a home. He ran against Steve Lonegan in the Republican Party's primary election, and defeated him.

MacArthur faced Democratic nominee Aimee Belgard, a Burlington County freeholder, in the general election. MacArthur's campaign expenditures totaled $5.6 million, with MacArthur personally contributing over $5 million to his campaign from his personal fortune. MacArthur outspent Belgard by about three to one (with both campaigns' spending equaling a combined total of $7.4 million), making the race the most expensive open-seat contest in the country in 2014. MacArthur defeated Belgard by nearly a 10-point margin.

He was sworn in on January 6, 2015, along with 58 other new members of the House of Representatives. He was assigned to the Armed Services Committee and two of its subcommittees, the Subcommittee on Tactical Air and Land Forces and Subcommittee on Military Personnel. MacArthur was elected Vice Chairman of the latter subcommittee. He was also assigned to the Natural Resources Committee as well as two of its subcommittees, the Subcommittee on Federal Lands and the Subcommittee on Water, Power, and Oceans.

On February 2, 2015, MacArthur introduced the "Disaster Assistance Fairness and Accountability Act of 2015" that will prevent the Federal Emergency Management Agency from taking back disaster relief funds from individuals who applied for them in good faith. On March 25, 2015, MacArthur introduced the "Veterans' Mental Health Care Access Act" to allow veterans with a Choice Card to access mental health care at any facility eligible for reimbursement by the Centers for Medicare and Medicaid Services. Both bills were considered "dead," by virtue of a failure to garner approval from Republican-led subcommittees, before the final sine die Adjournment of the 114th Congress. MacArthur's legislation to reform FEMA was re-introduced in the 115th Congress and became law.

==== 2016 ====
MacArthur ran for re-election in 2016. He ran unopposed in the Republican primary. In the general election, he faced Democrat Frederick John Lavergne. MacArthur won the election with 60% of the vote.

At his second term MacArthur was appointed to the Committee on Financial Services and stepped down from the Armed Services Committee and the Natural Resources Committee. He was also a member of the Republican Main Street Partnership and the Climate Solutions Caucus.

==== 2018 ====
MacArthur was defeated by Democrat Andy Kim, a former national security aide to President Obama, in the midterm election on November 6. The race was not officially called for eight days, after which Kim was declared the winner. With a margin of victory of fewer than 4,000 votes, or slightly over one percent of votes cast, this congressional race was the closest in New Jersey.

During the campaign, MacArthur emphasized his bipartisan record, willingness to oppose his own party, and his record of constituent service, while seeking to highlight Kim's apparent exaggeration of his resume and portray him as a "radical resistance" figure. Kim highlighted MacArthur's prominent role in the Republican efforts to repeal and replace the Affordable Care Act, while emphasizing his own experience in national security and his refusal to accept corporate PAC donations.

During the campaign, MacArthur sought to portray Kim as a D.C. elitist and outsider. In an ad run by the New Jersey Republican Party, Kim was described as "Real Fishy" in wonton font, a font that has been associated with expressing "Asianness," on a picture of dead fish. MacArthur dismissed charges that the ad was racist, "Some fish on a piece of paper is suddenly racist? What is racist about a picture of fish? Now we're politicizing fonts? It's not a racist font, it's a font meant to stand out." When MacArthur was accused of bigotry by U.S. Rep Adam Schiff in reference to another controversial ad that described Kim as "not one of us," MacArthur demanded an apology to his two adopted children, who are Korean American, and highlighted that the ad in question was not authorized by his campaign.

=== Committee assignments ===
115th Congress

- Committee on Financial Services
  - Subcommittee on Housing and Insurance
  - Subcommittee on Capital Markets, Securities, and Investments

114th Congress

- Committee on Armed Services
  - Subcommittee on Tactical Air and Land Forces
  - Subcommittee on Military Personnel (Vice Chair)
- Committee on Natural Resources
  - Subcommittee on Federal Lands
  - Subcommittee on Water, Power, and Oceans

=== Caucus and leadership positions ===
MacArthur was elected or assigned to several leadership roles during his tenure, including Co-Chair of the Tuesday Group (a group of moderate or centrist Republicans), Co-Chair of the Bipartisan Heroin and Opioid Taskforce, and Commissioner of the Puerto Rico Growth Commission. MacArthur also was a member of the Board of Directors of the National Republican Campaign Committee, and Trustee of the Kennedy Center of the Performing Arts.

== Political positions ==
MacArthur was ranked as the 15th most bipartisan member of the U.S. House of Representatives during the 115th Congress and the 44th most bipartisan in the 114th United States Congress in the Lugar Center – Georgetown University McCourt School of Public Policy Bipartisan Index. As of October 2018, MacArthur had voted with his party in 89.3% of votes in the 115th United States Congress. As of October 2018, FiveThirtyEight found that MacArthur had voted in line with President Trump's position 94.6% of the time. As of September 2018, he had voted in line with President Trump's position more than any other member of Congress from the state of New Jersey.

=== Economic issues ===
MacArthur was the only member of Congress from the New Jersey congressional delegation to vote yes for the federal Tax Cuts and Jobs Act of 2017; other lawmakers harshly criticized the adverse impact of the bill on New Jersey taxpayers. The tax plan would lead to an aggregate tax cut in most states, but has stirred controversy in New Jersey due to the decrease in the State and Local Tax (SALT) deduction to $10,000, which means that the bill raises taxes on many New Jersey citizens. MacArthur explained his vote by asserting that "nearly all taxpayers" in his district do not need SALT deductions above $10,000, and citing his efforts to restore the deduction to $10,000 after prior versions of the bill eliminated it entirely. When asked to elaborate by the Washington Post fact-checker, MacArthur said that 93% of his constituents did not pay SALT higher than $10,000 and shared his team's calculations with the Washington Post. The Washington Post fact-checker gave MacArthur "Two Pinocchios", writing that "even that accounting ignores the interaction of the property tax provision with other parts of the tax bill, so even people who would benefit from the cap still might find themselves with an increase in taxes. MacArthur appears to have worked diligently to tilt the bill so that it would benefit his constituents, but he oversells his achievement."

MacArthur was the only member of the New Jersey congressional delegation to vote in favor of a bill that funded farm subsidies for five additional years while imposing work requirements and new restrictions on food stamp usage. According to NJ.com, the bill, which did not pass, would have cost 35,000 New Jersey residents their access to food stamps. According to Vote Smart's 2016 analysis, MacArthur generally opposes allowing individuals to divert a portion of their Social Security taxes into personal retirement accounts.

=== Environment ===
MacArthur introduced legislation to combat pollution in Barnegat Bay and cosponsored legislation to reauthorize the National Estuaries Program. The League of Conservation Voters has given him a lifetime score of 10%. MacArthur opposes the Trump administration's proposal to open New Jersey's waters to offshore oil and gas drilling. According to Vote Smart's 2016 analysis, MacArthur generally supports the building of the Keystone Pipeline, supports government funding for the development of renewable energy, and opposes the federal regulation of greenhouse gas emissions.

=== Gun policy ===
MacArthur had described himself as a supporter of the Second Amendment and was endorsed by the NRA Political Victory Fund with a 93% ("AQ") rating.

=== Healthcare ===
MacArthur became a key player in efforts to repeal and replace the Affordable Care Act, citing the loss of his first child and his own background in insurance as motivating factors. Then-candidate Andy Kim cited MacArthur involvement as a motivating factor for his own run against MacArthur, and healthcare became a dominant theme in the campaign. MacArthur has repeatedly called for repealing the Affordable Care Act and helped craft legislation for its repeal. However, in January 2017, he was one of nine Republicans who voted no on its repeal.

On March 20, 2017, MacArthur announced his support for the American Health Care Act of 2017.

On April 25, 2017, MacArthur introduced an amendment to the Act which became known as the MacArthur Amendment. It permits states to waive out of Obamacare's ban on pre-existing conditions, allowing insurers to charge sick people higher premiums than healthy people. It also dictates that health insurance offered to members of Congress and their staffs not be included in the exemption from covering pre-existing conditions. A Washington Post-ABC News poll conducted in April 2017, found that 70 per cent of Americans favored protections for pre-existing conditions.

In response to MacArthur's vote to pass the AHCA, which would partially repeal and replace Obamacare, there were protests in his district, and MacArthur held town halls where some constituents questioned MacArthur about his vote.

MacArthur resigned as chair of the Tuesday Group in May 2017 due to disagreements among its members over the AHCA.

The repeal effort was defeated in the Senate in a narrow vote where Republican senators Susan Collins, Lisa Murkowski, and John McCain joined with all Senate Democrats in voting against it.

=== LGBT rights ===
MacArthur's 2014 campaign website stated that he believes marriage is "between one man and one woman," and that questions of marriage should be resolved at the state level. It would appear later versions of MacArthur's campaign website did not contain this language. MacArthur led a bipartisan effort to include sexual orientation and gender identity in the 2020 Census, and opposed the Trump Administration's efforts to ban transgender persons from military service. Garden State Equality, a New Jersey LGBT advocacy organization, endorsed MacArthur for re-election in 2016. In 2018 Garden State Equality stated that MacArthur was "one of the most pro-LGBTQ Republicans in the nation and has proven a steadfast ally to the LGBTQ community," though the organization withheld an endorsement in the race due to differences with MacArthur over healthcare policy.

== Personal life ==
MacArthur lives in Toms River, New Jersey, and also owns homes in Randolph and Barnegat Light, New Jersey. He is married to his wife Debbie and has two children, a son and daughter, both adopted. Their first child, Gracie, was born with special needs and died in 1996 at the age of 11.

MacArthur and his wife, Debbie, have been active in charity work. Since 2005 they have operated In God's Hands Charitable Foundation, a private grantmaking foundation, in memory of their late daughter. The charity's tax returns show funding for a variety of programs, including support for people with disabilities, veterans, orphans, prison inmates and their families, and people affected by natural disasters, hunger, and homelessness.

During his time in office, MacArthur was the wealthiest member of New Jersey's congressional delegation, with minimum reported assets worth about $31.8 million as of July 2017. Other sources place his net worth at almost $53 million.

MacArthur is an Episcopalian.

MacArthur owns and operates multiple businesses in the marina and hospitality sectors, including the Bayview Harbor marina and the affiliated Sandcastle Luxury Bed and Breakfast, both in Barnegat Light, NJ, and a yacht holding company which operates a vacation rental and charter yacht.

== Electoral history ==
Randolph Town Council election results, 2010
Party	Candidate	Votes	%
Republican	Tom MacArthur	4,650	22.38
Republican	James Loveys	4,612	22.20
Republican	Michael Guadagno	4,522	21.76
Republican	Allen Napoliello	4,317	20.78
Democratic	Nancie Ludwig	2,672	12.86

2014 New Jersey's 3rd congressional district Republican primary election
Party	Candidate	Votes	%	±%
Republican	Tom MacArthur	15,908	59.7	
Republican	Steve Lonegan	10,643	40.3	
Turnout		26,551	100.0	

2014 New Jersey's 3rd congressional district election
Party	Candidate	Votes	%	±%
Republican	Tom MacArthur	100,471	53.76	
Democratic	Aimee Belgard	82,537	44.09	
D-R Party	Frederick John Lavergne	3,095	1.61	
Turnout		186,103	100.0	

2016 New Jersey's 3rd congressional district election
Party	Candidate	Votes	%	±%
Republican	Tom MacArthur	194,596	59.31	
Democratic	Frederick John LaVergne	127,526	38.87	
Constitution Party	Lawrence Bolinski	5,938	1.81	
Turnout		328,060	100.0	

2018 New Jersey's 3rd congressional district election
Party	Candidate	Votes	%	±%
Democratic	Andy Kim	153,473	50.0	
Republican	Tom MacArthur	149,500	48.7	
Constitution Party	Lawrence Bolinski	3,902	1.3	
Turnout		306,875	100.0	

U.S. House of Representatives
Preceded by Jon Runyan	Member of the U.S. House of Representatives from New Jersey's 3rd congressional district 2015–2019	Succeeded by Andy Kim
Party political offices
Preceded by Charlie Dent; Bob Dold; Adam Kinzinger	Chair of the Tuesday Group; 2017; Served alongside: Charlie Dent, Elise Stefanik	Succeeded by John Katko
U.S. order of precedence (ceremonial)
Preceded by Jon Runyan Sr. as Former U.S. Representative	Order of precedence of the United States as Former U.S. Representative	Succeeded by Tom Malinowski as Former U.S. Representative
