= New Jersey's 3rd congressional district =

U.S. House district for New Jersey

- Interactive map of district boundaries since January 3, 2023
- Representative: Herb Conaway; D–Delran
- Distribution: 95.73% urban; 4.27% rural
- Population (2025): 803,635
- Median household income: $115,140
- Ethnicity: 63.3% White; 12.3% Black; 11.3% Hispanic; 8.5% Asian; 3.9% Two or more races; 0.7% other
- Cook PVI: D+5

New Jersey's 3rd congressional district is a congressional district in southern and central New Jersey. It encompasses suburbs of New York City and Philadelphia in Burlington County and portions of Mercer and Monmouth Counties.

Centered on the I-95 corridor and New Jersey Turnpike, the district is represented by Democrat Herb Conaway of Delran, who succeeded now-senator Andy Kim in 2025.

The district's boundaries were redrawn in 2020 to favor the incumbent. Heavily Republican Ocean County was removed and replaced by several towns in heavily Democratic Burlington, Mercer, Monmouth Counties.

== Counties and municipalities in the district ==
For the 118th and successive Congresses (based on redistricting following the 2020 census), the district contains all or portions of three counties and 53 municipalities.

Burlington County (38):

Bass River Township, Beverly, Bordentown, Bordentown Township, Burlington, Burlington Township, Chesterfield Township, Cinnaminson Township, Delanco Township, Delran Township, Eastampton Township, Edgewater Park, Evesham Township, Fieldsboro, Florence Township, Hainesport Township, Lumberton, Mansfield Township, Medford Lakes, Medford, Moorestown, Mount Holly, Mount Laurel, New Hanover Township, North Hanover Township, Pemberton Borough, Pemberton Township, Riverside Township, Riverton, Shamong Township, Southampton Township, Springfield Township, Tabernacle Township, Washington Township, Westampton, Willingboro Township, Woodland Township, Wrightstown

Mercer County (5):

East Windsor, Hamilton Township, Hightstown, Lawrence Township, Robbinsville Township

Monmouth County (10):

Allentown, Englishtown, Freehold Borough, Freehold Township (part; also 4th; includes East Freehold and West Freehold), Holmdel Township, Manalapan Township, Marlboro Township, Millstone Township, Roosevelt, Upper Freehold Township

== Recent election results from statewide races ==
Year	Office	Results
2008	President	Obama 56% - 43%
2012	President	Obama 56% - 44%
2016	President	Clinton 53% - 44%
2017	Governor	Murphy 53% - 45%
2018	Senate	Menendez 51% - 46%
2020	President	Biden 56% - 42%
2020	Senate	Booker 56% - 43%
2021	Governor	Murphy 51% - 49%
2024	President	Harris 53% - 45%
2024	Senate	Kim 56% - 42%
2025	Governor	Sherrill 57% - 42%

== List of members representing the district ==
=== 1799–1801: one seat ===
Member (District home)	Party	Years	Cong ress	Electoral history	Counties/towns
District organized from New Jersey's at-large congressional district in 1799
James Linn (Trenton)	Democratic-Republican	March 4, 1799 – March 3, 1801	6th	Elected in 1798. Retired.	Hunterdon and Somerset Counties
District organized to New Jersey's at-large congressional district in 1801

=== 1813–1815: two seats ===
From 1813 to 1815, two seats were apportioned, elected at-large on a general ticket. This district was organized from New Jersey's at-large congressional district.

Years	Cong ress	Seat A			Seat B			District location
Years	Cong ress	Member (District home)	Party	Electoral history	Member (District home)	Party	Electoral history	District location
March 4, 1813 – May 20, 1814	13th	William Coxe Jr. (Burlington)	Federalist	Elected in 1813. Retired.	Jacob Hufty (Salem)	Federalist	Redistricted from the at-large district and re-elected in 1813. Died.	Burlington, Cape May, Cumberland, Gloucester, and Salem Counties
May 20, 1814 – November 2, 1814	13th	William Coxe Jr. (Burlington)	Federalist	Elected in 1813. Retired.	Vacant			Burlington, Cape May, Cumberland, Gloucester, and Salem Counties
November 2, 1814 – March 3, 1815	13th	William Coxe Jr. (Burlington)	Federalist	Elected in 1813. Retired.	Thomas Bines (Pennsville)	Democratic-Republican	Elected to finish Hufty's term. Retired.	Burlington, Cape May, Cumberland, Gloucester, and Salem Counties

District organized to New Jersey's at-large congressional district in 1815

=== 1843–present: one seat ===
Member (District home)	Party	Years	Cong ress	Electoral history	Counties/towns
District re-established March 4, 1843
Isaac G. Farlee (Flemington)	Democratic	March 4, 1843 – March 3, 1845	28th	Elected in 1842. Lost re-election.	1843–1845: Hunterdon, Sussex, and Warren
John Runk (Kingwood)	Whig	March 4, 1845 – March 3, 1847	29th	Elected in 1844. Lost re-election.	1845–1847: Hunterdon, Mercer, Middlesex, and Somerset
Joseph E. Edsall (Hamburg)	Democratic	March 4, 1847 – March 3, 1849	30th	Redistricted from the 4th district and re-elected in 1846. Retired.	1847–1853: Hunterdon, Sussex, and Warren
Isaac Wildrick (Blairstown)	Democratic	March 4, 1849 – March 3, 1853	31st 32nd	Elected in 1848. Re-elected in 1850. Retired.	1847–1853: Hunterdon, Sussex, and Warren
Samuel Lilly (Lambertville)	Democratic	March 4, 1853 – March 3, 1855	33rd	Elected in 1852. Retired.	1853–1863: Hunterdon, Middlesex, Somerset, and Warren
James Bishop (New Brunswick)	Opposition	March 4, 1855 – March 3, 1857	34th	Elected in 1854. Lost re-election.	1853–1863: Hunterdon, Middlesex, Somerset, and Warren
Garnett Adrain (New Brunswick)	Democratic	March 4, 1857 – March 3, 1859	35th 36th	Elected in 1856. Re-elected in 1858. Retired.	1853–1863: Hunterdon, Middlesex, Somerset, and Warren
Garnett Adrain (New Brunswick)	Anti-Lecompton Democratic	March 4, 1859 – March 3, 1861	35th 36th	Elected in 1856. Re-elected in 1858. Retired.	1853–1863: Hunterdon, Middlesex, Somerset, and Warren
William G. Steele (Somerville)	Democratic	March 4, 1861 – March 3, 1865	37th 38th	Elected in 1860. Re-elected in 1862. Retired.	1853–1863: Hunterdon, Middlesex, Somerset, and Warren
William G. Steele (Somerville)	Democratic	March 4, 1861 – March 3, 1865	37th 38th	Elected in 1860. Re-elected in 1862. Retired.	1863–1873: Hunterdon, Middlesex, Somerset, Union, and Warren
Charles Sitgreaves (Phillipsburg)	Democratic	March 4, 1865 – March 3, 1869	39th 40th	Elected in 1864. Re-elected in 1866. Retired.	1863–1873: Hunterdon, Middlesex, Somerset, Union, and Warren
John T. Bird (Flemington)	Democratic	March 4, 1869 – March 3, 1873	41st 42nd	Elected in 1868. Re-elected in 1870. Retired.	1863–1873: Hunterdon, Middlesex, Somerset, Union, and Warren
Amos Clark Jr. (Elizabeth)	Republican	March 4, 1873 – March 3, 1875	43rd	Elected in 1872. Lost re-election.	1873–1893: Middlesex, Monmouth, and Union
Miles Ross (New Brunswick)	Democratic	March 4, 1875 – March 3, 1883	44th 45th 46th 47th	Elected in 1874. Re-elected in 1876. Re-elected in 1878. Re-elected in 1880. Lost re-election.	1873–1893: Middlesex, Monmouth, and Union
John Kean (Elizabeth)	Republican	March 4, 1883 – March 3, 1885	48th	Elected in 1882. Lost re-election.	1873–1893: Middlesex, Monmouth, and Union
Robert S. Green (Elizabeth)	Democratic	March 4, 1885 – January 17, 1887	49th	Elected in 1884. Retired to run for governor and resigned when elected.	1873–1893: Middlesex, Monmouth, and Union
Vacant		January 17, 1887 – March 3, 1887	49th		1873–1893: Middlesex, Monmouth, and Union
John Kean (Elizabeth)	Republican	March 4, 1887 – March 3, 1889	50th	Elected in 1886. Lost re-election.	1873–1893: Middlesex, Monmouth, and Union
Jacob A. Geissenhainer (Freehold)	Democratic	March 4, 1889 – March 3, 1895	51st 52nd 53rd	Elected in 1888. Re-elected in 1890. Re-elected in 1892. Lost re-election.	1873–1893: Middlesex, Monmouth, and Union
Jacob A. Geissenhainer (Freehold)	Democratic	March 4, 1889 – March 3, 1895	51st 52nd 53rd	Elected in 1888. Re-elected in 1890. Re-elected in 1892. Lost re-election.	1893–1903: Middlesex, Monmouth, and Somerset
Benjamin F. Howell (New Brunswick)	Republican	March 4, 1895 – March 3, 1911	54th 55th 56th 57th 58th 59th 60th 61st	Elected in 1894. Re-elected in 1896. Re-elected in 1898. Re-elected in 1900. Re-elected in 1902. Re-elected in 1904. Re-elected in 1906. Re-elected in 1908. Lost re-election.	1893–1903: Middlesex, Monmouth, and Somerset
Benjamin F. Howell (New Brunswick)	Republican	March 4, 1895 – March 3, 1911	54th 55th 56th 57th 58th 59th 60th 61st	Elected in 1894. Re-elected in 1896. Re-elected in 1898. Re-elected in 1900. Re-elected in 1902. Re-elected in 1904. Re-elected in 1906. Re-elected in 1908. Lost re-election.	1903–1933: Middlesex, Monmouth, and Ocean
Thomas J. Scully (South Amboy)	Democratic	March 4, 1911 – March 3, 1921	62nd 63rd 64th 65th 66th	Elected in 1910. Re-elected in 1912. Re-elected in 1914. Re-elected in 1916. Re-elected in 1918. Retired.	1903–1933: Middlesex, Monmouth, and Ocean
T. Frank Appleby (Asbury Park)	Republican	March 4, 1921 – March 3, 1923	67th	Elected in 1920. Lost re-election.	1903–1933: Middlesex, Monmouth, and Ocean
Elmer H. Geran (Matawan)	Democratic	March 4, 1923 – March 3, 1925	68th	Elected in 1922. Lost re-election.	1903–1933: Middlesex, Monmouth, and Ocean
Vacant		March 3, 1925 – November 3, 1925	69th	Member-elect (and former member) T. Frank Appleby died December 15, 1924.	1903–1933: Middlesex, Monmouth, and Ocean
Stewart H. Appleby (Asbury Park)	Republican	November 3, 1925 – March 3, 1927	69th	Elected to finish his father's term. Retired.	1903–1933: Middlesex, Monmouth, and Ocean
Harold G. Hoffman (South Amboy)	Republican	March 4, 1927 – March 3, 1931	70th 71st	Elected in 1926. Re-elected in 1928. Retired to become Motor Vehicle Commissioner of New Jersey.	1903–1933: Middlesex, Monmouth, and Ocean
William H. Sutphin (Matawan)	Democratic	March 4, 1931 – January 3, 1943	72nd 73rd 74th 75th 76th 77th	Elected in 1930. Re-elected in 1932. Re-elected in 1934. Re-elected in 1936. Re-elected in 1938. Re-elected in 1940. Lost re-election.	1903–1933: Middlesex, Monmouth, and Ocean
William H. Sutphin (Matawan)	Democratic	March 4, 1931 – January 3, 1943	72nd 73rd 74th 75th 76th 77th	Elected in 1930. Re-elected in 1932. Re-elected in 1934. Re-elected in 1936. Re-elected in 1938. Re-elected in 1940. Lost re-election.	1933–1943: Monmouth, Ocean, and Parts of Middlesex (south of Raritan River)
James C. Auchincloss (Rumson)	Republican	January 3, 1943 – January 3, 1965	78th 79th 80th 81st 82nd 83rd 84th 85th 86th 87th 88th	Elected in 1942. Re-elected in 1944. Re-elected in 1946. Re-elected in 1948. Re-elected in 1950. Re-elected in 1952. Re-elected in 1954. Re-elected in 1956. Re-elected in 1958. Re-elected in 1960. Re-elected in 1962. Retired.	1943–1963: [data missing]
James C. Auchincloss (Rumson)	Republican	January 3, 1943 – January 3, 1965	78th 79th 80th 81st 82nd 83rd 84th 85th 86th 87th 88th	Elected in 1942. Re-elected in 1944. Re-elected in 1946. Re-elected in 1948. Re-elected in 1950. Re-elected in 1952. Re-elected in 1954. Re-elected in 1956. Re-elected in 1958. Re-elected in 1960. Re-elected in 1962. Retired.	1963–1965; Monmouth and Ocean (Note: Remainder of Middlesex County was moved to the new 15th district in 1962.)
James J. Howard (Spring Lake Heights)	Democratic	January 3, 1965 – March 25, 1988	89th 90th 91st 92nd 93rd 94th 95th 96th 97th 98th 99th 100th	Elected in 1964. Re-elected in 1966. Re-elected in 1968. Re-elected in 1970. Re-elected in 1972. Re-elected in 1974. Re-elected in 1976. Re-elected in 1978. Re-elected in 1980. Re-elected in 1982. Re-elected in 1984. Re-elected in 1986. Died.	1963–1965; Monmouth and Ocean
James J. Howard (Spring Lake Heights)	Democratic	January 3, 1965 – March 25, 1988	89th 90th 91st 92nd 93rd 94th 95th 96th 97th 98th 99th 100th	Elected in 1964. Re-elected in 1966. Re-elected in 1968. Re-elected in 1970. Re-elected in 1972. Re-elected in 1974. Re-elected in 1976. Re-elected in 1978. Re-elected in 1980. Re-elected in 1982. Re-elected in 1984. Re-elected in 1986. Died.	1967–1969: Monmouth, Parts of Middlesex (Sayreville, South Amboy, and Old Bridge Township), and Parts of Ocean (Jackson Township, Lakewood Township, and Plumsted Township)
James J. Howard (Spring Lake Heights)	Democratic	January 3, 1965 – March 25, 1988	89th 90th 91st 92nd 93rd 94th 95th 96th 97th 98th 99th 100th	Elected in 1964. Re-elected in 1966. Re-elected in 1968. Re-elected in 1970. Re-elected in 1972. Re-elected in 1974. Re-elected in 1976. Re-elected in 1978. Re-elected in 1980. Re-elected in 1982. Re-elected in 1984. Re-elected in 1986. Died.	1969–1973: Monmouth, Parts of Middlesex (Old Bridge Township), and Parts of Ocean (Jackson Township, Lakewood Township, and Plumsted Township)
James J. Howard (Spring Lake Heights)	Democratic	January 3, 1965 – March 25, 1988	89th 90th 91st 92nd 93rd 94th 95th 96th 97th 98th 99th 100th	Elected in 1964. Re-elected in 1966. Re-elected in 1968. Re-elected in 1970. Re-elected in 1972. Re-elected in 1974. Re-elected in 1976. Re-elected in 1978. Re-elected in 1980. Re-elected in 1982. Re-elected in 1984. Re-elected in 1986. Died.	1973–1975: [data missing]
James J. Howard (Spring Lake Heights)	Democratic	January 3, 1965 – March 25, 1988	89th 90th 91st 92nd 93rd 94th 95th 96th 97th 98th 99th 100th	Elected in 1964. Re-elected in 1966. Re-elected in 1968. Re-elected in 1970. Re-elected in 1972. Re-elected in 1974. Re-elected in 1976. Re-elected in 1978. Re-elected in 1980. Re-elected in 1982. Re-elected in 1984. Re-elected in 1986. Died.	1975–1983: Monmouth (excluding Aberdeen Township, Allentown, Roosevelt, and Upper Freehold Township) and parts of Ocean (Lakewood Township, Point Pleasant, and Point Pleasant Beach)
James J. Howard (Spring Lake Heights)	Democratic	January 3, 1965 – March 25, 1988	89th 90th 91st 92nd 93rd 94th 95th 96th 97th 98th 99th 100th	Elected in 1964. Re-elected in 1966. Re-elected in 1968. Re-elected in 1970. Re-elected in 1972. Re-elected in 1974. Re-elected in 1976. Re-elected in 1978. Re-elected in 1980. Re-elected in 1982. Re-elected in 1984. Re-elected in 1986. Died.	1983–?: Parts of Middlesex, Monmouth, and Ocean
James J. Howard (Spring Lake Heights)	Democratic	January 3, 1965 – March 25, 1988	89th 90th 91st 92nd 93rd 94th 95th 96th 97th 98th 99th 100th	Elected in 1964. Re-elected in 1966. Re-elected in 1968. Re-elected in 1970. Re-elected in 1972. Re-elected in 1974. Re-elected in 1976. Re-elected in 1978. Re-elected in 1980. Re-elected in 1982. Re-elected in 1984. Re-elected in 1986. Died.	?–1993: Coastal areas of Monmouth and Ocean
Vacant		March 25, 1988 – November 8, 1988	100th		?–1993: Coastal areas of Monmouth and Ocean
Frank Pallone (Long Branch)	Democratic	November 8, 1988 – January 3, 1993	100th 101st 102nd	Elected to finish Howard's term. Elected to full term in 1988. Re-elected in 1990. Redistricted to the 6th district.	?–1993: Coastal areas of Monmouth and Ocean
Jim Saxton (Mount Holly)	Republican	January 3, 1993 – January 3, 2009	103rd 104th 105th 106th 107th 108th 109th 110th	Redistricted from the 13th district and re-elected in 1992. Elected in 1994. Re-elected in 1996. Re-elected in 1998. Re-elected in 2000. Re-elected in 2002. Re-elected in 2004. Re-elected in 2006. Retired.	1993–2003: Parts of Camden, Burlington, and Ocean
Jim Saxton (Mount Holly)	Republican	January 3, 1993 – January 3, 2009	103rd 104th 105th 106th 107th 108th 109th 110th	Redistricted from the 13th district and re-elected in 1992. Elected in 1994. Re-elected in 1996. Re-elected in 1998. Re-elected in 2000. Re-elected in 2002. Re-elected in 2004. Re-elected in 2006. Retired.	2003–2013: Parts of Camden, Burlington, and Ocean
John Adler (Cherry Hill)	Democratic	January 3, 2009 – January 3, 2011	111th	Elected in 2008. Lost re-election.	2003–2013: Parts of Camden, Burlington, and Ocean
Jon Runyan (Mount Laurel)	Republican	January 3, 2011 – January 3, 2015	112th 113th	Elected in 2010. Re-elected in 2012. Retired.	2003–2013: Parts of Camden, Burlington, and Ocean
Jon Runyan (Mount Laurel)	Republican	January 3, 2011 – January 3, 2015	112th 113th	Elected in 2010. Re-elected in 2012. Retired.	2013–2023: Parts of Burlington and Ocean
Tom MacArthur (Toms River)	Republican	January 3, 2015 – January 3, 2019	114th 115th	Elected in 2014. Re-elected in 2016. Lost re-election.	2013–2023: Parts of Burlington and Ocean
Andy Kim (Moorestown)	Democratic	January 3, 2019 – December 8, 2024	116th 117th 118th	Elected in 2018. Re-elected in 2020. Re-elected in 2022. Resigned after being elected and appointed as U.S. Senator.	2013–2023: Parts of Burlington and Ocean
Andy Kim (Moorestown)	Democratic	January 3, 2019 – December 8, 2024	116th 117th 118th	Elected in 2018. Re-elected in 2020. Re-elected in 2022. Resigned after being elected and appointed as U.S. Senator.	2023–present: Parts of Burlington, Mercer, and Monmouth
Vacant		December 8, 2024 – January 3, 2025	118th		2023–present: Parts of Burlington, Mercer, and Monmouth
Herb Conaway (Delran Township)	Democratic	January 3, 2025 – present	119th	Elected in 2024. Re-elected in 2026.	2023–present: Parts of Burlington, Mercer, and Monmouth

== Recent election results ==
=== 2012 ===
New Jersey's 3rd congressional district, 2012
Party	Candidate	Votes	%
Republican	Jon Runyan (incumbent)	174,253	53.7
Democratic	Shelley Adler	145,509	44.9
Independent	Robert Forchion	1,965	0.6
Independent	Robert Shapiro	1,104	0.3
Independent	Frederick John Lavergne	770	0.2
Independent	Robert Witterschein	530	0.2
Independent	Christopher Dennick	280	0.1
Total votes		324,411	100.0
Republican hold			

=== 2014 ===
New Jersey's 3rd congressional district, 2014
Party	Candidate	Votes	%
Republican	Tom MacArthur	100,471	54.0
Democratic	Aimee Belgard	82,537	44.3
Independent	Frederick John Lavergne	3,095	1.7
Total votes		186,103	100.0
Republican hold			

=== 2016 ===
New Jersey's 3rd congressional district, 2016
Party	Candidate	Votes	%
Republican	Tom MacArthur (incumbent)	194,596	59.3
Democratic	Frederick John Lavergne	127,526	38.9
Constitution	Lawrence W. Berlinski Jr.	5,938	1.8
Total votes		328,060	100.0
Republican hold			

=== 2018 ===
New Jersey's 3rd congressional district, 2018
Party	Candidate	Votes	%
Democratic	Andy Kim	153,473	50.0
Republican	Tom MacArthur (incumbent)	149,500	48.7
Constitution	Larry Berlinski	3,902	1.3
Total votes		306,875	100.0
Democratic gain from Republican			

=== 2020 ===
New Jersey's 3rd congressional district, 2020
Party	Candidate	Votes	%
Democratic	Andy Kim (incumbent)	229,840	53.2
Republican	David Richter	196,327	45.5
Independent	Martin Weber	3,724	0.9
Independent	Robert Shapiro	1,871	0.4
Total votes		431,762	100.0
Democratic hold			

=== 2022 ===
New Jersey's 3rd congressional district, 2022
Party	Candidate	Votes	%
Democratic	Andy Kim (incumbent)	150,498	55.5
Republican	Bob Healey	118,415	43.6
Libertarian	Christopher Russomanno	1,347	0.5
Independent	Gregory Sobocinski	1,116	0.4
Total votes		271,376	100.0
Democratic hold			

=== 2024 ===
2024 New Jersey's 3rd congressional district election
Party	Candidate	Votes	%
Democratic	Herb Conaway	202,034	53.2
Republican	Rajesh Mohan	169,454	44.7
Green	Steven Welzer	3,478	0.9
Libertarian	Chris Russomanno	1,951	0.5
Independent	Douglas Wynn	1,332	0.4
Independent	Justin Barbera	1,235	0.3
Total votes		379,484	100.0
Democratic hold			
