= Jon Runyan =

American athlete and politician (born 1973)

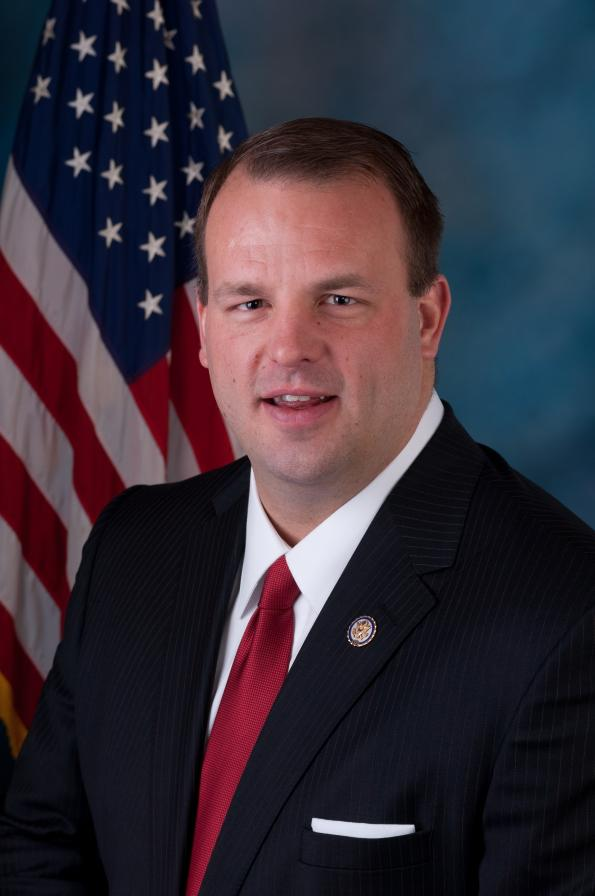
- Runyan in 2011

Member of the U.S. House of Representatives from New Jersey's 3rd district
- In office January 3, 2011 – January 3, 2015
- Preceded by: John Adler
- Succeeded by: Tom MacArthur

Personal details
- Born: Jon Daniel Runyan; November 27, 1973 (age 52) Flint, Michigan, U.S.
- Party: Republican
- Spouse: Divorced
- Children: 3, including Jon
- Education: University of Michigan; Thomas Edison State University (BA); University of Pennsylvania
- Website: House website (archived)
- Football career

No. 69, 79
- Position: Offensive tackle

Personal information
- Listed height: 6 ft 7 in (2.01 m)
- Listed weight: 330 lb (150 kg)

Career information
- High school: Carman-Ainsworth (Flint Township, Michigan)
- College: Michigan (1992–1995)
- NFL draft: 1996: 4th round, 109th overall pick

Career history
- Houston / Tennessee Oilers / Titans (1996–1999); Philadelphia Eagles (2000–2008); San Diego Chargers (2009)

Awards and highlights
- Second-team All-Pro (1999); Pro Bowl (2002); Philadelphia Eagles Hall of Fame; Philadelphia Eagles 75th Anniversary Team; Third-team All-American (1995); First-team All-Big Ten (1995)

Career NFL statistics
- Games played: 207
- Games started: 192
- Stats at Pro Football Reference

Jon Daniel Runyan (born November 27, 1973) is an American athlete and politician who was the U.S. representative for New Jersey's 3rd congressional district from 2011 to 2015 as a member of the Republican Party. Before entering politics, he played football for 14 seasons as an offensive tackle in the National Football League (NFL). He was a participant in the 2003 Pro Bowl following the 2002 NFL season.

He was selected by the Houston Oilers in the fourth round of the 1996 NFL draft and later played for the Philadelphia Eagles and San Diego Chargers. Runyan was the last active NFL player to have played for the Oilers. He played college football for the Michigan Wolverines where he was a 1995 All-Big Ten Conference selection. In high school, he had been an All-State (Michigan) selection in basketball and two-time state champion shot putter. He retired at the end of the 2009 NFL season and launched his campaign for Congress against incumbent freshman Democrat John Adler, winning the general election on November 2, 2010.

On November 6, 2013, Runyan announced he would not seek reelection to Congress in 2014.

On May 17, 2016, the NFL announced they hired Runyan as their Vice President of the Policy and Rules administration.

== Football career ==
=== Early years ===
Runyan was born in Flint, Michigan where his father was an employee of General Motors.

Runyan continues to hold the Flint, Michigan Carman-Ainsworth Middle School shot put record with a 1988 heave of 50 feet 7 inches (15.42 m). Runyan was a two-time Michigan High School Athletic Association state shot put champion for Carman-Ainsworth High School (1991 60 feet 6 inches (18.44 m); 1992 59 feet 5 inches (18.11 m)). He was a 1992 Detroit News second-team All-State basketball center. He was recruited by Michigan State men's basketball, though he declined in order to play football. He chose to play for the Michigan Wolverines football team where he was an All-Big Ten Conference selection for the 1995 Wolverines.

=== Professional ===
Pre-draft measurables
Height	Weight	Arm length	Hand span	40-yard dash	10-yard split	20-yard split	20-yard shuttle	Vertical jump	Broad jump	Bench press
6 ft 7 1/2 in (2.02 m)	308 lb (140 kg)	34 in (0.86 m)	9 5/8 in (0.24 m)	5.34 s	1.80 s	3.12 s	4.73 s	24.5 in (0.62 m)	8 ft 7 in (2.62 m)	25 reps
All values from NFL Combine

==== Houston/Tennessee Oilers/Titans ====
Runyan was selected in the fourth round (109th overall) of the 1996 NFL draft by the Houston Oilers (now the Tennessee Titans). He played with the Houston Oilers in 1996 and became a starter in only the sixth game of his rookie season. He moved with the team as they became the Tennessee Oilers in 1997 and 1998, and finally played one year in the new jerseys as the Tennessee Titans in 1999 when the team made it to Super Bowl XXXIV. Runyan was the last active player in the NFL to have played for the Houston Oilers.

==== Philadelphia Eagles ====
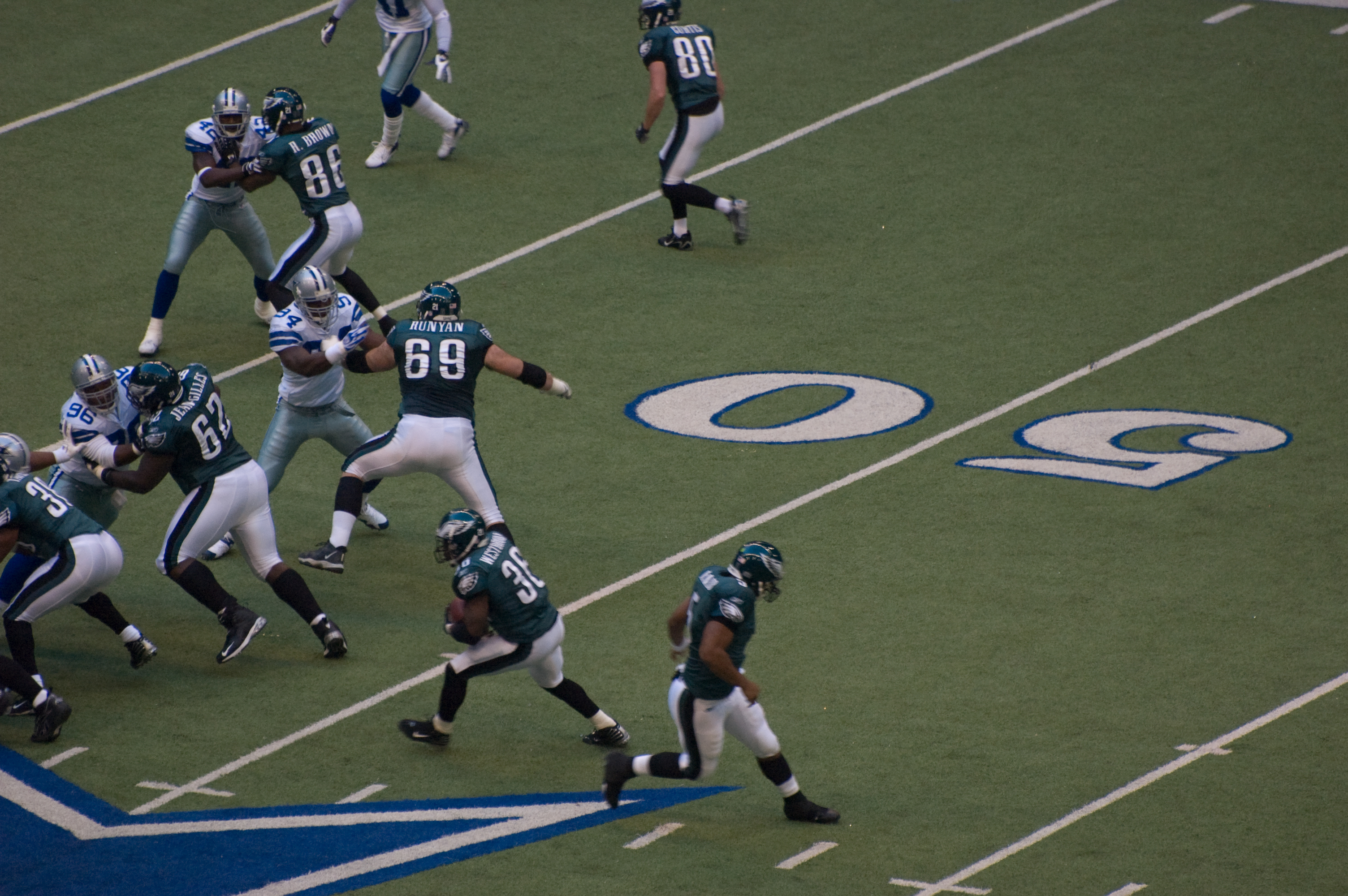
Runyan (No. 69) in an Eagles game against the Dallas Cowboys in December 2007.

Runyan was signed by the Philadelphia Eagles to a six-year, $30 million contract on February 14, 2000, as an unrestricted free agent. The contract made him the highest paid offensive lineman in NFL history at the time. Runyan was selected to the Pro Bowl in 2002.

On March 24, 2006, the Eagles announced that Runyan had re-signed with the team with a three-year contract. He had visited with the New York Jets on March 21 prior to re-signing with the Eagles.

In a Sports Illustrated magazine in October 2006, Runyan was ranked second on a list of the Dirtiest Players in the NFL. Bills linebacker Shawne Merriman stated that Runyan "was one of the dirtiest players I've ever been against in my whole entire life. He was real good at being dirty". Runyan did not deny the charges, criticizing the current game instead: "That's the way the game's supposed to be played. I think they’ve tried to change that over the years. It's turned into a basketball game out there."

In a 2007 game against the Dallas Cowboys, Runyan instructed Eagles running back Brian Westbrook to take a knee at the one-yard line rather than score a touchdown with two minutes left in the game so that Dallas would not get the ball back. Westbrook followed Runyan's direction, the play worked, and Philadelphia won the game.

A 2008 poll revealed that getting blocked by Runyan on a screen pass was one of the scariest things in the NFL.

Runyan held the remarkable streak for an offensive lineman of having started 190 consecutive regular season games. This was the second longest streak among active NFL players in 2008. He has also started in all 18 playoff games his teams have appeared in during this streak.

On January 28, 2009, Runyan had microfracture surgery on his right knee. In February 2009, Runyan's contract expired with the team. He worked out for the Eagles on September 10, but did not sign a contract. He was signed by the San Diego Chargers, playing in five games before retiring.

== U.S. House of Representatives ==
=== Elections ===
2010

In November 2009, published reports indicated Runyan was interested in running for Congress. On November 24, 2009, Runyan announced his congressional bid to challenge one-term Democratic incumbent John Adler for New Jersey's 3rd congressional district, which included parts of Burlington, Camden and Ocean Counties. Libertarian nominee Russ Conger and Your Country Again nominee Lawrence J. Donahue were also running. Even though he now played for the Chargers, he maintained a home in Mount Laurel, across the Delaware River from Philadelphia (and which coincidentally also happens to be home to the headquarters of NFL Films). On March 7, 2010, the Ocean County Republicans endorsed Runyan. On June 8, Runyan won the Republican nomination. On November 2, 2010, Runyan defeated Adler 50%–47%, becoming the first challenger to unseat an incumbent New Jersey Congressman since Rush Holt in 1998. He lost the Burlington and Camden portions of the district, but carried solidly Republican Ocean County by nearly 20,000 votes, far exceeding his overall winning margin of over 6,000 votes. Runyan is the fourth former NFL player to be elected to Congress, after Jack Kemp, Steve Largent, and Heath Shuler.

2012

Runyan was re-elected, defeating attorney Shelley Adler, the widow of John Adler (who intended to run in a rematch, but died suddenly in April 2011). Shelley Adler had defeated Jason Sansone for the Democratic nomination. Runyan won 54% of the vote, to Adler's 45%.

2014

Runyan announced that he would not seek re-election, after expressing frustration with his fellow Republicans over the government shutdown.

=== Tenure ===
Over the course of his tenure, Runyan sponsored 15 pieces of legislation. Like most New Jersey Republicans, he was considered moderate relative to the national party. He voted with the Republican party 92% of the time. Key votes he supported included the payroll tax cut, the balanced budget amendment, defunding of National Public Radio, and the Republican budget plan.

In June 2013, Runyan was one of the sponsors to pass an amendment to H.R. 2217, the Department of Homeland Security Appropriations Act of 2014, which increased the Staffing for Adequate Fire and Emergency Response (SAFER) Grants, and the Assistance to Firefighter Grants (FIRE) by $2.5 million each.

On November 6, 2013, Runyan announced he would not seek reelection in 2014.

=== Sponsored legislation ===
The following is a partial list of bills specifically sponsored (introduced) by Rep. Runyan.

- H.R. 1300 (long title: To amend the Fish and Wildlife Act of 1956 to reauthorize the volunteer programs and community partnerships for the benefit of national wildlife refuges, and for other purposes) is a bill that was introduced into the United States House of Representatives during the 113th United States Congress. The bill would "extend through FY2017 the authorization of appropriations for volunteer services for programs conducted by the United States Fish and Wildlife Service or the National Oceanic and Atmospheric Administration (NOAA), community partnership projects for national wildlife refuges, and refuge education programs."

=== Committee assignments ===
- Committee on Armed Services
  - Subcommittee on Tactical Air and Land Forces
  - Subcommittee on Readiness
- Committee on Veterans Affairs
  - Subcommittee on Disability Assistance and Memorial Affairs (Chair)
  - Subcommittee on Health
- Committee on Natural Resources
  - Subcommittee on Fisheries, Wildlife, Oceans and Insular Affairs

=== Caucus memberships ===
- Bipartisan Military Veterans Caucus
- Congressional Brain Injury Caucus
- Congressional Gaming Caucus
- House Army Caucus
- House Air Force Caucus
- House Coast Guard Caucus
- House Guard and Reserve Caucus
- House Oceans Caucus
- House Republican Israel Caucus
- House Special Operations Caucus
- House USO Caucus
- International Conservation Caucus
- Military Family Caucus
- Congressional Constitution Caucus

== Electoral history ==
New Jersey's 3rd congressional district: Results 2010–2012
Year	Democrat	Votes	Pct	Republican	Votes	Pct	3rd Party	Party	Votes	Pct	3rd Party	Party	Votes	Pct	3rd Party	Party	Votes	Pct
2010	John Adler	104,252	47%	Jon Runyan	110,215	50%	Peter DeStefano	New Jersey; Tea Party	3,284	1%	Russ Conger	Libertarian	1,445	<1%	Lawrence J. Donahue	Your Country; Again	1,113	<1%
2012	Shelley Adler	145,506	45%	Jon Runyan	174,253	54%												

== Personal life ==
Runyan has three children with his ex-wife, Loretta and resides in Mt. Laurel, New Jersey. His son, Jon Runyan Jr., played offensive line for the Michigan Wolverines football program and was selected by the Green Bay Packers in 2020 before signing with the New York Giants in 2024.

Runyan appeared as a construction worker alongside other Philadelphia Eagles in the Season 4 episode "America's Next Top Paddy's Billboard Model Contest" of It's Always Sunny in Philadelphia.

In his spare time, Runyan works as an Uber driver in the Philadelphia area. He is an emeritus board member of the Alzheimer's Association's Delaware Valley Chapter, which represents areas in New Jersey, Delaware, and Pennsylvania.

== See also ==
- Most consecutive starts by Offensive linemen

U.S. House of Representatives
Preceded by John Adler	Member of the U.S. House of Representatives from New Jersey's 3rd congressional district 2011–2015	Succeeded by Tom MacArthur
U.S. order of precedence (ceremonial)
Preceded by Fred Keller as Former U.S. Representative	Order of precedence of the United States as Former U.S. Representative	Succeeded by Tom MacArthur as Former U.S. Representative
