= 1989 Dallas Cowboys season =

30th season in franchise history, first under ownership of Jerry Jones

- Owner: Jerry Jones
- General manager: Jerry Jones and Jimmy Johnson
- Head coach: Jimmy Johnson
- Home stadium: Texas Stadium

Results
- Record: 1–15
- Division place: 5th NFC East
- Playoffs: Did not qualify
- Pro Bowlers: None

The 1989 season was the Dallas Cowboys' 30th in the National Football League (NFL), their first under the ownership of Jerry Jones, their 19th playing their home games at Texas Stadium and their first season under head coach Jimmy Johnson. It was the team's first time in franchise history that Tom Landry was not the head coach, as he was fired by Arkansas oil executive and new team owner Jerry Jones on February 25, 1989. Landry served as Cowboys' head coach since the team's inaugural 1960 season and led the team to 5 Super Bowl appearances, winning 2 of them in his 29 year tenure. This was the first season since 1974 and 1975 season when Randy and Danny White were not on the team's opening day roster.

They failed to improve on their 3–13 record from 1988, finishing at 1–15 and missing the playoffs for the fourth consecutive season. At the time, the 1989 Cowboys were the second team to finish 1–15 since the NFL adopted a 16-game schedule in 1978; the other was the New Orleans Saints in 1980. That list doubled in the next two seasons, thanks to the New England Patriots in 1990 and Indianapolis Colts in 1991.

Jimmy Johnson had compiled a 44–4 record in his last 4 years as coach of the University of Miami Hurricanes.

After the season, Garry Cobb retired.

== Offseason ==
=== NFL draft ===
1989 Dallas Cowboys draft
| Round | Pick | Player | Position | College | Notes |
| 1 | 1 | Troy Aikman * ^{†} | QB | UCLA | |
| 2 | 29 | Steve Wisniewski * | OG | Penn State | He was immediately traded to the Los Angeles Raiders |
| 2 | 39 | Daryl Johnston * | FB | Syracuse | |
| 3 | 57 | Mark Stepnoski * | C | Pittsburgh | |
| 3 | 68 | Rhondy Weston | DE | Florida | |
| 4 | 85 | Tony Tolbert * | DE | UTEP | |
| 5 | 113 | Keith Jennings | TE | Clemson | |
| 5 | 119 | Willis Crockett | LB | Georgia Tech | |
| 5 | 125 | Jeff Roth | DT | Florida | |
| 7 | 168 | Kevin Peterson | LB | Northwestern | |
| 8 | 196 | Charvez Foger | RB | Nevada | |
| 9 | 224 | Tim Jackson | DB | Nebraska | |
| 10 | 252 | Rod Carter | LB | Miami (FL) | |
| 11 | 280 | Randy Shannon | LB | Miami (FL) | |
| 12 | 308 | Scott Ankrom | WR | TCU | |
Made roster † Pro Football Hall of Fame * Made at least one Pro Bowl during career

=== Undrafted free agents ===
1989 undrafted free agents of note
| Player | Position | College |
|---|---|---|
| Scott Adams | Tackle | Georgia |
| Eric Brown | Defensive Back | Savannah State |
| Shawn Daniels | Fullback | Bowling Green |
| John Duff | Tight end | New Mexico |
| Sean Scheller | Defensive end | Stanford |

== Summary ==
Besides the entry of Johnson and Jones, the Cowboys made pre-season headlines by drafting UCLA quarterback Troy Aikman with the first pick in the NFL Draft. Curiously, they also drafted quarterback Steve Walsh later in the NFL's supplemental draft (in doing so, they gave up a number one pick in the 1990 draft). Walsh had played quarterback for Jimmy Johnson at the University of Miami and led the ‘Canes to a 23–1 record as a starter and one national title.

Walsh and Aikman battled for the starting quarterback job in the pre-season, with Aikman winning the nod when the regular season began. Expectations were raised when the Cowboys finished with a strong 3–1 preseason record.

On opening day, the Cowboys were beaten by the New Orleans Saints, 28–0, and went on to finish 1–15 for the season. Aikman broke the index finger on his non-throwing hand in week four and Steve Walsh started the next five games, including the team’s only win, before Aikman returned to finish the season.

Two of the few bright spots of the season were linebacker Eugene Lockhart, who led the league in tackles, and James Dixon, who was one of the NFL’s leaders in kickoff return average.

1989 was the first season in the history of Monday Night Football that did not feature at least one Cowboys game. The Cowboys also played a fifth-place schedule for the first time. Both of these occurrences would happen in 1990 as well.

The only win by the Cowboys during the season was against the rival Redskins in Washington. Though the season seemed a complete failure, it would prove to be the prelude to many great years ahead. Troy Aikman and Michael Irvin, future centerpieces of the Cowboys’ 1992 to 1995 dynasty, headlined this team. During the season, star running back Herschel Walker would be traded to the Minnesota Vikings for multiple players and draft picks. By finishing 1–15 they would have received the top spot in the 1990 NFL draft; however, the pick was forfeited because the Cowboys drafted Walsh in the Supplemental Draft. Later, they would trade and draft a running back out of Florida named Emmitt Smith, with one of the many draft choices obtained from the Vikings in the Herschel Walker trade. Other notable additions to the team that year include center Mark Stepnoski, fullback Daryl Johnston, and defensive end Tony Tolbert.

The two matchups between the Cowboys and Philadelphia Eagles (including one on Thanksgiving) were particularly hostile and became known as the Bounty Bowls.

The 1989 season was the final NFL season for the legendary Ed "Too Tall" Jones and longtime offensive lineman Tom Rafferty. It was also the last season in a Cowboys uniform for stalwart cornerback Everson Walls, who went to the division rival Giants and helped them win Super Bowl XXV.

The Cowboys’ futility matched that of the 1980 New Orleans Saints as they became the second NFL team to end a season at 1–15.

=== Roster ===
Dallas Cowboys 1989 roster
| Quarterbacks: 8 Troy Aikman; 15 Babe Laufenberg; 3 Steve Walsh; Running backs: 48 Daryl Johnston FB; 26 Paul Palmer; 39 Broderick Sargent FB; 28 Curtis Stewart; 25 Junior Tautalatasi; Wide receivers: 81 Scott Ankrom; 82 Cornell Burbage; 86 James Dixon KR; 80 Bernard Ford; 87 Derrick Shepard KR/PR; Tight ends: 85 Steve Folsom; 84 Keith Jennings | Offensive linemen: 66 Kevin Gogan T; 68 Crawford Ker G; 61 Nate Newton G; 64 Tom Rafferty C; 70 Mark Stepnoski C; 71 Mark Tuinei T; 65 Bob White C; 78 Dave Widell T; 76 Jeff Zimmerman T; Defensive linemen: 79 Willie Broughton DT; 75 Jon Carter DT; 60 Dean Hamel DT; 77 Jim Jeffcoat DE; 72 Ed Jones DE; 73 Danny Noonan DT; 62 Tony Tolbert DE | Linebackers: 55 Jack Del Rio OLB; 99 David Howard OLB; 56 Eugene Lockhart MLB; 51 Ken Norton Jr. OLB; 94 Randy Shannon OLB; 54 Jesse Solomon MLB; Defensive backs: 36 Vince Albritton SS; 40 Bill Bates SS; 38 Ron Francis CB; 45 Manny Hendrix CB; 30 Issiac Holt CB; 20 Ray Horton FS; 24 Everson Walls CB; 23 Robert Williams CB; Special teams: 4 Mike Saxon P; 6 Luis Zendejas K | Reserve lists: 33 Eric Brown DB (IR); 90 Willis Crockett LB (IR); 52 Jeff Hurd LB (IR); -- Chad Hennings DT (Military Reserve); 88 Michael Irvin WR (IR); 83 Kelvin Martin WR/PR (IR); 35 Kevin Scott RB (IR); 95 Mark Walen DT (IR); Practice squad: -- J. J. Birden WR; -- Corris Ervin CB; -- Charles Henry TE; Rookies in italics 47 active, 8 inactive, 3 practice squad |

=== Herschel Walker ===
In 1989, at the height of Herschel Walker's NFL career, the Cowboys traded him to the Minnesota Vikings for a total of five players (LB Jesse Solomon, CB Issiac Holt, RB Darrin Nelson, LB David Howard, DE Alex Stewart) and six draft picks (which led to Emmitt Smith, Russell Maryland, Kevin Smith, and Darren Woodson). This was judged to be one of the turning points in the return of the Cowboys to the top echelon of the NFL.

Walker's trade was widely perceived as an exceptionally poor move considering what the Vikings had to give up in order to get him, and remains one of the most frequently vilified roster moves of the team's history. The Vikings coaches reluctantly accepted Walker after the trade and never totally used the tool they had been given. Scout.com says "Walker was never used properly by the coaching brain trust (a total oxymoron in this case)".

== Regular season ==
=== Schedule ===
| Week | Date | Opponent | Result | Record | Venue | Recap |
|---|---|---|---|---|---|---|
| 1 | September 10 | at New Orleans Saints | L 0–28 | 0–1 | Louisiana Superdome | Recap |
| 2 | September 17 | at Atlanta Falcons | L 21–27 | 0–2 | Atlanta–Fulton County Stadium | Recap |
| 3 | September 24 | Washington Redskins | L 7–30 | 0–3 | Texas Stadium | Recap |
| 4 | October 1 | New York Giants | L 13–30 | 0–4 | Texas Stadium | Recap |
| 5 | October 8 | at Green Bay Packers | L 13–31 | 0–5 | Lambeau Field | Recap |
| 6 | October 15 | San Francisco 49ers | L 14–31 | 0–6 | Texas Stadium | Recap |
| 7 | October 22 | at Kansas City Chiefs | L 28–36 | 0–7 | Arrowhead Stadium | Recap |
| 8 | October 29 | Phoenix Cardinals | L 10–19 | 0–8 | Texas Stadium | Recap |
| 9 | November 5 | at Washington Redskins | W 13–3 | 1–8 | Robert F. Kennedy Memorial Stadium | Recap |
| 10 | November 12 | at Phoenix Cardinals | L 20–24 | 1–9 | Sun Devil Stadium | Recap |
| 11 | November 19 | Miami Dolphins | L 14–17 | 1–10 | Texas Stadium | Recap |
| 12 | November 23 | Philadelphia Eagles | L 0–27 | 1–11 | Texas Stadium | Recap |
| 13 | December 3 | Los Angeles Rams | L 31–35 | 1–12 | Texas Stadium | Recap |
| 14 | December 10 | at Philadelphia Eagles | L 10–20 | 1–13 | Veterans Stadium | Recap |
| 15 | December 16 | at New York Giants | L 0–15 | 1–14 | Giants Stadium | Recap |
| 16 | December 24 | Green Bay Packers | L 10–20 | 1–15 | Texas Stadium | Recap |

=== Standings ===
NFC East
| | W | L | T | PCT | DIV | CONF | PF | PA | STK |
|---|---|---|---|---|---|---|---|---|---|
| ^{(2)} New York Giants | 12 | 4 | 0 | .750 | 6–2 | 8–4 | 348 | 252 | W3 |
| ^{(4)} Philadelphia Eagles | 11 | 5 | 0 | .688 | 7–1 | 8–4 | 342 | 274 | W1 |
| Washington Redskins | 10 | 6 | 0 | .625 | 4–4 | 8–4 | 386 | 308 | W5 |
| Phoenix Cardinals | 5 | 11 | 0 | .313 | 2–6 | 4–8 | 258 | 377 | L6 |
| Dallas Cowboys | 1 | 15 | 0 | .063 | 1–7 | 1–13 | 204 | 393 | L7 |

=== Season summary ===
==== Week 5: at Green Bay Packers ====
Week 5: Dallas Cowboys at Green Bay Packers

| Quarter | 1 | 2 | 3 | 4 | Total |
|---|---|---|---|---|---|
| Cowboys | 6 | 7 | 0 | 0 | 13 |
| Packers | 10 | 7 | 7 | 7 | 31 |

at Lambeau Field, Green Bay, Wisconsin

- Date: October 8, 1989
- Game time: 1:00 p.m. CST
- Game weather: Overcast, 39 °F (4 °C)
- Referee: Jerry Markbreit
- TV announcers (CBS): Tim Brant and Dan Jiggetts

Game information

First quarter

Second quarter

Third quarter

Fourth quarter

Top passers

- DAL – Steve Walsh – 18/29, 193 yards, 1 TD, 1 INT
- GB – Don Majkowski – 21/32, 313 yards, 4 TD

Top rushers

- DAL – Herschel Walker – 12 rushes, 44 yards
- GB – Brent Fullwood – 28 rushes, 119 yards

Top receivers

- DAL – Michael Irvin – 6 receptions, 72 yards, TD
- GB – Sterling Sharpe – 6 receptions, 132 yards, TD

==== Week 7: at Kansas City Chiefs ====
Week 7: Dallas Cowboys at Kansas City Chiefs – Game summary

| Quarter | 1 | 2 | 3 | 4 | Total |
|---|---|---|---|---|---|
| Cowboys | 7 | 7 | 0 | 14 | 28 |
| Chiefs | 14 | 13 | 9 | 0 | 36 |

at Arrowhead Stadium, Kansas City, Missouri

- Date: October 22
- Game time: 12:00 p.m. CDT
- Game weather: Clear, 63 °F (17 °C)
- Game attendance: 76,841
- Referee: Jim Tunney
- TV announcers (CBS): Tim Brant and Dan Jiggetts
- Recap

Game information

First quarter

- KC – Christian Okoye 2-yard run (Nick Lowery kick), 8:17. Chiefs 7–0. Drive: 8 plays, 61 yards, 4:57.
- DAL – Paul Palmer 63-yard run (Roger Ruzek kick), 6:20. Tied 7–7. Drive: 3 plays, 72 yards, 1:57.
- KC – Christian Okoye 13-yard run (Nick Lowery kick), 0:36. Chiefs 14–7. Drive: 10 plays, 80 yards, 5:44.

Second quarter

- KC – James Saxon 4-yard run (Nick Lowery kick), 10:13. Chiefs 21–7. Drive: 6 plays, 49 yards, 2:54.
- DAL – James Dixon 97-yard kickoff return (Roger Ruzek kick), 9:57. Chiefs 21–14.
- KC – Nick Lowery 43-yard field goal, 1:56. Chiefs 24–14. Drive: 8 plays, 54 yards, 3:10.
- KC – Nick Lowery 27-yard field goal, 0:03. Chiefs 27–14. Drive: 8 plays, 63 yards, 1:04.

Third quarter

- KC – Punt blocked by Rob McGovern out of bounds in end zone for a Safety, 10:52. Chiefs 29–14.
- KC – Steve Pelluer 5-yard run (Nick Lowery kick), 2:21. Chiefs 36–14. Drive: 8 plays, 42 yards, 5:00.

Fourth quarter

- DAL – Darryl Clack 1-yard run (Roger Ruzek kick), 10:15. Chiefs 36–21. Drive: 11 plays, 71 yards, 7:06.
- DAL – Steve Folsom 4-yard pass from Steve Walsh (Roger Ruzek kick), 3:48. Chiefs 36–28. Drive: 11 plays, 80 yards, 3:33.

Top passers

- DAL – Steve Walsh – 14/29, 166 yards, TD
- KC – Steve DeBerg – 17/22, 237 yards

Top rushers

- DAL – Paul Palmer – 9 rushes, 85 yards, TD
- KC – Christian Okoye – 33 rushes, 170 yards, 2 TD

Top receivers

- DAL – Kelvin Martin – 4 receptions, 52 yards
- KC – Emile Harry – 3 receptions, 64 yards

==== Week 12 vs Eagles ====
Week Twelve: Philadelphia Eagles (7–4) at Dallas Cowboys (1–10)

| Quarter | 1 | 2 | 3 | 4 | Total |
|---|---|---|---|---|---|
| Eagles | 0 | 10 | 14 | 3 | 27 |
| Cowboys | 0 | 0 | 0 | 0 | 0 |

at Texas Stadium, Irving, Texas

- Date: November 23, 1989
- Game time: 4:00 p.m.
- Game weather: 42 °F (6 °C)
- Game attendance: 54,444
- Referee: Gene Barth
- TV announcers (CBS): Pat Summerall and John Madden
- Box Score, Box Score

Game information

First quarter

- No scoring

Second quarter

- PHI – Cris Carter 6-yard pass from Randall Cunningham (Roger Ruzek kick), 13:37. Eagles 7–0.
- PHI – Roger Ruzek 36-yard field goal, 2:46. Eagles 10–0.

Third quarter

- PHI – Cris Carter 18-yard pass from Randall Cunningham (Roger Ruzek kick), 11:27. Eagles 17–0.
- PHI – Keith Byars 1-yard run (Roger Ruzek kick), 6:52. Eagles 24–0.

Fourth quarter

- PHI – Roger Ruzek 38-yard field goal, 14:56. Eagles 27–0.

Top passers

- PHI – Randall Cunningham – 21/33, 234 yards, 2 TD
- DAL – Troy Aikman – 7/21, 54 yards, 3 INT

Top rushers

- PHI – Randall Cunningham – 5 rushes, 46 yards
- DAL – Broderick Sargent – 3 rushes, 44 yards

Top receivers

- PHI – Keith Byars – 8 receptions, 90 yards
- DAL – Derrick Shepard – 3 receptions, 25 yards

"The Bounty Bowl"

==== Week 14: at Philadelphia Eagles ====
| Quarter | 1 | 2 | 3 | 4 | Total |
|---|---|---|---|---|---|
| Cowboys | 0 | 3 | 7 | 0 | 10 |
| Eagles | 0 | 17 | 3 | 0 | 20 |

at Veterans Stadium, Philadelphia, Pennsylvania

- Date: Sunday, December 10
- Game time: 1:00 p.m.
- Game weather: 24 °F (−4.4 °C), wind 9 miles per hour (14 km/h; 7.8 kn)
- Referee: Jerry Seeman
- TV announcers (CBS): Verne Lundquist & Terry Bradshaw

Game information

Second quarter

- PHI – Cris Carter 4 yard pass from Randall Cunningham (Roger Ruzek kick) – Eagles 7–0
- PHI – Cris Carter 13 yard pass from Matt Cavanaugh (Roger Ruzek kick) – Eagles 14–0
- DAL – Luis Zendejas 47 yard field goal – Eagles 14–3
- PHI – Roger Ruzek 29 yard field goal – Eagles 17–3

Third quarter

- PHI – Roger Ruzek 46 yard field goal – Eagles 20–3
- DAL – Daryl Johnston 18 yard pass from Troy Aikman (Luis Zendejas kick) – Eagles 20–10

Cowboys

- Troy Aikman
  17/30, 152 Yds, TD
  6 Rush, 60 Yds
- James Dixon
  6 Rec, 69 Yds

Eagles

- Randall Cunningham
  17/31, 170 Yds, TD
- Anthony Toney
  17 Rush, 49 Yds
- Keith Jackson
  3 Rec, 57 Yds

== Publications ==
- The Football Encyclopedia ISBN 0-312-11435-4
- Total Football ISBN 0-06-270170-3
- Cowboys Have Always Been My Heroes ISBN 0-446-51950-2
