= 1989 Washington Redskins season =

NFL team season

- Owner: Jack Kent Cooke
- General manager: Charley Casserly
- President: John Kent Cooke
- Head coach: Joe Gibbs
- Offensive coordinator: Joe Bugel
- Defensive coordinator: Richie Petitbon
- Home stadium: RFK Stadium

Results
- Record: 10–6
- Division place: 3rd NFC East
- Playoffs: Did not qualify
- Pro Bowlers: DE Charles Mann; QB Mark Rypien

The 1989 Washington Redskins season was the franchise's 58th season in the National Football League (NFL) and their 53rd in Washington, D.C. They improved on their 7–9 record from 1988 to 10–6 in 1989, finishing third in the NFC East. However, they failed to qualify for the playoffs for a second consecutive season.

== Offseason ==
1989 Washington Redskins draft
Round	Selection	Player	Position	College
3	66	Tracy Rocker	Defensive tackle	Auburn
4	110	Erik Affholter	Wide receiver	USC
5	129	Tim Smiley	Defensive back	Arkansas State
5	139	Lybrant Robinson	Defensive end	Delaware State
6	149	A.J. Johnson	Defensive back	Southwest Texas State
7	179	Kevin Hendrix	Linebacker	South Carolina
9	233	Charles Darrington	Tight end	Kentucky
10	263	Mark Schlereth	Guard	Idaho
12	316	Jimmie Johnson	Tight end	Howard
12	317	Joe Mickles	Running back	Mississippi

== Roster ==
1989 Washington Redskins roster
Quarterbacks (QB): 11 Mark Rypien; 16 Stan Humphries; 17 Doug Williams; Running backs (RB): 29 Reggie Branch; 21 Earnest Byner; 25 Reggie Dupard; 22 Jamie Morris; 37 Gerald Riggs; Wide receivers (WR): 84 Gary Clark; 89 Carl Harry; 81 Art Monk; 83 Ricky Sanders; Tight ends (TE): 88 Jimmie Johnson; 87 Terry Orr; 86 Mike Tice; 85 Don Warren	Offensive linemen (OL): 53 Jeff Bostic C; 67 Ray Brown G/T; 68 Russ Grimm G; 79 Jim Lachey T; 63 Raleigh McKenzie G; 69 Mark Schlereth G; 76 Ed Simmons T; Defensive linemen (DL): 77 Darryl Grant DT; 71 Charles Mann DE; 78 Lybrant Robinson DE; 99 Tracy Rocker DT; 75 Mike Stensrud DT; 60 Fred Stokes DE	Linebackers (LB): 56 Brian Bonner OLB; 50 Ravin Caldwell OLB; 51 Monte Coleman OLB; 54 Kurt Gouveia OLB; 91 Greg Manusky MLB; 58 Wilber Marshall OLB; 52 Neal Olkewicz MLB; Defensive backs (DB): 23 Todd Bowles FS; 34 Brian Davis CB; 26 Wayne Davis CB; 47 A. J. Johnson CB; 35 Martin Mayhew CB; 31 Clarence Vaughn SS; 40 Alvin Walton SS; 20 Herb Welch FS; Special teams (ST): 59 Dave Harbour LS; 8 Chip Lohmiller K; 2 Ralf Mojsiejenko P	Practice squad: 90 Grantis Bell WR; 57 Dan Murray LB; Reserve: 24 Kelvin Bryant RB (IR); 28 Darrell Green CB (IR); -- Stephen Hobbs WR (IR); 66 Joe Jacoby T (IR); 80 Joe Howard WR (IR); 74 Markus Koch DT (IR); 72 Dexter Manley DE (Susp.); 73 Mark May G (IR); 30 Joe Mickles RB (IR); -- Stacy Price LB (IR); -- Eugene Profit CB (IR); 64 Ralph Tamm C (IR); 82 Ken Whisenhunt TE (IR); 45 Barry Wilburn CB (IR); 47 active, 14 inactive, 2 practice squad Rookies in italics

== Regular season ==
In a week 14 victory against the San Diego Chargers, Joe Gibbs achieved career victory no. 100

=== Schedule ===
Week	Date	Opponent	Result	Record	Venue	Attendance	Recap
1	September 11	**New York Giants**	**L** 24–27	0–1	RFK Stadium	54,160	Recap
2	September 17	**Philadelphia Eagles**	**L** 37–42	0–2	RFK Stadium	53,493	Recap
3	September 24	at **Dallas Cowboys**	**W** 30–7	1–2	Texas Stadium	63,200	Recap
4	October 1	at New Orleans Saints	**W** 16–14	2–2	Louisiana Superdome	64,358	Recap
5	October 8	**Phoenix Cardinals**	**W** 30–28	3–2	RFK Stadium	53,335	Recap
6	October 15	at **New York Giants**	**L** 17–20	3–3	Giants Stadium	76,245	Recap
7	October 22	Tampa Bay Buccaneers	**W** 32–28	4–3	RFK Stadium	53,862	Recap
8	October 29	at Los Angeles Raiders	**L** 24–37	4–4	Los Angeles Memorial Coliseum	52,781	Recap
9	November 5	**Dallas Cowboys**	**L** 3–13	4–5	RFK Stadium	53,187	Recap
10	November 12	at **Philadelphia Eagles**	**W** 10–3	5–5	Veterans Stadium	65,443	Recap
11	November 20	Denver Broncos	**L** 10–14	5–6	RFK Stadium	52,975	Recap
12	November 26	Chicago Bears	**W** 38–14	6–6	RFK Stadium	50,044	Recap
13	December 3	at **Phoenix Cardinals**	**W** 29–10	7–6	Sun Devil Stadium	38,870	Recap
14	December 10	San Diego Chargers	**W** 26–21	8–6	RFK Stadium	47,693	Recap
15	December 17	at Atlanta Falcons	**W** 31–30	9–6	Atlanta–Fulton County Stadium	37,501	Recap
16	December 23	at Seattle Seahawks	**W** 29–0	10–6	Kingdome	60,294	Recap

Note: Intra-division opponents are in bold text.

=== Standings ===
NFC East
	W	L	T	PCT	DIV	CONF	PF	PA	STK
^{(2)} New York Giants	12	4	0	.750	6–2	8–4	348	252	W3
^{(4)} Philadelphia Eagles	11	5	0	.688	7–1	8–4	342	274	W1
Washington Redskins	10	6	0	.625	4–4	8–4	386	308	W5
Phoenix Cardinals	5	11	0	.313	2–6	4–8	258	377	L6
Dallas Cowboys	1	15	0	.063	1–7	1–13	204	393	L7

== Awards and honors ==
- Charles Mann, Pro Bowl selection
