= 1989 Philadelphia Eagles season =

NFL team season

- Owner: Norman Braman
- Head coach: Buddy Ryan
- Offensive coordinator: Ted Plumb
- Defensive coordinator: Jeff Fisher
- Home stadium: Veterans Stadium

Results
- Record: 11–5
- Division place: 2nd NFC East
- Playoffs: Lost Wild Card Playoffs (vs. Rams) 7–21

Uniform
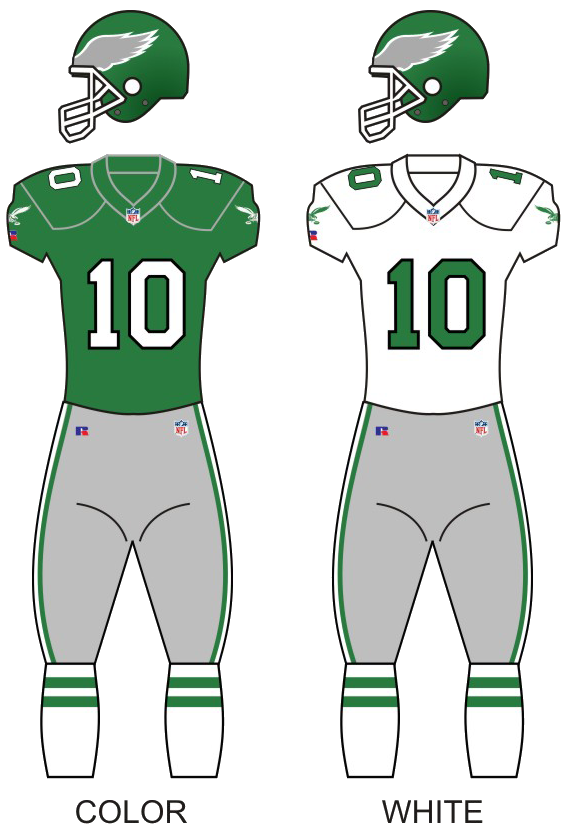

The 1989 Philadelphia Eagles season was the franchise's 57th season in the National Football League (NFL).

This season marked the Eagles’ second consecutive appearance in the postseason, this time as a wild-card team. They would lose in the Wild Card round to the Los Angeles Rams 21–7.

Tribulation struck the Eagles late in the season with the death of quarterbacks coach Doug Scovil from a heart attack. For the remainder of the season, the Eagles wore a black stripe made of electrical tape over the wings on their helmet in tribute.

It was Hall of Famer Cris Carter's final season in Philadelphia as his on-and-off the field troubles led to his release the following preseason. He would then sign with the Minnesota Vikings.

== Offseason ==
=== Draft ===
1989 Philadelphia Eagles draft
Round	Pick	Player	Position	College	Notes
2	49	Jessie Small	LB	Eastern Kentucky	
3	76	Robert Drummond	RB	Syracuse	
3	81	Britt Hager	LB	Texas	
6	162	Heath Sherman	RB	Texas A&M–Kingsville	
Made roster † Pro Football Hall of Fame * Made at least one Pro Bowl during career

== Personnel ==
=== Staff / Coaches ===
1989 Philadelphia Eagles staff
Front office: Owner – Norman Braman; President and Chief Operating Officer – Harry Gamble; Director of Player Personnel – Joe Woolley; Head coaches: Head Coach – Buddy Ryan; Offensive coaches: Assistant Head Coach/Offense – Ted Plumb; Quarterbacks – Doug Scovil; Offensive Backs – Dave Atkins; Offensive Line – Bill Walsh; Assistant Offensive Line – Dan Neal; Offensive Assistant – Ed Hughes	Defensive coaches: Defensive Coordinator/Linebackers – Jeff Fisher; Defensive Line – Dale Haupt; Linebackers – Ronnie Jones; Defensive Backs – Tom Bettis; Special teams coaches: Special Teams – Al Roberts; Strength and conditioning: Strength and Conditioning – Ronnie Jones

=== Roster ===
1989 Philadelphia Eagles roster
Quarterbacks (QB): 6 Matt Cavanaugh; 12 Randall Cunningham; 9 Don McPherson; Running backs (RB): 41 Keith Byars; 36 Robert Drummond; 22 Mark Higgs KR; 23 Heath Sherman KR; 25 Anthony Toney; Wide receivers (WR): 87 Carlos Carson; 80 Cris Carter; 84 Anthony Edwards; 85 Ron Johnson; Tight ends (TE): 83 Jimmie Giles; 88 Keith Jackson; 89 David Little LS	Offensive linemen (OL): 72 David Alexander C; 67 Steve Gabbard T; 73 Ron Heller T; 66 Ken Reeves T; 50 Dave Rimington C; 79 Mike Schad G; 68 Reggie Singletary G/T; 66 Ron Solt G; 61 Ben Tamburello G; Defensive linemen (DL): 99 Jerome Brown DT; 90 Mike Golic DT; 94 Steve Kaufusi DE; 74 Mike Pitts DT; 96 Clyde Simmons DE; 92 Reggie White DE	Linebackers (LB): 56 Byron Evans MLB; 54 Britt Hager MLB; 95 Al Harris OLB; 59 Seth Joyner OLB; 55 Mike Reichenbach OLB; 51 Ricky Shaw OLB; 52 Jessie Small OLB; Defensive backs (DB): 21 Eric Allen CB; 42 Eric Everett CB; 33 William Frizzell CB/S; 34 Terry Hoage FS; 48 Wes Hopkins FS; 46 Izel Jenkins CB; 37 Sammy Lilly CB; 20 Andre Waters SS; Special teams (ST): 7 Roger Ruzek K; 14 Rick Tuten P	Practice squad: 93 David Bailey DE; 24 Alan Dial S; 31 Tyrone Jones S; 32 Garrett Limbrick RB; 86 John Talley TE; Reserve: 58 Ty Allert LB (IR); 49 Todd Bell S (IR); 78 Matt Darwin T (IR); 83 Gregg Garrity WR (IR); 57 Ron Moten LB (IR); 82 Mike Quick WR (IR); 10 John Teltschik P (IR); 47 active, 7 inactive, 5 practice squad Rookies in italics

== Regular season ==
Randall Cunningham enjoyed the second of back-to-back breakout seasons, beginning with his leading the Eagles to a 42–37 comeback victory at RFK Stadium on September 17, right after signing a contract extension.

The Eagles won five of their last six games to challenge the Giants for the division lead. On Thanksgiving Day at Texas Stadium, the Eagles shutout their division rival Cowboys 27–0, amidst accusations that certain defensive players were rewarded with bounties to take out several Dallas players, including kicker Luis Zendejas. Less than two weeks later, back in Philadelphia, Eagles fans pelted the Cowboys and game officials with snowballs packed in ice thanks to freezing temperatures and snowfall from the previous day.

The two matchups between the Cowboys and Eagles became known as the Bounty Bowls.

=== Schedule ===
Week	Date	Opponent	Result	Record	Attendance
1	September 10, 1989	Seattle Seahawks	**W** 31–7	1–0	64,287
2	September 17, 1989	at **Washington Redskins**	**W** 42–37	2–0	53,493
3	September 24, 1989	San Francisco 49ers	**L** 38–28	2–1	66,042
4	October 2, 1989	at Chicago Bears	**L** 27–13	2–2	66,625
5	October 8, 1989	**New York Giants**	**W** 21–19	3–2	65,688
6	October 15, 1989	at **Phoenix Cardinals**	**W** 17–5	4–2	42,620
7	October 22, 1989	Los Angeles Raiders	**W** 10–7	5–2	64,019
8	October 29, 1989	at Denver Broncos	**W** 28–24	6–2	75,065
9	November 5, 1989	at San Diego Chargers	**L** 20–17	6–3	47,019
10	November 12, 1989	**Washington Redskins**	**L** 10–3	6–4	65,443
11	November 19, 1989	Minnesota Vikings	**W** 10–9	7–4	65,944
12	November 23, 1989	at **Dallas Cowboys**	**W** 27–0	8–4	54,444
13	December 3, 1989	at **New York Giants**	**W** 24–17	9–4	74,809
14	December 10, 1989	**Dallas Cowboys**	**W** 20–10	10–4	59,842
15	December 18, 1989	at New Orleans Saints	**L** 30–20	10–5	59,218
16	December 24, 1989	**Phoenix Cardinals**	**W** 31–14	11–5	43,287

Note: Intra-division opponents are in bold text.

=== Game summaries ===
==== Week 1 ====
Team	1	2	3	4	Total
Seahawks	7	0	0	0	7
• Eagles	7	10	7	7	31

- Date: September 10
- Location: Veterans Stadium
- Referee: Gordon McCarter
- TV announcers (NBC): Joel Meyers and Paul Maguire

==== Week 2 ====
Team	1	2	3	4	Total
• Eagles	7	7	7	21	42
Redskins	20	10	0	7	37

- Date: September 17
- Location: RFK Stadium
- Referee: Gene Barth
- TV announcers (CBS): Verne Lundquist and Terry Bradshaw

==== Week 3 ====
Team	1	2	3	4	Total
• 49ers	7	3	0	28	38
Eagles	9	3	6	10	28

- Date: September 24
- Location: Veterans Stadium
- Referee: Dick Jorgensen
- TV announcers (CBS): Verne Lundquist and Terry Bradshaw

==== Week 4 ====
Team	1	2	3	4	Total
Eagles	0	0	3	10	13
• Bears	0	13	7	7	27

- Date: October 2
- Location: Soldier Field
- Referee: Pat Haggerty
- TV announcers (ABC): Al Michaels, Frank Gifford, Dan Dierdorf

==== Week 5 ====
Team	1	2	3	4	Total
Giants	3	10	0	6	19
• Eagles	0	7	0	14	21

- Date: October 8
- Location: Veterans Stadium
- Referee: Tom Dooley
- TV announcers (CBS): Pat Summerall and John Madden

==== Week 6 ====
Team	1	2	3	4	Total
• Eagles	0	0	14	3	17
Cardinals	0	5	0	0	5

- Date: October 15
- Location: Sun Devil Stadium
- Referee: Jerry Seeman
- TV announcers (CBS): Steve Zabriskie and Hank Stram

==== Week 7 ====
Team	1	2	3	4	Total
Raiders	0	0	0	7	7
• Eagles	0	0	10	0	10

- Date: October 22
- Location: Veterans Stadium
- Referee: Dick Hantak
- TV announcers (NBC): Joel Meyers and Paul Maguire

==== Week 8 ====
Team	1	2	3	4	Total
• Eagles	14	0	7	7	28
Broncos	0	7	10	7	24

- Date: October 29
- Location: Mile High Stadium
- Referee: Jim Tunney
- TV announcers (CBS): Verne Lundquist and Terry Bradshaw

==== Week 9 ====
Team	1	2	3	4	Total
Eagles	0	7	0	10	17
• Chargers	7	0	10	3	20

- Date: November 5
- Location: Jack Murphy Stadium
- Referee: Dick Jorgensen
- TV announcers (CBS): Tim Brant and Dan Jiggetts

==== Week 10 ====
Team	1	2	3	4	Total
• Redskins	3	7	0	0	10
Eagles	0	3	0	0	3

- Date: November 12
- Location: Veterans Stadium
- Referee: Dale Hamer
- TV announcers (CBS): Verne Lundquist and Terry Bradshaw

==== Week 11 ====
Team	1	2	3	4	Total
Vikings	6	0	3	0	9
• Eagles	3	0	0	7	10

- Date: November 19
- Location: Veterans Stadium
- Referee: Johnny Grier
- TV announcers (CBS): Verne Lundquist and Terry Bradshaw

==== Week 12 at Cowboys ====
Week Twelve: Philadelphia Eagles (7–4) at Dallas Cowboys (1–10)

Quarter	1	2	3	4	Total
**Eagles**	0	10	14	3	**27**
Cowboys	0	0	0	0	**0**

at Texas Stadium, Irving, Texas

- Date: November 23, 1989
- Game time: 4:00 p.m.
- Game weather: 42 °F (6 °C)
- Game attendance: 54,444
- Referee: Gene Barth
- TV announcers (CBS): Pat Summerall and John Madden
- Box Score, Box Score

Game information

**First quarter**

- No scoring

**Second quarter**

- PHI – Cris Carter 6-yard pass from Randall Cunningham (Roger Ruzek kick), 13:37. Eagles 7–0.
- PHI – Roger Ruzek 36-yard field goal, 2:46. Eagles 10–0.

**Third quarter**

- PHI – Cris Carter 18-yard pass from Randall Cunningham (Roger Ruzek kick), 11:27. Eagles 17–0.
- PHI – Keith Byars 1-yard run (Roger Ruzek kick), 6:52. Eagles 24–0.

**Fourth quarter**

- PHI – Roger Ruzek 38-yard field goal, 14:56. Eagles 27–0.

Top passers

- PHI – Randall Cunningham – 21/33, 234 yards, 2 TD
- DAL – Troy Aikman – 7/21, 54 yards, 3 INT

Top rushers

- PHI – Randall Cunningham – 5 rushes, 46 yards
- DAL – Broderick Sargent – 3 rushes, 44 yards

Top receivers

- PHI – Keith Byars – 8 receptions, 90 yards
- DAL – Derrick Shepard – 3 receptions, 25 yards

"The Bounty Bowl"

Reggie White won the Turkey Leg Award

==== Week 13 ====
Team	1	2	3	4	Total
• Eagles	14	3	0	7	24
Giants	7	0	10	0	17

- Date: December 3
- Location: Giants Stadium
- Referee: Gordon McCarter
- TV announcers (CBS): Pat Summerall and John Madden

==== Week 14 ====
Quarter	1	2	3	4	Total
Cowboys	0	3	7	0	**10**
**Eagles**	0	17	3	0	**20**

at Veterans Stadium, Philadelphia

- Date: December 10
- Game time: 1:00 p.m.
- Game weather: 24 °F (−4 °C), wind 9 mph (14 km/h)
- Referee: Jerry Seeman
- TV announcers (CBS): Verne Lundquist and Terry Bradshaw
- Pro-Football-Reference.com

Game information

**Second quarter**

- PHI – Cris Carter 4-yard pass from Randall Cunningham (Roger Ruzek kick) – **Eagles 7–0**
- PHI – Cris Carter 13-yard pass from Matt Cavanaugh (Roger Ruzek kick) – **Eagles 14–0**
- DAL – Luis Zendejas 47-yard field goal – **Eagles 14–3**
- PHI – Roger Ruzek 29-yard field goal – **Eagles 17–3**

**Third quarter**

- PHI – Roger Ruzek 46-yard field goal – **Eagles 20–3**
- DAL – Daryl Johnston 18-yard pass from Troy Aikman (Luis Zendejas kick) – **Eagles 20–10**

**Cowboys**

- Troy Aikman
  17/30, 152 Yds, TD
  6 Rush, 60 Yds
- James Dixon
  6 Rec, 69 Yds

**Eagles**

- Randall Cunningham
  17/31, 170 Yds, TD
- Anthony Toney
  17 Rush, 49 Yds
- Keith Jackson
  3 Rec, 57 Yds

==== Week 15 ====
Team	1	2	3	4	Total
Eagles	0	10	10	0	20
• Saints	7	9	0	14	30

- Date: December 18
- Location: Louisiana Superdome
- Game weather: Indoors (dome)
- Referee: Ben Dreith
- TV announcers (ABC): Frank Gifford, Al Michaels, Dan Dierdorf

==== Week 16 ====
Team	1	2	3	4	Total
Cardinals	7	7	0	0	14
• Eagles	7	14	3	7	31

- Date: December 24
- Location: Veterans Stadium
- Referee: Red Cashion
- TV announcers (CBS): Verne Lundquist and Terry Bradshaw

=== Standings ===
NFC East
	W	L	T	PCT	DIV	CONF	PF	PA	STK
New York Giants^{(2)}	12	4	0	.750	6–2	8–4	348	252	W3
Philadelphia Eagles^{(4)}	11	5	0	.688	7–1	8–4	342	274	W1
Washington Redskins	10	6	0	.625	4–4	8–4	386	308	W5
Phoenix Cardinals	5	11	0	.313	2–6	4–8	258	377	L6
Dallas Cowboys	1	15	0	.063	1–7	1–13	204	393	L7

== Postseason ==
=== Schedule ===
Round	Date	Opponent (seed)	Result	Record	Venue	Recap
Wild Card	December 31, 1989	Los Angeles Rams (5)	L 7–21	0–1	Veterans Stadium	Recap

=== Game summaries ===
==== NFC Wild Card Playoffs: vs. (5) Los Angeles Rams ====
NFC Wild Card Playoffs: (5) Los Angeles Rams at (4) Philadelphia Eagles – Game summary

Quarter	1	2	3	4	Total
Rams	14	0	0	7	21
Eagles	0	0	0	7	7

at Veterans Stadium, Philadelphia, Pennsylvania

- Date: December 31, 1989
- Game time: 12:30 p.m. EST
- Game attendance: 65,479
- Referee: Gordon McCarter
- TV announcers (CBS): Pat Summerall (play-by-play) and John Madden (color commentator)

Game information

First quarter

- RAMS – Henry Ellard 39-yard pass from Jim Everett (Mike Lansford kick). Rams 7–0.
- RAMS – Damone Johnson 4-yard pass from Jim Everett (Mike Lansford kick). Rams 14–0.

Second quarter

- No scoring plays.

Third quarter

- No scoring plays.

Fourth quarter

- PHI – Anthony Toney 1-yard run (Roger Ruzek kick). Rams 14–7.
- RAMS – Greg Bell 7-yard run (Mike Lansford kick). Rams 21–7.

Top passers

- RAMS – Jim Everett – 18/33, 281 yards, 2 TD, 2 INT
- PHI – Randall Cunningham – 24/40, 238 yards, INT

Top rushers

- RAMS – Greg Bell – 27 rushes, 124 yards, TD
- PHI – Heath Sherman – 9 rushes, 44 yards

Top receivers

- RAMS – Henry Ellard – 4 receptions, 87 yards, TD
- PHI – Keith Byars – 9 receptions, 68 yards

The Los Angeles Rams, ignoring the weather, the fans, and the Eagles mighty defense, rode a quick start to defeat the Eagles at Veterans Stadium, 21–7 on New Year's Eve, 1989. The Eagles came into their first home playoff game in 8 seasons against the Los Angeles Rams with injury concerns. Several players came limping into the game, but perhaps the most concerning injury was that of Eric Allen, whose ankle had been injured a few weeks prior. Allen was an outstanding cover corner and without him, the Eagles would be forced to start reserve cornerback Izel Jenkins. The Rams at the time had a potent and versatile offense, especially in the passing game. Quarterback Jim Everett, running back Greg Bell and wideouts Henry Ellard and Willie "Flipper" Anderson rounded out the Rams offense. However, none of this seemed to concern head coach Buddy Ryan, who reportedly was asked the week leading up the game his impression of Rams running back Greg Bell. Ryan gave a curious vanilla answer to the reporter then turned and walked away saying, "Greg Bell my ass." Most of the media that had gathered exploded in laughter.

Eric Allen, as it turned out, did not start the game, which was played on an overcast, drizzly New Year's Eve. The Rams immediately attacked Allen's replacement, cornerback Izel Jenkins. Jenkins was burned on the Rams first touchdown; a 39-yard touchdown pass from Jim Everett to Henry Ellard on the Rams first possession. Jenkins was again burned for another long pass, this time to Willie Anderson and by midway through the second quarter, head coach Buddy Ryan had all but no choice to insert the limping Allen with the Rams already leading 14–0.

The Eagles offense, led by All-Pro quarterback Randall Cunningham had no answers for a unique zone implemented by Rams defensive coordinator Fritz Shurmer, who at times during the game only rushed two defenders and dropped everything back in coverage. Cunningham, while completing 24 of 40 pass, only threw underneath the zone for the majority of the game and simply was unable to get anything downfield. It certainly did not help matters not having All-Pro receiver Mike Quick unable to play due to a season-ending injury earlier in the year. The Eagles had less than 100 yards of offense at halftime, and did not have a single first down till midway through the second quarter. The Eagles first four possessions where three (3) three and outs and an interception. When the Eagles finally did score on a one-yard Anthony Toney touchdown plunge to make the game 14–7 with just under 11 minutes to go, there was hope. The Eagles defense, after their shaky start, had by and large held the Rams in check. Indeed, after the Eagles only touchdown of the afternoon, the Eagles defense held the Rams twice and gave the Eagles good field position on their next two possessions, which began at their own 31- and 40-yard lines. However, the Eagles would manage just one first down on those two possessions.

The Rams finally put the nail in the coffin with just under three minutes left, when Greg Bell ran for a 7-yard touchdown for the final score of 21–7. This touchdown run came a few plays after Bell ran 54 yards down to the 10-yard line. The Eagles defense, especially the front four, had finally collapsed after keeping the Rams in check for so long during the game.

== Statistics ==
=== Defense ===
Player	Games	Sacks	Int	Yards	TD	Forced Fumbles	Fumble Recovery	Tackles
Byron Evans	16	2.0	3	23	0	0	3	184
Clyde Simmons	16	15.5	1	60	1	3	0	135

=== Offense ===
==== Passing ====
Note: Comp = Completions; ATT = Attempts; TD = Touchdowns; INT = Interceptions

Player	Games	Comp	Att	Yards	TD	INT	Rating
Randall Cunningham	16	290	532	3400	21	15	75.5
Matt Cavanaugh	9	3	5	33	1	1	79.6
Roger Ruzek	5	1	1	22	1	0	158.3

==== Receiving ====
Note: ATT = Attempts; TD = Touchdowns; INT = Interceptions

Player	Games	Reception	Yards	TD	Long
Keith Byars	16	68	721	0	60
Keith Jackson	14	63	648	3	33
Cris Carter	16	45	605	11	42
Ron Johnson	14	20	295	1	34
Anthony Toney	14	19	124	0	15
Robert Drummond	16	17	180	1	21
Jimmie Giles	16	16	225	2	66
Gregg Garrity	9	13	209	2	31
Mike Quick	6	13	228	2	40
Heath Sherman	15	8	85	0	17
Gizmo Williams	13	4	32	0	11
Mark Higgs	15	3	9	0	8
Anthony Edwards	9	2	74	0	66
Dave Little	16	2	8	1	7
Carlos Carson	6	1	12	0	12

==== Rushing ====
Note: ATT = Attempts; TD = Touchdowns; INT = Interceptions

Player	Games	Att	Yards	TD	Long
Randall Cunningham	16	104	621	4	51
Anthony Toney	14	172	582	3	44
Keith Byars	16	133	452	5	16
Mark Higgs	15	49	184	0	13
Heath Sherman	15	40	177	2	37
Robert Drummond	16	32	127	0	16
Mike Reichenbach	16	1	30	0	30
John Teltschik	16	1	23	0	23
Cris Carter	16	2	16	0	11

=== Special teams ===
==== Kick returns ====
Player	Games	Returns	Yards	TD	Long	Yards per return
Keith Byars	16	1	27	0	27	27.0
Mark Higgs	15	16	293	0	30	18.3
Dave Little	16	2	14	0	12	7.0
Heath Sherman	15	13	222	0	45	17.1
Gizmo Williams	13	14	249	0	28	17.8

==== Punt returns ====
Player	Games	Returns	Yards	TD	Long	Yards per return
Anthony Edwards	9	7	64	0	28	9.1
Gizmo Williams	13	30	267	0	24	8.9

==== Kicking ====
Note: FGA = Field goals attempted; FGM = Field goals made; FG% = Field goal percentage; XPA = Extra points attempted; XPM = Extra points made; XP% = Extra points percentage

Player	Games	FGA	FGM	FG %	XPA	XPM	XP %
Steve DeLine	3	7	3	42.9%	3	3	100.0%
Roger Ruzek	5	11	8	72.7%	14	14	100.0%
Luis Zendejas	8	15	9	60.0%	23	23	100.0%

==== Punting ====
Player	Games	Punts	Yards	Long	Block	Yards per Punt
Randall Cunningham	16	6	319	91	0	53.2
Max Runager	4	17	568	52	0	33.4
John Teltschik	10	57	2245	58	0	39.4
Rick Tuten	2	7	256	45	0	36.6

== Awards and honors ==
- Keith Byars, Led all NFL running backs in receiving yardage
- Keith Jackson, Pro Bowl selection
