= Mike Reichenbach =

Mike Reichenbach may refer to:

- Mike Reichenbach (American football) (born 1961), American football player
- Mike Reichenbach (politician), American politician
