= Bounty Bowl =

Pair of 1989 NFL games

The Bounty Bowl was the name given to two NFL games held in 1989 between the Philadelphia Eagles and Dallas Cowboys. The first, a 1989 Thanksgiving Day game in Dallas, was noted for allegations that the Eagles put a $200 bounty on Cowboys kicker Luis Zendejas, who had been cut by Philadelphia earlier that season. The second was a rematch held two weeks later in Philadelphia. The Eagles, who were heavy favorites to win both games, swept the series.

== Bounty Bowl I: The 1989 Thanksgiving Classic ==
Bounty Bowl I
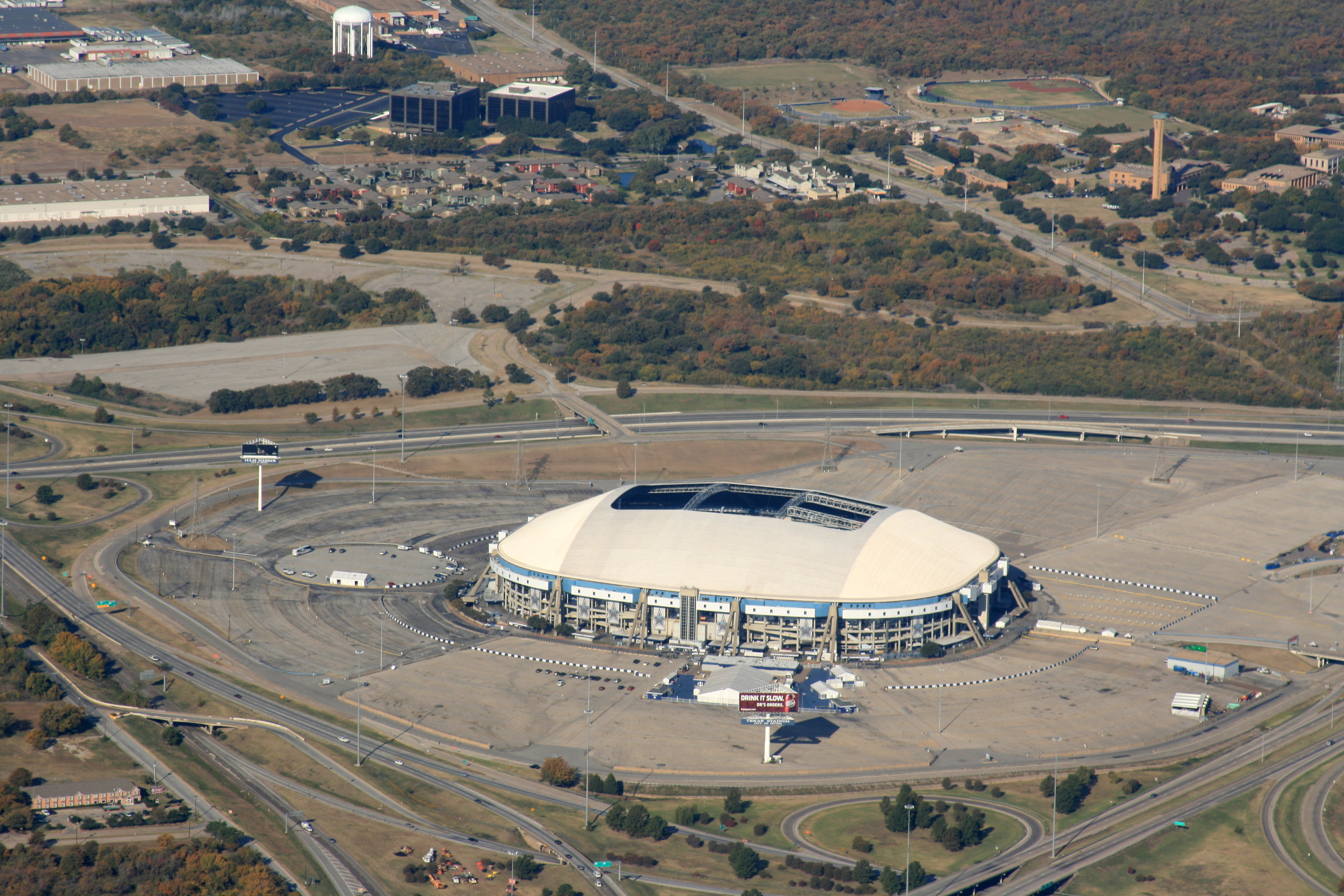
- Texas Stadium, the site of the game.
Philadelphia Eagles (7–4)	Dallas Cowboys (1–10)
27	0
Head coach: Buddy Ryan	Head coach: Jimmy Johnson
	1	2	3	4	Total
PHI	0	10	14	3	27
DAL	0	0	0	0	0
- Date: November 23, 1989
- Stadium: Texas Stadium; Irving, Texas
- Favorite: Philadelphia -6
- Referee: Gene Barth

TV in the United States
- Network: CBS
- Announcers: Pat Summerall and John Madden

The Cowboys/Eagles rivalry had been increasingly heated since the 1986 season, with Buddy Ryan arriving as the Eagles' head coach; the next year, during the NFL players' strike, the Cowboys (who were playing with a number of players that crossed picket lines) routed an Eagles squad filled with replacement players; Ryan, believing that the Cowboys had run up the score in poor form, responded in kind in the second game when the strike was over. After the 1988 season, the Cowboys were sold to Jerry Jones, who proceeded to gut the team and fire longtime head coach Tom Landry in preparation for rebuilding.

On November 23, 1989, the Philadelphia Eagles defeated the Dallas Cowboys 27–0. Following the game, which was broadcast on CBS, Cowboys head coach Jimmy Johnson alleged that Ryan had taken out a bounty on two of the former's players, kicker Luis Zendejas and quarterback Troy Aikman:

I have absolutely no respect for the way they played the game, I would have said something to Buddy, but he wouldn't stand on the field long enough. He put his big, fat rear end into the dressing room.

Ryan denied the bounty accusation, saying that film of the game "show that Small had no intention of hurting Zendejas." The Philadelphia coach asserted it would have been in the Eagles' best interests to keep Zendejas in the game because he was in a slump. Ryan also joked about Johnson's accusations:

I resent that. I've been on a diet, I lost a couple of pounds, and I thought I was looking good.

When the Cowboys and Eagles met on Thanksgiving 25 years later, on November 27, 2014, Johnson joked that Ryan put up the bounty offer to keep his players interested since the Cowboys, who ultimately went 1-15, performed so poorly that year.

Zendejas spoke of having seen "Buddy call guys out and give them $100" for what the kicker called a weekly Big Hit award but what Ryan called a Big Play award. This set of events set the stage for the scheduled rematch two weeks later in Philadelphia, dubbed "Bounty Bowl II." As for the Eagles, they would not play another Thanksgiving game until the 2008 NFL season when the Eagles faced the Arizona Cardinals in a preview of that season's NFC Championship Game.

== Bounty Bowl II ==
Bounty Bowl II
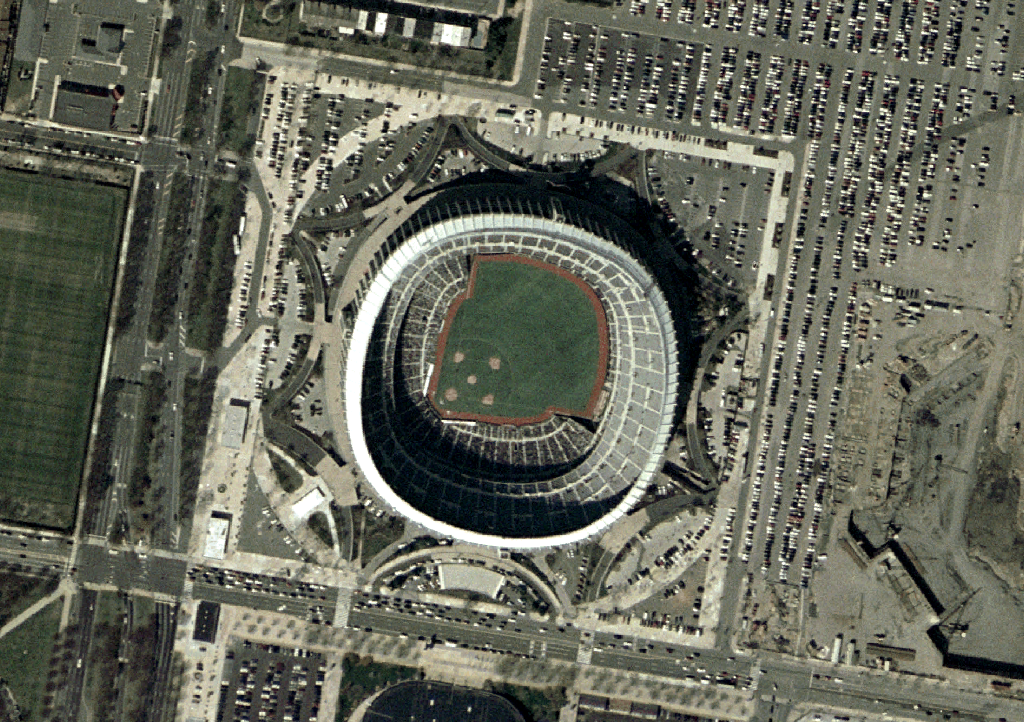
- Veterans Stadium, the site of the game
Dallas Cowboys (1–12)	Philadelphia Eagles (9–4)
10	20
Head coach: Jimmy Johnson	Head coach: Buddy Ryan
	1	2	3	4	Total
DAL	0	3	7	0	10
PHI	0	17	3	0	20
- Date: December 10, 1989
- Stadium: Veterans Stadium; Philadelphia, Pennsylvania
- Favorite: Philadelphia -12
- Referee: Jerry Seeman

TV in the United States
- Network: CBS
- Announcers: Verne Lundquist and Terry Bradshaw

The second game in the series took place on December 10, 1989, with NFL commissioner Paul Tagliabue in attendance. The game was anticipated as a media event. CBS Sports did a pre-game opening touting the contest as "Bounty Bowl II", complete with wanted posters, the involved players' pictures, and bounty amounts.

During the game, Eagles' fans threw snowballs, ice, and beer onto the field. Several game participants were targeted, including back judge Al Jury and Cowboys punter Mike Saxon (both struck by snowballs), as well as Cowboys coach Jimmy Johnson, who was hit with objects as he was escorted off the field by the Philadelphia Police Department. Television announcers Verne Lundquist and Terry Bradshaw were also pelted with snowballs – Lundquist would claim on-air that he had a dental appointment to treat an abscessed tooth that didn't last as long as that game because of all the interruptions – and Eagles defensive lineman Jerome Brown was struck while standing on the sideline asking fans to cease throwing things.

Eagles fan Edward Rendell later admitted that he was involved in the incident. The then-former Philadelphia district attorney, future mayor of Philadelphia and future governor of Pennsylvania bet another fan $20 that the latter couldn't reach the field with a snowball; Rendell lost.

The Eagles won the game 20–10. As a result of the incident, the Eagles added security and banned beer sales for their last home game of the year against the Phoenix Cardinals and the subsequent NFC wild-card playoff game versus the Los Angeles Rams.

== Aftermath ==
=== Porkchop Bowl ===
A third game in the heated rivalry took place the next season, known as the "Porkchop Bowl". The game got its name because, in the week leading up to the game, Eagles head coach Buddy Ryan choked on a pork chop while out to dinner with offensive coordinator Ted Plumb. Plumb intervened and saved Ryan's life. Philadelphia won this game as well, 21–20.

=== Further coverage ===
In 2008 and on April 11, 2010, the game was included on a list of the ten most memorable moments in the history of Texas Stadium by ESPN.

== See also ==
- New Orleans Saints bounty scandal
- National Football League controversies
- Cowboys–Eagles rivalry
- List of nicknamed NFL games and plays
