= Veterans Stadium =

Multi-purpose venue in Philadelphia

- The Vet
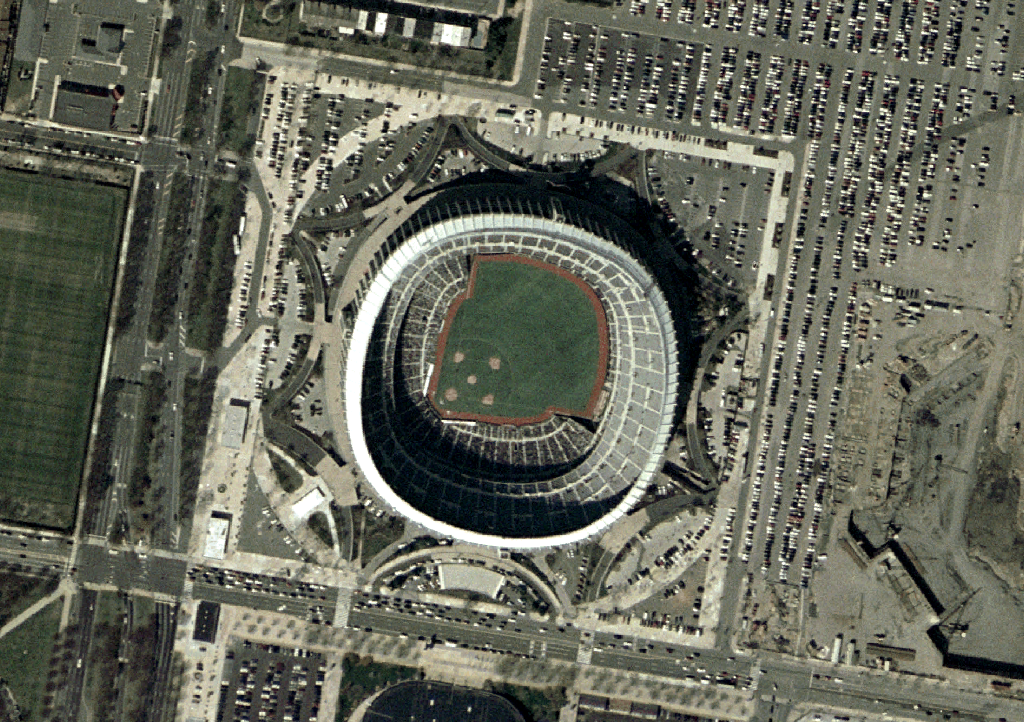
- Aerial view of Veterans Stadium in 2002 with Citizens Bank Park under construction in the lower right
- Interactive map of Veterans Stadium
- Location: 3501 South Broad Street; Philadelphia, Pennsylvania, U.S.
- Coordinates: 39°54′24″N 75°10′16″W
- Owner: City of Philadelphia
- Operator: Philadelphia Department of Recreation
- Capacity: Baseball: 61,831; Football: 65,352
- Surface: AstroTurf (1971–2001); NexTurf (2001–2003)
- Field size: Baseball: Left field – 330 feet (100 meters); Left center field – 371 feet (113 meters); Center field – 408 feet (124 meters); Right center field – 371 feet (113 meters); Right field – 330 feet (100 meters); Backstop – 54 feet (16 meters) (2003)

Construction
- Groundbreaking: October 2, 1967
- Built: 1967–1971
- Opened: April 10, 1971
- Closed: September 28, 2003
- Demolished: March 21, 2004
- Cost: US$63 million ($501 million in 2025 dollars)
- Architects: Hugh Stubbins & Associates; George M. Ewing Co. Stonorov & Haws
- Structural engineer: McCormick Taylor & Associates, Inc.
- General contractors: McCloskey & Co.

Tenants
- Philadelphia Phillies (MLB) (1971–2003); Philadelphia Eagles (NFL) (1971–2002); Philadelphia Atoms (NASL) (1973–1975); Philadelphia Fury (NASL) (1978–1980); Philadelphia Stars (USFL) (1983–1984); Temple Owls (NCAA) (1978–2002)

Pennsylvania Historical Marker
- Designated: September 28, 2005

Veterans Stadium was a multi-purpose stadium in Philadelphia, Pennsylvania, United States, at the northeast corner of Broad Street and Pattison Avenue, part of the South Philadelphia Sports Complex. The seating capacities were 65,358 for football, and 56,371 for baseball.

It hosted the Philadelphia Phillies of Major League Baseball (MLB) from 1971 to 2003 and the Philadelphia Eagles of the National Football League (NFL) from 1971 to 2002. The 1976 and 1996 Major League Baseball All-Star Games were held at the venue. It also hosted the annual Army–Navy football game between 1980 and 2001.

In addition to professional baseball and football, the stadium hosted other amateur and professional sports, large entertainment events, and other civic affairs. It was demolished by implosion in March 2004, being replaced by the adjacent Citizens Bank Park and Lincoln Financial Field. A parking lot now sits on its former site.

== History ==
=== Plans and construction ===
Exterior of Veterans Stadium in the late 1990s

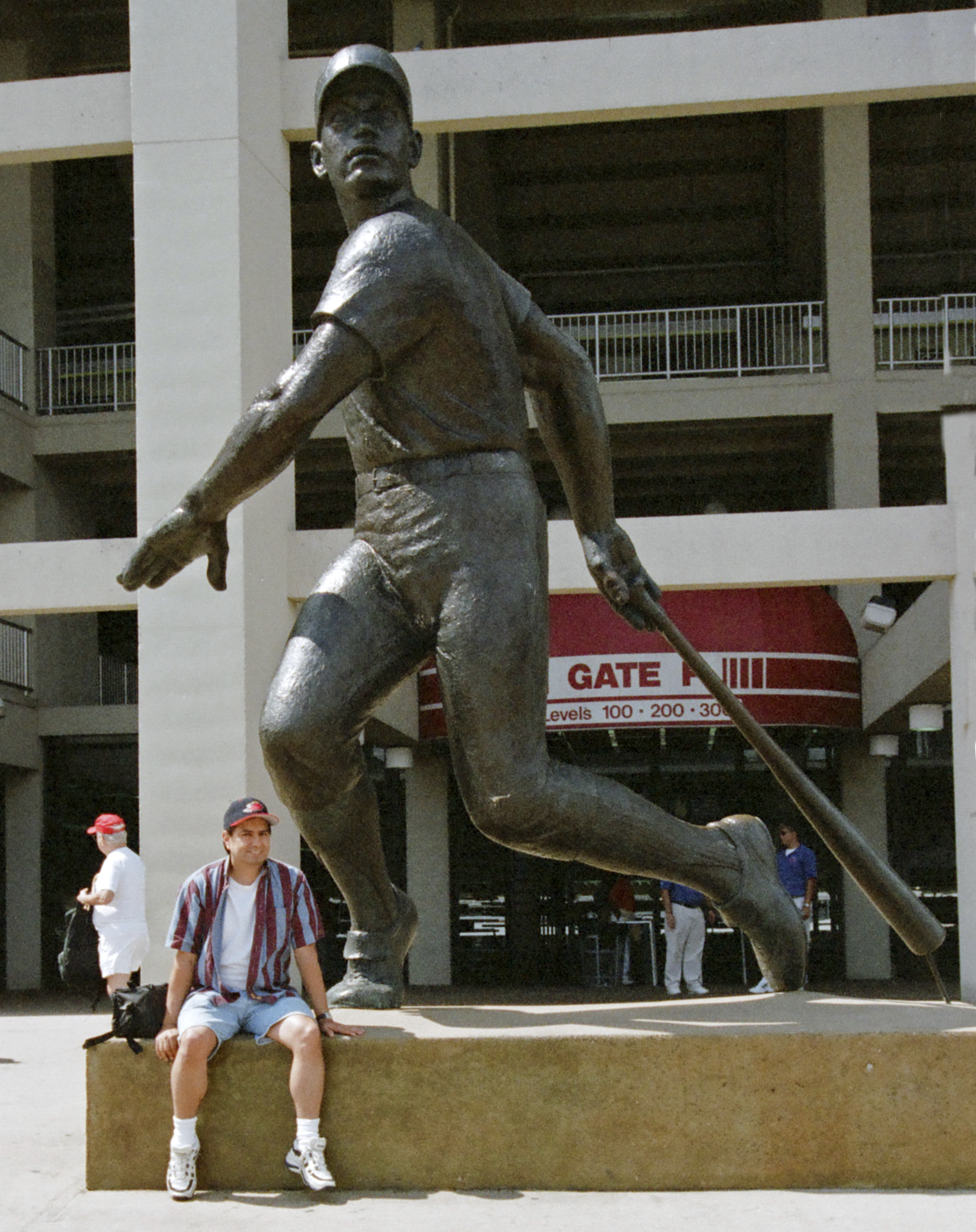
Sculptor Joe Brown's statue outside Veterans Stadium in 1999

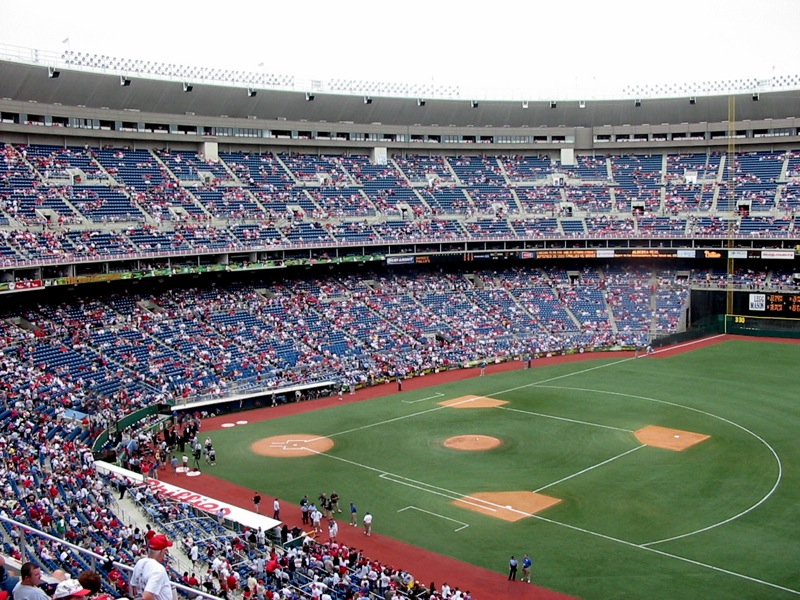
The Philadelphia Phillies' final game at Veterans Stadium on September 28, 2003; in the game, the Phillies lost to the Atlanta Braves 5–2.

In 1959, Phillies owner R. R. M. Carpenter Jr. proposed building a new ballpark for the Philadelphia Phillies on 72 acres (290,000 m^{2}) adjacent to the Garden State Park Racetrack in Cherry Hill, New Jersey. The Phillies were playing at Connie Mack Stadium, a stadium built in 1909 for the Athletics, that was beginning to show its own age, as the Phillies joined the A's in 1938 due to the dilapidation of the Baker Bowl. From 1942 to 1957, fall use by the NFL's Eagles hastened more wear and tear of the stadium than ever expected. Connie Mack Stadium also had inadequate parking; it had been built the year that the Ford Model T was introduced, in an era when fans used the trolley or subway to go to games. Additionally, it was located in an area of the city that had already gone to seed. Indeed, Carpenter had only bought the older park after the 1954 season rather than potentially derail the A's sale and move to Kansas City; at the time, there was no other facility in the Delaware Valley suitable even for temporary use. Also in 1959, alcohol sales at sporting events were banned in Pennsylvania but remained legal across the Delaware River in neighboring South Jersey.

The stadium proposed by Carpenter would have seated 45,000 fans but would be expandable to 60,000, and would have 15,000 parking spaces.

With the American League's A's moving to Kansas City as well as the NBA's Philadelphia Warriors moving to San Francisco to become Golden State in 1962 (quickly replaced with the 76ers moving from Syracuse), Philadelphians dreaded any loss of further teams, or for the teams to depart the city for the suburbs.

=== Financing ===
In 1964, Philadelphia voters approved a US$25-million-bond issue for a new stadium to serve as the home of both the Eagles, who played at the University of Pennsylvania's Franklin Field, and the Phillies. Because of cost overruns, the voters had to go to the polls again in 1967 to approve another $13 million. At a total cost of $60 million, it was at the time one of the most expensive stadiums ever constructed.

=== Naming ===
In 1968, the Philadelphia City Council named the stadium Veterans Stadium in honor of veterans. In December 1969, the Phillies announced that they anticipated that they would play the first month of the 1970 season at Connie Mack Stadium before moving to the new venue. However, the opening was delayed a year because of a combination of bad weather and cost overruns.

=== Structure and design ===
The stadium's design was nearly circular, and was known as an octorad design, which attempted to facilitate both football and baseball. San Diego Stadium in San Diego had been similarly designed. As was the case with other cities where this dual approach was used, such as RFK Stadium in Washington, D.C., Shea Stadium in New York City, the Astrodome in Houston, Atlanta–Fulton County Stadium in Atlanta, Busch Memorial Stadium in St. Louis, Riverfront Stadium in Cincinnati, and Three Rivers Stadium in Pittsburgh, the fundamentally different sizes and shapes of the playing fields made the stadium inadequate to the needs of either sport.

=== Opening ===
The stadium opened with a $3 million scoreboard complex that at the time was the most expensive ever installed.

Prior to its opening, the stadium was blessed by Marine Corps chaplain veteran Francis "Father Foxhole" Kelly.

==== Philadelphia Phillies ====
The Philadelphia Phillies played their first game at the stadium on April 10, 1971, beating the Montreal Expos, 4–1, before an audience of 55,352. The first ball was dropped by helicopter to Phillies back-up catcher Mike Ryan.

Jim Bunning, who was named to the Baseball Hall of Fame in 1996, was the winning pitcher, and Bill Stoneman of the Expos took the loss. Entertainer Mike Douglas, whose daily talk show was taped in Philadelphia, sang "The Star-Spangled Banner" before the game. The emcee for the opening ceremonies was Harry Kalas, the new Phillies play-by-play announcer.

Boots Day opened the game by grounding out to Bunning. Larry Bowa had the stadium's first hit, and Don Money hit the first home run in the stadium.

==== Philadelphia Eagles ====
On September 26, 1971, the Philadelphia Eagles played their first game at Veterans Stadium, hosting the Dallas Cowboys in a game the Eagles lost 42–7. The first Eagles touchdown at the stadium, and the Eagles only points during the game, came from Al Nelson's then-record 102-yard return of a missed field goal by Mike Clark in the fourth quarter.

=== Stadium deterioriation ===
As the stadium aged, its condition deteriorated. A hole in the wall allowed visiting teams' players to peep into the dressing room of the Eagles Cheerleaders. So many mice infested the stadium that the security force employed cats as mousers.

=== Final games ===
==== Philadelphia Eagles ====
The final Eagles game played at Veterans Stadium was the Eagles' 27–10 loss to the Tampa Bay Buccaneers in the 2002 NFC Championship Game on January 19, 2003. The Eagles moved into Lincoln Financial Field in August 2003.

==== Philadelphia Phillies ====
The final game ever played at the stadium was the afternoon of September 28, 2003, a 5–2 Phillies loss to the Atlanta Braves.

The final win at the stadium was recorded by Greg Maddux of the Braves; the final loss at the stadium was recorded by the Phillies' Kevin Millwood. The final Phillies run was scored by Marlon Byrd in the bottom of the 3rd inning, and the final run altogether by the Braves' Andruw Jones on a double by Robert Fick, who also had the last hit at Tiger Stadium while with the Detroit Tigers four years earlier in the top of the 5th.

The final hit at Veterans Stadium was a single by the Phillies' Pat Burrell in the bottom of the 9th inning. The next batter, Chase Utley, grounded into a double play to end the game and Veterans Stadium. A ceremony at Veterans Stadium following the final Phillies game at the stadium pulled at the heartstrings of the sellout crowd. Phillies' former general manager and manager Paul Owens, and Tug McGraw, a former Phillies pitcher, made their final public appearances at the park that day; both men died that winter.

The last publicly broadcast words uttered at Veterans Stadium came from Harry Kalas, who helped open the facility on April 10, 1971, who paraphrased his trademark home run call: "It's on a looooooong drive…IT'S OUTTA HERE!!!"

The following seasons, the Phillies played their first game at the newly constructed Citizens Bank Park on April 12, 2004.

=== Demolition and commemoration ===
On March 21, 2004, the 32-year-old stadium was imploded in 62 seconds. Frank Bardonaro, President of Philadelphia-based AmQuip Crane Rental Company, pressed the "charge" button and then he and Nicholas T Peetros Sr., Project Manager for Driscoll/Hunt Construction Company, pressed the "fire" button to trigger the implosion while Greg Luzinski and the Phillie Phanatic, the Phillies' mascot, pressed a ceremonial plunger for the fans, which did not set off any explosives. A parking lot for the current sporting facilities was constructed in 2004 and 2005 at the site.

On June 6, 2005, the anniversary of World War II's D-Day, a plaque and monument to commemorate the spot where the stadium stood and a memorial for all veterans was dedicated by the Phillies before their game against the Arizona Diamondbacks. On September 28, 2005, the second anniversary of the stadium's final game, a historical marker commemorating where the ballpark once stood was dedicated. In April 2006, granite spaces marking the former locations of home plate, the pitcher's mound, and the three bases for baseball, as well as the goalpost placements for football, were added in Citizens Bank Park's Western Parking Lot U.

Before the stadium's implosion, The Vet's Liberty Bell replica was removed from its perch and placed in storage. In 2019, the bell was installed outside the third base entrance of Citizens Bank Park.

=== Health concerns ===
In the years following demolition, an apparent cancer cluster has emerged among several former Phillies players who played at Veterans Stadium who later developed glioblastoma, a form of brain cancer. Six former Phillies who played while the team called Veterans Stadium home have died of the cancer.

According to a 2013 analysis by The Philadelphia Inquirer, the brain cancer rate of Phillies players while the team was at Veterans Stadium was three times higher than that of the general population. Some of the speculation centers around the possibility that chemicals in the stadium's AstroTurf field may have played a role, but there has been no research to support that theory definitively.

== Seating capacity ==
Baseball
Years	Capacity
1971–1972	56,371
1973–1974	55,730
1975–1976	56,581
1977–1980	58,651
1981–1982	65,454
1983–1984	66,507
1985	66,744
1986	66,271
1987–1989	64,538
1990–1992	62,382
1993	62,586
1994–1995	62,530
1996–1997	62,136
1998–2000	62,363
2001–2003	61,831

Football
Years	Capacity
1971	65,358
1972–1976	65,720
1977–1978	66,052
1979–1982	71,464
1983–1984	72,204
1985	71,640
1986	69,417
1987	66,592
1988–1991	65,356
1992–1993	65,178
1994	64,241
1995–1996	64,899
1997–2003	65,352

== Stadium features ==
Veterans Stadium on opening night for the Philadelphia Phillies in April 1986

The stadium was a complicated structure with its seating layered in seven separate levels in its final configuration. The lowest, or "100 Level", extended only part way around the structure, between roughly the 25-yard lines for football games and near the two dugouts for baseball. The "200 Level" comprised field-level boxes, and the "300 Level" housed what were labeled "Terrace Boxes". These three levels collectively made up the "Lower Stands". The "400 Level" was reserved for the press and dignitaries; the upper level began with "500 Level" (or "loge boxes"), the "600 Level" (upper reserved, or individual seats), and finally, the highest, the "700 Level" (general admission for baseball). Originally, the seats were in shades of brown, terra cotta, orange and yellow, to look like an autumn day, but in 1995 and 1996, blue seats replaced the fall-hued ones.

At one time, the stadium could seat over 71,000 people for football, but restructuring in the late 1980s—including removal of several rows of the 700 Level around most of the stadium to accommodate construction of the Penthouse Suites—brought capacity down to around 66,000.

The stadium was harshly criticized by baseball purists. Even by multipurpose stadium standards, the upper deck was exceptionally high, and many of the seats in that area were so far from the field that it was difficult to see the game without binoculars. Like most of its contemporaries, foul territory was quite roomy. Approximately 70% of the seats were in fair territory, adding to the stadium's cavernous feel. There was no dirt in the infield except for sliding pits around the bases, and circular areas around the pitcher's mound and home plate. In the autumn, the football markings were clearly visible in the spacious outfield area. While the stadium's size enabled the Phillies to shatter previous attendance records, during the years the Phillies were not doing as well, even crowds of 35,000 looked sparse.

The stadium had been known for providing both the Eagles and the Phillies with great home-field advantage. In particular, the acoustics greatly enhanced the crowd noise on the field, making it nearly impossible for opposing players to hear one another.

In his book The Secret Apartment, author Tom Garvey, who managed parking for the stadium, recalls how he spent two years residing in a space at the stadium where he was storing furniture for Eagles tight end Richard Osborne.

=== 700 Level ===
The "700 Level", the highest and cheapest seats at Veterans Stadium, became well known for being home to the loudest, rowdiest fans at Philadelphia Eagles games, and to a lesser extent, Philadelphia Phillies games. In his book If Football's a Religion, Why Don't We Have a Prayer?, Jereé Longman described the 700 Level as having a reputation for "hostile taunting, fighting, public urination and general strangeness." Due to an improvement in public facilities, there is no equivalent in either the current Lincoln Financial Field or Citizens Bank Park. The name has also been the inspiration for websites relating to Philadelphia sports, as well as a weekly "Letters to the Editor" section in the Sunday Sports pages of The Philadelphia Inquirer.

== Playing surface ==
Veterans Stadium during the Eagles' 1980 NFC Championship Game against the Dallas Cowboys on January 11, 1981

The field's surface, originally composed of AstroTurf, contained many gaps and uneven patches. In several places, seams were clearly visible, giving it the nickname "Field of Seams". It perennially drew the ranking of the "NFL's worst field" in player surveys conducted by the NFL Players Association (NFLPA), and visiting players often fell prey to the treacherous conditions resulting in numerous contact and non-contact injuries. The NFLPA reportedly threatened to sue the city for the poor conditions, and many sports agents told the Eagles not to even consider signing or drafting their clients. The Eagles, for their part, complained to the city on numerous occasions about the conditions at the stadium. Baseball players also complained about the surface. It was much harder than other AstroTurf surfaces, and the shock of running on it often caused back pain.

Two of the most-publicized injuries blamed on the playing surface occurred exactly six years apart. On October 10, 1993, Chicago Bears wide receiver Wendell Davis had his cleats caught in a seam while he planted to jump for an underthrown bomb from QB Jim Harbaugh, tearing both of his patella tendons and ending his career, barring a short-lived comeback attempt with the Indianapolis Colts in 1995. On October 10, 1999, Dallas Cowboys wide receiver Michael Irvin suffered a neck injury against the Eagles at Veterans Stadium that proved to be his final play in the NFL and led to his premature retirement.

Long before Davis' and Irvin's injuries, Cleveland Browns standout defensive tackle Jerry Sherk contracted a near-fatal staph infection from the Veterans Stadium turf during a 1979 game. The infection forced him to miss 22 of the Browns' next 23 games and ended a run of nine and a half seasons in the Browns' starting lineup. Sherk never started again and retired in 1981.

In 2001, the original AstroTurf was eventually replaced by a new surface, NexTurf. It was far softer, and reportedly much easier on the knees. However, the city crew that installed the new turf reportedly did not install it properly, resulting in seams being visible in several places.

The first football game on the new turf was scheduled to take place on August 13, 2001, when the Eagles were to play the Baltimore Ravens in a preseason game. However, Ravens coach Brian Billick refused to let the Ravens take the field for warm-ups when he discovered a trench around an area where third base was covered up by a NexTurf cutout. City crews unsuccessfully tried to fix the problem, forcing the game to be canceled. Later, players from both teams reported that they sank into the turf in locations near the infield cutouts. The Eagles' team president Joe Banner was irate after the game, calling the stadium's conditions "absolutely unacceptable" and "an embarrassment to the city of Philadelphia." City officials, however, promised that the stadium would be suitable for play when the regular season started.

The problem was caused by heavy rain over the weekend prior to the game, which made the dirt in the sliding pits and pitcher's mound so soft that the cutouts covering them in the football configuration became mushy and uneven. Even when new dirt was shoveled on top, it quickly became just as saturated as the old dirt. The problem was solved by using asphalt hot mix, which allowed for a solid, level playing surface, but required a jackhammer for removal whenever the stadium was converted from football back to baseball (between August and October of each year).

In March 2023, investigative reporters from the Philadelphia Inquirer bought souvenir samples of the old Veterans Stadium AstroTurf used from 1977 to 1981 and commissioned diagnostics through the Eurofins Environmental Testing laboratory. The resulting lab report linked per- and polyfluoroalkyl substances (PFAS, also known as "forever chemicals") to the turf. Six former Phillies who played at Veterans Stadium have died from glioblastoma, an aggressive brain cancer: Tug McGraw, Darren Daulton, John Vukovich, Johnny Oates, Ken Brett, and David West.

== Fans ==
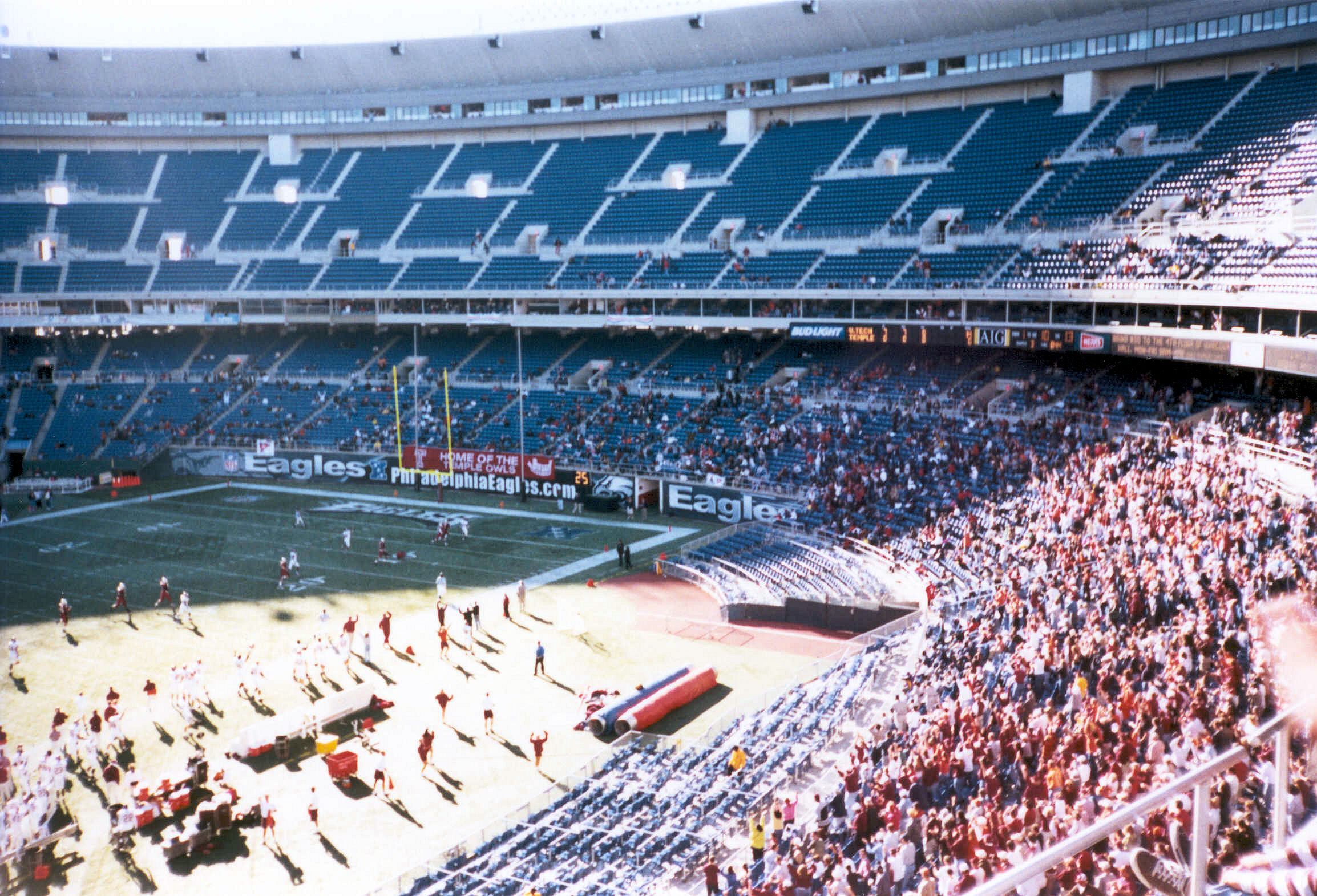
Virginia Tech and Temple play at Veterans Stadium in 2001

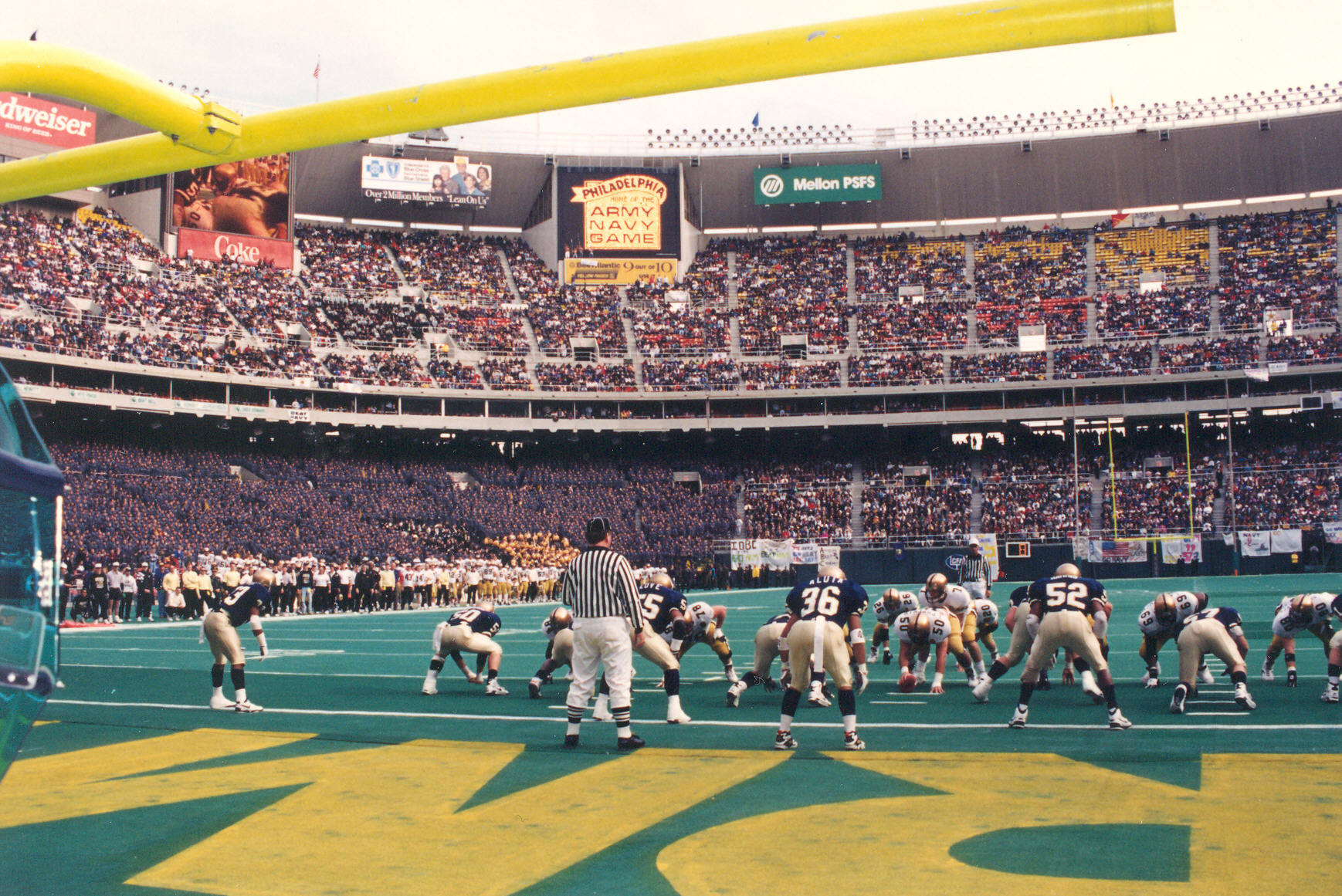
The 1994 Army–Navy Game at Veterans Stadium

Particularly rowdy fans at Veterans Stadium, especially for Philadelphia Eagles games, were found in the notorious 700 Level, the highest seating level at Veterans Stadium prior to the construction of luxury skyboxes behind that seating area. The stadium was known for the Eagles fans.

One of the more well-known examples of the fans' behavior was during the 1989 season at a follow-up game to what many called the "Bounty Bowl". On Thanksgiving day, November 23, 1989, the Eagles had defeated the Dallas Cowboys at Texas Stadium, 27–0. In that game, Cowboys placekicker Luis Zendejas suffered a concussion during a rough block by linebacker Jessie Small after a kickoff. After the game, Cowboys rookie head coach Jimmy Johnson commented that Eagles head coach Buddy Ryan instituted a bounty on Zendejas and Cowboys quarterback Troy Aikman. Two weeks later, on December 10, they played the rematch dubbed "Bounty Bowl II" at the stadium which the Eagles won 20–10. The stadium seats were covered with snow in the stands. The volatile mix of beer, the "bounty" and the intense hatred for "America's Team" (who finished 1–15 that season) led to fans throwing snowballs at Dallas players and coaches. Beer sales were banned after that incident for two games. A similar incident in 1995 at Giants Stadium during a nationally telecast San Diego Chargers–New York Giants game led the NFL to rule that seating areas must be cleared of snow within a certain time period before kickoff.

The Eagles fans' behavior during a 24–12 Monday Night Football loss to the San Francisco 49ers in 1997 and a 34–0 loss to Dallas a year later was such that the City of Philadelphia assigned a Municipal Court Judge, Seamus McCaffery, to the stadium on game days to deal with fans removed from the stands in what was referred to as "Eagles Court". Judge McCaffery would hold court in the stadium until the stadium's closure in 2003; the Eagles' replacement stadium, Lincoln Financial Field, does not have a court, but a holding cell instead. Two years later, fans threw D-Cell batteries at St. Louis Cardinals outfielder J. D. Drew after he spurned the Phillies' offer to play with them, and wound up going back into the draft and picked by the Cardinals.

== Notable games and incidents ==
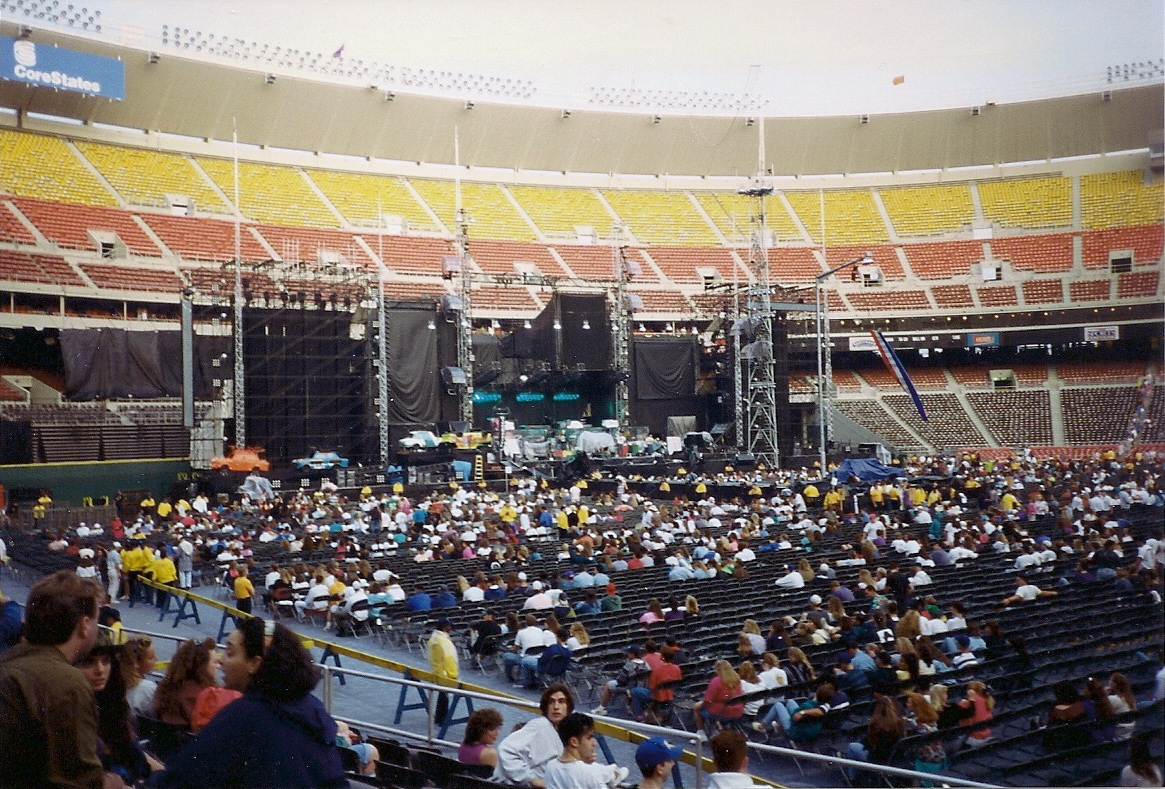
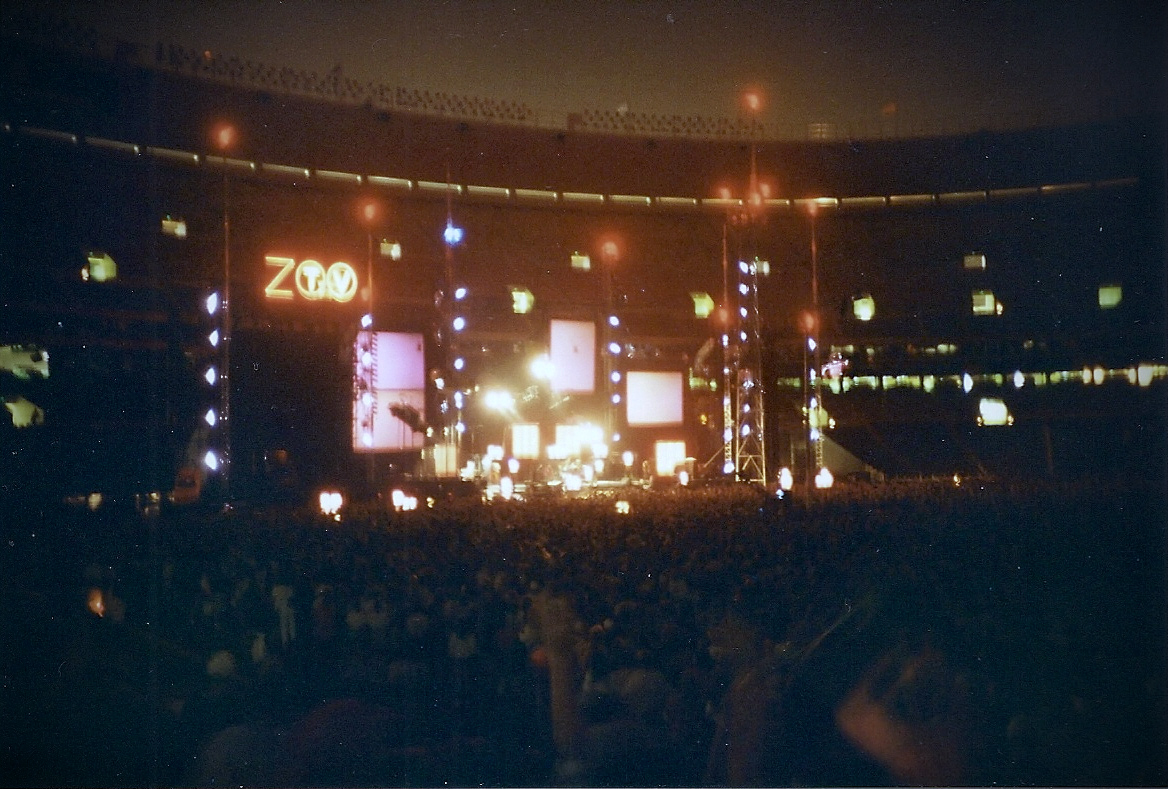
Veterans Stadium before and during one of U2's Zoo TV Tour shows in 1992
- On June 25, 1971, Willie Stargell of the Pittsburgh Pirates hit the longest home run in stadium history in a 14–4 Pirates win over the Phillies. The spot where the ball landed was marked with a yellow star with a black "S" inside a white circle until Stargell's 2001 death, when the white circle was painted black. The star remained until the stadium's 2004 demolition.
- One of the most notable events in the stadium's history was Game 6 of the 1980 World Series on October 21. In the game, the Phillies clinched their first world championship with a 4–1 victory over the Kansas City Royals in front of 65,838 fans. Tug McGraw's series-ending strikeout of the Royals' Willie Wilson was instrumental in their win.
- One of the most notable Eagles games at the stadium, which occurred less than three months after the Phillies won the 1980 World Series, was Eagles 20–7 victory over the Dallas Cowboys in the 1980 NFC Championship Game, played before 70,696 fans at the stadium on January 11, 1981. As a psychological ploy, the Eagles chose to wear their white jerseys for their home game in order to force the Cowboys into their "unlucky" blue jerseys. At the end of the game, Philadelphia police circled the field with horses and dogs as they had done for the Phillies' World Series victory; despite the police presence, Eagles fans successfully rushed the field.
- Veterans Stadium was host to the latest-finishing game in baseball history, a twinight double-header between the Phillies and San Diego Padres that started on July 2, 1993, at 5:05 pm and ended at 4:40 am the following morning. The two games were interrupted multiple times by rain showers. The Phillies lost the first game, 5–2, and faced a 5–0 deficit in the second game before rallying for a come-from-behind victory in the tenth inning on a walk-off RBI single by closing pitcher Mitch Williams. The second game ended with an estimated 6,000 fans at the ballpark.
- The Phillies clinched the NLCS at the stadium twice: the first in 1983 over area-born Tommy Lasorda and the Los Angeles Dodgers, and the second in the 1993 NLCS over future divisional rivals the Atlanta Braves. The 1993 season was the last LCS under the two-division League format.
- The Phillies pitched two no-hit games at the stadium, the only nine-inning no-hitters in stadium history. Both were against the San Francisco Giants. Terry Mulholland pitched the first on August 15, 1990, in a 6–0 Phillies win. Kevin Millwood pitched the second on April 27, 2003, and beat the Giants 1–0, upstaging the Phillie Phanatic's birthday promotion that afternoon. The Montreal Expos' Pascual Pérez pitched a five-inning no-hitter shortened by rain on September 24, 1988. MLB changed its rules in 1991 to require that fully recognized no-hitters—past, present and future—be complete games of at least nine innings.
- Another game that is well-remembered by Eagles fans was known as the "Body Bag Game", which took place on November 12, 1990, when the Washington Redskins visited the stadium for a Monday Night Football game. Eagles' head coach Buddy Ryan was quoted as saying that the Redskins' offense would "have to be carted off in body bags." The Eagles' number-one defense scored two touchdowns in a 28–14 Eagles win in which the Eagles knocked nine players with the Redskins out of the game, including their first and second-string quarterbacks. The Redskins were forced to finish the game using running back/returner Brian Mitchell at quarterback.
- During the 1998 Army–Navy Game, a serious accident occurred when a support rail collapsed and eight West Point cadets were injured, which intensified calls for new stadiums for football and baseball in Philadelphia.
- From 1979 into 1981, Tom Garvey, a stadium parking lot supervisor, Vietnam War veteran and friend of Phillies and Eagles players, lived semi-secretly (known to 25-30 people) under 300-level seats at the stadium.

== Other stadium events ==
=== Amateur baseball ===
From 1970 to 1987, the Cape Cod Baseball League (CCBL) played its annual all-star game at various major league stadiums. The games were interleague contests between the CCBL and the Atlantic Collegiate Baseball League (ACBL). The 1984 game was played at Veterans Stadium. The CCBL won the game 7–3 behind the performance of winning pitcher and future major leaguer Joe Magrane of the University of Arizona.

The Liberty Bell Classic, Philadelphia Division I college baseball tournament, was played at the stadium from its inception in 1992 through 2003. The original eight schools were:

- Drexel University (Drexel Dragons)
- La Salle University (La Salle Explorers)
- Saint Joseph's University (the Hawks)
- Temple University (Temple Owls)
- University of Delaware (Delaware Fightin' Blue Hens)
- University of Pennsylvania (Penn Quakers)
- Villanova University (Villanova Wildcats)
- West Chester University (West Chester Golden Rams)

In the first championship game in 1992, the University of Delaware defeated Villanova 6–2.

The stadium hosted the 1998 Atlantic 10 Conference baseball tournament, won by Fordham.

=== Minor league baseball ===
In November 1987, the new owners of the Phillies AAA franchise, the Maine Guides, considered playing the 1988 season at the Vet because Lackawanna County Stadium would not be ready until the 1989 season. The team would have had to play 12:35 pm day games when the Phillies had night games scheduled at the Vet. Ownership elected to remain in Old Orchard Beach for 1988, renamed the club the 'Maine Phillies', and moved to Moosic, Pennsylvania in 1989 as the Scranton/Wilkes-Barre Red Barons.

The Eastern League Trenton Thunder played two home games at the stadium in April 1994. The Thunder beat the Canton–Akron Indians, 10–9, in front of 483 fans on April 20, 1994, and won 9–3 on April 21. Future Phillies broadcaster Tom McCarthy was in the booth for the Thunder during these two games.

=== Soccer ===
The stadium was the home field for the Philadelphia Atoms and the Philadelphia Fury, both North American Soccer League teams. The Fury drew 18,191 fans for their April 1, 1978, opener at the stadium which they lost 3–0 to the Washington Diplomats. The Fury averaged 8,279 per-match in 1978 NASL, 5,624 per-match in 1979 NASL, and 4,778 in the 1980 NASL seasons. The club was moved to Montreal in 1981 NASL season.

The stadium hosted an exhibition match on August 2, 1991, between the U.S. National Team and English professional soccer club Sheffield Wednesday F.C. John Harkes played for Wednesday, the first American to play in the English Premier League. 44,261 fans saw the U.S. score two second-half goals to defeat Sheffield Wednesday 2–0.

Philadelphia established a bid committee to host matches for the 1994 World Cup which was to be played in the United States. Phillies president Bill Giles was on the Philadelphia bid committee and hoped to use Veterans Stadium for games. In addition to the challenge of installing a natural grass field for the games, FIFA would have required the Phillies to vacate the stadium for a month to allow for sufficient preparation time prior to the matches. Giles could only offer 17-days. The nine venues eventually chosen to host matches were all stadiums that did not host baseball games.

Date	Winning Team	Result	Losing Team	Tournament	Spectators
August 2, 1991	United States	2–0	(England) Sheffield Wednesday	International friendly	44,261

=== Professional softball ===
The Philadelphia Athletics of the American Professional Slo-Pitch League (APSPL) played their 1978 seasons at Veterans Stadium.

=== College Football ===
Veterans Stadium was the home of the Temple Owls from 1978 to 2002.

Additionally, Veterans Stadium was host to 17 Army-Navy Contests between 1980 and 2001, with Navy winning the first of these on November 29, 1980 by a score of 33-6, and Army winning the last, on December 1, 2001, by a score of 26-17.

Veterans Stadium also played occasional host to one-off college football games; for example, on October 30, 1993, Notre Dame defeated Navy 58-27.

=== United States Football League / Philadelphia Stars ===
The Philadelphia Stars of the United States Football League (USFL) played all of their 1983 home games and all of their 1984 regular season home games at Veterans Stadium. Their two 1984 playoff games were moved to Franklin Field because of scheduling conflicts with the Philadelphia Phillies. The Philadelphia Stars all-time record at Veterans Stadium was 17-2, making them - by far - the winningest team to call Veterans Stadium home by winning percentage (0.895). Their only two losses came on March 27, 1983 - a 27-22 loss to the Tampa Bay Bandits in their second game ever in Philadelphia - and on June 24, 1984 to the New Jersey Generals - their last game at Veterans Stadium. This latter contest was the final game of the Stars' 1984 regular season, and represented only their second loss of the season - both to the New Jersey Generals. The Stars would prevail, however, six days later over the New Jersey Generals at Franklin Field in a Divisional playoff game, by a score of 28-7.

On July 9, 1983, Veterans Stadium played host to one of the most remarkable comebacks in a professional football playoff game ever to occur. With 12:04 to play, the Chicago Blitz held a seemingly safe 38-17 lead. The Stars scored a touchdown with 9:29, were able to intercept Chicago with a little over 7:00 remaining and scored a touchdown on the ensuing possession with 4:59 to play, forced a Chicago punt on the Blitz's next possession and took possession of the ball again shortly before the 2:00 warning, then scored a game-tying touchdown and extra point with fifty seconds remaining in regulation. The Stars completed the comeback with a one yard walkoff touchdown run by Kelvin Bryant without ever surrendering possession of the ball in the overtime period.

=== High school football ===
Veterans Stadium hosted Philadelphia's City Title high-school football championship game from 1973 to 1977 and in 1979. The series was suspended in 1980. With the entry of the Philadelphia Catholic League into what is now PIAA District XII (which was formed when the Public League joined the PIAA in 2002), the "City Title Game" was restored in 2008.

=== Professional wrestling ===
The only professional wrestling event held in Veterans Stadium was NWA/Jim Crockett Promotions The Great American Bash on July 1, 1986, with an attendance of 10,900. The event was the start of a 14-city summer tour.

=== Concerts ===
Date	Artist	Opening act(s)	Tour / Concert name	Attendance	Revenue	Notes
August 10, 1974	Crosby, Stills, Nash & Young	The Band	CSNY 1974	–	–	
August 14, 1985	Bruce Springsteen & The E Street Band	–	Born in the U.S.A. Tour	108,000 / 108,000	–	
August 15, 1985	Bruce Springsteen & The E Street Band	–	Born in the U.S.A. Tour	108,000 / 108,000	–	
September 8, 1985	Wham!	Chaka Khan; Katrina and the Waves	Whamamerica!	43,000 / 50,000	$698,000	
May 28, 1987	Genesis	Paul Young	Invisible Touch Tour	–	–	
May 29, 1987	Genesis	Paul Young	Invisible Touch Tour	–	–	
July 11, 1987	Madonna	Level 42	Who's That Girl World Tour	48,182 / 51,500	$969,815	
July 30, 1987	David Bowie	Squeeze	Glass Spider Tour	–	–	
July 31, 1987	David Bowie	Squeeze	Glass Spider Tour	–	–	
May 15, 1988	Pink Floyd	–	A Momentary Lapse of Reason Tour	88,010 / 95,800	$1,917,675	
May 16, 1988	Pink Floyd	–	A Momentary Lapse of Reason Tour	88,010 / 95,800	$1,917,675	
July 9, 1989	The Who	–	The Who Tour 1989	–	–	
July 10, 1989	The Who	–	The Who Tour 1989	–	–	
August 31, 1989	The Rolling Stones	Living Colour	Steel Wheels Tour	110,556 / 110,556	$3,181,143	
September 1, 1989	The Rolling Stones	Living Colour	Steel Wheels Tour	110,556 / 110,556	$3,181,143	
July 14, 1990	Paul McCartney	–	The Paul McCartney World Tour	102,695 / 102,695	$3,107,980	
July 15, 1990	Paul McCartney	–	The Paul McCartney World Tour	102,695 / 102,695	$3,107,980	
September 15, 1990	MC Hammer	After 7 Michel'le; Oaktown's 3.5.7	Please Hammer Don't Hurt 'Em World Tour			
May 31, 1992	Genesis	–	We Can't Dance Tour	97,774 / 97,774	$1,518,080	
June 1, 1992	Genesis	–	We Can't Dance Tour	97,774 / 97,774	$1,518,080	
September 2, 1992	U2	Primus; The Disposable Heroes of Hiphoprisy	Zoo TV Tour	88,684 / 88,684	$2,691,880	
September 3, 1992	U2	Primus; The Disposable Heroes of Hiphoprisy	Zoo TV Tour	88,684 / 88,684	$2,691,880	
June 13, 1993	Paul McCartney	–	The New World Tour	45,711 / 45,711	$1,288,394	
June 2, 1994	Pink Floyd	–	The Division Bell Tour	152,264 / 152,264	$5,091,120	
June 3, 1994	Pink Floyd	–	The Division Bell Tour	152,264 / 152,264	$5,091,120	
June 4, 1994	Pink Floyd	–	The Division Bell Tour	152,264 / 152,264	$5,091,120	
July 8, 1994	Elton John; Billy Joel	–	Face to Face 1994	150,511 / 150,511	$7,315,495	
July 9, 1994	Elton John; Billy Joel	–	Face to Face 1994	150,511 / 150,511	$7,315,495	
July 12, 1994	Elton John; Billy Joel	–	Face to Face 1994	150,511 / 150,511	$7,315,495	
September 22, 1994	The Rolling Stones	Blind Melon	Voodoo Lounge Tour	80,976 / 80,976	$3,818,719	
September 23, 1994	The Rolling Stones	Blind Melon	Voodoo Lounge Tour	80,976 / 80,976	$3,818,719	
October 12, 1997	The Rolling Stones	Blues Traveler	Bridges to Babylon Tour	56,651 / 56,651	$3,275,572	
May 20, 1999	Dave Matthews Band	Santana; The Roots	Summer Tour 1999	–	–	
May 21, 1999	Dave Matthews Band	Santana; The Roots	Summer Tour 1999	–	–	
May 22, 1999	Dave Matthews Band	Santana; The Roots	Summer Tour 1999	–	–	
July 15, 2000	Dave Matthews Band	Ozomatli; Ben Harper & the Innocent Criminals	Summer Tour 2000	–	–	
July 16, 2000	Dave Matthews Band	Ozomatli; Ben Harper & the Innocent Criminals	Summer Tour 2000	–	–	
June 13, 2001	NSYNC	BBMak	PopOdyssey	46,005 / 54,212	$2,534,204	
September 18, 2002	The Rolling Stones	The Pretenders	Licks Tour	–	–	
July 12, 2003	Metallica	Limp Bizkit; Linkin Park; Deftones; Mudvayne	Summer Sanitarium Tour	–	–	
July 26, 2003	Bon Jovi	Sheryl Crow; Goo Goo Dolls	Bounce Tour	–	–	The stadium's final concert.

=== Other events ===
The venue also played host to religious events including annual Jehovah's Witnesses conventions, which was open to the public each year it took place. It also played host to a Billy Graham crusade in 1992; the crusade was held on the same day that the Eagles' Jerome Brown was killed in a vehicular crash and Reggie White, who was invited to speak at the event, broke the news to the gathered crowd.

== Photo gallery ==
Home plate at Veterans Stadium, home to the Philadelphia Phillies for 33 seasons, is remembered with this granite and bronze marker in the parking lot near Citizens Bank Park. (2006)

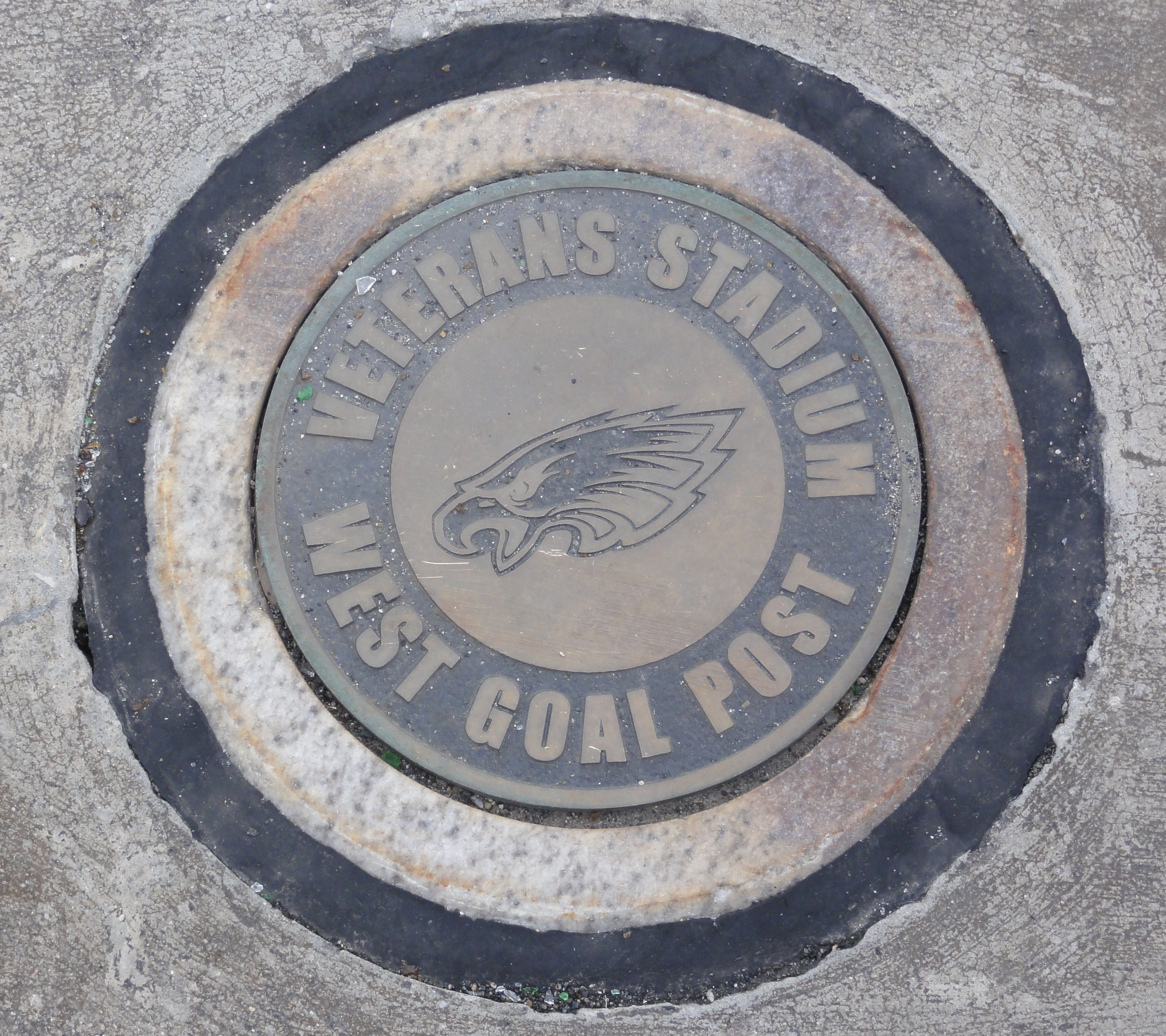
The mounting point for Veterans Stadium's west end zone goalpost, used by the Philadelphia Eagles for 32 seasons, is marked in the same parking lot (the east goalpost is similarly marked). (2011)

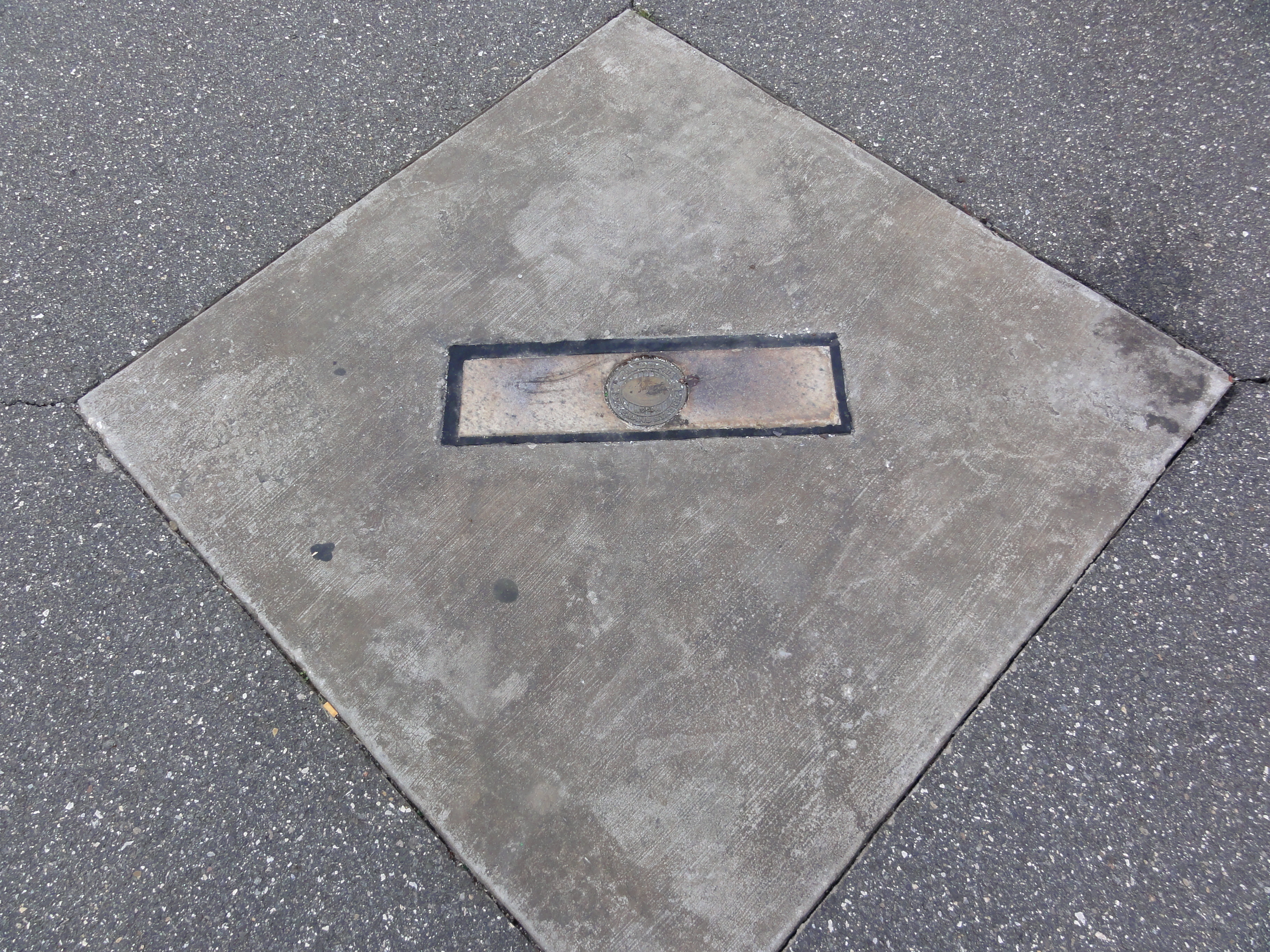
Veterans Stadium's pitching mound is marked. (2011)

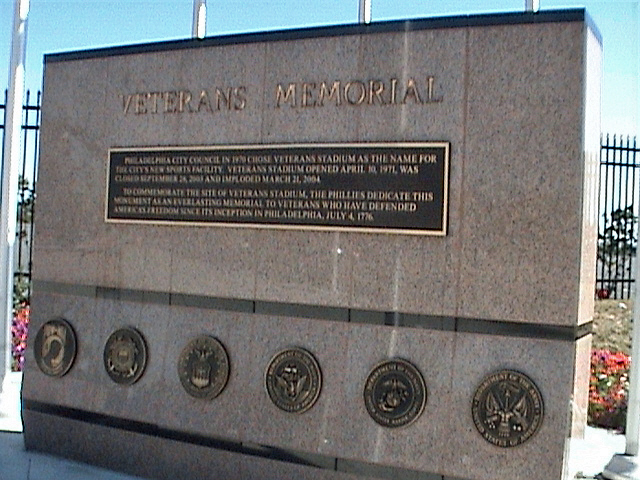
A brief history of how the stadium was named and a tribute to veterans of all wars is on display outside where the stadium stood. (2006)

The historic marker shows the stadium's major moments. (2007)

Dedication plaque that once was attached to The Vet (2007)

Events and tenants
Preceded by Franklin Field	Home of the Philadelphia Eagles; 1971–2002	Succeeded by Lincoln Financial Field
Preceded by Connie Mack Stadium	Home of the Philadelphia Phillies; 1971–2003	Succeeded by Citizens Bank Park
Preceded by Temple Stadium	Home of the Temple Owls; 1978–2002	Succeeded by Lincoln Financial Field
Preceded by Milwaukee County Stadium; The Ballpark in Arlington	Host of the All-Star Game; 1976; 1996	Succeeded by Yankee Stadium; Jacobs Field
Preceded by Tampa Stadium; Edward Jones Dome	Host of NFC Championship Game; 1981; 2003	Succeeded by Candlestick Park; Lincoln Financial Field
