= Anthony Toney =

American football player (born 1962)

No. 25
- Position: Running back

Personal information
- Born: September 23, 1962 (age 64); Salinas, California, U.S.
- Listed height: 6 ft 2 in (1.88 m)
- Listed weight: 227 lb (103 kg)

Career information
- High school: North Salinas
- College: Texas A&M
- NFL draft: 1986: 2nd round, 37th overall pick

Career history
- Philadelphia Eagles (1986–1990); San Francisco 49ers (1992)*
- * Offseason or practice squad member only

Career NFL statistics
- Rushing yards: 2,294
- Rushing average: 3.6
- Total touchdowns: 19
- Stats at Pro Football Reference

Anthony Toney (born September 23, 1962) is an American former professional football player who was a running back for five seasons with the Philadelphia Eagles of the National Football League (NFL). He played college football for the Texas A&M Aggies and was selected by the Eagles in the second round of the 1986 NFL draft.

== NFL career statistics ==
Legend
**Bold**	Career high

=== Regular season ===
Year	Team	Games		Rushing					Receiving				
Year	Team	GP	GS	Att	Yds	Avg	Lng	TD	Rec	Yds	Avg	Lng	TD
1986	PHI	12	5	69	285	**4.1**	43	1	13	177	**13.6**	**47**	0
1987	PHI	11	11	127	473	3.7	36	**5**	**39**	**341**	8.7	33	1
1988	PHI	**15**	13	139	502	3.6	20	4	34	256	7.5	24	1
1989	PHI	14	**14**	**172**	**582**	3.4	**44**	3	19	124	6.5	15	0
1990	PHI	**15**	11	132	452	3.4	20	1	17	133	7.8	32	**3**
Career		67	54	639	2,294	3.6	44	14	122	1,031	8.5	47	5

=== Playoffs ===
Year	Team	Games		Rushing					Receiving				
Year	Team	GP	GS	Att	Yds	Avg	Lng	TD	Rec	Yds	Avg	Lng	TD
1988	PHI	**1**	**1**	**5**	3	0.6	3	0	2	9	4.5	7	0
1989	PHI	**1**	**1**	**5**	**12**	**2.4**	**5**	**1**	**4**	**35**	**8.8**	**20**	0
1990	PHI	**1**	0	2	3	1.5	2	0	0	0	0.0	0	0
Career		3	2	12	18	1.5	5	1	6	44	7.3	20	0
