= Scott Ankrom =

American football player (born 1966)

No. 81
- Position: Wide receiver

Personal information
- Born: January 4, 1966 (age 60); San Antonio, Texas, U.S.
- Listed height: 6 ft 1 in (1.85 m)
- Listed weight: 194 lb (88 kg)

Career information
- High school: John Jay (San Antonio)
- College: TCU
- NFL draft: 1989: 12th round, 308th overall pick

Career history
- Dallas Cowboys (1989–1990)

Career NFL statistics
- Games played: 10
- Stats at Pro Football Reference

Scott Randall Ankrom (born January 4, 1966) is an American former professional football player who was a wide receiver in the National Football League (NFL) for the Dallas Cowboys. He played college football for the TCU Horned Frogs.

== Early life ==
Ankron attended John Jay High School where he was an All-American quarterback. He also excelled in track, winning several 100 metres, 200 metres and 4 × 100 metres relay competitions. His 200 metres district record lasted for 24 years until it was broken in April 2007.

In basketball, he was the starting point guard and guided his team to a district championship and a regional final. He was the starting center fielder in baseball.

== College career ==
Ankron accepted a football scholarship to play for Texas Christian University under head coach Jim Wacker. He was recruited as an athlete, so he was initially used in different positions. In 1984, he set an NCAA record with a 99-yard touchdown pass against Rice University. He also had 14 tackles and one interception while playing on defense.

In 1985, he started the first 4 games at quarterback, but was lost for the year after tearing ligaments in his left ankle during the 0-41 loss against the University of Arkansas.

In 1986, he was redshirted after suffering a muscle pull in the second game against Kansas State University. In 1987, he suffered a season-ending injury in the first game against Boston College.

In 1988, he played quarterback, wide receiver, running back and special teams. Against Bowling Green State University, he started the game by registering 106 rushing yards as a running back and switched to quarterback in the second half, completing 4 of 7 passes for 50 yards, while leading his team to 3 touchdowns. He posted 112 rushing yards rushing against Baylor University. He finished the season with 639 rushing yards (second on the team), 377 passing yards (second on the team), 6 rushing touchdowns (led the team) and one passing touchdown.

== Professional career ==
Ankrom was selected by the Dallas Cowboys in the 12th round (308th overall) of the 1989 NFL draft, with the intention of using him as a wide receiver and kickoff returner. On August 26, he injured his left knee while playing an exhibition game against the Denver Broncos, which became an injury that eventually would end his career. He made the team as a rookie, spending his time between the active roster and the practice squad. He was also named the emergency third-string quarterback after Troy Aikman missed games with a broken index finger. He finished third on the team in special teams tackles, despite missing 6 games after undergoing arthroscopic surgery.

In 1990 he was moved to safety, but suffered a season ending left knee injury in preseason and was placed on the injured reserve list on August 26. He retired after not being be able to recover from the injury.
