= Eric Brown (defensive back, born 1967) =

American football player (born 1967)

No. 33
- Positions: Cornerback, safety

Personal information
- Born: April 12, 1967 (age 59); U.S.
- Listed height: 5 ft 11 in (1.80 m)
- Listed weight: 177 lb (80 kg)

Career information
- High school: Savannah (Savannah, Georgia)
- College: Savannah State
- NFL draft: 1989: undrafted

Career history
- Dallas Cowboys (1989)

Awards and highlights
- 2× First-team All-SIAC (1987, 1988)
- Stats at Pro Football Reference

Eric Brown (born April 12, 1967) is an American former professional football defensive back who played for the Dallas Cowboys of the National Football League (NFL). He played college football for the Savannah State Tigers.

== Early life ==
Eric Brown was born on April 12, 1967, in the United States. He attended Savannah High School in Savannah, Georgia.

== College career ==
Brown played college football for the Savannah State Tigers. On November 12, 1987, it was reported that he had been named the Southern Intercollegiate Athletic Conference (SIAC) defensive player of the week after recording six tackles, seven pass breakups, and three interceptions (one of which he returned for a 67-yard touchdown) in a 26–7 victory against Fort Valley State. He earned first-team All-SIAC honors at cornerback for the 1987 season. On October 17, 1988, the The Atlanta Constitution noted that Brown had 14 interceptions in the past 17 games. He was named first-team All-SIAC at cornerback for the second year.

== Professional career ==
After going undrafted in the 1989 NFL draft, Brown signed with the Dallas Cowboys. He was waived on August 29 and signed to the practice squad on September 5. He was promoted to the active roster on September 27 and made his NFL debut on October 1 against the New York Giants in a reserve role. He was listed as a cornerback/safety. Brown was placed on injured reserve on October 5 with a strained left hamstring. He became a free agent after the 1989 season and was not re-signed.
