= Joe Mickles =

American football player (born 1965)

No. 30, 36, 34, 43
- Position: Running back

Personal information
- Born: December 25, 1965 (age 60); Birmingham, Alabama, U.S.
- Listed height: 5 ft 10 in (1.78 m)
- Listed weight: 221 lb (100 kg)

Career information
- High school: Gardendale (Gardendale, Alabama)
- College: Ole Miss
- NFL draft: 1989: 12th round, 317th overall pick

Career history
- Washington Redskins (1989); San Diego Chargers (1990); Barcelona Dragons (1992); Washington Redskins (1992); Barcelona Dragons 1995); Scottish Claymores (1995)
- Stats at Pro Football Reference

Joseph Nathan Mickles (born December 25, 1965) is an American former professional football running back. He played in the National Football League (NFL) for the Washington Redskins in the 1989 NFL season and the San Diego Chargers in the 1990 season. He played college football at the University of Mississippi from 1985 to 1988 and scored a touchdown in the team's 20–17 win over Texas Tech in the 1986 Independence Bowl. He was drafted in the twelfth round of the 1989 NFL draft.
