= Buddy Ryan =

American football player, coach, and executive (1931–2016)

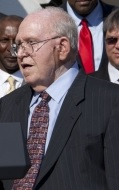
- Ryan at the White House in 2011

Personal information
- Born: February 17, 1931; Frederick, Oklahoma, U.S.
- Died: June 28, 2016 (aged 85); Shelbyville, Kentucky, U.S.

Career information
- College: Oklahoma State

Career history

Coaching
- Gainesville HS (TX) (1957–1958) Assistant coach; Gainesville HS (TX) (1959) Head coach; Marshall HS (TX) (1960) Assistant coach; Buffalo (1961–1965) Defensive line coach; Pacific (1966) Defensive line coach; Vanderbilt (1967) Defensive line coach; New York Jets (1968–1975) Defensive line coach; Minnesota Vikings (1976–1977) Defensive line coach; Chicago Bears (1978–1985) Defensive coordinator; Philadelphia Eagles (1986–1990) Head coach; Houston Oilers (1993) Defensive coordinator; Arizona Cardinals (1994–1995) Head coach

Operations
- Arizona Cardinals (1994–1995) General manager

Awards and highlights
- As assistant coach: 2× Super Bowl champion (III, XX)

Head coaching record
- Regular season: 55–55–1 (.500)
- Postseason: 0–3 (.000)
- Career: 55–58–1 (.487)
- Coaching profile at Pro Football Reference
- Executive profile at Pro Football Reference

James David "Buddy" Ryan (February 17, 1931 – June 28, 2016) was an American football coach in the National Football League (NFL) and American Football League (AFL). During his 35-season coaching career, Ryan served as the head coach of the Philadelphia Eagles from 1986 to 1990, and of the Arizona Cardinals from 1994 to 1995. Ryan also served as the defensive coordinator of the Chicago Bears from 1978 to 1985, and of the Houston Oilers in 1993. Coaching multiple Hall of Fame defensive players throughout his career, Ryan is considered by many to be one of the greatest defensive minds in the history of American football.

Ryan began his professional coaching career as the defensive line coach for the New York Jets of the AFL for the team's Super Bowl III victory. He became the defensive line coach for the Minnesota Vikings, overseeing the Purple People Eaters. He then became the defensive coordinator of the Chicago Bears, who won Super Bowl XX. As defensive coordinator of the Bears, he is credited with creating the 46 defense, and the 1985 team led the league in nearly all defensive statistical categories. Ryan then coached the Eagles, served as defensive coordinator of the Oilers, and coached the Cardinals. He was the father of NFL coaches Rex Ryan and Rob Ryan.

== Early life ==
Ryan was born on February 17, 1931, and raised in a "small, agricultural-based community" outside of Frederick, Oklahoma. His obituary in The New York Times references the confusion about the year Ryan was born: "His birth year was often listed as 1934; as Rex Ryan said in his memoir, his father had subtracted a few years from his true age to come off as more youthful when first looking for an NFL job." Ryan played college football for Oklahoma A&M University (now Oklahoma State) where he earned four letters as a guard between 1952 and 1955. He served as a sergeant in the United States Army during the Korean War.

== Coaching ==
=== High school ===
Ryan began his coaching career at Gainesville High School in Gainesville, Texas, in 1957 as an assistant coach under Dub Wooten. When Wooten became head coach at Marshall High School in 1959, Ryan was promoted to head coach at Gainesville where he was also the athletic director. After one season at Gainesville, he spent one year as an assistant coach in Marshall, Texas.

=== College ===
In 1961, after completing service in the military, (which included playing on the Fourth Army championship football team in Japan) Ryan was determined to continue coaching football when he returned, and not at the high school ranks. However, with so many great coaches already in Texas, college jobs were hard to find. Carl Speegle, a former coach of Ryan's, contacted Dick Offenhamer, the head coach of the Buffalo Bulls of the University at Buffalo (UB), who needed a defensive line coach and was also preparing for the program's first season at the NCAA Division I level. From 1962 through 1965, the Bulls defense ranked among the national leaders, posting 12 shutouts in that span as well as producing Gerry Philbin. In 1964, Lou Saban, the head coach of the Buffalo Bills of the American Football League (AFL), reportedly offered Ryan a similar job with the Bills, but he received a $2,000 raise from UB to stay. In 1965, Ryan took a job at Pacific, before finishing his college coaching career the following season with Vanderbilt.

=== New York Jets ===
Ryan joined the New York Jets of the AFL in 1968. He and Walt Michaels' defensive game plan was instrumental in holding the NFL's Baltimore Colts to seven points in Super Bowl III and earning Ryan his first Super Bowl ring. Seeing the emphasis that Weeb Ewbank placed on protecting Joe Namath and his fragile knees, Ryan created multiple blitz packages (i.e. the "59 blitz", the "Taco Bell blitz", and the "Cheeseburger blitz") reasoning that the quarterback is the focal point of any offense, and that a defense must attack the offense's strength and centerpiece.

=== Minnesota Vikings ===
In 1976 and 1977, Ryan served as defensive line coach for the Minnesota Vikings. The Vikings' defensive line, known as the "Purple People Eaters", was heralded for its ability to punish rivals. The 1976 Vikings won the NFC Championship and appeared in Super Bowl XI. In 1977, the Vikings won the NFC Central and reached the NFC Championship game. During his time with the Vikings, he started working on a defensive nickel scheme designed to disrupt the passing game. That formed the early basis of the 46 defense. While Buddy had the title of DL coach, at the insistence of head coach Bud Grant he was actually running the defense.

=== Chicago Bears ===
In 1978, owner George Halas brought in Ryan as defensive coordinator. With the Bears, Ryan created the 46 defense, named after then Bears safety Doug Plank, but it wasn't until 1981 that the scheme was perfected. This was due in large part to Mike Singletary's ability to single-handedly dominate the middle of the field. The defensive players were so loyal to Ryan that when Bears head coach Neill Armstrong was fired in 1982, they urged Halas to name Ryan head coach or at least have the new coach keep Ryan as defensive coordinator.

Ultimately, Mike Ditka was hired as the head coach. Ryan and Ditka "feuded openly", though Ditka mostly left the defense in Ryan's hands. "Ditka challenged Ryan to a fight during halftime" of the Bears' 1985 matchup versus the Miami Dolphins, with the team at 12–0 and trailing 31–10 in a nationally televised Monday Night Football broadcast. "The guys on the team had to separate them—the offense getting Ditka away from Ryan and defensive guys holding Buddy." The Bears went on to lose the game 38–24, which was their only loss of the season. However, the team would go on to Super Bowl XX where they would dominate the New England Patriots 46–10. The Bears defense carried Ryan off the field on their shoulders "...right behind Mike Ditka", who was also being carried off the field. This was the first time two coaches were ever carried off the field at the Super Bowl.

The Bears defense set several NFL records in 1985, and led the league in turnovers forced and surrendered the fewest yards, points, and first downs.

=== Philadelphia Eagles ===
That offseason, Ryan was hired by the Philadelphia Eagles as their head coach. Ryan released running back Earnest Jackson, who had rushed for more than 1,000 yards in both of the previous two seasons, and limited the playing time of veteran quarterback Ron Jaworski. Ryan coached players such as Randall Cunningham, Reggie White, and Andre Waters and drafted Pro Bowlers Seth Joyner, Clyde Simmons, Jerome Brown, Eric Allen, Cris Carter, Fred Barnett, and Keith Jackson. The Eagles made the playoffs in 1988, 1989, and 1990.

On October 25, 1987, he came under fire after a game against the Dallas Cowboys by scoring a touchdown in the final seconds, when the outcome was no longer in doubt. This was apparently Ryan's revenge against Dallas head coach Tom Landry, who Ryan felt had run up the score against the Eagles' replacement players during the 1987 players' strike, using many of the Cowboys players that had crossed the picket line. The controversy marred a season in which the Eagles improved to 7–8, which included a 31–27 win over the eventual Super Bowl champion Redskins at Veterans Stadium.

On November 22, 1989, Ryan found himself at the center of another scandal, when Cowboys head coach Jimmy Johnson alleged Ryan had taken out a "bounty" on two Cowboys players—then-current Dallas (and former Philadelphia) placekicker Luis Zendejas and quarterback Troy Aikman in a game dubbed "Bounty Bowl" played on Thanksgiving Day at Texas Stadium. Ryan's Eagles compiled an 8–2 record against the Cowboys.

On January 8, 1991, Ryan was fired by the Eagles after going 43–35–1 in five seasons, a total that included an 0–3 record in playoff games. As quoted by Eagles owner Norman Braman, "It is time to stop being a bridesmaid and become a bride." Ryan was replaced by his offensive coordinator in Rich Kotite, whom he had hired from the Jets the previous year. Ryan subsequently became an NFL commentator for CNN.

=== Houston Oilers ===
Ryan became the defensive coordinator for the Houston Oilers in 1993, and his unit helped propel the Oilers to an 11-game winning streak at the end of the 1993 NFL season.

On January 2, 1994, in the Oilers' final regular season game against the New York Jets, Ryan was involved in a sideline altercation with the offensive coordinator Kevin Gilbride during the nationally telecast game. Ryan had been criticizing the Oilers' "run and shoot", referring to it as the "chuck and duck." Ryan thought that two defensive players were injured on last-minute defensive stands when the offense could have simply run the clock out. At the end of the first half in the game against the Jets, Gilbride called a pass play, and when Cody Carlson fumbled the snap, Ryan started yelling at Gilbride, who then started walking towards Ryan, yelling back. When they were at arm's length, "Ryan ... attempted to punch Gilbride in the jaw" before linebacker Keith McCants and several other Oilers players separated them. "Kevin Gilbride will be selling insurance in two years," Ryan said a few days after the incident.

The Oilers lost to the Kansas City Chiefs 28–20 in a divisional round match at the Astrodome two weeks later on January 16. After scoring the Chiefs' first touchdown on a 7-yard pass from Joe Montana, Keith Cash fired the football at an image of Ryan's face on a banner hanging beyond the end zone. Holding no grudge against Ryan, Cash explained, "I saw it as I was crossing the goal line, and it was just impulse. I just let it fly."

=== Arizona Cardinals ===
After being given a large share of the credit for the success in Houston in 1993, Ryan was named head coach and general manager of the Arizona Cardinals in 1994. On arriving in Phoenix, Ryan announced, "You've got a winner in town." Ryan was cited as providing a spark of interest in the team with his outspoken nature; he also named his two sons in Rob and Rex to be assistant coaches. Ryan went 8–8 his first year, which came with an offense that was in the bottom five of both total offense and scoring offense; the eight wins were the most for the franchise since the move to Arizona along with their first non-losing season since 1984. The following year did not go as well. He was fired after the Cardinals crumbled to 4–12 the following season, which saw them lose seven of their final eight games. After a miserable 37–13 loss on Monday Night Football to the Dallas Cowboys to close the year out, Ryan (who mistakenly left the field before the final seconds) was fired by owner Bill Bidwill on December 26. Bidwill cited the lackluster effort by the team as the pushing factor in his decision. He spent two seasons in Arizona and compiled a record of 12–20.

== Legacy ==
Ryan was an assistant on three different teams to make the Super Bowl (New York Jets, Chicago Bears, and Minnesota Vikings). He built his reputation as a defensive specialist and was largely credited with implementing and perfecting the 46 defense.

Ryan's twin sons have been coaches in the NFL. Rex Ryan was head coach of the Buffalo Bills and New York Jets, and Rob Ryan was an assistant head coach and defensive coordinator for a number of teams.

== Personal life ==
Ryan was previously married to Doris Ryan, and had three sons: James David Jr., and fraternal twins Rex and Rob. They divorced after 11 years of marriage, eight months after Rex and Rob were born.

Ryan met his second wife, Joanie Ryan, in 1968 when the two lived in the same apartment building in the Bayside neighborhood of Queens, while he was an assistant coach with the New York Jets. The two married in 1970. She died in September 2013 after a long battle with Alzheimer's disease.

Ryan died on June 28, 2016, on his ranch in Shelbyville, Kentucky, at the age of 85, after a lengthy illness. He was buried at Lawrenceburg Cemetery in Lawrenceburg, Kentucky, where he also had a farm. Ryan had battled cancer and suffered a major stroke in recent years.

== Head coaching record ==
Team	Year	Regular season					Postseason			
Team	Year	Won	Lost	Ties	Win %	Finish	Won	Lost	Win %	Result
PHI	1986	5	10	1	.344	4th in NFC East	–	–	–	–
PHI	1987	7	8	0	.467	2nd in NFC East	–	–	–	–
PHI	1988	10	6	0	.625	1st in NFC East	0	1	.000	Lost to Chicago Bears in NFC Divisional Game.
PHI	1989	11	5	0	.688	2nd in NFC East	0	1	.000	Lost to Los Angeles Rams in NFC Wild Card Game.
PHI	1990	10	6	0	.625	2nd in NFC East	0	1	.000	Lost to Washington Redskins in NFC Wild Card Game.
PHI Total		43	35	1	.551		0	3	.000	
ARI	1994	8	8	0	.500	3rd in NFC East	–	–	–	–
ARI	1995	4	12	0	.250	5th in NFC East	–	–	–	–
ARI Total		12	20	0	.375		0	0	.000	
Total		55	55	1	.500		0	3	.000	
