= Lybrant Robinson =

American football player (born 1964)

No. 78
- Position: Defensive end

Personal information
- Born: August 31, 1964 (age 62); Salisbury, Maryland, U.S.

Career information
- High school: Salisbury (MD) Bennett
- College: Delaware State
- NFL draft: 1989: 5th round, 139th overall pick

Career history
- 1989: Washington Redskins
- 1990: Dallas Cowboys*
- 1991–1994: Ottawa Rough Riders
- 1994–1997: Saskatchewan Roughriders
- * Offseason or practice squad member only
- Stats at Pro Football Reference

Lybrant G. Robinson (born August 31, 1964) is an American former professional football defensive end in the National Football League (NFL) for the Washington Redskins. He played college football at Delaware State University and was selected in the fifth round of the 1989 NFL draft. Robinson later became a starter in the Canadian Football League (CFL) with the Ottawa Rough Riders from 1991 to 1994 and the Saskatchewan Roughriders from 1994 to 1997.
