= Jessie Small =

American football player (born 1966)

No. 52, 50, 97
- Position: Linebacker

Personal information
- Born: November 30, 1966 (age 59); Boston, Georgia, U.S.
- Listed height: 6 ft 3 in (1.91 m)
- Listed weight: 239 lb (108 kg)

Career information
- High school: Thomas County Central (GA)
- College: Eastern Kentucky
- NFL draft: 1989: 2nd round, 49th overall pick

Career history
- Philadelphia Eagles (1989–1991); Phoenix Cardinals (1992); Houston Oilers (1993)*; Ottawa Rough Riders (1994); Hamilton Tiger-Cats (1995–1996)
- * Offseason or practice squad member only

Career NFL statistics
- Sacks: 3.5
- Fumble recoveries: 1
- Stats at Pro Football Reference

Jessie Lee Small (born November 30, 1966) is an American former professional football player who was a linebacker for four seasons with the Philadelphia Eagles and the Phoenix Cardinals. He played college football for the Eastern Kentucky Colonels and was selected 49th overall by the Eagles in the second round of the 1989 NFL draft.
