= Mike Reichenbach (American football) =

American football player (born 1961)

No. 55, 52
- Position: Linebacker

Personal information
- Born: September 14, 1961 (age 65); Fort Meade, Maryland, U.S.
- Listed height: 6 ft 2 in (1.88 m)
- Listed weight: 236 lb (107 kg)

Career information
- High school: Liberty
- College: East Stroudsburg
- NFL draft: 1984: undrafted

Career history
- Philadelphia Eagles (1984–1989); Miami Dolphins (1990–1991); San Francisco 49ers (1992)*
- * Offseason or practice squad member only

Career NFL statistics
- Sacks: 2
- Fumble recoveries: 3
- Interceptions: 2
- Stats at Pro Football Reference

Jon Michael Reichenbach (born September 14, 1961) is an American former professional football player who was a linebacker for eight seasons in the National Football League (NFL), primarily with the Philadelphia Eagles. He played college football for the East Stroudsburg Warriors.
