= The Patron Saint of Liars =

The Patron Saint of Liars may refer to:

- The Patron Saint of Liars (novel), a 1992 novel by Ann Patchett
- The Patron Saint of Liars (film), its 1998 television film adaptation
