= Phil Bogle =

American football player (born 1979)

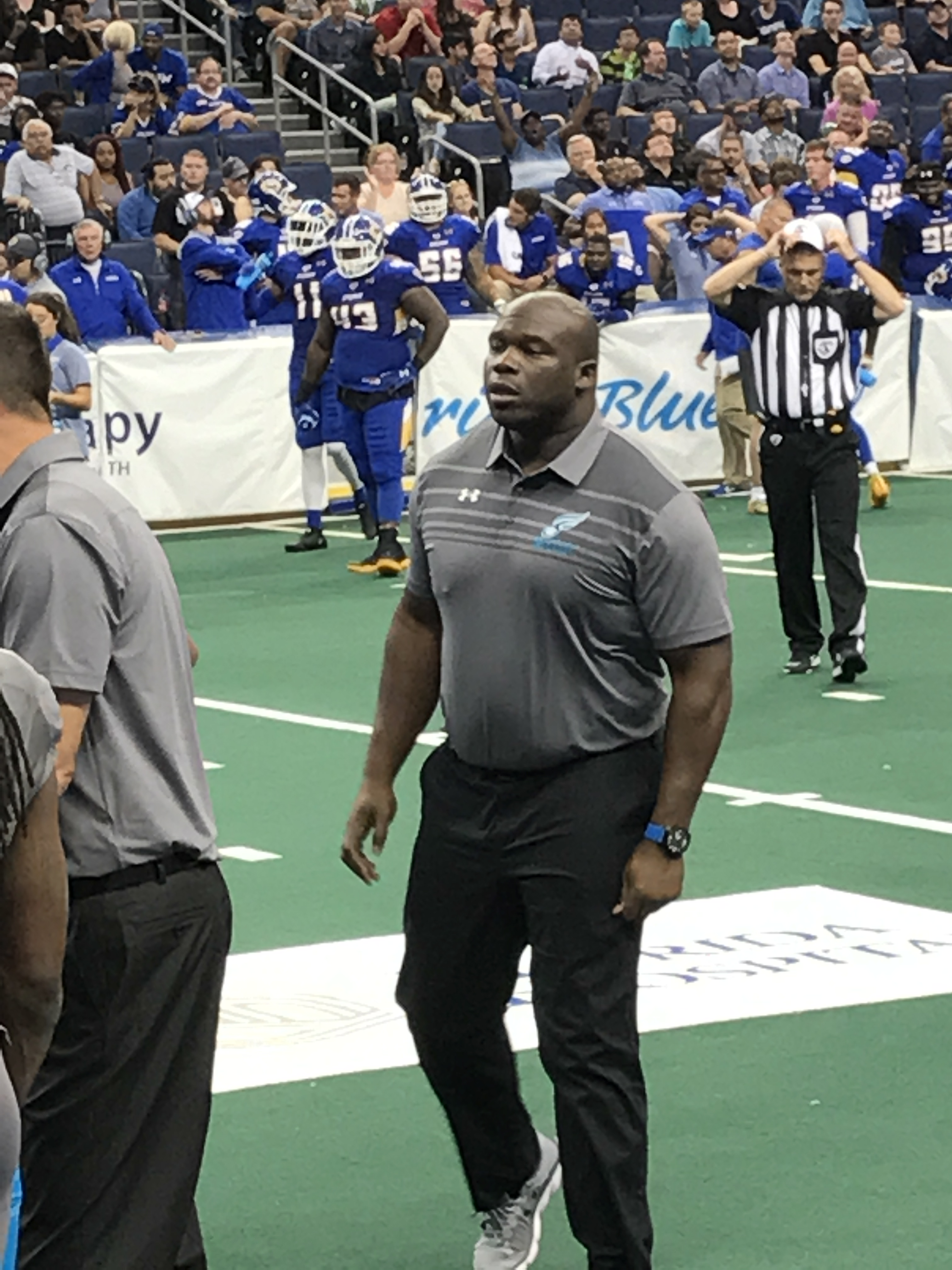
- Bogle with the Philadelphia Soul in 2017

No. 64, 77
- Position: Offensive guard

Personal information
- Born: September 27, 1979 (age 47); Spring Valley, New York, U.S.
- Listed height: 6 ft 3 in (1.91 m)
- Listed weight: 310 lb (141 kg)

Career information
- High school: Spring Valley
- College: New Haven
- NFL draft: 2003: undrafted

Career history

Playing
- San Diego Chargers (2003–2004); Cleveland Browns (2005)*; Tampa Bay Buccaneers (2005–2006)*; → Hamburg Sea Devils (2006); Philadelphia Soul (2007–2008); Tampa Bay Buccaneers (2008)*; Philadelphia Soul (2009)*; Montreal Alouettes (2009)*; Dallas Vigilantes (2010); Florida Tuskers (2010)
- * Offseason or practice squad member only

Coaching
- Philadelphia Soul (2013–2019) (assistant)

Awards and highlights
- 3× ArenaBowl champion (2008, 2016, 2017); 2× First-team All-Arena (2007, 2008); Second-team All-Arena (2010); AFL All-Rookie Team (2007); 2× AFL Assistant Coach of the Year (2017, 2018); First-team Division II All-Independent (2002); Jim Langer Award (2002)
- Stats at Pro Football Reference
- Stats at CFL.ca (archive)
- Stats at ArenaFan.com

Phillip R. Bogle (born September 27, 1979) is an American former professional football player who was a guard with the San Diego Chargers of the National Football League (NFL). He was signed by the Chargers as an undrafted free agent in 2003. He played college football for the New Haven Chargers.

Bogle was also a member of the Cleveland Browns and Tampa Bay Buccaneers of the NFL, the Hamburg Sea Devils of NFL Europe, the Philadelphia Soul and Dallas Vigilantes of the Arena Football League (AFL), the Montreal Alouettes of the Canadian Football League (CFL), and the Florida Tuskers of the United Football League (UFL). He was later an assistant head coach and general manager for the Soul.

== Early life ==
Bogle attended Spring Valley High School in Spring Valley, New York, where he was an All-State, All-Section and All-League selection in football. Bogle also became the fourth person from Spring Valley High School to make it to the NFL after Seth Joyner, John Harvey and R-Kal Truluck.

== College career ==
Bogle attended the University of New Haven from 1999 to 2002, starting every game for the team at offensive tackle during his career. A team captain during his final two seasons, he was a First-team Division II All-Independent selection as a senior in 2002 and winner the Jim Langer Award. He was also the 2002 Cactus Bowl MVP and 2003 New Haven Male Athlete of the Year.

== Professional career ==
=== San Diego Chargers ===
After going undrafted in the 2003 NFL draft, Bogle was signed by the San Diego Chargers as an undrafted free agent on April 23. During his rookie season, Bogle worked at both guard and tackle and started 13 of the 16 games in which he appeared. Bogle also recorded three tackles on the year. That season, Chargers running back LaDainian Tomlinson rushed for more than 1,600 yards.

During the 2004 offseason, Bogle received an extra $74,754 from the league's performance-based pay program. After dealing with a knee injury in the spring, Bogle failed to make the Chargers' roster in September and was released. He was re-signed to the active roster from the practice squad after offensive tackle Courtney Van Buren was placed on injured reserve with a knee injury. Bogle was released by the team again on October 4.

=== Cleveland Browns ===
After spending the remainder of the 2004 season out of football, Bogle signed with the Cleveland Browns on February 15, 2005. However, he was waived by the team on July 29.

=== Tampa Bay Buccaneers (first stint) ===
Following his release from the Browns, Bogle was signed by the Tampa Bay Buccaneers on August 16, 2005. He was released by the team on August 30 and was out of football until being re-signed by the Buccaneers on January 11, 2006. Bogle's two-year contract contained base salaries of $310,000 in 2006 and $385,000 in 2007. That same month, Bogle was drafted by the Hamburg Sea Devils of NFL Europe. He started all 10 games for the Sea Devils in 2006. The Buccaneers waived Bogle again on July 28, 2006.

=== Philadelphia Soul (first stint) ===
On October 27, 2006, Bogle was signed by the Philadelphia Soul of the Arena Football League.

During his rookie season in 2007, Bogle started all 16 regular season games and two postseason games for the Soul on his way to becoming the franchise's first player to be named to the All-Rookie Team and First-team All-Arena in the same season.

In 2008, Bogle earned his second consecutive First-team All-Arena selection and was a finalist for the league's Lineman of the Year award. He appeared in 16 regular season games and three postseason games as the team won ArenaBowl XXII. He caught seven passes for 60 yards and six touchdowns on the season as an eligible-receiver lineman.

=== Tampa Bay Buccaneers (second stint) ===
Following the 2008 AFL season, Bogle was placed on the Other league exempt list after being re-signed by the Tampa Bay Buccaneers on August 20, 2008. He was re-signed by the Buccaneers to improve the team's offensive line depth. Fullback J. D. Runnels was waived to make room for Bogle on the 80-man roster. However, Bogle was waived by the Buccaneers on August 30.

=== Philadelphia Soul (second stint) ===
On September 22, the Soul activated Bogle off the Exempt: Other league list, after he was waived by the Buccaneers.

=== Montreal Alouettes ===
On February 18, 2009, the Montreal Alouettes signed Bogle to a one-year deal with an option for a second year. He was released on June 16, 2009.

=== Dallas Vigilantes ===
Bogle signed with the Dallas Vigilantes on January 8, 2010.

== Post-playing career ==
Bogle later served as an assistant head coach and general manager for the Soul.

== Personal ==
Bogle is the son of Glen Bogle. He has one brother named Conroy and four sisters named Keesha, Shannon, Yolanda and Julisha. During the offseason, he resides in Port St. Lucie, Florida.

== See also ==
- List of Arena Football League and National Football League players
