= Spring Valley High School (New York) =

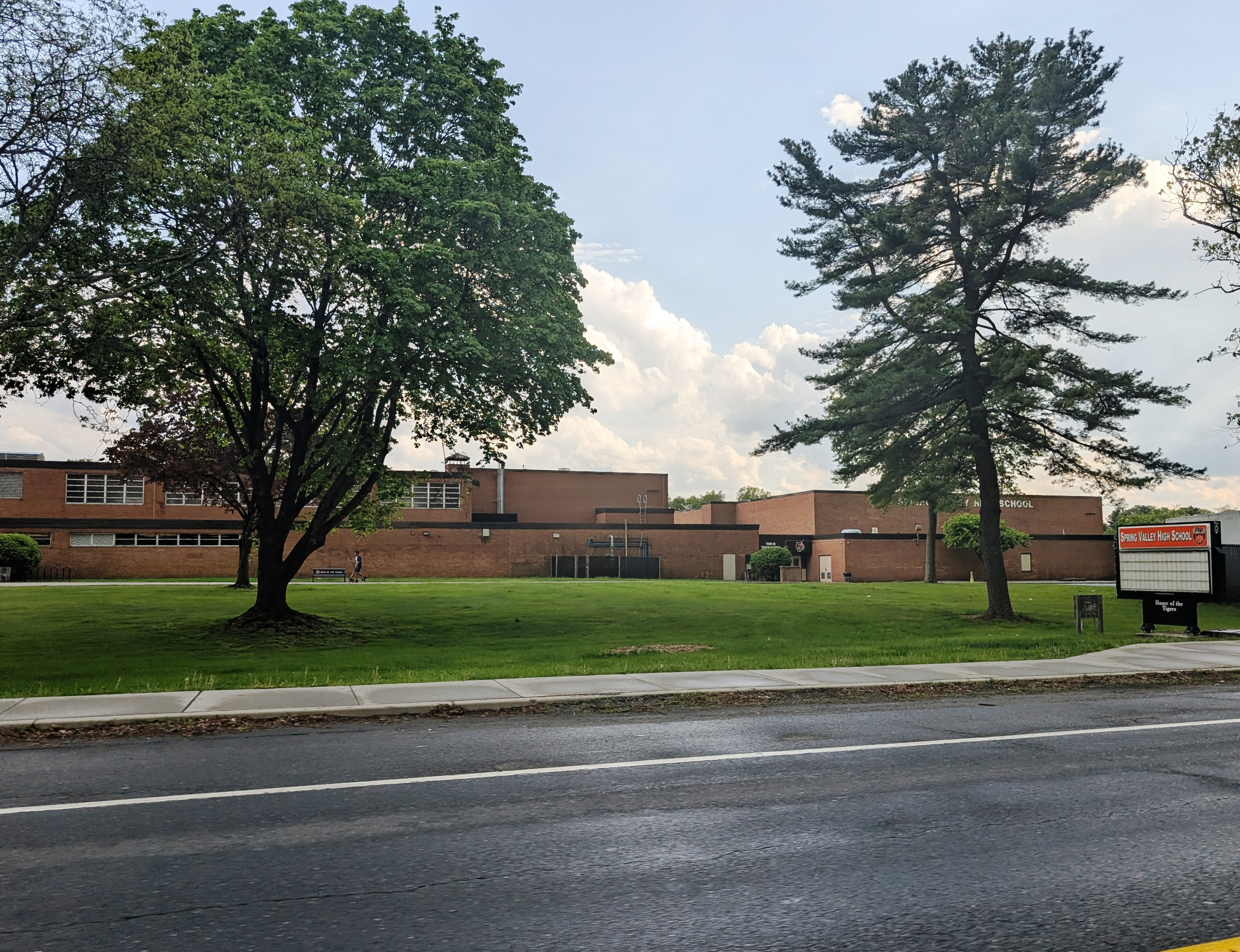

Location
- 361 Route 59; Spring Valley, New York 10977; United States; 41.10744°N 74.05591°W

Information
- School type: Public high school
- School district: East Ramapo Central School District
- Principal: Frank Carlson
- Staff: 114.17 (FTE)
- Grades: 9 - 12
- Enrollment: 1,562 (2023-24)
- Student to teacher ratio: 11.79
- Language: English
- Campus type: Suburban
- Colors: Red-Orange; Black
- Athletics: American football, Association football (soccer), Baseball, Basketball, Cheerleading, Cross country, Dance, Softball, Tennis, Track and field, Volleyball, Wrestling, Section 1 (NYSPHSAA)
- Team name: Tigers
- Website: Spring Valley High School

Spring Valley High School is a high school located in Spring Valley, New York, educating students in grades 9 through 12.

Spring Valley is one of two high schools in the East Ramapo Central School District (ERCSD). The school is accredited by the New York State Board of Regents.

== The school district ==
The East Ramapo Central School District is the largest school district in Rockland County, New York. Spring Valley High School and Ramapo High School are the two high schools within East Ramapo. Located 30 miles (48 km) northwest of New York, in the center of Rockland County, East Ramapo is a middle-class suburban, predominantly residential community within commuting distance of New York City, Westchester County, and northern New Jersey. The district's total area is 33 square miles (85 km^{2}), with an estimated 80,000 residents within its borders.

== East Ramapo Marching Band ==
Spring Valley High School and Ramapo High School form the East Ramapo Marching Band. The band was featured in the 2004 film The Manchurian Candidate.

== The school ==
=== History ===
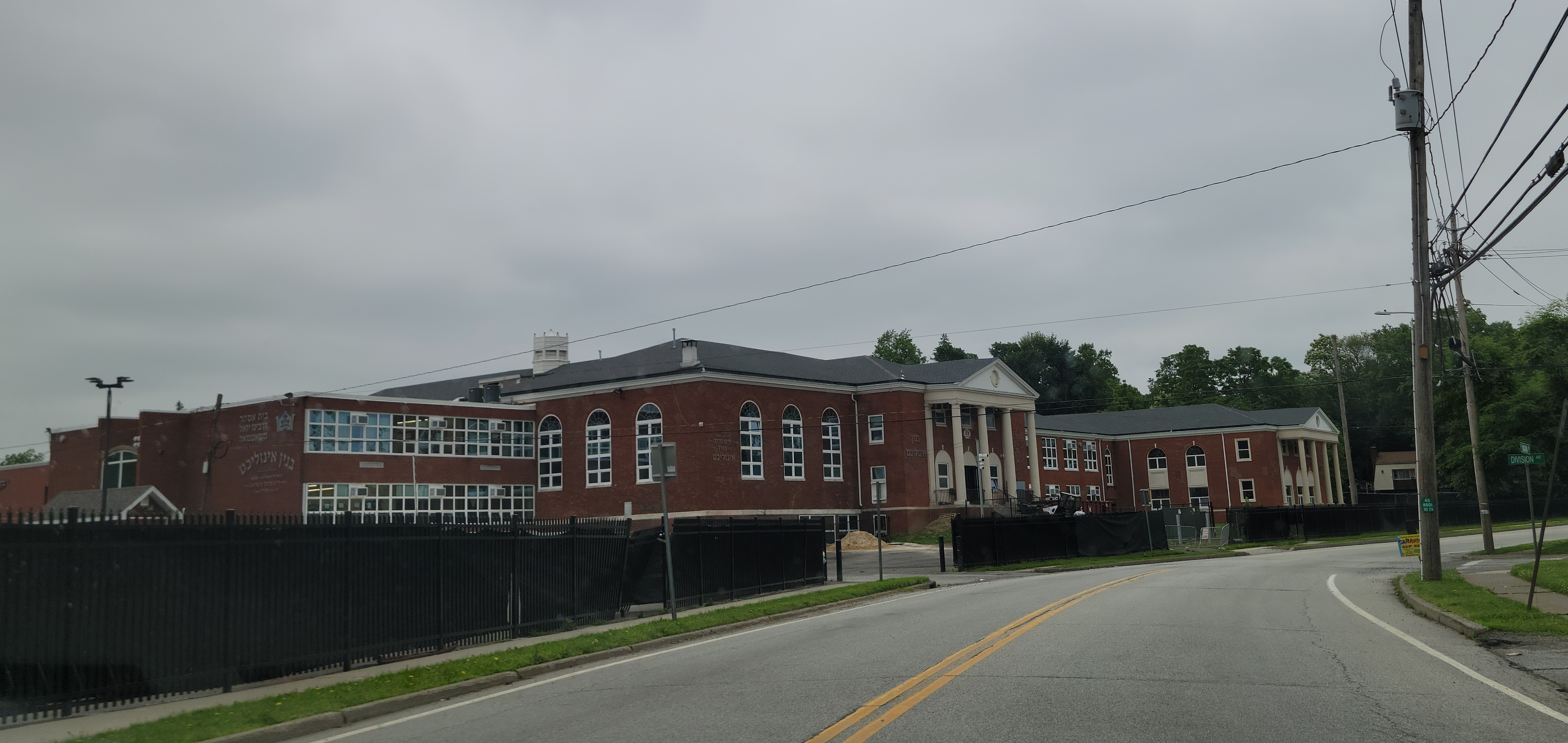
The original Spring Valley High School on South Main Street, later used as Spring Valley Junior High School until 1972.

Prior to the creation of Spring Valley High School, a Union Free School was established in 1871, located at the intersection of Route 59 (East Central Avenue) and Route 45 (South Main Street) which was later the site of the Shoppers Paradise department store. A high school program was started in the Union Free School circa 1888. In 1896, a new K–12 school was constructed at 50 South Main Street. Records indicate that Albert Henry Goodhardt was the first clerk of the Spring Valley Board of Education after its incorporation in 1902. Following that, he was trustee of the Spring Valley High School for six years, and president of the Board of Education for the Village of Spring Valley for five years.

Spring Valley High School was first located at 89 South Main Street (Route 45) in Spring Valley, opened in 1924. In 1950 as part of the centralization of multiple school districts in East Ramapo, a new senior high school was proposed to replace the South Main Street School. Offices for the Ramapo Central School District No. 2 (now East Ramapo Central School District) were relocated into the new Spring Valley Senior High School on Route 59 in March 1957 following a fire in their main offices. Students moved into the new building in late April 1957. The new building was dedicated on November 10, 1957, with the school costing $2 million to construct.

The old South Main Street building would become Spring Valley Junior High School in January 1958. The Main Street building was closed in 1972, replaced by a new South Spring Valley Junior High School (now Chestnut Ridge Middle School) in what is now Chestnut Ridge, New York.

=== Curriculum ===
Spring Valley High School offers a 200 course curriculum. Presently, this includes 16 Advanced Placement courses in the five major departments, as well as college credit courses offered through two universities. 45% or more of students taking AP exams score a "3" or better on average at SVHS. In the 1950s and 1960s, the curriculum was one to two years behind that of New York City schools. For example, the mathematics department did not offer calculus.

=== Educational tools ===
- A library media center with more than 20,000 volumes.

=== Student placement ===
Grouping in Spring Valley is by ability, achievement, and teacher evaluation. Those in advanced placement courses constitute the upper 10% of the student body. Those in honors courses comprise the upper 20% of the student body. Regents courses contain students in the average academic group.

==== Graduation requirements ====
GRADUATION REQUIREMENTS
English	4
Social studies	4
Science	3
Mathematics	3
LOTE	1
Physical Education	2
Art and / or Music	1
Health education	.5
Electives	3.5
Total Credits	22

=== Recognition/achievements ===
- Spring Valley High School has been cited by The College Board for the excellence of its Advanced Placement program.
- In the last five years an average of 93% of students continue of to post-secondary education, with an average of 52% going to four-year institutions. The five-year average for scholarship monies received is $2.75 million.
- Spring Valley High School was ranked by Newsweek among the top 500 high schools in the nation for four consecutive years.
- Spring Valley High School was ranked one of America's best high schools in 2010 by Newsweek.
- Intel Science Talent Research Semi-Finalist and Ron Brown Finalist.

== Notable alumni ==
- Marty Appel: Class of 1966; public relations and sports management executive, television executive producer, and author of 20 books.
- Phil Bogle: former American football guard in the National Football League for the San Diego Chargers.
- Jonathan Eig: Class of 1982, writer of five non-fiction books, as well articles for The Wall Street Journal, The New York Times, Esquire, and Chicago Magazine.
- Roger Graham: former American football running back. Winner of the 1993 Harlon Hill Trophy.
- Lucy Grealy: (1963–2002, Dublin, Ireland), poet and memoirist. Author of Autobiography of a Face, first published in 1994 and released again in 2003.
- John Harvey: former American football running back in the National Football League for the Tampa Bay Buccaneers.
- Mondaire Jones: Class of 2005, Member of the United States House of Representatives from New York's 17th district.
- Seth Joyner: former American football linebacker in the National Football League for the Philadelphia Eagles, Arizona Cardinals, Green Bay Packers and Denver Broncos.
- Clayton Landey: Class of 1968 is an actor, director, producer, writer and teacher. Best known for his role in Knots Landing.
- Eugene Levy (politician)
- Bishop Nehru: American rapper signed to Mass Appeal
- Gerald S. O'Loughlin: Gerald Stuart O'Loughlin Jr. (b. 1921), television, stage, and film actor and director who was primarily known for playing tough-talking and rough-looking characters.
- R-Kal Truluck: former American football defensive end in the National Football League for the Kansas City Chiefs, Green Bay Packers and Arizona Cardinals.
- Nana Kwame Adjei-Brenyah: Speculative dystopian fiction writer and NY Times bestselling author of Friday Black and Chain-Gang All-Stars
