= Truth & Beauty: A Friendship =

Memoir by Ann Patchett

- First edition cover
- Author: Ann Patchett
- Audio read by: Ann Patchett
- Language: English
- Genre: Memoir
- Publisher: HarperCollins
- Publication date: May 2004
- Media type: Print
- Pages: 272 pp.
- ISBN: 978-0-06-057214-3 (First edition hardcover)
- OCLC: 53932670

Truth & Beauty: A Friendship is a memoir by Ann Patchett. First published in 2004 by Harper Perennial the memoir focuses on Patchett's 18 year friendship with memoirist Lucy Grealy which began when they were 21.

The book was published just 18 months after Grealy's death. Her family was publicly opposed to Patchett's memoir, which included excerpts from private letters Grealy wrote to Patchett, as well as depicting Grealy's attitude towards sex, an abortion, and her heroin use.

The memoir has been suggested as a companion work to Grealy's own memoir Autobiography of a Face, as much of it covers the years directly after the latter book was published, including Grealy's abrupt rise to fame and her descent into addiction. Patchett herself stated that one of her intentions in writing the work was to continue to draw attention and interest to Autobiography of a Face.

== Summary ==
In 1985 Patchett is accepted into the Iowa Writers' Workshop. The only other person she knows from college who is also attending is Lucy Grealy who seems angry that Patchett is also a writer. Because both women have little money, Patchett rents a small house for them to both live in. The two quickly become friends and Patchett, who thinks of herself as naive and boring, is in awe of the flighty, warm and talented Grealy. Lucy was disfigured by surgeries to her jaw to save her from Ewing's sarcoma and attracts much attention. Patchett, who has her own minor facial disfigurations due to a car accident, is not preoccupied with her friend's face and continues to enjoy her friendship with the vivacious Lucy.

The two graduate from Iowa and go their separate ways but still maintain a deep friendship. In their late twenties, despite some success, they both feel adrift. After a quick marriage and divorce Patchett works as a waitress while Lucy is stuck in Aberdeen awaiting a promising jaw surgery that will reconstruct her face. Patchett obtains a fellowship to the Fine Arts Work Center and while there completes her debut novel The Patron Saint of Liars. It sells immediately. Meanwhile, Lucy is invited to contribute an essay to an anthology. She writes about being made fun of by childhood bullies. The essay is successful and leads to Lucy finding an agent and receiving a sizeable book advance to turn her essay into a memoir. Patchett's second novel, Taft, comes out at the same time as Lucy's memoir Autobiography of a Face. Patchett's novel is a failure whereas Lucy's memoir is a huge success. Patchett however is delighted for her friend and feels that her years spent being stared at by cruel strangers has prepared her for a life of fame.

Despite her fame and success Lucy continues to struggle in life as she is financially irresponsible, struggles to meet writing deadlines, and worries that she is unloveable. Patchett also finds her to be demanding and controlling, often growing jealous of Patchett's boyfriends and friends. Nevertheless, Patchett continues to love her friend.

Lucy continues to struggle with the quality of her life as a lack of teeth means that she has difficulty chewing and eating. Despite being told it is nearly impossible to obtain either implants or dentures Lucy decides to undergo an experimental surgery that will graft bone from her leg onto her jaw. The first step of the surgery is successful but leaves Lucy in extreme physical pain and unable to walk. Struggling with the pain and with the failure of her essay collection Lucy begins to dabble with heroin. When it is time to undergo a second surgery on her jaw the doctors discover that the grafted bone is too feeble to hold implants. Lucy descends into depression and indulges in self-harm and heroin. She temporarily moves to Nashville to stay with Patchett but is drawn back to her life in New York.

Lucy undergoes a second jaw surgery which is successful but results in her developing an addiction to Oxycontin and later heroin. During this time Patchett's book Bel Canto becomes a surprise runaway success. Patchett has difficulty balancing Lucy's increasing neediness with her work commitments. In 2002 for the first time in her life she goes to New York City for work and does not inform Lucy. Upon returning home she learns that Lucy has died from an accidental overdose.

== Reception ==
In 2007 Patchett wrote about the negative reaction to her book comparing it to pornography in Clemson, South Carolina. The book was also reviewed in the New York Times and the New Yorker.
