= Run (novel) =

2007 novel by Ann Patchett

- First edition (publ. HarperCollins)
- Author: Ann Patchett
- Language: English
- Set in: Boston
- Publisher: HarperCollins
- Publication date: September 25, 2007
- ISBN: 9780061340635

Run is a 2007 novel by American author Ann Patchett. It was her first novel after the widely successful Bel Canto (2001).

== Plot summary ==
This novel tells the story of Bernard Doyle, an Irish Catholic Boston politician. He and wife Bernadette have one biological son and later adopt African-American brothers Tip and Teddy. (The adoptees' names were given to them by the Doyles as a tribute to the Massachusetts politicians Thomas "Tip" O'Neill and Edward "Teddy" Kennedy.) Four years later, Doyle loses Bernadette to cancer. Sixteen years after his wife's death, Tip and Teddy are university students. Bernard, the former mayor of Boston, has invited them to a Jesse Jackson lecture and a reception afterward. Tip is pushed out of the path of an oncoming vehicle by a woman the family believes is a stranger. The novel's plot centers around that woman's identity and that of her 11-year-old daughter Kenya, who comes to stay with the Doyles. Interracial adoption, family allegiances and rivalries, and Boston’s notoriously complex political and racial history come into play, as does the role of religious faith in each family member's life.

== Reception ==
Run received mixed reviews but was a New York Times bestseller.

Leah Hager Cohen of The New York Times said in her review:

"If Patchett had exhumed her characters’ motivations more thoroughly, she might have persuaded readers of the circumstances that led to such a choice. And in so doing she might have elicited deeper sympathy and interest. The Jesse Jackson lecture turns out to be little more than a set piece, and the characters’ racial identities are either ignored or too broadly indicated. (Kenya and her mother live in a housing project; Kenya, Tip and Teddy are all endowed with a stereotypical black athletic gift, a talent for running.) It’s difficult to understand why an author would seed her story with potentially rich material only to refrain from exploring it. But this might explain why Patchett’s characters ultimately feel less real than symbolic, as wooden as the Virgin’s statue."

Nora Seton of the Houston Chronicle said: "This is a novel staffed exclusively by protagonists, and Patchett's often dazzling insights cannot lift it into second gear. Run would have profited from a brutish and anguished soul."

Writing for The New Yorker, John Updike said: "As realism, her novel is pale; but as a metaphoric representation of growth it transcends its sentimentality."

Writing for Publishers Weekly, Andrew O'Hagan said, "The book is lovely to read and is satisfyingly bold in its attempt to say something patient and true about family."

In a mixed review, Kirkus Reviews described the story as "Compelling...but thematically heavy-handed."
