= Roger Graham (American football) =

American football player (born 1972)

No. 34
- Position: Running back

Personal information
- Born: November 8, 1972 (age 53); Bronx, New York, U.S.
- Listed height: 6 ft 2 in (1.88 m)
- Listed weight: 187 lb (85 kg)

Career information
- High school: Spring Valley (Spring Valley, New York)
- College: New Haven
- NFL draft: 1995: undrafted

Career history
- Dallas Cowboys (1995)*; Jacksonville Jaguars (1996)
- * Offseason or practice squad member only

Awards and highlights
- Harlon Hill Trophy (1993)

Career NFL statistics
- Games played: 1
- Stats at Pro Football Reference

Roger Alton Graham (born November 8, 1972) is an American former professional football player who was a running back for one season in the National Football League (NFL) with the Jacksonville Jaguars. He was signed as an undrafted free agent by the Dallas Cowboys in 1995, following a college football career with the New Haven Chargers, during which he won the Harlon Hill Trophy in 1993.

== Early life and college ==
Graham was born on November 8, 1972, in Bronx, New York. He attended Spring Valley High School before playing college football at the University of New Haven. He gained 389 yards his senior season of high school as a fullback, and was recruited to New Haven as a linebacker. He convinced the team to put him at tailback, and made an immediate impact when started, setting the all-time school record for single-game rushing yards, with 262 in a 30–31 loss vs. Shippensburg. A week later, he earned rookie of the week honors after a 251-yard performance against Southern Connecticut in a 60–64 loss. He split time as tailback in his freshman season, but still managed to rack up 942 yards, a school record at the time. He also scored eight touchdowns on 161 rushes, achieving 5.9 yards per carry.

Graham earned an increased role in his sophomore year, and broke the single-season New Haven record for rushing yards. Sports Illustrated named him player of the week after he recorded 298 rushing yards and five touchdowns (90, 61, 46, 46, 4) on 18 carries, with an average of over 16 per carry. By September 12 he averaged over 210 yards rushing per game, leading the NCAA Division II. By just four games played in the 1992 season, Graham had over 725 rushing yards on just 77 carries, averaging 9+ yards per. He had 200 yards and two touchdowns in an 80–26 victory over Virginia Union on September 26. His coach, Mark Whipple, commented, "We want to put the football in Roger's hands 20 times a game. He is a game breaker. People bounce off him and then he has the speed to outrun other players. He's a combination of speed and power." He also called Graham "the most talented back I've ever been around in coaching." An article by The Journal News wrote, "The thought of an improved Graham is scary. He's already New Haven's second-leading career rusher, just four games into his sophomore year."

Graham would become the school's all-time leading rusher in his fifth sophomore appearance, following a 192-yard game against Central Connecticut. By his fifteenth overall appearance, Graham averaged over 120 yards rushing per game. He helped the school achieve its sixth consecutive 1992 win following a performance that included 236 yards rushing, and three touchdowns, against American International. In the game he became the first New Haven player to top 1,000 single-season yards, as well as the 20th New England player to reach 2,000+ total career yards. He was named Division II honor role after carrying 17 times for 140 yards with two touchdowns, helping New Haven win its ninth game of the year. He would finish the season with 1,717 rushing yards, helping New Haven make the playoffs and break the record previously set by him in the last year by 775. The 1,717 yards was enough to lead the entire Division II as well as give him first-team Little All-American honors. He finished third in Division II scoring with 22 touchdowns.

In his junior season, Graham would rack up over 1,600 yards, being rated one of the county's top running backs. In the third game of the season, against Clarion, Graham recorded 223 rushing yards on 21 carries, averaging over 10 yards per and helping New Haven rank 3rd nationally. On each of New Haven's scoring drives in the 35–23 victory, Graham made an important contribution. In the first, he made a 32–yard rush, setting up his one-yard rushing score; in the second, he scored his first career receiving touchdown, from 19 yards out, thrown by Jim Weir; over 60 of the yards gained in their third drive were gained by Graham; he ran for 52 yards in the fourth, later scoring on a one-yard rush; he also scored the touchdown in their fifth and final score, on a 2–yard rush set up by his 14–yard run. Graham finished the year with 21 consecutive 100+ yard games.

On ceremonies held on December 10, 1993, Graham was awarded the Harlon Hill Trophy, given to the best player in Division II, after beating out finalists Tyrone Rush and Jamie Pass. He was given the honor despite not having started a single game all season, as senior back A. J. Livingstone was given the starting role each game. His coach Mark Whipple said, "He's (Graham) better than the other guy. It's just that the other guy is a senior ... Roger will definitely be the man next year." Whipple also said, "Next year, he's going to be the man. He has a chance to break every single record." He became the first and only New Haven winner, following a season that included 1,687 rush yards, an average of 13.6 points scored per game, and an average of 9.2 yards per carry. In the finalist voting, Graham received 35 first-place votes, and 165 total points. At the time, the 165 points were the second-highest total in the history of the award. His school finished the season undefeated, compiling a 10–0 record before being eliminated in the playoff quarterfinals. In addition, Graham was named to the Little All-American team for the second consecutive year.

Following his award-winning junior season, Connecticut governor Lowell Weicker declared February 2, 1994, "Roger Graham Day". His hometown of Spring Valley, New York did the same on June 1. His teammates nicknamed him "Harlon" after his winning of the Harlon Hill Trophy. "The guys have nicknamed me 'Harlon.' It doesn't bother me," said Graham in a 1994 interview.

He went from averaging 15 carries per game in his previous seasons to nearly 28 per game in the 1994 season. In the first game of the season, a 38–6 victory against Bloomsburg, Graham recorded over 200 rushing yards and three scores in the 21st consecutive New Haven regular season victory. An Indiana coach commented on Graham, "There is the run-and-shoot and then there is the run-and-shoot with Roger Graham ... Graham is certainly outstanding." When the New Haven Chargers played Indiana, ranked no. 2 nationally, they won on a late field goal at the end of the fourth quarter. Graham played an important role in the game, which had the biggest attendance in school history. By October 27, Graham trailed only Walter Payton, one of his favorite players, as all-time Division II scorer. "I had a video of Payton that I watched all the time when I came to New Haven," he said. "My style is to make the initial contact, bounce off the tackle and then make something happen." "That's the way Payton ran," coach Tony Sparano said. "Like Payton, Roger has the speed once he gets into the secondary to run away from people."

With three games remaining in the 1994 season, Graham needed 55 points to break the all-time points record in Division II, 65 for all divisions; five touchdowns to set the Division II record, 12 all divisions; 778 yards to break all divisions record for rushing yards; and three 100-yard games to tie the all divisions record. He had rushed for 1,197 yards and 15 touchdowns by that point. Graham finished the season with 1,607 yards on 278 carries, a 5.8 average with 17 scores. He finished no. 1 in the state of Connecticut for rushes, yards, touchdowns and yards per game (160.7). He finished his career with 5,953 yards, fifth all-time in the NCAA. He was a 2000 inductee to the New Haven Chargers Hall of Fame.

== Professional career ==
Graham did not have an injury until his final college game, but "the timing couldn't have been worse", as it affected his combine statistics and made his draft projection go from round 3 to undrafted. "Coming out of a small school, it hurts," he said. "It doesn't look good to be in a small school and be in the predicament I'm in now." He was ranked by Mel Kiper as the 34th rated running back in the draft.

He would end up going unselected, being signed as an undrafted free agent by the Dallas Cowboys. He recorded 15 carries for 66 yards in two preseason games before being released. In February 1996, he was signed by the Jacksonville Jaguars. He appeared in one game with the Jaguars, becoming the fourth New Haven attendee to play professionally. It would be his only career game.
