= Commonwealth (Patchett novel) =

Book by Ann Patchett

- First edition, 2016
- Author: Ann Patchett
- Language: English
- Publisher: Harper
- Publication date: September 13, 2016
- Publication place: United States
- Media type: Print (hardback, paperback) Audiobook (CD)
- Pages: 336 pp. (hardback, first edition)
- ISBN: 9780062491794
- OCLC: 932576291

Commonwealth is the seventh novel by American author Ann Patchett, published in 2016. The novel begins with an illicit kiss that leads to an affair that destroys two marriages and creates a reluctantly blended family. In a series of vignettes spanning fifty years, it tells the story of the six children whose lives were disrupted and how they intertwined.

== Plot ==
In 1960s Southern California, Fix and Beverly Keating have a christening party for their younger daughter, Franny. Albert "Bert" Cousins, a district attorney Fix only crossed paths with once before, a while ago, arrives uninvited. Bert becomes infatuated with Beverly, and kisses her at the party. Bert and Beverly have an affair, marry, and move to Virginia.

The two Keating children and four Cousins children come together every summer in Virginia. The youngest child, Albie, annoys the other five; the children often give him Benadryl to put him to sleep. On one such occasion, Cal, the oldest, is stung by a bee. Without Benadryl, he dies. Panicked, the children lie about the events leading up to Cal's death, which remain ambiguous.

The novel moves to Franny's life in her twenties. She works as a cocktail waitress in Chicago after dropping out of law school. While waitressing, she meets Leon Posen, a famous, much older author, and begins a relationship with him. Leon uses Franny's childhood, including Cal's death, as material for a best-selling novel titled Commonwealth. When Albie, a troubled drifter, reads the book and realizes it is about his life, he is furious and seeks out Leon. Their confrontation leads to the breakdown of Franny and Leon's relationship.

The story returns to Fix, who is sick with esophageal cancer on his 83rd birthday. He wants to see the depiction of his life in the film adaptation of Commonwealth, which has come out years after Leon's death. He is disturbed by the film, and Franny and Caroline, now in their fifties, leave with him in the middle of the movie. Franny gets a phone call from Albie, who is worried about his mother Teresa's health. Franny, Caroline, and Fix check on Teresa and realize that they must take her to the hospital. Teresa dies at the hospital.

The novel ends with another party thrown by Beverly, who has divorced Bert and remarried. Franny, married with two step-children, briefly leaves the Christmas party and drives to Bert's house nearby. After visiting Bert, she stands on his porch and recalls a memory when she and Albie were the only children living in the house. Franny realizes she is happy that she did not share that memory with Leon.

== Development history ==
In an interview titled "Ann Patchett Calls 'Commonwealth' Her 'Autobiographical First Novel'," Patchett said, "My parents got divorced when I was young, and my mother married someone who had four children. And we moved to the other side of the country, albeit not to Virginia. And I think that that being thrown together, being pulled out of a family and put into a family has always been very interesting to me. ... It's so complicated. It's so complicated to figure out who you're going to spend Christmas with." Noting that many authors' first novels are based on their own experience, Patchett explained that she had started her career wanting "to prove that I had this great imagination. But the wonderful thing about publishing this book at 52 is that I know that I am capable of working from a place of deep imagination. Now I just feel like I own every part of myself and my life and my imagination and the rocky terrain of my own brain, and that feels really good."

== Major themes ==
=== Fact in fiction ===
Patchett used her own memories in writing this novel, and in it, she raises the question of whether writing fiction based on real events and people is inherently exploitative. The famous novelist in the book, Leon Posen, uses Franny's childhood memories."He said that what she had told him was nothing but the jumping-off point for his imagination ... It wasn't her family. No one would see them there." But, of course, Franny's sibling and her step-siblings do see themselves there. This famous stranger's book is a jarring act of exposure and misrepresentation of their most private moments." Prior to Commonwealth, Patchett often set novels abroad—the idea for the plot of Bel Canto came from an actual hostage crisis in Peru that she had read about in the news. In an interview about Commonwealth, Patchett said, "I've always been writing about my family, but up until now I'd been very clever to hide everyone in giant costumes made out of chicken wire and masking tape." She had consulted her family before publishing Commonwealth, but about her own feelings said, "I have a real fear that the whole publication of this novel is going to center around questions of autobiography, .... Most of the things in this book didn't actually happen, but the feelings are very close to home. Or, as my mother [the novelist Jeanne Ray] said, "None of it happened and all of it's true."

=== Time ===
Events in Commonwealth begin in the 1960s and take place over 50 years. Interviewed in Slate Patchett said, "One of the things I'm obsessed with in all my books is time, and I felt that time in my work was contracting. ... and so I was very interested in writing a book that covered more time. ... I wanted to be able to move through time and between characters..." According to Ron Charles of The Washington Post "In someone else's hands, "Commonwealth" would be a saga, a sprawling chronicle of events and relationships spread out over dozens of chapters. But Patchett is daringly elliptical here. Not only are decades missing, but they're also out of order. We're not so much told this story as allowed to listen in from another room as a door swings open and closed." Jeanne Brown, in the Los Angeles Times, wrote, "The present story lines are overshadowed by the events of the past, the book's most contemporary scenes existing primarily as an entrée to older memories."

== Reception ==
The novel received a strongly positive critical response, with critics describing it as "breathtaking, perceptive, and poignant" and "full of wit and warmth." Several reviewers highlighted its emotional resonance. In Publishers Weekly, Carolyn Juris described it as "a funny, sad, and ultimately heart-wrenching family portrait."

Jennifer Senior observed in The New York Times, "Ms. Patchett has long explored the awkwardness, pain and grace that come when total strangers are forced into unexpected alliances. This theme found its fullest expression in her 2001 best seller, Bel Canto, whose glamorous characters were taken hostage at a birthday party. But a far more common form of involuntary companionship — which doesn't involve guns but often feels like it does — is the blended family. Tolerating your own kin is hard enough. Tolerating someone else's is harder by a coefficient of 10." As Ron Charles explained in The Washington Post, early in the novel "... we're thoroughly invested in these families, wrapped up in their lives by Patchett's storytelling, which has never seemed more effortlessly graceful. This is minimalism that magically speaks volumes," Janelle Brown of the Los Angeles Times said, "Reading 'Commonwealth' is a transporting experience, as if you've stepped inside Patchett's own juice-saturated memories and are seeing scenes flash by, in all their visceral emotion. It feels like Patchett's most intimate novel, and is without a doubt one of her best." In a starred review, Kirkus Reviews said, "The prose is lean and inviting, but the constant shifts in point of view, the peripatetic chronology, and the ever growing cast of characters will keep you on your toes. A satisfying meat-and-potatoes domestic novel from one of our finest writers." Kate Kellaway of The Guardian described Patchett as "a pleasure to read: there is a no-fuss casualness to the prose that is only possible when a writer is in control of every word and she is master of her art."

The novel was a finalist for the 2016 National Book Critics Circle Award for Fiction.
