= Institute for Applied Research and Community Collaboration =

Non-profit organization

The Institute for Applied Research and Community Collaboration (ARCC) is a non-profit organization located in Spring Valley, New York which conducts research on the Orthodox Jewish community. The organization was founded in 2011 by Dr Isaac Schechter.
