= State of Wonder =

2011 novel by Ann Patchett

- First edition (UK)
- Author: Ann Patchett
- Language: English
- Publisher: Bloomsbury (UK); Harper (US)
- Publication date: 2011
- Publication place: United Kingdom
- Media type: Print
- Pages: 368
- ISBN: 1-4088-1859-0

State of Wonder is a 2011 novel by American author Ann Patchett. It is the story of pharmacologist Marina Singh, who journeys to Brazil to bring back information about seemingly miraculous drug research being conducted there by her former teacher, Dr. Annick Swenson. The book was published by Bloomsbury in the United Kingdom and by Harper in the United States. It was well received by critics, and was nominated for the Wellcome Trust Book Prize and the Orange Prize for Fiction, among other nominations.

== Characters ==
- Dr. Marina Singh: Protagonist - a drug company employee who reluctantly goes to the Brazilian jungle to learn more about her colleague who went missing on exactly the same mission, and to verify her mentor's drug research
- Dr. Annick Swenson: a fierce doctor and researcher, and Dr. Singh's former teacher
- Mr. Fox: CEO of Dr. Singh's company, and also her lover
- Dr. Anders Eckman: Dr. Singh's office mate, who reportedly died when sent on the same mission as Dr. Singh
- Easter: young native boy who accompanies Dr. Swenson

== Plot summary ==
The novel opens with Dr. Marina Singh reading a letter from Dr. Annick Swenson to Dr. Singh's boss and secret lover, Mr. Fox, CEO of the pharmaceutical company Vogel. The letter reports the death of Dr. Anders Eckman, Swenson's colleague at a drug research site in the Amazon rainforest. When Eckman's widow begs Dr. Singh to find out what happened, Mr. Fox agrees to send Dr. Singh to the Amazon. Mr. Fox's other motive is that Dr. Swenson was given a blank check to conduct research into a new miracle drug, and refuses to inform him of her progress.

Finding Dr. Swenson proves to be difficult. Dr. Singh flies to Manaus, Brazil, and finds that the only people who know Dr. Swenson's whereabouts are an Australian couple named Jackie and Barbara Bovender, who are tasked with hiding her whereabouts from the outside world. Eventually Dr. Swenson surprises Dr. Singh in Manaus, and they travel in a boat piloted by a young deaf boy named Easter to the rainforest research site, near the encampment of an indigenous people called the Lakashi tribe. The women of this tribe bear children until the end of their lives, an ability they gain from eating the bark of an endemic tree called the martin. The drug whose research Vogel is funding is one that will prevent or undo menopause and allow women to give birth throughout their lives. Over time, Dr. Singh discovers that, unknown to Vogel, the bark of the martin also serves as a vaccination against malaria; it is this drug that Dr. Swenson is primarily concerned with. She fears that no pharmaceutical company would fund such an unprofitable venture, so she uses secrecy to acquire the funds for her humanitarian project; also, she worries that the Lakashi people would be destroyed if the outside world discovered the potential of the martins. Dr. Singh learns that Dr. Swenson has become pregnant, at the age of 73, making herself the first human test subject for the fertility drug.

Mr. Fox eventually visits the research site with Mrs. Bovender and a local taxi driver named Milton. En route, their boat was attacked by a possibly cannibalistic tribe. During the fracas, Mrs. Bovender sees a white man among them who she thinks is her father. Dr. Singh allows Mr. Fox to leave without finding out the dual purpose of the drug he has been funding. Meanwhile, Dr. Swenson's fetus has died and she has Dr. Singh perform a Caesarian section on her; the baby is born still and with sirenomelia. Afterwards Dr. Swenson tells Dr. Singh of her suspicion that the man Mrs. Bovender saw was possibly Dr. Eckman, whose death she had never confirmed. Along with Easter, Dr. Singh sets out to rescue Dr. Eckman. When they find the tribe, Dr. Eckman is indeed living among them, but Dr. Singh discovers that the only way they will give him up is to exchange Easter for Dr. Eckman. Dr. Singh and Dr. Eckman return to camp without Easter; Dr. Swenson is outraged that the boy she cared for was left behind. Dr. Singh and Dr. Eckman return to Minnesota; Dr. Eckman rejoins his wife and sons, and Dr. Singh continues on home.

== Critical reception ==
The book received mostly favorable reviews. Writing in the New York Times, Fernanda Eberstadt calls the novel “an engaging, consummately told tale.” In the same newspaper, Janet Maslin’s review praises the novel, writing that “this book’s central issue, its unresolved rivalry…[is] the dragon of a teacher who lurks somewhere in every student’s academic history.”

Laura Ciolkowski calls it “a suspenseful jungle adventure with an unexpected ending and other assorted surprises,” but complains about the novel's “tendency to…offer up a curiously clichéd view of life beyond the knowable edges of home.” Susan Storer Clark writes that "Patchett’s gift for combining the mythic with the practical, her ability to create memorable characters and truly ingenious plot twists make State of Wonder a rich and rewarding read."

The novel was nominated for the Wellcome Trust Book Prize (2011), and shortlisted for the Orange Prize for Fiction (2012). It was listed for a Salon Book Award (2011), Christian Science Monitor Best Book (2011), Time Magazine's Best Books of the Year (2011), The Morning News Tournament of Books (2012), Publishers Weekly's Top 10 Best Books (2011), and New York Times bestseller (2011).

In a second edition of State of Wonder, Bloomsbury Publishing incorrectly printed on the cover the novel had won the 2012 Orange Prize for Fiction, which actually went to Madeline Miller's debut The Song of Achilles, also published by Bloomsbury. The publisher blamed it on a printing error and claimed to pulp all remaining erroneous copies of State of Wonder.
