= Autobiography of a Face =

Memoir by Lucy Grealy

- Author: Lucy Grealy
- Language: English
- Genre: Autobiography/ Memoir
- Published: 1994
- Publisher: Harper Collins
- Publication place: United States
- ISBN: 978-0-544-83739-3

Autobiography of a Face is a memoir by the American poet Lucy Grealy. In the memoir, Grealy narrates her life before and after being diagnosed with Ewing's sarcoma at the age of nine. While the bulk of the memoir focuses on Grealy's childhood and adolescence, the final chapter is devoted to her time at college and graduate school. The memoir describes the emotional impact of growing up with the disease as well as the physical implications that it had on her face, which resulted in a lifetime of self-consciousness. When interviewed about the memoir in 1994 by Charley Rose, the author explained that the book's principal theme was identity.

The memoir first began as an essay, entitled Mirrorings, she was commissioned to write for an anthology. Prior to its publication in the anthology Grealy sold the essay to Harper's Magazine where it attracted enough attention to secure her an agent and a book deal.

The book was first published in 1994, and a British edition was released in 1995 under the name In the Mind's Eyes.

In 2004, following Grealy's death, her close friend Ann Patchett wrote the memoir Truth & Beauty, which documents the writing of Grealy's memoir and her life after the book found success.

== Plot summary ==
The prologue introduces the reader to Lucy's struggle with self-image. She describes her work at the stable Diamond D, which was her first job after finishing chemotherapy. Through this first narration, Lucy introduces her family's emotional and financial situation. She describes the stares that she received from children, noting that she was not sure if they were better or worse than the hidden looks from adults.

Lucy brings the reader back with flashbacks of fourth grade. Being a tomboyish girl, she played with boys and participate in dares. After an injury at school, she is diagnosed with a fractured jaw and requires emergency surgery. The memoir thoroughly describes her operation and her experience with anesthesia and says that back to school she felt like a warrior for experiencing something the other kids had not.

Six months after her operation, “a bony knob” had appeared at the tip of her jaw. She returns to the hospital and undergoes multiple tests, including a bone marrow examination. She is diagnosed with Ewing's sarcoma, however, no one describes it to her as cancer until further in the disease which makes her not assimilate the diagnosis as she should. She meets Derek at the hospital and he becomes her partner in mischievous adventures around the hospital. The right side of Lucy's jaw is removed in an operation. Afterward, she sensed her family's discomfort due to the way she looked.

Lucy starts chemotherapy and experiences pain more than ever. The treatment made her nauseous and cause vomiting, and as she recovered it was once again time for the treatment. She dreaded her treatment days, so much that she tried to get her white blood cell count up so that the treatment could not be administered. She starts wondering about the idea of God and starts realizing how her disease was not only affecting her but also the rest of her family. As a result of the chemotherapy, her hair starts falling out, causing more self-esteem issues.

When Lucy returns to school after missing much of fifth grade, boys start bullying her and making fun of her appearance. Later in high school, things get worse and she asks a counselor for help; the only thing he offers is to allow her to eat lunch at his office. During this time, she preferred the pain of chemotherapy to the pain of being bullied.

As Lucy's hair grows back, so does her confidence. She starts building new friendships, she still carries the weight of feeling that no one would ever love her in a romantic way. At the age of 16, she has her first reconstructive surgery and while not happy with the results, she hopes that the next surgery will truly bring her happiness. Though she has many surgeries, she is never truly being happy about her looks. In high school, even though no one said anything about her looks, she became her own judge and reminder of what she was lacking. Riding and reading helped her through her negative emotions.

She attended Sarah Lawrence College, and describes feeling acceptance for the first time because of the campus’ diverse atmosphere. She makes true friends for the first time during college.

As she encounters adulthood, being fulfilled with her career and having experienced some romantic relationships, Lucy starts to accept her image as it is and stops waiting for the physical beauty that will make her happy. She claims to have finally become "acquainted" with her face and feels whole after a long journey of not feeling good about herself.

== Characters ==
- Lucy: She is a girl that suffers from a very uncommon form of Ewing's sarcoma. This disease greatly affects Lucy for the rest of her life.
- Lucy's mother

== Reception ==
Autobiography of a Face has received reviews from Kirkus Reviews, Publishers Weekly, and Seventeen Magazine. The New York Times reviewed the book, stating that while some "will be disappointed that the author's new face is never described", the reviewer felt that this was irrelevant as "the text created a face for this reader, sculptured it down to the deeper-than-bone depths of character, a face that is taut, bright-eyed, fierce with intelligence and feeling -- complete." The Baltimore Sun also praised the work, stating that the writing was "both compelling and insightful".
