= St. Paul's Episcopal Church (Spring Valley, New York) =

Historic church in New York, United States

- U.S. National Register of Historic Places
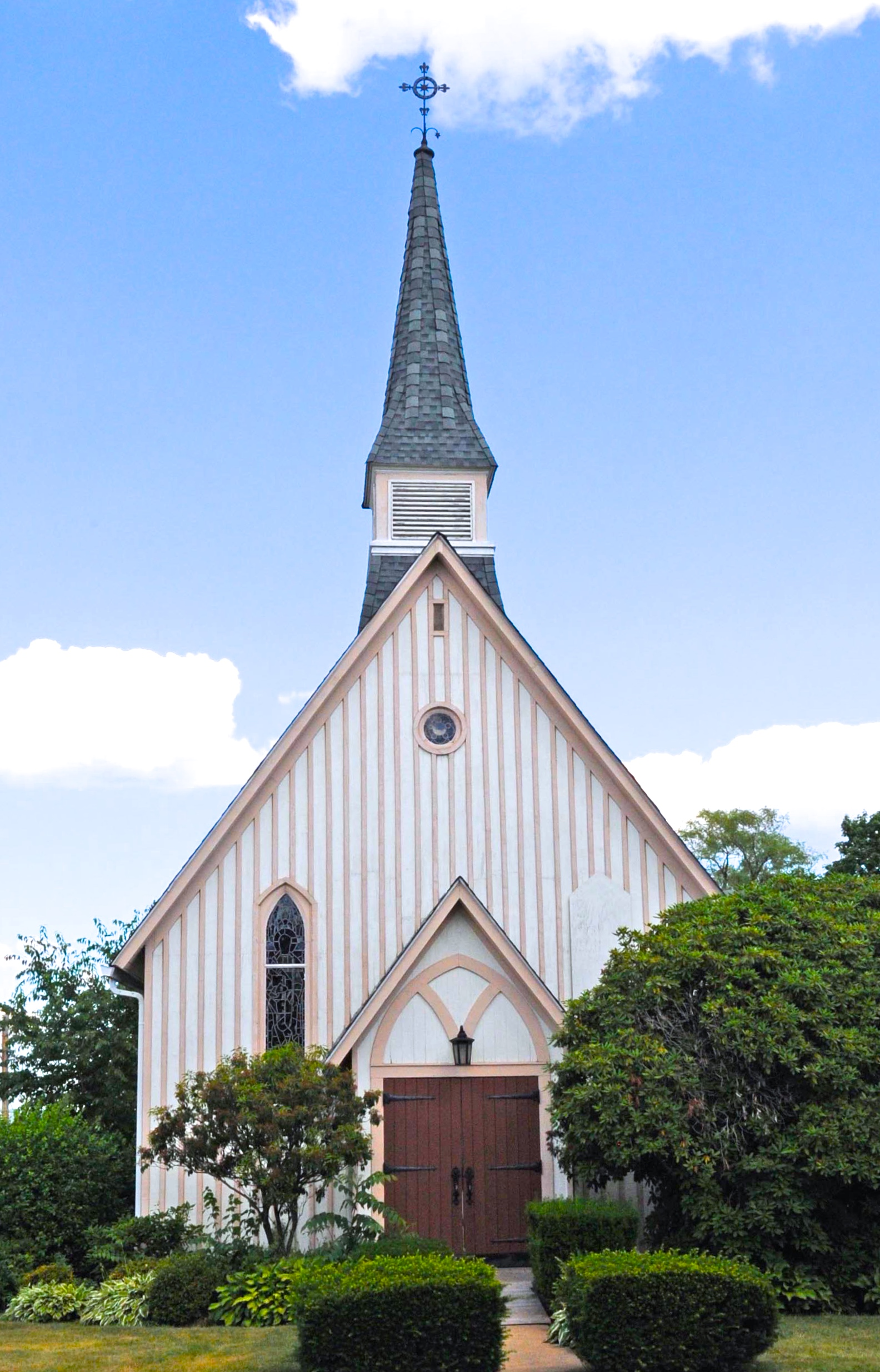

- Location within New York Location within the United States
- Location: 26 S. Madison Ave, Spring Valley, New York
- Coordinates: 41°6′32.13″N 74°2′45.19″W
- Area: 1 acre (0.40 ha)
- Built: 1872
- Architect: Haight, Charles Coolidge; Eickoff, Aaron
- Architectural style: Gothic Revival
- NRHP reference No.: 08000593
- Added to NRHP: July 2, 2008

St. Paul's Episcopal Church is a historic Episcopal church at 26 S. Madison Avenue in Spring Valley, Rockland County, New York. It was built in 1872 and is a frame Gothic Revival style parish church. The church reported 249 members in 2015 and 103 members in 2023; no membership statistics were reported in 2024 parochial reports. Plate and pledge income for the congregation in 2024 was $93,374 with average Sunday attendance (ASA) of 36.

It was listed on the National Register of Historic Places in 2008.
