= Tom Lake =

2023 novel by Ann Patchett

- First edition cover
- Author: Ann Patchett
- Audio read by: Meryl Streep
- Language: English
- Publisher: Harper
- Publication date: August 1, 2023
- Publication place: United States
- Media type: Print (hardcover), e-book, audiobook
- Pages: 320
- ISBN: 978-0-06-332752-8

Tom Lake is a 2023 novel by Ann Patchett. It was published by Harper on August 1, 2023. The book relates the story of three daughters who yearn to know about their mother's youthful relationship with a famous actor. Upon its release, the book was met with mostly positive reviews from book critics, who praised it as the author's prime material.

== Premise ==
Three daughters, Emily, Maisie, and Nell, return to their family's Northern Michigan cherry orchard in the spring of 2020 at the height of the COVID-19 pandemic, and learn about their mother's relationship with famous actor Peter Duke, with whom she shared the stage in Our Town at a theatre company named Tom Lake in the 1980s.

== Reception ==
The novel debuted at number one on The New York Times fiction best-seller list for the week ending August 5, 2023. According to Publishers Weekly, the novel sold more than 38,000 copies in its first week. In 2024, the book was one of the most borrowed titles in American public libraries.

Kirkus Reviews gave the novel a starred review, writing, "These braided strands culminate in a denouement at once deeply sad and tenderly life-affirming. Poignant and reflective, cementing Patchett's stature as one of our finest novelists." The novel was also well received at Publishers Weekly, which noted in its review, "As Patchett's slow-burn narrative gathers dramatic steam, she blends past and present with dexterity and aplomb, as the daughters come to learn more of the truth about Lara's Duke stories, causing them to reshape their understanding of their mother. Patchett is at the top of her game."

Benjamin Markovits of The Daily Telegraph gave the novel 4 out of 5 stars, comparing its qualities to Thornton Wilder's play Our Town, which features in Patchett's novel. Grace Linden of the Los Angeles Review of Books agreed, writing, "Our Town, a play about loss and the inability to appreciate life as it happens, is the perfect foil for Patchett's story."

Katy Waldman of The New Yorker wrote, "The ingredients have been assembled for a wistful meditation on mothers and daughters learning to handle the seasons of their lives [...] But the novel's alchemical transformation of pain into peace feels, at times, overstated [...] As Tom Lake goes on, the determined positivity begins to feel slightly menacing, or at least constrictive." Alice O'Keefe of The Times echoed the latter criticism, writing that the novel "seems to almost wilfully ignore the darker side of life. You'll happily while away an afternoon with it, if you like your fiction as sticky-sweet as cherry pie."

Writing for The Washington Post, Marion Winik wrote, "Tom Lake is about romantic love, marital love and maternal love, but also the love of animals, the love of stories, love of the land and trees and the tiny, red, cordiform object that is a cherry. Not that a heart is not broken at some point, but it breaks without affecting the remarkable warmth of the book, set in summer's fullest bloom...This generous writer hits the mark again with her ninth novel."
