= These Precious Days =

2021 essay collection by Ann Patchett

- Author: Ann Patchett
- Cover artist: Sooki Raphael
- Language: English
- Genre: Essays
- Publisher: Harper
- Publication date: November 23, 2021
- Publication place: United States
- Pages: 336
- ISBN: 978-0-06-309278-5
- Preceded by: This Is the Story of a Happy Marriage

These Precious Days is a 2021 essay collection by American writer Ann Patchett. It received “rave” reviews and became a New York Times best seller.

== Publication ==
These Precious Days was published on November 23, 2021, by Harper. The 336-page collection contains 24 essays, some previously published but revised for the collection.

== Contents ==
The essays range in subject, but often consider relationships in Patchett's personal and professional life, including with her father and stepfathers; her decision not to have children; the close friendship she develops in the early days of the COVID-19 pandemic with Tom Hanks' assistant Sooki Raphael. Patchett's life as a writer, from her earliest grade school writing, through college and graduate school, magazine writing, novels and ultimately selling books at her Nashville independent bookstore Parnassus Books, is woven throughout.

== Reception ==
Publishers Weekly gave These Precious Days a starred review, calling it “eloquent” and saying Patchett writes “poignantly—and often with wry humor”. In The New York Times, Alex Witchel called the collection “excellent”, saying “Patchett’s heart, smarts and 40 years of craft create an economy that delivers her perfectly understated stories emotionally whole.” In The Washington Post, Michele Filgate praised Patchett's “welcoming and comforting” prose.

On December 12, 2021, These Precious Days made The New York Times Best Seller list for hardcover non-fiction, and has remained on it through January 2, 2022. Former US president Barack Obama named it to his list of favorite books he read in 2021.
