= The Magician's Assistant =

1997 novel by Ann Patchett

- Author: Ann Patchett
- Language: English
- Publisher: Harcourt
- Publication date: 1997
- Publication place: USA
- Pages: 368
- ISBN: 978-0-15-100263-4

The Magician's Assistant is the third novel by American author Ann Patchett, published in 1997 by Harcourt. The book was shortlisted for the 1998 Women's Prize for Fiction. The narrative follows a young woman named Sabine in the aftermath of her husband's death.

== Summary ==
A Los Angeles magician named Parsifal dies of a brain aneurism, leaving behind Sabine, his 41 year old widow and assistant for more than two decades. Parsifal was gay, marrying the worshipful Sabine out of affectionate appreciation only after the death of his lover, Phan, two years earlier. When Parsifal's will reveals not only the existence of a parent he'd always claimed was deceased but two sisters and a hidden past in Nebraska, Sabine sets out amidst depression and grief to discover the part of his life that her husband kept hidden.

== Reception ==
The New York Times praised the novel as "beguiling" but argued the protagonist "never generates enough sympathy to make her predicament truly absorbing." Writing in The Independent, Penelope Lively described The Magician's Assistant as "a lovely book by a writer to watch".

== Awards ==
The Magician's Assistant was shortlisted for the Women's Prize for Fiction in 1998.
