= The Dutch House (novel) =

2019 novel by Ann Patchett

- First edition cover
- Author: Ann Patchett
- Audio read by: Tom Hanks
- Language: English
- Publisher: Harper
- Publication date: September 24, 2019
- Publication place: United States
- Media type: Print (Hardcover)
- Pages: 352
- ISBN: 978-0-06-296367-3
- Dewey Decimal: 813/.54
- LC Class: PS3566.A7756 D88 2019

The Dutch House is a 2019 novel by Ann Patchett. It was published by Harper on September 24, 2019. It tells the story of a brother and sister, Danny and Maeve Conroy, who grow up in a mansion known as the Dutch House, and their lives over five decades.

The novel was a finalist for the 2020 Pulitzer Prize for Fiction.

The first edition U.S. cover featured a portrait by Noah Saterstrom that was specifically created for the cover. The novel heavily references a painted portrait of Maeve wearing a red coat that was commissioned when she was 10. Saterstrom created a portrait to match Patchett's description.

== Plot ==
Danny Conroy grows up in an elaborate mansion in Elkins Park, Pennsylvania known as the Dutch House, and is raised by his real estate investor father and his older sister Maeve; his mother had abandoned the family years earlier.

Danny's father Cyril is an emotionally distant man but raises his children to understand his business which involves investing in real estate and working as a landlord and property manager. Cyril eventually introduces the children to Andrea, a much younger woman with two daughters of her own, Norma and Bright. While Maeve and Danny do not like Andrea, Cyril eventually marries her, the two having bonded over their love of the Dutch house.

Nevertheless, Cyril and Andrea's marriage is not a success and Andrea maintains a distance between herself and the Conroy children. When Danny is 15 and Maeve is 22 their father abruptly dies of a heart attack at work. His employees call in Maeve who calls Danny and no one thinks to inform Andrea until later. Two weeks later Andrea, having assured herself of the fact that her husband's property passed entirely to her, kicks Danny out of the house and fires the housekeeper and cook who have acted as surrogate mothers to the Conroy children. An infuriated Maeve discovers that the only thing she could possibly access is a trust fund for education set up in the names of Danny, Norma and Bright. Maeve decides to send Danny to the most expensive schools she can find in order to drain the trust sending Danny to Choate Rosemary Hall, Columbia University, and to Columbia Medical School.

While training at medical school Danny meets Celeste, a bright young woman who could have been a doctor herself but because of the time period decides to be a doctor's wife instead. Danny is shocked when she proposes they marry his first year of medical school and he decides not to, a decision Celeste blames on Maeve. Danny completes medical school while dreaming of owning a real estate empire. Shortly before he must choose his graduation plans he manages to acquire, and then immediately sell, two parking lots on a tip from his mentor. Danny uses the money to launch a successful career in real estate. He then marries Celeste. They have two children, a girl named May and a boy named Kevin. Though Danny is financially successful Celeste grows increasingly bitter that he never used his medical degree and puts the blame for the strain of their marriage on Maeve.

For years Danny and Maeve develop a habit of driving to the Dutch House and sitting outside of it when Danny returns home. During this time the two reminisce about their childhoods. When they are in their 40s they finally see Andrea outside the house and realize that they are preoccupied with the past and decide to stop coming to the Dutch House. A few years later Maeve has a heart attack and to Danny and Maeve's surprise their mother, Elna, returns to nurse Maeve. Danny is still angry at his mother, whom he has no memories of, but Maeve is reinvigorated by her presence. They learn that she left because she felt uncomfortable living in the wealth of the Dutch House and that she has spent her subsequent years in service to the poor. For a year Maeve and their mother live together in harmony. One day when Danny is visiting their mother abruptly suggests they visit the Dutch House though Maeve and Danny are against it.

At the Dutch House they immediately see Andrea who mistakes Danny for his father. They learn that she is suffering from dementia. Their mother decides to stay in the house and nurse Andrea which horrifies Maeve. A few months later Maeve abruptly dies. Elna continues to nurse Andrea and Danny at least partially blames her for his sister's death.

After Maeve's death Danny and Celeste finally divorce and he spends more time at the Dutch House. He learns that his step-sister Norma was forced to become a doctor to compete with Danny and that his younger step-sister, Bright, became estranged from her mother after what she did to the Conroy children. The former household staff return to work at the Dutch House and Danny brings his children for visits where his older daughter May falls in love with the house.

Andrea eventually dies and May begs Norma not to sell the house for a few years until she becomes rich enough to buy it. To everyone's surprise she quickly becomes a rich and successful actress and is able to buy the Dutch House. Though Danny and Maeve had a lonely childhood in the house May uses it to entertain rich and famous celebrities.

== Background ==
Patchett was inspired to use Elkins Park as the novel's setting because when she was a student at Sarah Lawrence College she would spend holidays and weekends with her friend Erica Buchsbaum Schultz at her family's house in Wyncote, near Elkins Park and Jenkintown. Originally the book was set in Jenkintown, though when Patchett finished it, Schultz suggested that she move the setting to Elkins Park. She also chose Elkins Park given its proximity to New York, which she already knew would feature in the novel.

== Reception ==
Publishers Weekly gave the novel a positive starred review, writing, "Patchett's splendid novel is a thoughtful, compassionate exploration of obsession and forgiveness, what people acquire, keep, lose or give away, and what they leave behind."

The novel was also well received by Kirkus Reviews and noted in its review that, "Casually stated but astute observations about human nature are Patchett's stock in trade, and she again proves herself a master of aging an ensemble cast of characters over many decades. In this story, only the house doesn't change. You will close the book half believing you could drive to Elkins Park and see it."

Donna Seaman of Booklist praised the novel, comparing it to the works of F. Scott Fitzgerald and Alice McDermott, noting "Patchett is at her subtle yet shining finest."

Writing for The New York Times Book Review, author Martha Southgate's review reiterated the praise, noting, "This novel takes a winding road through the forest and doesn't rush to a finish, nor is the ending wholly surprising. But if you allow yourself to walk along with Patchett, you'll find riches at the end of the trail."

Donna Liquori of the Associated Press wrote, "Patchett's storytelling abilities shine in this gratifying novel."

=== Accolades ===
Year	Award	Result	Ref.
2019	Goodreads Choice Award for Best Historical Fiction	Nominated	
2020	Pulitzer Prize for Fiction	Finalist	
2020	Women's Prize for Fiction	Longlisted	
