= Lucy Grealy =

American poet

Lucy Grealy

Lucinda Margaret Grealy (June 3, 1963 – December 18, 2002) was an Irish-American poet and memoirist who wrote Autobiography of a Face in 1994. This critically acclaimed book describes her childhood and early adolescent experience with cancer of the jaw, which left her with some facial disfigurement. In a 1994 interview with Charlie Rose conducted right before she rose to the height of her fame, Grealy stated that she considered her book to be primarily about the issue of "identity."

== Biography ==
Grealy was born in Dublin, Ireland, and her family moved to the United States in April 1967, settling in Spring Valley, New York. She was diagnosed at age 9 with a rare form of cancer called Ewing's sarcoma. Treatment for this often fatal cancer (Grealy reports an estimated 5% survival rate using therapies available at the time of her diagnosis) led to the removal of her jawbone, and over the following years she had many facial reconstructive surgeries. In her memoir, Autobiography of a Face, Grealy describes her life from the time of her diagnosis and how she weathered the cruelty of schoolmates and others, suffering taunts and stares from strangers.

At 18, Grealy entered Sarah Lawrence College where she made her first real friends and nurtured her love of poetry. She graduated in 1985 and went on to study at the Iowa Writers' Workshop. In Iowa she lived with fellow writer Ann Patchett. Their friendship is the subject of Patchett's 2004 memoir Truth & Beauty: A Friendship.

In 1991, she was awarded a Bunting Fellowship at the Radcliffe Institute for Independent Study, where she completed her memoir. In 1995, the book won Grealy a Whiting Award, given to young writers of exceptional talent.

She published a collection of essays in 2000, As Seen on TV: Provocations. She taught writing at Bennington College and New School University.

Following her final reconstructive surgery, Grealy became dependent upon her prescribed painkiller, OxyContin, as she had earlier with codeine. She died of a heroin overdose on December 18, 2002, in New York City, at age 39.

Her sister, Suellen Grealy, was opposed to Ann Patchett's timing in publishing Truth and Beauty. While she claims that Patchett and the book's publisher HarperCollins stole the Grealy family's right to grieve privately, she acknowledges that "Ann was a far better 'sister' to Lucy than I could ever have been".

== Awards ==
- 1995 Whiting Award

Lucy Grealy won several prizes for her poetry, among them the Sonora Review Prize, the London TLS poetry prize and two Academy of American Poets awards.

== Works ==
- Everyday Alibis, a chapbook of poems
- Autobiography of a Face (1994). HarperCollins. 2003. ISBN 978-0-06-056966-2.
  - In the Mind's Eye. Arrow. 1995. ISBN 978-0-09-932701-1. (Renamed British edition of Autobiography of a Face)
- As Seen on TV: Provocations. Tandem Library. 2001. ISBN 978-1-4177-2621-9.

=== Anthologies ===
- Robert Atwan, ed. (2001). The best American essays. Houghton Mifflin Co. ISBN 978-0-618-04297-5.
- Lynn Z. Bloom, ed. (2000). The essay connection: readings for writers. Houghton Mifflin Co. ISBN 978-0-618-03965-4.

=== Essays ===
- "Autobiography of a Body". Nerve. October 1997. Archived from the original on 2016-08-10.
