= The Patron Saint of Liars (film) =

- Genre: Drama
- Written by: Ann Patchett; Lynn Roth
- Directed by: Stephen Gyllenhaal
- Starring: Dana Delany; Ellen Burstyn; Clancy Brown
- Theme music composer: Daniel Licht
- Country of origin: United States
- Original language: English

Production
- Executive producers: Kenneth Kaufman; Lynn Roth
- Producers: Stephen Gyllenhaal; Ann Kindberg; Ed Solorzano
- Cinematography: Greg Gardiner
- Editor: Brent White
- Running time: 100 minutes
- Production company: Patchett Kaufman Entertainment

Original release
- Network: CBS
- Release: April 5, 1998

The Patron Saint of Liars is a 1998 drama television film based on the novel of the same name by Ann Patchett. It tells the story of Rose Abbot, a young woman who abandons her life in California with her husband after finding out she is pregnant. She chooses a home for unwed mothers in Kentucky as her escape, hoping to give her child up for adoption and start over. The film stars Dana Delany, Ellen Burstyn and Clancy Brown. It premiered on April 5, 1998, on CBS. A miracle happens to make Rose go home and live with her family.

== Cast ==
- Dana Delany as Rose Cleardon Abbott
- Ellen Burstyn as June Clatterbuck
- Clancy Brown as Son
- Sada Thompson as Sister Evangeline
- Maggie Gyllenhaal as Lorraine Thomas
- Jill Gascoine as Mother Corrine
- Lisa Rieffel as Beatrice
- Marissa Ribisi as Angie
- Debra Christofferson as Sister Bernadette
