= Seth Joyner =

American football player (born 1964)

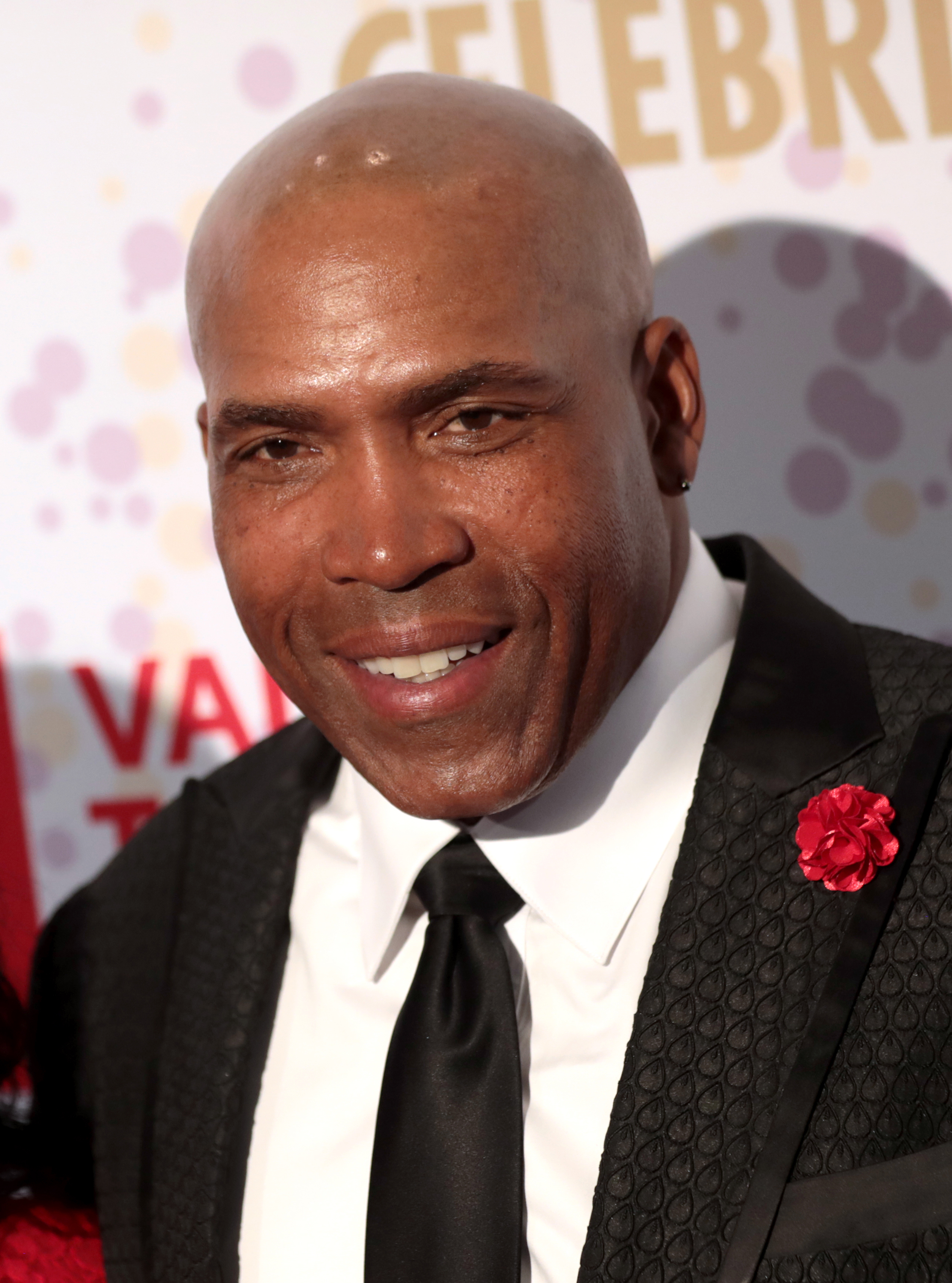
- Joyner in 2022

No. 59, 54, 99
- Position: Linebacker

Personal information
- Born: November 18, 1964 (age 61); Spring Valley, New York, U.S.
- Listed height: 6 ft 2 in (1.88 m)
- Listed weight: 245 lb (111 kg)

Career information
- High school: Spring Valley
- College: UTEP
- NFL draft: 1986: 8th round, 208th overall pick

Career history
- Philadelphia Eagles (1986–1993); Arizona Cardinals (1994–1996); Green Bay Packers (1997); Denver Broncos (1998)

Awards and highlights
- Super Bowl champion (XXXIII); 2× Second-team All-Pro (1991, 1992); 3× Pro Bowl (1991, 1993, 1994); Philadelphia Eagles 75th Anniversary Team; Philadelphia Eagles Hall of Fame

Career NFL statistics
- Tackles: 1,123
- Sacks: 52
- Forced fumbles: 26
- Fumble recoveries: 12
- Interceptions: 24
- Interception yards: 307
- Defensive touchdowns: 5
- Stats at Pro Football Reference

Seth Joyner (born November 18, 1964), is an American former professional football player who was a linebacker in the National Football League (NFL) for the Philadelphia Eagles, Arizona Cardinals, Green Bay Packers and Denver Broncos. Joyner graduated from Spring Valley High School and played college football for the UTEP Miners.

== Professional career ==
Joyner was selected by the Philadelphia Eagles in the eighth round (208th overall) of the 1986 NFL draft. He was actually cut in training camp, but the Eagles re-signed him later in the season. Joyner played in the NFL for the Philadelphia Eagles (1986–1993), Arizona Cardinals (1994–1996), Green Bay Packers (1997), and the Denver Broncos (1998). Joyner's unique combination of strength and quickness allowed him to excel in all defensive statistical categories and propelled him to three Pro Bowl accolades; being selected in 1991, 1993, and 1994. In one Monday Night Football game in 1991 against the Houston Oilers, Joyner, playing with a 102-degree fever, recorded 8 solo tackles, 2 forced fumbles, 2 fumble recoveries and 2 sacks. He was named NFL Player of the Year by Paul Zimmerman of Sports Illustrated that year and received runner-up honors for Associated Press NFL Defensive Player of the Year, while a member of the Philadelphia Eagles. As a Green Bay Packer, he appeared in Super Bowl XXXII, and the next year, he won Super Bowl XXXIII as a member of the Broncos in 1998, which turned out to be his last game.

He is one of many members in the 20/20 Club for interceptions and sacks in NFL history. He is second in sacks behind Ted Hendricks (60.5) with 52.

Joyner is currently a football analyst on FS1 and on Eagles Pregame and Postgame Live on NBC Sports Philadelphia.

== NFL career statistics ==
Legend
	Won the Super Bowl
**Bold**	Career high

=== Regular season ===
Year	Team	Games		Tackles				Interceptions			Fumbles	
Year	Team	GP	GS	Cmb	Solo	Ast	Sck	Int	Yds	TD	FF	FR
1986	PHI	14	7	44	–	–	2.0	1	4	0	1	0
1987	PHI	12	12	96	–	–	4.0	2	42	0	2	2
1988	PHI	**16**	**16**	**136**	–	–	3.5	**4**	**96**	0	1	1
1989	PHI	14	14	123	–	–	5.0	1	0	0	3	0
1990	PHI	**16**	**16**	132	–	–	**7.5**	1	9	0	3	0
1991	PHI	**16**	**16**	110	–	–	6.5	3	41	0	**6**	**4**
1992	PHI	**16**	**16**	121	–	–	6.5	**4**	88	**2**	3	1
1993	PHI	**16**	**16**	113	–	–	2.0	1	6	0	2	0
1994	ARI	**16**	**16**	53	38	15	6.0	3	2	0	3	0
1995	ARI	**16**	**16**	70	50	20	1.0	3	9	0	1	3
1996	ARI	**16**	**16**	86	**64**	**22**	5.0	1	10	0	1	1
1997	GB	11	10	34	25	9	3.0	0	0	0	0	0
1998	DEN	**16**	1	5	4	1	0.0	0	0	0	0	0
Career		195	172	1,123	181	67	52.0	24	307	2	26	12
