= Ann Patchett =

American author (born 1963)

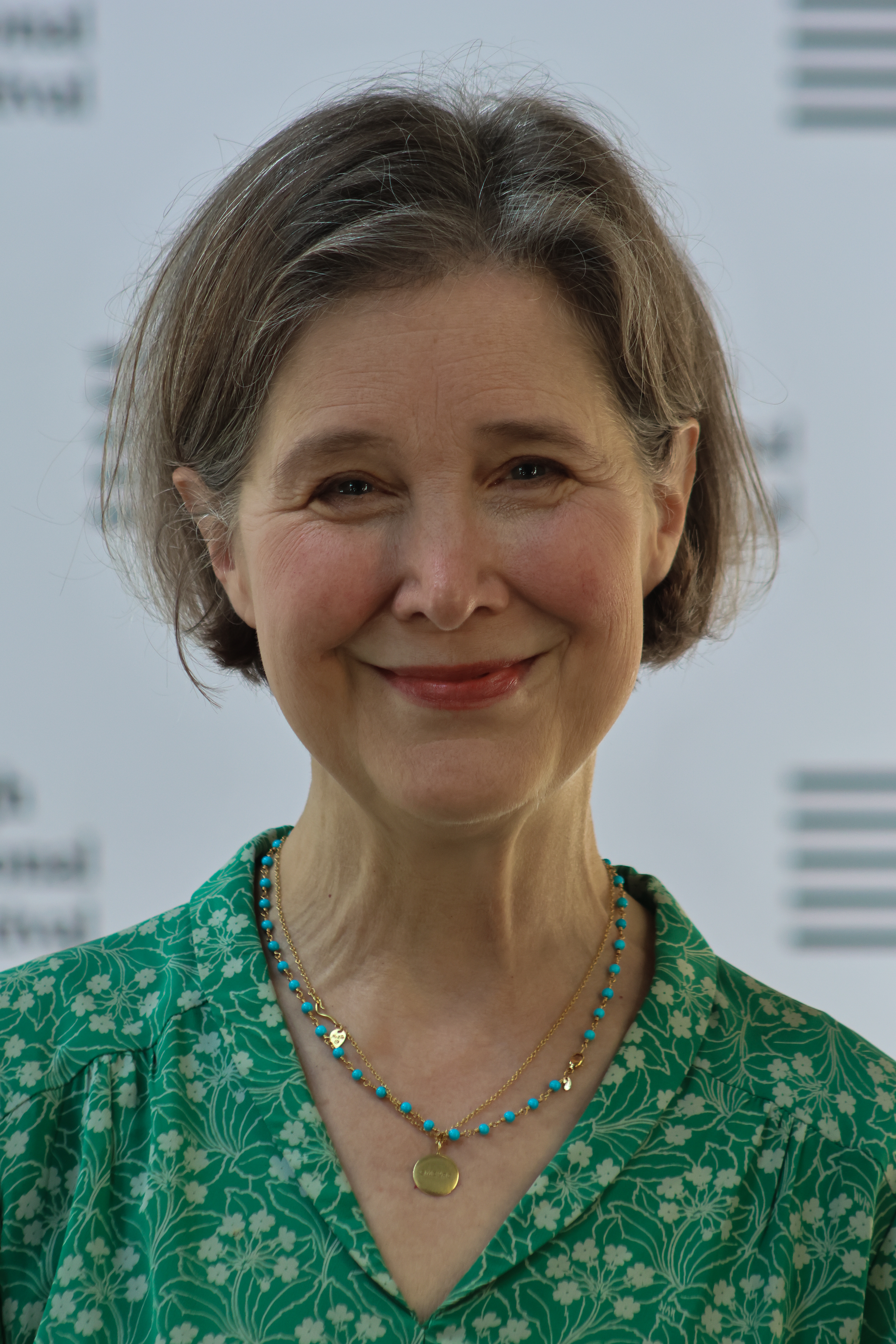
- Patchett at Edinburgh International Book Festival 2026
- Born: December 2, 1963 (age 62); Los Angeles, California, U.S.
- Education: Sarah Lawrence College (BA); University of Iowa (MFA)
- Occupations: Novelist; memoir writer
- Writing career
- Period: 1992–present
- Genre: Literary fiction
- Notable work: Bel Canto
- Website: annpatchett.com

Ann Patchett (born December 2, 1963) is an American author. In 2002, she received the PEN/Faulkner Award and the Orange Prize for Fiction for her novel Bel Canto. Patchett's other novels include The Patron Saint of Liars (1992), Taft (1994), The Magician's Assistant (1997), Run (2007), State of Wonder (2011), Commonwealth (2016), The Dutch House (2019), and Tom Lake (2023). The Dutch House was a finalist for the 2020 Pulitzer Prize for Fiction.

== Biography ==
Ann Patchett was born December 2, 1963 in Los Angeles, to Frank Patchett (a Los Angeles police captain who arrested Charles Manson and Sirhan Sirhan) and Jeanne Ray (a nurse who later became a novelist). She is the younger of two daughters. Her parents divorced when she was young. Her mother remarried and when Patchett was six years old the family moved to Nashville. She has described her stepfather as a "very, very weird guy" who had her carry a gun as early as age 16, and she partially attributes her disinterest in texting to his forcing her mother to carry a pager and respond to him on demand.

Patchett attended St. Bernard Academy, a private Catholic school for girls in Nashville run by the Sisters of Mercy. After graduation, she attended Sarah Lawrence College in Yonkers, New York.

After college, she attended the Iowa Writers' Workshop at the University of Iowa, where she lived with the memoirist and poet Lucy Grealy. Their time as roommates and their life-long friendship was the subject of her 2004 memoir Truth & Beauty. She married in her early twenties, but the marriage lasted only about a year.

Patchett won a fellowship to the Fine Arts Work Center in Provincetown, Massachusetts in her late twenties; during her time there she wrote her first novel, The Patron Saint of Liars, published in 1992. In 2010, she co-founded the bookstore Parnassus Books with Karen Hayes, in Nashville. It opened in November 2011. In 2016, Parnassus Books expanded, adding a bookmobile expanding the reach of the bookstore in Nashville. Patchett lives in Nashville with her husband, Karl VanDevender.

== Writing ==
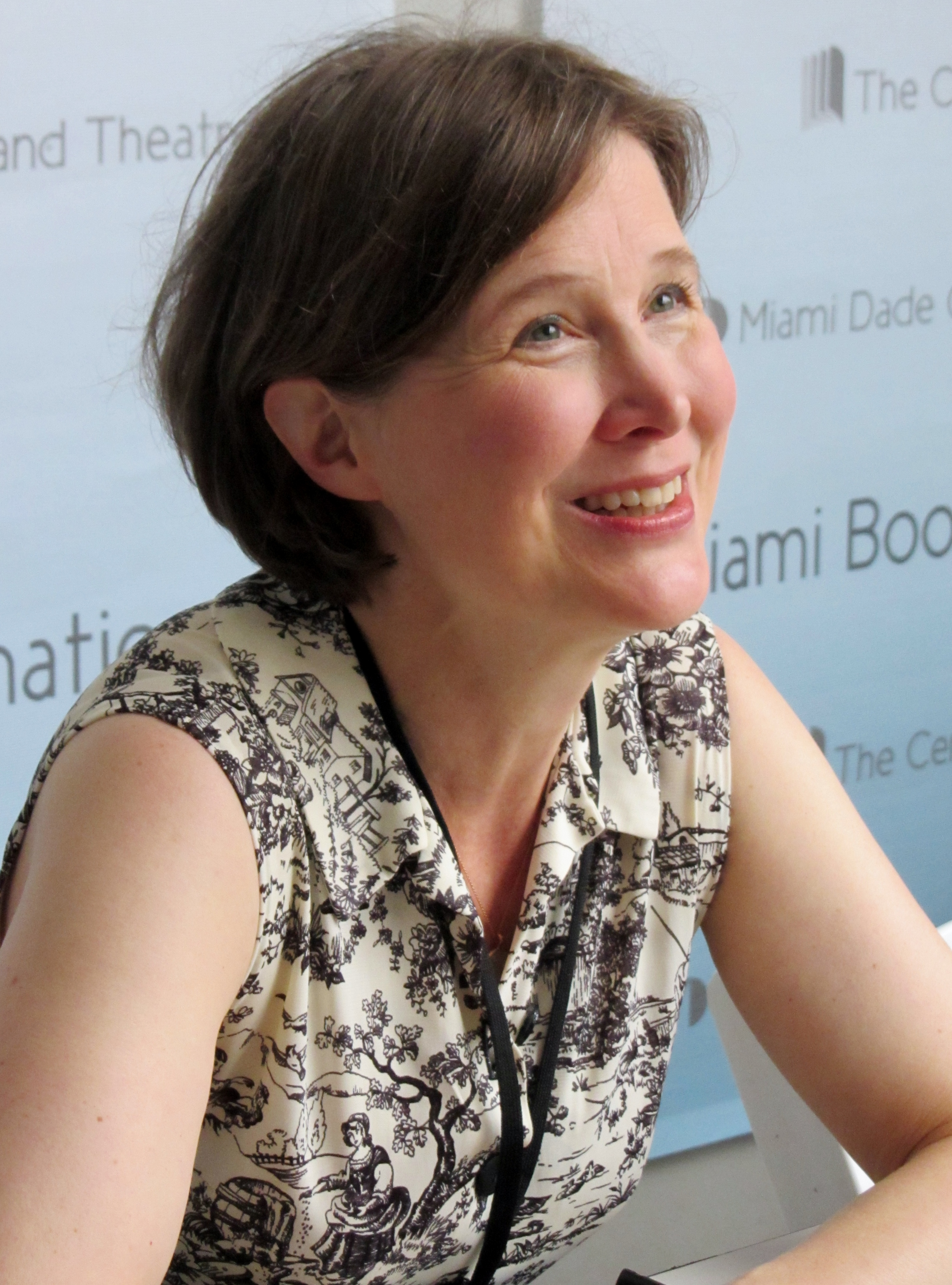
Patchett at the 2014 Miami Book Fair International in Miami

Patchett's first published work was in The Paris Review, a story that appeared before she graduated from Sarah Lawrence College. For nine years, Patchett worked at Seventeen magazine, where she wrote primarily non-fiction. The magazine only published one of every five articles she wrote. She ended her relationship with the magazine after getting into a dispute with an editor and exclaiming, "I’ll never darken your door again!"

Patchett has written for numerous publications including The New Yorker, The New York Times Magazine, The Washington Post, O, The Oprah Magazine, ELLE, GQ, Gourmet, and Vogue. In 1992, she published The Patron Saint of Liars. The novel was made into a television movie of the same title in 1998. Her second novel Taft won the Janet Heidinger Kafka Prize in fiction in 1994. Her third novel, The Magician’s Assistant, was released in 1997. In 2001, she achieved a breakthrough with her fourth novel Bel Canto, becoming a National Book Critics Circle Award finalist and winning the PEN/Faulkner Award.

A friend of writer Lucy Grealy, Patchett wrote a memoir about their relationship, Truth & Beauty: A Friendship. Patchett's novel, Run, was released in October 2007. What Now?, published in April 2008, is an essay based on a commencement speech she delivered at her alma mater in 2006. She is the editor of the 2006 volume of the anthology series The Best American Short Stories. In 2011, she published State of Wonder, a novel set in the Amazon jungle, which was shortlisted for the Orange Prize. In 2016 she published the novel Commonwealth to widespread critical acclaim. Patchett called the book her "autobiographical first novel," explaining, “The wonderful thing about publishing this book at 52 is that I know that I am [already] capable of working from a place of deep imagination.”

In 2019, Patchett published her first children's book, Lambslide, and the novel The Dutch House, a finalist for the 2020 Pulitzer Prize for Fiction. In November 2021, she published These Precious Days, an essay collection. In 2023, Ann Patchett published a novel called Tom Lake, and it made The New York Times Best Seller list.

When asked how to encourage people to slow down and contemplate more during a 2024 interview for the BBC, she responded:

Wouldn't it be lovely if people sat quietly for longer periods of time?... I do, because I write novels for a living... I'm very, very careful with myself because I don't want anything to disrupt my ability to concentrate on one thing for long periods of time. To that end, I do not watch television under any circumstances, I do not have a cell phone, and I participate in no form of social media. I have never looked at Facebook. That's kind of interesting, because my bookstore has a huge social media presence and I make videos about the books that I'm reading, but I never watch them.

Her work has been translated into more than 30 languages.

== Awards and honors ==
=== For specific works ===
- Nashville Banner Tennessee Writer of the Year Award, 1994
- Janet Heidinger Kafka Prize (Taft), 1994
- National Book Critics Circle Award finalist (Bel Canto), 2001
- PEN/Faulkner Award (Bel Canto), 2002
- Orange Prize (Bel Canto), 2002
- BookSense Book of the Year (Bel Canto), 2003
- Wellcome Trust Book Prize shortlist (State of Wonder), 2011

=== For corpus ===
- Guggenheim Fellowship, 1995 (mid-career)
- In 2012, Patchett was recognized on the Time 100 list as one of the most influential people in the world by Time.
- Peggy V. Helmerich Distinguished Author Award (body of work), 2014
- 2014 Kenyon Review Award for Literary Achievement
- Election to American Academy of Arts and Letters, 2017
- Election to American Academy of Arts and Sciences, 2020
- National Humanities Medal, 2021
- Carl Sandburg Literary Award from Chicago Public Library Foundation, 2024
- PEN/Audible Literary Service Award, 2026 (announced December 2, 2025)
- 2026 Ambassador Richard C. Holbrooke Distinguished Achievement Award from Dayton Literary Peace Prize Foundation
- 2026 Library of Congress Prize for American Fiction (announced June 23, 2026)

== Bibliography ==
=== Novels ===
- Patchett, Ann (1992). The Patron Saint of Liars. Boston, MA: Houghton Mifflin.
- — (1994). Taft. Boston, MA: Houghton Mifflin.
- — (1997). The Magician's Assistant. New York: Harcourt Brace.
- — (2001). Bel Canto. New York: HarperCollins.
- — (2007). Run. New York: HarperLuxe.
- — (2011). State of Wonder. New York: Harper.
- — (2016). Commonwealth. New York, NY: Harper.
- — (2019). The Dutch House. New York, NY: Harper.
- — (2023). Tom Lake. New York, NY: Harper.
- — (2026). Whistler. New York, NY: Harper.

=== Children's books ===
- Patchett, Ann (2019). Lambslide. HarperCollins.
- — (2020). Escape Goat. HarperCollins.
- — (2024). The Verts. HarperCollins.

=== Nonfiction ===
- Patchett, Ann (2004). Truth & beauty : a friendship. New York: Harper Collins.
- — (2008). What now?. New York: Harper.
- — (2011). The getaway car : a practical memoir about writing and life. Byliner.
- — (Spring 2011). "The Mercies". Granta. 114.
- — (2013). This is the story of a happy marriage. New York, NY: Harper.
- — (2013). "The Mercies". In Henderson, Bill (ed.). The Pushcart Prize XXXVII : best of the small presses 2013. Pushcart Press. pp. 166–181.
- — (2014). "How knitting saved my life. Twice". In Hood, Ann (ed.). Knitting yarns : writers on knitting. New York: W. W. Norton.
- — (2021). These precious days : essays. New York: HarperCollins.
- — (September 2021). "The Portrait Gallery : What the American Academy of Arts and Letters taught me about death". Essay. Harper's Magazine. 343 (2056): 53–55.

———————

Bibliography notes
