= R-Kal Truluck =

American football player (1974–2019)

No. 43, 98, 58, 53, 91, 96
- Position: Defensive end

Personal information
- Born: September 30, 1974; Brooklyn, New York, U.S.
- Died: November 29, 2019 (aged 45); Orlando, Florida, U.S.
- Listed height: 6 ft 4 in (1.93 m)
- Listed weight: 270 lb (122 kg)

Career information
- High school: Spring Valley (NY)
- College: Cortland
- NFL draft: 1997: undrafted

Career history
- Washington Redskins (1997)*; Saskatchewan Roughriders (1998–2000); St. Louis Rams (2001)*; Detroit Fury (2001); Washington Redskins (2001)*; Montreal Alouettes (2001); Detroit Fury (2002); Kansas City Chiefs (2002–2003); Green Bay Packers (2004); Arizona Cardinals (2005); Montreal Alouettes (2006–2007); Georgia Force (2008); Orlando Predators (2013)
- * Offseason or practice squad member only

Awards and highlights
- 1992 All-State and All-County; 1995 Division III All-America Second-team selection; 2× ECAC Upstate New York All-Star (1995–1996); 1996 Second-team All-East; 1996 Team MVP; AFL Rookie of the Year (2001); Lineman of the Year (2002); 2× First-team All-Arena (2001, 2002)

Career NFL statistics
- Tackles: 36
- Sacks: 8
- Stats at Pro Football Reference

Career CFL statistics
- Tackles: 141
- Sacks: 20
- Fumble recoveries: 6
- Stats at CFL.ca (archived)

Career AFL statistics
- Tackles: 53
- Sacks: 19
- Forced Fumbles: 7
- Fumble recoveries: 2
- Passes defended: 4
- Stats at ArenaFan.com

R-Kal K-Quan Truluck (/ˈɑːrkæl ˈtruːlʌk/ AR-kal TROO-luk; September 30, 1974 – November 29, 2019) was an American professional football player. Truluck died on November 29, 2019, due to complications from ALS.

== Early life ==
Truluck attended Spring Valley High School, where he lettered in football three times and was an all-state and all-county linebacker in his senior year. He spent his high school years growing up at the Lakeside Family & Children's Center in Rockland County, New York, a group foster home that he still visited in the offseason.

== College career ==
Truluck attended SUNY-Cortland, where he played in 35 career games with 27 starts. He recorded 238 tackles, 121 solo tackles, 21 sacks, two forced fumbles, two fumble recoveries and seven passes defensed.

As sophomore, Truluck had a successful season in which he recorded 64 tackles, six sacks, seven tackles-for-losses and two blocked field goal attempts in 10 games as a defensive end. Coaches thought to use more of his athletic ability so they changed his position to outside linebacker. As a junior, he started 10 games at outside linebacker and recorded 105 tackles, 6.5 sacks, five tackles-for-losses and two blocked field goal attempts. He was a Division III All-America second-team selection and named an ECAC Upstate New York All-Star. As a senior, he recorded 64 tackles, nine sacks, three tackles for loss and four blocked field goal attempts while earning second-team All-East honors. He was also named an ECAC Upstate New York All-Star in addition to being named team MVP by his teammates and coaches. Truluck graduated with a degree in health sciences.

== Professional career ==
After playing at Division III SUNY-Cortland, Truluck was signed as an undrafted free agent by the Washington Redskins of the National Football League. He signed on to the team's practice squad but was released in October 1997. In April 1998, he signed with the Saskatchewan Roughriders of the Canadian Football League, where he played from 1998 until 2000. In his rookie year there, Truluck recorded nine tackles and three sacks, winning the Defensive Player of the Week award for his debut. His season was cut short after four games due to post-concussion syndrome. Truluck signed with the AFL's Detroit Fury, where he played from 2001 to 2002. In 2001 Truluck amassed 8.0 sacks and becoming the "Rookie of the Year," following that season in 2002 Truluck became Arena Football's "Lineman of the Year" with 9.5 sacks. Truluck became well known for his speed and quickness, scouts began to make comparisons of Truluck's ability to Derrick Thomas. This landed Truluck a return to the NFL to play with the Kansas City Chiefs (2002–2004). In fourteen games of the 2003 season, Truluck recorded 17 tackles and six sacks. He was traded to the Green Bay Packers for a fifth- and a sixth-round draft choice during the 2004 preseason. Over the course of the season, he played in 10 games, recording 12 tackles and 2.5 sacks. He was released by the Packers and signed with the Arizona Cardinals before the 2005 season. In 10 games with the Cardinals, he recorded three tackles before returning to the CFL for the 2006-2007 seasons, which he spent with the Montreal Alouettes. In 2008 Truluck returned to the Arena Football league through a dispersal draft, being selected by the Georgia Force, during that season he amassed 30 tackles and 5.5 sacks. Truluck hosted his own live internet show with VoiceAmerica Sports, called "Inside the Trenches in Arizona". Truluck returned to football with Orlando Predators of the Arena Football League for the 2013 season.

== Death ==
On November 29, 2019, Truluck died from Lou Gehrig's Disease.
