= Spring Valley, New York =

Village in Rockland County, New York, United States

- Village
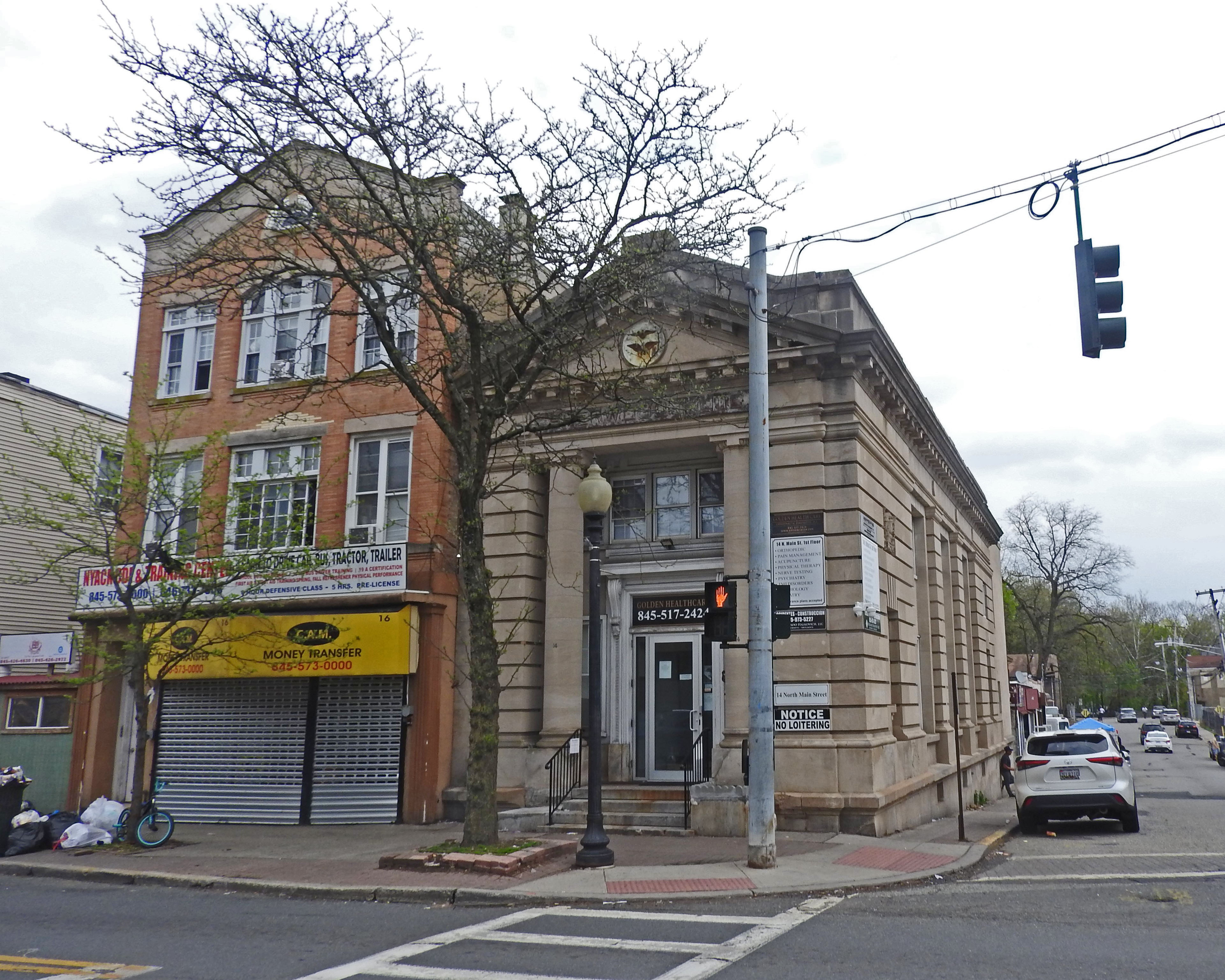
- North Main St.

- Seal

- Location in Rockland County and the state of New York.

- Location within the state of New York
- Coordinates: 41°6′52″N 74°2′52″W
- Country: United States
- State: New York
- County: Rockland
- Towns: Ramapo and Clarkstown
- Incorporated: July 9, 1902

Government
  - Mayor: Schenley Vital (D)
  - Deputy Mayor: Yisroel Eisenbach
  - Trustees: Yakov Yosef Kaufman, Shmuel Smith, and Joseph Gross

Area
  - Total: 2.01 sq mi (5.21 km^{2})
  - Land: 2.01 sq mi (5.20 km^{2})
  - Water: 0.0039 sq mi (0.01 km^{2})

Population (2020)
  - Total: 33,066
  - Estimate (2025): 34,482 ▲
  - Density: 17,155/sq mi (6,624/km^{2})
- Time zone: UTC-5 (Eastern (EST))
  - Summer (DST): UTC-4 (EDT)
- ZIP code: 10977
- Area code: 845
- FIPS code: 36-70420
- NWS SAME code: 036087
- Website: www.villagespringvalley.org

Spring Valley is a village in the town of Ramapo and Clarkstown in Rockland County, New York, United States. It is located north of Chestnut Ridge, east of Airmont and Monsey, south of Hillcrest, and west of Nanuet. The population was 33,066 at the 2020 census, making it the second most populous community in both Clarkstown and Rockland County, after New City.

Spring Valley spans the border of two towns, occupying an eastern portion of the town of Ramapo and a small western portion of the town of Clarkstown. The village is next to the New York State Thruway (Interstate 87) and is served by a New Jersey Transit train station at the terminus of the Pascack Valley Line.

Spring Valley is 22 miles (35 km) north of Manhattan and 5 miles (8 km) north of the New Jersey border.

== History ==
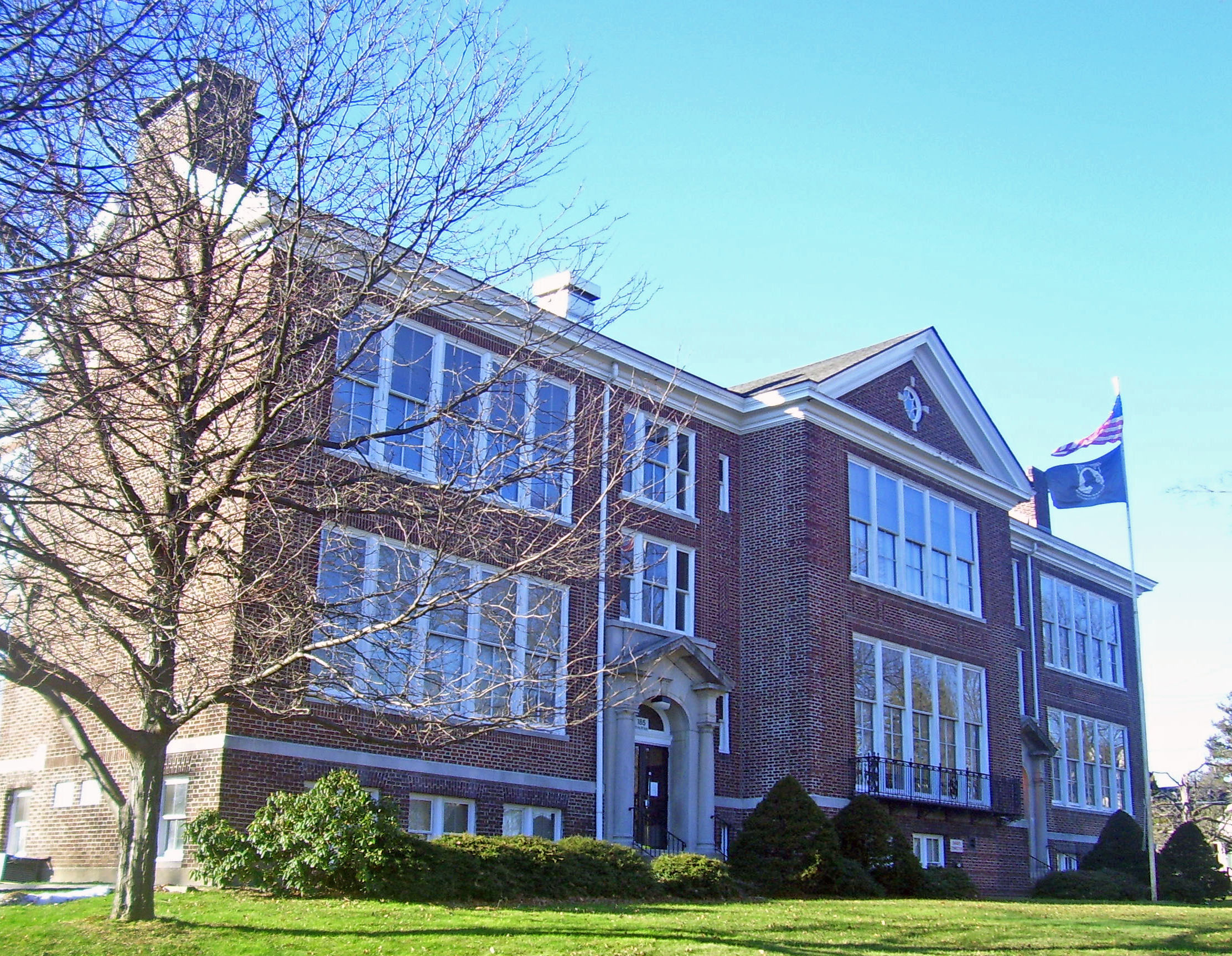
Former North Main Street School, now a satellite campus of Rockland Community College

Before the opening of the railroad, there were no homes in Spring Valley.

In 1842, the New York & Erie Railroad called this part of the territory "Pascack", after a stream by the same name. The residents of the area decided to call the place Spring Valley – one certain large spring in the Valley Pond being responsible for the name. Before naming the territory Spring Valley, it was called Scotland, named after their homeland, by Scotsmen who had settled in the area.

In 1885, E. P. Lespenasse, of Spring Valley, walked from Haverstraw, New York to Washington, D.C. to settle an election bet. He carried a live pig and a rooster on his month-long journey. Lespenasse sold over 600 copies of picture post cards of himself and the animals he carried before the start of his walk and along the way as souvenirs and to support his journey.

In 1914, President Theodore Roosevelt, visited Spring Valley to discuss the political issues of the day, speaking at Lyceum.

On July 21, 1919, the Valley Theatre was first opened.

In 1923, the Edwin Gould Foundation was incorporated. The Lakeside School for Girls and the Kingsland Industrial Schools for Boys opened on South Main street.

In 1929, Governor Franklin Delano Roosevelt was the principal speaker at the Fourth of July celebration in Spring Valley.

In 1948, President Harry S. Truman stopped at Spring Valley while touring the country in the last whistle-stop campaign by train.

Around World War II, Spring Valley had summer resorts that had many New York City Jewish people as customers. After World War II large resorts in the Catskill Mountains and other areas began to attract Jews instead, leaving the Spring Valley hotels empty. William Casey, Rockland County historian, said that many Hasidic groups began to settle during this period.

The final steam locomotives on the Erie Railroad were commuter engines that ran between Jersey City and Spring Valley. Steam last operated on the Erie on March 17, 1954, when the fires were dropped on K-1 class Pacific locomotive No. 2530.

In 2007, Spring Valley Mayor George Darden was elected vice president of the World Conference of Mayors during the organization's 23rd annual mayors' conference held in Port-au-Prince, Haiti. The organization includes mayors from the National Conference of Black Mayors and the Union of African Villages, whose goal is to foster constructive relationships among mayors around the world.

Revitalization measures are currently underway in the downtown area of the village, including a mass demolition of abandoned buildings on Main Street and the construction of new mixed-use commercial/residential buildings in its place.

=== Corruption in Spring Valley ===
- On August 4, 2014, Mayor Demeza Delhomme was locked up in the county jail after a state Supreme Court justice found him in contempt of a court order to open the village's civic center to host its summer camp.
- In 2015 the former mayor of Spring Valley, Noramie Jasmin, was convicted in federal court in the Southern District of New York of taking kickbacks to push through a community center and catering hall. She was also convicted of extortion and wire fraud and for selling her vote for $5,000 and a 50-percent ownership stake in the building. She served out a four-year prison term at Federal Prison Camp Alderson in West Virginia.
- In June 2015 former Spring Valley deputy mayor Joseph Desmaret was sentenced to three years in federal prison for his part in a corruption scheme involving a proposal to build a village-owned catering hall on Route 45 in Spring Valley.
- In November 2017 Spring Valley trustee Vilair Fonvil was found guilty of corruption charges that accused him of stealing $11,000 from a summer camp program, which ended his career as a village official.

== Geography ==
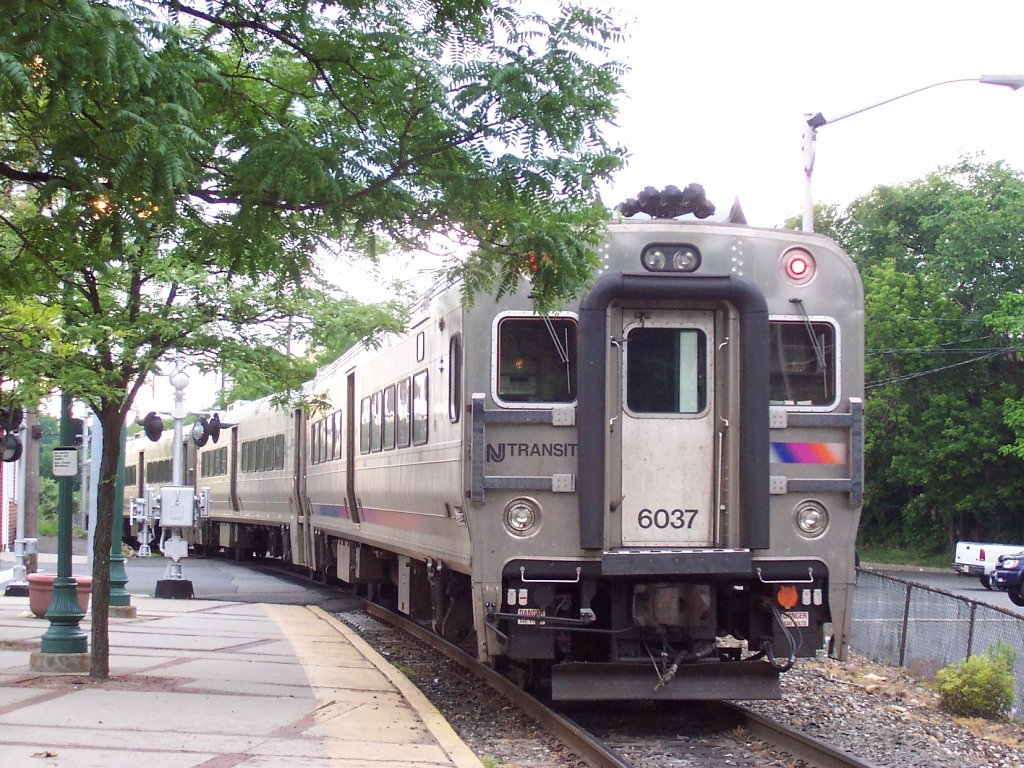
Pascack Valley Line train at the Spring Valley Transit Center

Spring Valley is located at 41°6′52″N 74°2′52″W (41.114445, −74.047771).

According to the United States Census Bureau, the village has a total area of 2.0 square miles (5.2 km^{2}), of which 0.004 square miles (0.01 km^{2}), or 0.10%, is water.

The village is approximately 5 miles (8 km) north of the New Jersey border.

== Demographics ==
Historical population
Census	Pop.	Note	%±
1880	810		—
1890	1,028		26.9%
1910	2,353		—
1920	3,818		62.3%
1930	3,948		3.4%
1940	4,308		9.1%
1950	4,500		4.5%
1960	6,538		45.3%
1970	18,112		177.0%
1980	20,537		13.4%
1990	21,802		6.2%
2000	25,464		16.8%
2010	31,347		23.1%
2020	33,066		5.5%
2025 (est.)	34,482		4.3%
U.S. Decennial Census 2020

=== 2020 census ===
As of the 2020 census, Spring Valley had a population of 33,066. The median age was 28.3 years. 35.1% of residents were under the age of 18 and 8.6% of residents were 65 years of age or older. For every 100 females there were 99.3 males, and for every 100 females age 18 and over there were 96.1 males age 18 and over.

100.0% of residents lived in urban areas, while 0.0% lived in rural areas.

There were 9,163 households in Spring Valley, of which 50.5% had children under the age of 18 living in them. Of all households, 49.1% were married-couple households, 17.0% were households with a male householder and no spouse or partner present, and 29.3% were households with a female householder and no spouse or partner present. About 19.6% of all households were made up of individuals and 8.3% had someone living alone who was 65 years of age or older.

There were 9,644 housing units, of which 5.0% were vacant. The homeowner vacancy rate was 2.1% and the rental vacancy rate was 3.6%.

Racial composition as of the 2020 census
Race	Number	Percent
White	11,193	33.9%
Black or African American	9,853	29.8%
American Indian and Alaska Native	327	1.0%
Asian	1,175	3.6%
Native Hawaiian and Other Pacific Islander	9	0.0%
Some other race	7,909	23.9%
Two or more races	2,600	7.9%
Hispanic or Latino (of any race)	10,689	32.3%

=== 2010 census ===
As of the 2010 United States census, there were 31,347 people living in the village. The racial makeup of the village was 39.4% White, 36.8% Black, 0.6% American Indian, 3.8% Asian, 0.1% Pacific Islander, 15.6% from some other race and 3.7% from two or more races. 30.6% were Hispanic or Latino of any race.

=== 2000 census ===
As of the census of 2000, there were 25,464 people, 7,566 households, and 5,523 families living in the village. The population density was 12,122.7 inhabitants per square mile (4,680.6/km^{2}). There were 7,812 housing units at an average density of 3,719.1 per square mile (1,436.0/km^{2}). The racial makeup of the village was 32.23% White, 59.98% African American, 0.40% Native American, 5.56% Asian, 0.25% Pacific Islander, 5.33% from other races, and 6.26% from two or more races. Hispanic or Latino of any race were 15.40% of the population.

There were 7,566 households, out of which 42.2% had children under the age of 18 living with them, 44.4% were married couples living together, 21.4% had a female householder with no husband present, and 27.0% were non-families. 20.6% of all households were made up of individuals, and 5.9% had someone living alone who was 65 years of age or older. The average household size was 3.33 and the average family size was 3.79.

In the village, the population was spread out, with 32.1% under the age of 18, 10.7% from 18 to 24, 31.7% from 25 to 44, 18.8% from 45 to 64, and 6.7% who were 65 years of age or older. The median age was 29 years. For every 100 females, there were 98.7 males. For every 100 females age 18 and over, there were 95.0 males.

The median income for a household in the village was $41,311, and the median income for a family was $42,097. Males had a median income of $31,182 versus $26,350 for females. The per capita income for the village was $14,861. 18.7% of the population and 15.2% of families were below the poverty line, 24.2% of those under the age of 18 and 16.5% of those 65 and older were living below the poverty line.

=== Ethnic communities ===
Spring Valley has the highest African American and Caribbean population in Rockland County. Spring Valley has a large Haitian and Jamaican population, along with a large and growing Hispanic population.

== Tourism ==
=== Historical markers ===
- United States Post Office – 7 North Madison Avenue

=== Landmarks and places of interest ===
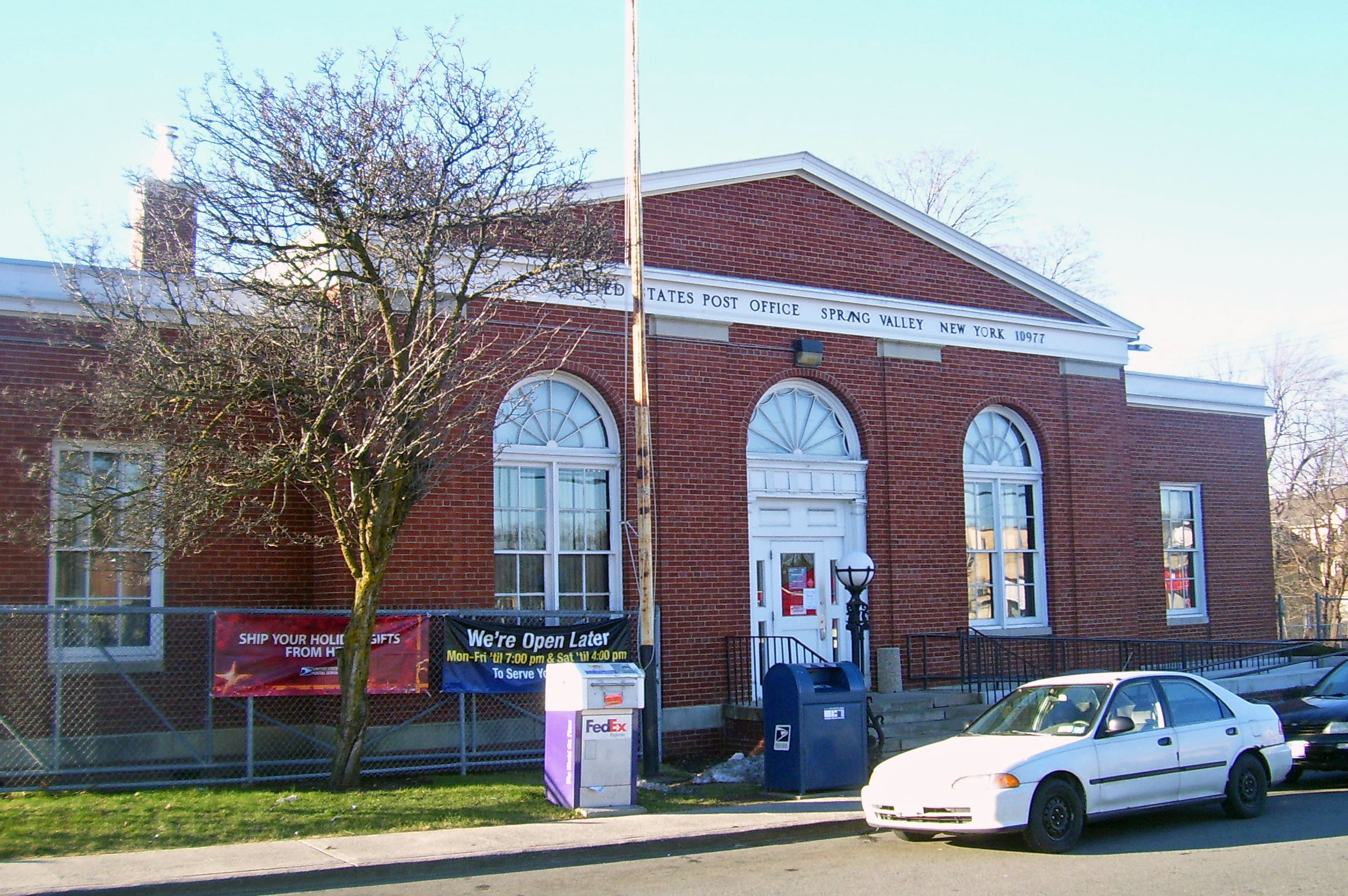
U.S. Post Office, Spring Valley, NY, USA

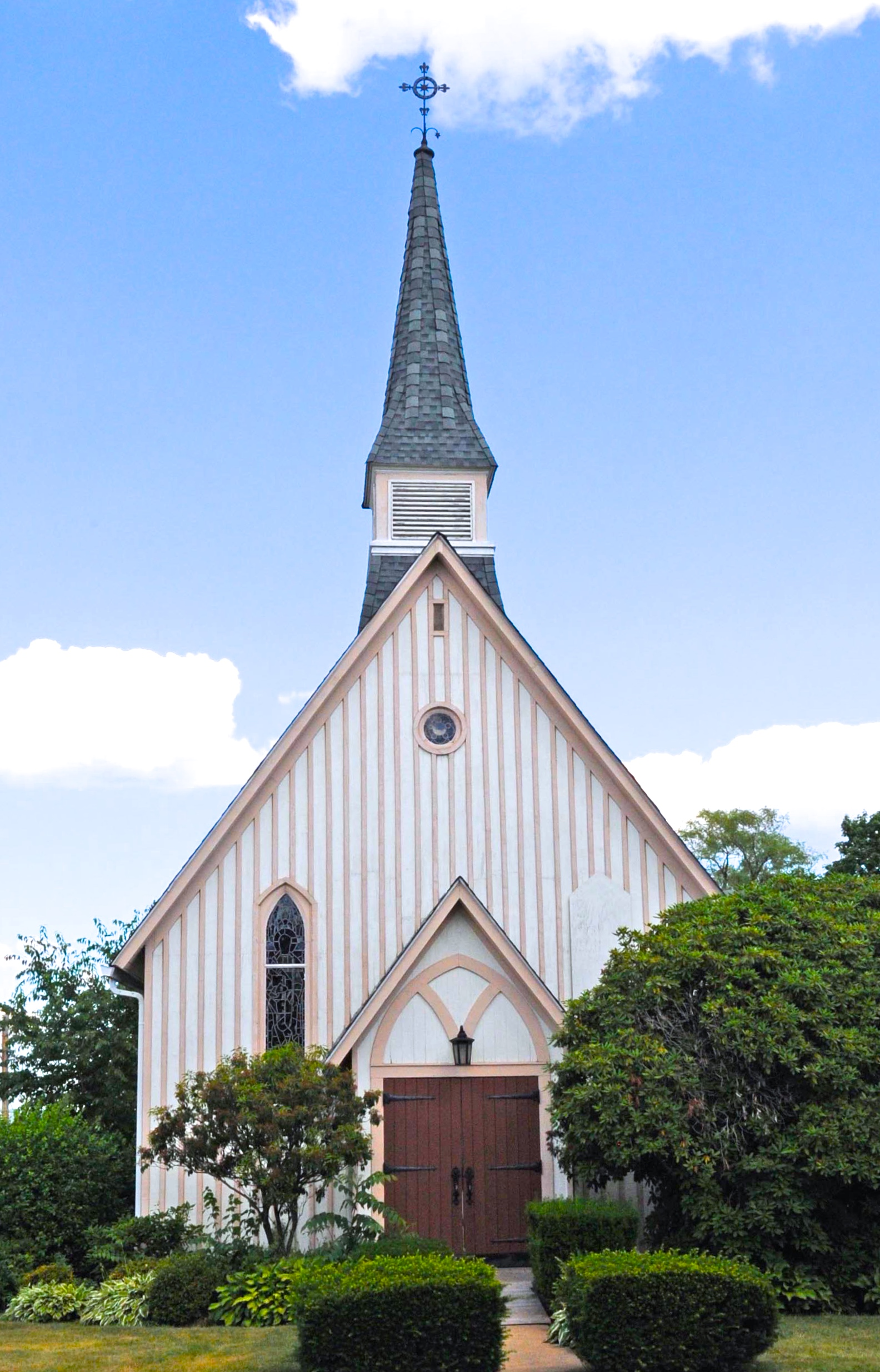
Saint Paul's Episcopal Church

- Finkelstein Memorial Library – 24 Chestnut Street – Built in 1940. Books, maps and news-clipping files on Rockland County history and local newsworthy events.
- Holocaust Museum & Study Center – 17 South Madison Avenue – Permanent exhibit combines graphics, montages, artifacts, and audiovisual displays to detail every phase of the Holocaust. Changing art exhibits.
- St. Paul's Episcopal Church – 26 South Madison Ave – The church was added to the National Register of Historic Places in 2008. The first service took place in 1868, four years before the first service in the new church was held December 18, 1873. (NRHP)
- Spring Valley's Columbian Fire Engine Co. No. 1 celebrated its 150th anniversary with a county fire parade on September 10, 2011.
- Spring Valley (Metro-North station) – Municipal Plaza, 1 North Main Street
- Spring Valley High School – Route 59.
- U.S. Post Office – North Madison Avenue (NRHP)
- Spring Valley Memorial Park - Memorial Park Dr - Large park in the middle of Spring Valley that contains a pool, tennis court, football/soccer field, and basketball courts.

== Education ==
The Roman Catholic Archdiocese of New York operates Catholic schools in Rockland County. St. Joseph Parish School in Spring Valley closed in 2005.

East Ramapo Central School District (ERCSD) serves Spring Valley. Two High Schools within the ERCSD include Ramapo High School and Spring Valley High School It also includes Kakiat STEAM Academy (4-8)

== Voting Districts ==
In compliance with the Federal Court order, Case 7:17-cv-08943-CS-JCM, the District was divided into 9 Wards.

The Ward voting poll site locations are:

- Ward 1 - Summit Park Elementary School, 911 Route 45, New City, NY 10956
- Ward 2 - Pascack Community Center, 87 New Clarkstown Road, Nanuet, NY 10954
- Ward 3 - Spring Valley High School - Upper Gym, 361 Route 59, Spring Valley, NY 10977
- Ward 4 - Chestnut Ridge Middle School, 892 Route 45, Chestnut Ridge, NY, 10977
- Ward 5 - Yeshiva Viznitz, 229 Maple Avenue, Monsey, NY, 10952
- Ward 6 - Elmwood Elementary School, 43 Robert Pitt Drive, Monsey, NY 10952
- Ward 7 - Ramapo High School, 400 Viola Road, Spring Valley, NY 10977
- Ward 8 - Pomona Middle School, 101 Pomona Road, Suffern, NY 10901
- Ward 9 - Lime Kiln Elementary School, 35 Lime Kiln Road, Suffern, NY 10901

== Notable people ==
- Phil Bogle, football player
- Keith Bulluck, former NFL linebacker
- Junior Galette, NFL linebacker
- Lucy Grealy, author
- Mondaire Jones, politician
- Seth Joyner, former NFL linebacker
- Julianna Margulies, actress
- Bishop Nehru, rapper
- Gerald S. O'Loughlin, actor
- Murray Olderman, sports cartoonist
- Jermaine Paul, singer on NBC's The Voice
- Doc Powell, musician
- Samuel Reshevsky, chess grandmaster
- Saigon, rapper
- Rob Senderoff, college basketball coach
- Matt Siegel, radio personality
- Leander Tomarkin, imposter
- Beri Weber, musician
- David Zaslav, CEO Discovery Communications
- Nana Kwame Adjei-Brenyah, author
