= The Patron Saint of Liars (novel) =

1992 novel by Ann Patchett

- Author: Ann Patchett
- Language: English
- Publisher: Houghton Mifflin Harcourt
- Publication date: 1992
- Publication place: United States
- Pages: 392
- ISBN: 978-0-547-52020-9

The Patron Saint of Liars is a 1992 novel, written by Ann Patchett. This is the first novel published by Patchett, and it was selected as a New York Times Notable Book of the Year. Patchett completed the manuscript for The Patron Saint of Liars during a fellowship at the Fine Arts Work Center in Provincetown, Massachusetts. The novel focuses on a young woman named Rose who abandons her life in California as a married woman. She leaves for Kentucky and takes residence at a home for unwed mothers that is owned by the Catholic Church. As she watches girls give birth and disappear from the home, she must think of her own plans and what the future has in store for her.

== Plot ==
The book is divided into four sections: Habit, Rose, Son, and Sissy

=== Habit ===
In 1906, George Clatterbuck witnesses a miracle as his daughter, June Clatterbuck, is healed by water from a spring in the back pasture of their property. The healing qualities of the spring attract visitors from afar including the Nelsons, wealthy horse breeders from Lexington. Upon discovering that there wasn’t a hotel in Habit, Lewis Nelson commissioned a hotel to be built to create space for all the visitors seeking out aid from the spring. The hotel was opened in 1920 as Hotel Louisa in honor of Lewis’ wife, Louisa Nelson. When the spring dried up and the stock market crashed in 1929, the hotel was given to the Catholic church and renamed Saint Elizabeth’s. It was shortly used as a home for nuns to live out their days. Later, the nuns were moved to Ohio and the Hotel Louisa remained empty for some time before it became a Roman Catholic home for unwed mothers.

=== Rose ===
It is 1968, and Rose Clinton finds herself in a bind as she is pregnant with her husband's child, and she has no desire to keep the baby. Unhappy with her life, she seeks out Father O'Donnell and learns of a place called Saint Elizabeth's in Habit, Kentucky. It is a home for unwed mothers, but Rose begs Father O'Donnell to assist her. She sets out from California on Highway 40, making several stops along the way. Rose arrives at Saint Elizabeth's and finds herself living with a girl named Angela. Thinking about her mother and husband often, Rose tries to fit in and quickly learns the routine of Saint Elizabeth's, taking a job in the kitchen with Sister Evangeline. Sister Evangeline grows fond of Rose, keeping her in the kitchen frequently to assist her. She often attempts to tell Rose what she knows about her future, but Rose tends to brush her insight to the side. As the months pass, Rose starts to grow to the idea of being a mother, especially as Beatrice asks for her assistance in delivering her twin boys. After an exhausting night delivering Beatrice's babies, Rose wanders off outside in the snow. Son finds her, and carries her back to his home. Rose finally admits that she wants to keep her daughter and Son suggests that she marry him and live at Saint Elizabeth's with him. She agrees quickly and begs to be married that night. Following their ceremony, Rose and Son share their news with Angela and Sister Evangeline, while attempting to build a foundation for their marriage with little knowledge of each other.

=== Son ===
Now married and adjusting to life as a new father, Son thinks a lot about his life prior to Rose and Sissy. He reflects on his time as a teenager, starting with his roller coaster romance with a girl named Cecelia, enlisting in the Marine Corps, and having to leave abruptly. Throughout his story, he reflects on memories of Sissy growing up, developing her personality and the transformation of her relationship with both himself and Rose.

=== Sissy ===
Now fifteen years old, Sissy has adapted to the lack of emotional connection with her mother, Rose. Although she has grown up without a strong bond with Rose, she doesn't stop herself from trying to have a relationship with her mother, as she asks Rose to teach her how to drive. Once she knows the key to her mother's heart, nothing will keep Sissy from rekindling the friendship and love she had for her mother.

== Main characters ==
- Martha Rose Clinton is the mother of Cecilia Abbott. She was previously married to Thomas Clinton, prior to leaving California and marrying Wilson Abbott upon her decision to raise her daughter.
- Mother Corinne is the head nun at Saint Elizabeth’s. She is regarded as somewhat strict and mean by most of the unwed mothers.
- Sister Evangeline is one of the nuns at Saint Elizabeth's. Her primary role is cooking for the women. Prior to being the cook, she was the head nun at Saint Elizabeth's, up until the time that Mother Corinne took over.
- Wilson "Son" Abbott is the groundskeeper/maintenance man at Saint Elizabeth’s. He marries Rose, and takes on the role of Cecilia's father.
- June Clatterbuck is the owner of the property of Saint Elizabeth's. She becomes good friends with Rose and becomes more involved with Saint Elizabeth's.
- Cecilia "Sissy" Helen Abbott is Rose’s daughter. Her father, according to her birth certificate, is Son. Her biological father is Thomas Clinton.

== Reception ==
Many reviews have praised Patchett for her first novel. Annabel Davis-Goff, for Entertainment Weekly, wrote, "...this is a wonderful novel. Patchett writes with a simplicity of style and clarity of voice that make one eager for her next book." Gerald Costello, for U.S. Catholic, wrote, "One often hears of talented new writers that they show great promise.... For Ann Patchett, the promise has already been fulfilled; with The Patron Saint of Liars, she has arrived." Alice McDermott, of the New York Times Book Review, said, "Ann Patchett has written such a good first novel that among the many pleasures it offers is the anticipation of how wonderful her second, third, and fourth will surely be.... It is a world that Ms. Patchett draws with wit and imagination.... It is about pilgrimage and healing. A made-up story of an enchanted place. A fairy tale. A delight."

== Adaptation ==
In 1998, The Patron Saint of Liars was adapted as a television film, for CBS.
