= Bel Canto (novel) =

2001 novel by Ann Patchett

- Cover of the first edition (2001)
- Author: Ann Patchett
- Cover artist: Elizabeth Ackerman; Echos/Nonstock
- Language: English
- Genre: Thriller novel
- Publisher: Perennial, HarperCollins
- Publication date: 2001
- Publication place: United States
- Media type: Print (Paperback, Hardback); Audiobook (Cassette, CD)
- Pages: 318 (Paperback)
- ISBN: 0-06-093441-7
- OCLC: 51300210

Bel Canto is the fourth novel by American author Ann Patchett, published in 2001 by Perennial, an imprint of HarperCollins Publishers. It was awarded both the Orange Prize for Fiction and PEN/Faulkner Award for Fiction. It was placed on several top book lists, including Amazon's Best Books of the Year (2001). It was also adapted into an opera in 2015.

Based on the Japanese embassy hostage crisis (also called the Lima Crisis) of 1996–1997 in Lima, Peru, the novel follows the relationships among a group of young terrorists and their hostages, who are mostly high-profile executives and politicians, over several months. Many of the characters form unbreakable bonds of friendship, while some fall in love.

Opera is a centralizing theme on many levels throughout the story; the operatic term bel canto literally means "beautiful singing."

== Plot summary ==
Set in an unspecified South American country, the story begins at a birthday party thrown at the country's vice presidential home in honor of Katsumi Hosokawa, the visiting chairman of a large Japanese company and opera enthusiast. As a not-so-subtle pretext to get Hosokawa to invest in the country, famous American soprano Roxane Coss is scheduled to perform as the highlight of the party.

Near the end of the party, members of a terrorist organization break into the house, intending to take the President of the country hostage. When they realize the President is not in attendance, the terrorist group decides to take the entire party hostage. After determining they have too many hostages, the terrorists decide to release all of the hostages except those they deem most likely to return a large ransom.

Two major romantic relationships develop as the standoff drags on and serve as the backdrop to the rest of the story. The first is between Coss and Hosokawa, who develop a deep bond even though they do not speak each other's language and thus cannot communicate verbally. The second relationship is between the translator Gen and the young terrorist Carmen, who must keep their love a secret. The two lovers meet in the china closet every night.

At the end of the novel, the government breaks into the house and kills all the terrorists. All of the hostages are freed except for Hosokawa, who is shot by government forces as he attempts to shield Carmen.

In an epilogue that takes place some years later, former hostages Simon Thibault and his wife meet with Gen and Roxane, who are getting married in Italy.

== Characters ==
Katsumi Hosokawa is a Japanese business mogul, who is married with two daughters. He has a strong bond with his young translator Gen. He doesn't speak Spanish and must use Gen for all communication in the host country. Since attending a performance with his father as a child, opera has been his greatest love, and he is passionate about the soprano Roxane Coss, having heard her recordings. He falls in love with the woman herself during their time together. However, he knows their relationship can only last for the duration of the standoff. He is gunned down in the final scenes by the soldiers of the host country, in his attempt to save the teenaged terrorist Carmen.

Roxane Coss is an internationally renowned American soprano. At first a prima donna who sets herself apart from the rest of the guests, she eventually begins to bond with the others when she receives a box of musical scores and begins singing to them every morning. She is especially touched by her relationships with Mr. Hosokawa, with whom she falls in love; Gen, with whom she forms a strong bond and eventually marries; Carmen, who sleeps in her bed, braids her hair, and comforts her; and Cesar, another young terrorist with a gifted singing voice whom she begins tutoring.

Gen Watanabe is Mr. Hosokawa's translator and assistant. He is a quiet, sensitive and gifted young man who speaks several languages. As the translator, he is usually at the center of the action of the novel, although he is the only hostage, besides a priest, who is not fabulously wealthy and powerful. He begins tutoring Carmen when she asks him to teach her how to read and write in Spanish and English, and they begin meeting each night in the china closet to study and eventually make love.

General Benjamin is the most intelligent and thoughtful of the three generals who lead the terrorists. Benjamin was a schoolteacher until his brother was arrested and imprisoned for handing out flyers publicizing a political protest. After that, he joined the terrorist group La Familia de Martin Suarez, named after a ten-year-old boy who was shot dead while handing out flyers for a political rally. Benjamin has left behind a wife and children, and he is fatherly to some of the young terrorists under his command. He is plagued with shingles, which rage across much of his face.

Joachim Messner is a Swiss representative for the Red Cross. who negotiates between the government and the terrorists. He is the one person allowed to come and go from the mansion. Messner punctuates the general happiness with frequent reminders that the situation will end badly.

Carmen is the terrorist whom Gen loves. Carmen remains incognito in the guise of a male terrorist for the first part of the novel. The leader of the organization, General Benjamin, notices what a beautiful young woman she has become and notes that, "had she been this pretty before, he never would have let her sign up." She often prays to Saint Rose of Lima. In the ultimate shootout, she is gunned down before Gen can get to her. In the ensuing newspaper articles, there is no record of her ever existing.

Simon Thibault is the French ambassador to the South American country where the novel is set. Because he longs for his wife Edith, who is released early with the rest of the women and children, Thibault is the hostage who is most unhappy during the long standoff. He spends much of his time cooking for both the hostages and the terrorists, and he is almost always wearing Edith's scarf. He and Edith are reunited after the standoff, and they are the witnesses to the marriage of Gen and Roxane in the final chapter.

== Creative process ==
Patchett was inspired by the Lima Crisis as she watched the events unfold on the news and thought how operatic the crisis was. Patchett was an opera novice prior to writing the book, although she has stated that the character Roxane was modeled on Karol Bennett, an acquaintance of hers who was an opera singer. Since she was not familiar with Bennett's voice, she listened to recordings by the famous American soprano Renée Fleming and imagined Roxane Coss as possessing Fleming's voice. (Patchett and Fleming became friends only after the novel was published.)

The original working title was How to Fall in Love with Opera, but her editor advised against it in case bookstores would mis-shelve it in their "how to" section. The manuscript originally contained a prologue from Gen's perspective, establishing the book as a story about how he met his wife. However, Patchett's mentor Elizabeth McCracken told her that the prologue was not needed, so Patchett cut it.

Patchett has stated that she always wanted to write with an omniscient third person narrator that "moves from person to person within a room"—a style she calls "Anna Karenina-third." Her first two novels were in first-person and her third novel was in third-person, but it was limited to one character's perspective. She was pleased when she was able to write in this style for Bel Canto, deeming her achievement of the style a progression in her writing.

== Reception ==
Sue MacGregor, the broadcaster and chairman of the Orange Prize judges, praised the work, saying, "This is a fine piece of writing, mixing tenderness and danger to an impressive degree." Critic Alex Clark praised the wide range of Patchett's writing, which "encompass[es] both lightning flashes of brutality and terror and long stretches of incarcerated ennui." Several reviews note a departure in style from Patchett's earlier works and credit Bel Canto for pushing her into the national spotlight.

Critic James Polk largely praised the novel, but noted Patchett "strained a bit too hard" to highlight the terrorists' humanizing traits, which he argued "diminished the story's taut ambivalence, making some scenes near the end sound almost like accounts of a Boy Scout jamboree." Other reviewers also criticize the slow pacing and unrealistic characterizations, although other critics attribute this to Patchett's brand of magic realism.

Bel Canto has been translated into over 30 languages. According to Patchett, it was slated to become a movie five or six times, a Broadway musical, and an opera by Aaron Jay Kernis, commissioned for the Santa Fe Opera's 2006 season, all of which fell through, until the opera came together in 2015 and the film in 2018.

== Adaptations ==
The novel has been adapted under the same title into an opera by composer Jimmy López to a libretto by Nilo Cruz. It premiered at the Lyric Opera of Chicago on December 7, 2015.

A film adaptation of the same name from director Paul Weitz with Julianne Moore and Ken Watanabe was released in 2018.

The television series Archer parodied Bel Canto during its seventh season with a two-episode arc called "Bel Panto": the visitors of a charity event are taken hostage by a group of clowns seeking to steal a jeweled necklace from a wealthy actress.
