= Philadelphia Eagles all-time roster (A–Ke) =

1,875 players have appeared in at least one regular season or postseason game in the National Football League (NFL) for the Philadelphia Eagles franchise since 1933. This list includes those whose last names fall between "A" and "Ke". For the rest of the players, see Philadelphia Eagles all-time roster (Kh–Z). This list is accurate through the end of the 2025 NFL season.

== A ==
- Walter Abercrombie
- Victor Abiamiri
- Dick Absher
- Emmanuel Acho
- Jamar Adams
- Josh Adams
- Keith Adams
- Cal Adomitis
- Ben Agajanian
- Nelson Agholor
- Kamar Aiken
- Jay Ajayi
- Seyi Ajirotutu
- David Akers
- D. J. Alexander
- David Alexander
- Kermit Alexander
- Beau Allen
- Chuck Allen
- Devon Allen
- Eric Allen
- Ian Allen
- Jackie Allen
- Kevin Allen
- Nate Allen
- Ty Allert
- Hank Allison
- Kiko Alonso
- Glen Amerson
- George Amundson
- Colt Anderson
- Gary Anderson
- Jack Anderson
- Josh Andrews
- Shawn Andrews
- Stacy Andrews
- Jim Angelo
- Houston Antwine
- J. J. Arcega-Whiteside
- Justin Armour
- Harvey Armstrong
- Neill Armstrong
- Grayland Arnold
- Jay Arnold
- Rick Arrington
- Darrel Aschbacher
- Nnamdi Asomugha
- Steve Atkins
- Howie Auer
- Jim Auer
- Miles Austin
- Darnell Autry
- Jason Avant
- Genard Avery
- Kayode Awosika
- Marvin Ayers

== B ==
- Jason Babin
- Joe Bachie
- Matt Bahr
- David Bailey
- Eric Bailey
- Howard Bailey
- Tom Bailey
- Victor Bailey
- Brandon Bair
- Al Baisi
- Jason Baker
- John Baker
- Keith Baker
- Ron Baker
- Sam Baker
- Tony Baker
- Brian Baldinger
- Gary Ballman
- Steve Banas
- Bruno Banducci
- Jack Banta
- Shawn Barber
- Allen Barbre
- Bryan Barker
- Matt Barkley
- Saquon Barkley
- Corey Barlow
- Kenjon Barner
- Antwan Barnes
- Billy Ray Barnes
- Larry Barnes
- Walt Barnes
- Derek Barnett
- Fred Barnett
- Dan Barnhart
- Roy Barni
- Len Barnum
- Sam Bartholomew
- Doug Bartlett
- Ephesians Bartley
- Mike Bartrum
- Connor Barwin
- Nick Basca
- Hank Baskett
- Dick Bassi
- Reds Bassman
- Matt Battaglia
- Maxie Baughan
- Alf Bauman
- Zack Baun
- De'Vante Bausby
- Frank Bausch
- Mark Bavaro
- Bibbles Bawel
- Winnie Baze
- Pat Beach
- Shawn Beals
- William Beatty
- Jim Beaver
- Ian Beckles
- Mekhi Becton
- Chuck Bednarik
- Randy Beisler
- Demetress Bell
- Eddie Bell
- Joique Bell
- Mike Bell
- Todd Bell
- Mike Bellamy
- Vic Bellamy
- B. J. Bello
- Jesse Bendross
- Jakorian Bennett
- Michael Bennett
- Harry Benson
- Mitch Berger
- Bill Bergey
- Will Berzinski
- James Betterson
- Dick Bielski
- Eric Bieniemy
- E. J. Biggers
- Tank Bigsby
- John Binotto
- Blaine Bishop
- Bob Bjorklund
- Mike Black
- Richard Blackmore
- Ed Blaine
- Jeff Blake
- Reed Blankenship
- Khari Blasingame
- Jeff Bleamer
- Mel Bleeker
- LeGarrette Blount
- Luther Blue
- Ron Blye
- Harry Boatswain
- Bill Boedeker
- Gary Bolden
- Chris Boniol
- Lorenzo Booker
- Thomas Booker
- John Booty
- Mike Boryla
- James Bostic
- Jason Bostic
- Lee Bouggess
- Tony Bova
- Kevin Bowman
- Brandon Boykin
- Deral Boykin
- James Bradberry
- Sam Bradford
- Nigel Bradham
- Bill Bradley
- Carlos Bradley
- Harold Bradley, Jr.
- Shaun Bradley
- Stewart Bradley
- Bryan Braman
- John Bredice
- Leo Brennan
- Jack Brewer
- John Brewer
- Bill Brian
- Bubby Brister
- Rankin Britt
- Barrett Brooks
- Brandon Brooks
- Clifford Brooks
- Ron Brooks
- Terrence Brooks
- Tony Brooks
- Tom Brookshier
- Luther Broughton
- Aaron Brown
- A. J. Brown
- Bob Brown
- Bryce Brown
- Cedrick Brown
- Dave Brown
- DeAuntae Brown
- Fred Brown
- Greg Brown
- Jamon Brown
- Jerome Brown
- Na Brown
- Reggie Brown (born 1960)
- Reggie Brown (born 1981)
- Ronnie Brown
- Sheldon Brown
- Sydney Brown
- Thomas Brown
- Timmy Brown
- Willie Brown
- Zach Brown
- Don Brumm
- Daryon Brutley
- Bill Bryant
- Doug Brzezinski
- Correll Buckhalter
- Eldra Buckley
- Frank Budd
- Joe Bukant
- Norm Bulaich
- Ronnie Bull
- Brodrick Bunkley
- John Bunting
- Derrick Burgess
- Adrian Burk
- Mark Burke
- Oren Burks
- Deontay Burnett
- Tom Burnette
- Lem Burnham
- Hank Burnine
- Don Burroughs
- Trey Burton
- Thomas Bushby
- Art Buss
- Bob Butler
- Hakeem Butler
- Johnny Butler
- Kevin Byard
- Keith Byars
- Bill Byrne

== C ==
- Larry Cabrelli
- Lee Roy Caffey
- Jim Cagle
- Dave Cahill
- Grant Calcaterra
- Mike Caldwell
- Don Calhoun
- Lonny Calicchio
- Ernie Calloway
- Jorrick Calvin
- Glenn Campbell
- Jihaad Campbell
- Marion Campbell
- Parris Campbell
- Stan Campbell
- Tommy Campbell
- Billy Campfield
- T.J. Campion
- Rocco Canale
- Harold Carmichael
- Roc Carmichael
- Joe Carollo
- Joe Carpe
- Rob Carpenter
- Earl Carr
- Jimmy Carr
- Russ Carroccio
- Nolan Carroll
- Carlos Carson
- Cris Carter
- DeAndre Carter
- Jalen Carter
- Joe Carter
- Michael Carter II
- Pete Case
- James Casey
- Howard Cassady
- Jim Castiglia
- Thomas Caterbone
- Tom Catlin
- Matt Cavanaugh
- Quinton Caver
- Brent Celek
- Tony Cemore
- Gene Ceppetelli
- Andre Chachere
- Mike Chalenski
- Jamar Chaney
- Dick Chapura
- Louis Cheek
- Je'Rod Cherry
- Chuck Cherundolo
- Al Chesley
- Wes Chesson
- Patrick Chung
- Don Chuy
- Gus Cifelli
- Al Clark
- Algy Clark
- Jeremy Clark
- Le'Raven Clark
- Mike Clark
- Willie Clark
- Adrien Clarke
- Ken Clarke
- Keenan Clayton
- Corey Clement
- Chris Clemons
- Topper Clemons
- Garry Cobb
- Bill Cody
- Steve Colavito
- John Cole
- Nick Cole
- Trent Cole
- Al Coleman
- Kurt Coleman
- Marco Coleman
- Bruce Collie
- Wayne Colman
- Bill Combs
- Jack Concannon
- Larry Conjar
- Ray Conlin
- Darion Conner
- Sean Considine
- Enio Conti
- Joe Conwell
- Leon Cook
- Rashard Cook
- Ed Cooke
- Darius Cooper
- Evan Cooper
- Louis Cooper
- Richard Cooper
- Riley Cooper
- Russell Copeland
- Frank Cornish
- José Cortéz
- Zed Coston
- Paige Cothren
- Blake Countess
- Jerome Couplin III
- Britain Covey
- Bill Cowher
- Gerard Cowhig
- Fletcher Cox
- Claude Crabb
- Russ Craft
- Jerry Crafts
- Charles Crawford
- Bob Creech
- Smiley Creswell
- Bill Cronin
- Jason Croom
- Irv Cross
- Larry Crowe
- Darrel Crutchfield
- Paul Cuba
- Jim Culbreath
- Willie Cullars
- George Cumby
- B. J. Cunningham
- Dick Cunningham
- Randall Cunningham
- Zach Cunningham
- Bree Cuppoletti
- Mike Curcio
- Vinny Curry
- Kevin Curtis
- Scott Curtis
- Johnathan Cyprien

== D ==
- Frank D'Agostino
- Chase Daniel
- Torrance Daniels
- Byron Darby
- Ronald Darby
- Trey Darilek
- James Darling
- Matt Darwin
- Antone Davis
- Bob Davis
- Jordan Davis
- Norman Davis
- Pernell Davis
- Red Davis
- Robert Davis
- Sonny Davis
- Stan Davis
- Vern Davis
- Tyrion Davis-Price
- Brian Dawkins
- Dale Dawson
- Nakobe Dean
- Ted Dean
- Cooper DeJean
- Steve DeLine
- Jeff Dellenbach
- Jerry DeLucca
- Quintin Demps
- Jack Dempsey
- Tom Dempsey
- Mark Dennard
- Richard Dent
- Dan DeSantis
- Koy Detmer
- Ty Detmer
- Kyle DeVan
- Dennis DeVaughn
- Alan Dial
- Benjy Dial
- David Diaz-Infante
- Cameron Dicker
- Kori Dickerson
- Landon Dickerson
- Dave diFilippo
- Andre Dillard
- A. J. Dillon
- Tom Dimmick
- Charles Dimry
- Nate Dingle
- Mike Dirks
- Mike Ditka
- Al Dixon
- Antonio Dixon
- Floyd Dixon
- Ronnie Dixon
- Zachary Dixon
- Herb Dobbins
- Jon Dorenbos
- Al Dorow
- Dean Dorsey
- Noble Doss
- Jahan Dotson
- Dameane Douglas
- Hugh Douglas
- Merrill Douglas
- Otis Douglas
- Rasul Douglas
- Woody Dow
- Harry Dowda
- Ted Doyle
- Joe Drake
- Troy Drake
- Jack Driscoll
- Robert Drummond
- Bobby Duckworth
- Paul Dudley
- Jon Dumbauld
- Rick Duncan
- Ken Dunek
- King Dunlap
- Jason Dunn
- Bill Dunstan
- John Durko

== E ==
- Kyle Eckel
- Terrell Edmunds
- Anthony Edwards
- Herm Edwards
- T. J. Edwards
- Trent Edwards
- Tom Ehlers
- John Eibner
- Mohammed Elewonibi
- Dannell Ellerbe
- Jake Elliott
- Alex Ellis
- Drew Ellis
- Ray Ellis
- Christian Elliss
- Swede Ellstrom
- Trae Elston
- Charles Emanuel
- Pete Emelianchik
- Carlos Emmons
- Frank Emmons
- Justin Ena
- Rick Engles
- Fred Enke
- Alonzo Ephraim
- Marcus Epps
- Dick Erdlitz
- Zach Ertz
- Larry Estes
- Byron Evans
- Donald Evans
- Justin Evans
- Mike Evans
- Randall Evans
- Eric Everett
- Major Everett
- Steve Everitt

== F ==
- Carl Fagioli
- Ray Farmer
- Ken Farragut
- Ron Fazio
- Jeff Feagles
- Gerry Feehery
- A. J. Feeley
- Bernie Feibish
- Nip Felber
- Happy Feller
- Dick Fencl
- Fritz Ferko
- Jack Ferrante
- Neil Ferris
- Bill Fiedler
- Jay Fiedler
- Brian Finneran
- Mickey Fitzgerald
- Scott Fitzkee
- Jim Flanigan
- Bradley Fletcher
- Mike Flores
- Eric Floyd
- DeShawn Fogle
- Moise Fokou
- Nick Foles
- Steve Folsom
- Chris Fontenot
- Charlie Ford
- Rudy Ford
- L. J. Fort
- Elbert Foules
- Dustin Fox
- Terry Fox
- Dick Frahm
- Hank Fraley
- Todd France
- Joe Frank
- Cleveland Franklin
- Tony Franklin
- Dennis Franks
- Derrick Frazier
- Antonio Freeman
- Bobby Freeman
- Glenn Frey
- Bob Friedlund
- Bob Friedman
- George Fritts
- Ralph Fritz
- Jim Fritzsche
- William Frizzell
- Irving Fryar
- Travis Fulgham
- Frank Fuller
- James Fuller
- William Fuller

== G ==
- Roman Gabriel
- Kenneth Gainwell
- Omar Gaither
- Bob Gambold
- Dallas Gant
- Bob Gaona
- Jeff Garcia
- Andrew Gardner
- Barry Gardner
- C. J. Gardner-Johnson
- Charlie Garner
- Mekhi Garner
- Gregg Garrity
- Russell Gary
- Michael Gasperson
- Nick Gates
- Charlie Gauer
- Blenda Gay
- Clifton Geathers
- Ed George
- Ray George
- Woody Gerber
- Chris Gerhard
- Tom Gerhart
- Nathan Gerry
- Carl Gersbach
- Lou Ghecas
- Louie Giammona
- Hal Giancanelli
- Mario Giannelli
- Pat Gibbs
- Abe Gibron
- Brandon Gibson
- Shelton Gibson
- Frank Giddens
- Wimpy Giddens
- Lewis Gilbert
- Jimmie Giles
- Roger Gill
- Jim Gilmore
- Mardy Gilyard
- Jerry Ginney
- Xavier Gipson
- Glenn Glass
- Fred Gloden
- Rich Glover
- Chris Gocong
- Brad Goebel
- Dallas Goedert
- Tim Golden
- Ralph Goldston
- Mike Golic
- Rudy Gollomb
- Bob Gonya
- John Goode
- Najee Goode
- Rob Goode
- Mario Goodrich
- Ron Goodwin
- Dillon Gordon
- Lamar Gordon
- Chuck Gorecki
- Gene Gossage
- Kurt Gouveia
- Tay Gowan
- Brandon Graham
- Corey Graham
- Dave Graham
- Jeff Graham
- Lyle Graham
- Nick Graham
- Tom Graham
- Kylen Granson
- Bud Grant
- Otis Grant
- Paul Grasmanis
- Ray Graves
- Cecil Gray
- Jim Gray
- Mel Gray
- Donnie Green
- Jamaal Green
- John Green
- Roy Green
- Dorial Green-Beckham
- Kelly Gregg
- Ken Gregory
- Don Griffin
- Jeff Griffin
- Anthony Griggs
- Elois Grooms
- Earl Gros
- Burt Grossman
- Kamu Grugier-Hill
- Aaron Grymes
- Len Gudd
- Henry Gude
- Ralph Guglielmi
- Tony Guillory
- Mark Gunn
- Riley Gunnels

== H ==
- Elmer Hackney
- Michael Haddix
- Nick Haden
- Britt Hager
- Carl Hairston
- Chuck Hajek
- Chad Hall
- Daeshon Hall
- Deiondre' Hall
- Gabe Hall
- Irv Hall
- Rhett Hall
- Ron Hallstrom
- Bill Halverson
- Dean Halverson
- Justin Hamilton
- Skip Hamilton
- Uhuru Hamiter
- Dave Hampton
- William Hampton
- Karl Hankton
- Roscoe Hansen
- Homer Hanson
- Joselio Hanson
- Swede Hanson
- Clay Harbor
- Greg Harding
- Roger Harding
- Andre Hardy
- Javon Hargrave
- Marvin Hargrove
- Andy Harmon
- Maurice Harper
- Perry Harrington
- Al Harris (born 1956)
- Al Harris (born 1974)
- Anthony Harris
- Charles Harris
- Jimmy Harris
- Jon Harris
- Leroy Harris
- Macho Harris
- Richard Harris
- Rod Harris
- Tim Harris
- Bob Harrison
- Dennis Harrison
- Gran Harrison
- Jerome Harrison
- Tyreo Harrison
- Clinton Hart
- Dick Hart
- Taylor Hart
- Fred Hartman
- Richard Harvey
- Tim Hasselbeck
- Tim Hauck
- Stanley Havili
- Ben Hawkins
- Josh Hawkins
- Aaron Hayden
- Ken Hayden
- Ed Hayes
- Joe Hayes
- Alvin Haymond
- Jo Jo Heath
- Vaughn Hebron
- Ralph Heck
- Bruce Hector
- George Hegamin
- Ron Heller
- Jerome Henderson
- Zac Henderson
- Steve Hendrickson
- Alex Henery
- Chas Henry
- Maurice Henry
- Wally Henry
- Gary Henson
- Nate Herbig
- Todd Herremans
- Jeff Herrod
- Kirk Hershey
- Treyvon Hester
- Bill Hewitt
- Artis Hicks
- Jordan Hicks
- Tom Higgins
- Mark Higgs
- John Hightower
- Fred Hill
- King Hill
- Jack Hinkle
- Billy Hix
- Terry Hoage
- Bill Hobbs
- Ellis Hobbs
- Reggie Hodges
- Mike Hogan
- Tex Holcomb
- Mack Hollins
- Lester Holmes
- Elijah Holyfield
- Roderick Hood
- Alvin Hooks
- Melvin Hoover
- Wes Hopkins
- Mike Horan
- Roy Hord, Jr.
- Marty Horn
- Bill Horrell
- Clark Hoss
- Jameson Houston
- Austin Howard
- Bob Howard
- Darren Howard
- Jordan Howard
- Lane Howell
- Lynn Hoyem
- Bobby Hoying
- Frank Hrabetin
- John Huarte
- Bob Hudson
- John Hudson
- Bryce Huff
- Josh Huff
- Albert Huggins
- Bill Hughes
- Brandon Hughes
- Chuck Hughes
- Charley Hughlett
- Don Hultz
- Dick Humbert
- Claude Humphrey
- Calvin Hunt
- Jalyx Hunt
- Phillip Hunt
- Tony Hunt
- Herman Hunter
- Jason Huntley
- Jalen Hurts
- Gerry Huth
- Tom Hutton
- Ken Huxhold
- John Huzvar

== I ==
- Emil Igwenagu
- Jack Ikegwuonu
- Mark Ingram Sr.
- Willie Irvin

== J ==
- Adoree' Jackson
- Al Jackson
- Alonzo Jackson
- Bobby Jackson
- DeSean Jackson
- Don Jackson
- Earnest Jackson
- Greg Jackson
- Harold Jackson
- Jamaal Jackson
- Johnny Jackson
- Keith Jackson
- Kenny Jackson
- Malik Jackson
- Randy Jackson
- T. J. Jackson
- Tarron Jackson
- Tyree Jackson
- Dave Jacobs
- Proverb Jacobs
- Michael Jacquet
- Angelo James
- Craig James
- Po James
- Ernie Janet
- Mike Jarmoluk
- Jaiquawn Jarrett
- Toimi Jarvi
- Ed Jasper
- Ron Jaworski
- Max Jean-Gilles
- Billy Jefferson
- Greg Jefferson
- Alshon Jeffery
- Tom Jelesky
- Dietrich Jells
- Cullen Jenkins
- E. J. Jenkins
- Izel Jenkins
- Malcolm Jenkins
- Timmy Jernigan
- Tommy Jeter
- Dwayne Jiles
- Josh Jobe
- Ove Johansson
- Al Johnson
- Alonzo Johnson
- Bert Johnson
- Bill Johnson
- Brandon Johnson
- Charles Johnson
- Charlie Johnson
- Chris Johnson
- Damaris Johnson
- Dirk Johnson
- Don Johnson
- Dwight Johnson
- Eric Johnson
- Fred Johnson
- Gene Johnson
- Jay Johnson
- Jimmie Johnson
- Keelan Johnson
- KeeSean Johnson
- Kevin Johnson
- Kyron Johnson
- Lane Johnson
- Lee Johnson
- Lorne Johnson
- Marcus Johnson
- Maurice Johnson
- Norm Johnson
- Patrick Johnson
- Reggie Johnson
- Ron Johnson (born 1958)
- Ron Johnson (born 1979)
- Vaughan Johnson
- Cameron Johnston
- Don Jonas
- Brad Jones
- Chris Jones
- Dhani Jones
- Donnie Jones
- Harry Jones
- Jimmie Jones
- Joe Jones
- Julian Jones
- Julio Jones
- Ray Jones
- Sean Jones
- Sidney Jones
- Spike Jones
- Tyrone Jones
- Akeem Jordan
- Andrew Jordan
- Carl Jorgensen
- James Joseph
- Linval Joseph
- Seth Joyner
- Cam Jurgens
- Sonny Jurgensen
- Luke Juriga
- Winston Justice

== Ka-Ke ==
- Vyto Kab
- Mike Kafka
- N. D. Kalu
- Carl Kane
- John Kapele
- Bernie Kaplan
- Abe Karnofsky
- Ed Kasky
- Steve Kaufusi
- George Kavel
- Jevon Kearse
- Trevor Keegan
- Ray Keeling
- Rabbit Keen
- Jim Kekeris
- Jason Kelce
- Ken Keller
- Bob Kelley
- Ike Kelley
- Dennis Kelly
- Jim Kelly
- Joe Kelly
- Jeff Kemp
- Drew Kendall
- Mychal Kendricks
- George Kenneally
- Steve Kenney
- Brett Kern
- Ryan Kerrigan
- Merritt Kersey
- Wade Key
- Leroy Keyes
- Howard Keys
