= 1937 Philadelphia Eagles season =

NFL team season

- Owner: Bert Bell
- Head coach: Bert Bell
- Home stadium: Philadelphia Municipal Stadium

Results
- Record: 2–8–1
- Division place: 5th NFL Eastern
- Playoffs: Did not qualify

The 1937 Philadelphia Eagles season marked their fifth year in the National Football League (NFL). While the team improved on their previous output of 1–11, winning two games, it remained mired at the bottom of its division, missing the Championship Playoff for the fifth consecutive season.

== Off season ==
=== NFL draft ===
The 1937 NFL draft took place on December 12, 1936. It would be for 10 rounds, and teams would pick a total of 100 players.

The Eagles would have the 1st pick in the draft. They used this pick to choose, running up in the Heisman Trophy, Sam Francis, a back out of Nebraska. He never played a game for the Eagles but he played for the Chicago Bears.

=== Player selections ===
The table shows the Eagles selections, what picks they had that were traded away, and the team that ended up with that pick. It is possible the Eagles' pick ended up with this team via another team that the Eagles made a trade with. Not shown are acquired picks that the Eagles traded away.

= Pro Bowler	= Hall of Famer

Rd	Pick #	Player	Position	College
1	1	Sam Francis	Back	Nebraska
2	11	Franny Murray	Back	Pennsylvania
3	21	Drew Ellis	Tackle	TCU
4	31	Walt Gilbert	Back	Auburn
5	41	Alex Drobnitch	Back	Denver
6	51	Bill Guckeyson	Back	Maryland
7	61	Herb Barna	Guard	West Virginia
8	71	Nestor Hennon	Back	Carnegie-Mellon
9	81	Paul Fanning	Back	Kansas State
10	91	Ray Antil	Back	Minnesota

== Pre Season ==
The Eagles held their pre-season camp on the grounds of the Oak Lane Country Day School. On August 27, 1937, the Eagles defeated a team of college All-Stars 14 to 6 at Temple Stadium in front of 25,000 fans.

== Regular season ==
The Eagles 1937 NFL season started on September 5 and ended 11 weeks later on November 14. The Eagles would play 4 games at home and 7 games on the road.

=== Schedule ===
Game	Date	Opponent	Result	Record	Venue	Attendance	Recap	Sources
1	September 5	at Pittsburgh Pirates	L 14–27	0–1	Forbes Field	8,588	Recap	
2	September 10	Brooklyn Dodgers	L 7–13	0–2	Municipal Stadium	5,221	Recap	
3	September 21	Cleveland Rams	L 3–21	0–3	Municipal Stadium	3,107	Recap	
4	September 26	Chicago Cardinals	T 6–6	0–3–1	Municipal Stadium	3,912	Recap	
5	October 3	New York Giants	L 7–16	0–4–1	Municipal Stadium	12,127	Recap	
6	October 10	at Washington Redskins	W 14–0	1–4–1	Griffith Stadium	7,320	Recap	
7	October 17	at New York Giants	L 0–21	1–5–1	Polo Grounds	20,089	Recap	
8	October 24	Washington Redskins	L 7–10	1–6–1	Municipal Stadium	6,580	Recap	
9	October 31	at Pittsburgh Pirates	L 7–16	1–7–1	Forbes Field	2,772	Recap	
10	November 7	at Brooklyn Dodgers	W 14–10	2–7–1	Ebbets Field	8,373	Recap	
11	November 14	at Green Bay Packers	L 7–37	2–8–1	Wisconsin State Fair Park	13,340	Recap	

== Standings ==
NFL Eastern Division
	W	L	T	PCT	DIV	PF	PA	STK
Washington Redskins	8	3	0	.727	6–2	195	120	W2
New York Giants	6	3	2	.667	5–2–1	128	109	L1
Pittsburgh Pirates	4	7	0	.364	4–4	122	145	L1
Brooklyn Dodgers	3	7	1	.300	2–5–1	82	174	T1
Philadelphia Eagles	2	8	1	.200	2–6	86	177	L1

Note: Tie games were not officially counted in the standings until 1972.

== NFL Playoffs ==
With a 2–8–1 record in 1937, the Eagles do not make the playoffs and play in the 1937 NFL Championship Game. The Washington Redskins defeated Chicago Bears in Chicago.

== Roster ==
(All time List of Philadelphia Eagles players in franchise history)

A List of the 1937 Philadelphia Eagles.

NO.	Player	AGE	POS	GP	GS	WT	HT	YRS	College
	Bert Bell	42	Coach	_{1937 record} 2–8–1	_{NFL-Eagles Lifetime} 3–19–1			2nd	Pennsylvania
	Jay Arnold	25	HB-WB-DB-BB	10	6	210	6–1	Rookie	Texas
	Winnie Baze	23	B	10	4	190	5–11	Rookie	Missouri, Texas-El Paso
	Art Buss	26	T	11	11	219	6–3	3	Michigan State
	Joe Carter	27	E	10	8	201	6–1	4	Austin, SMU
	Jack Dempsey	25	T	2	1	225	6–2	1	Bucknell
	Fritz Ferko	25	T	10	5	242	6–1	Rookie	Mount St. Mary's University
	Glenn Frey	25	B	6	5	193	5–11	1	Temple
	Swede Hanson	30	B	2	0	192	6–1	6	Temple
	Maurice Harper	27	C	9	3	227	6–4	Rookie	Austin
	Bill Hewitt	28	E-DE	11	11	190	5–9	5	Michigan
	Tex Holcomb	24	T	1	1	235	6–2	Rookie	Texas Tech
	Bill Hughes	22	G-C	11	8	226	6–1	Rookie	Texas
	Rabbit Keen	23	QB	8	0	170	5–9	Rookie	Arkansas
	Charlie Knox	?	B	1	0	185	5–11	Rookie	St. Edmonds
	John Kusko	23	B	10	4	194	5–11	1	Temple
	Jim Leonard	27	B	2	0	204	6–0	3	Notre Dame
	Jim MacMurdo	28	T-G	3	0	209	6–1	5	Pittsburgh
	Bob Masters	26	HB	9	3	200	5–11	Rookie	Baylor
	Forrest McPherson	26	G-C-T	3	0	233	5–11	2	Nebraska
	Emmett Mortell	21	B	11	11	181	6–1	Rookie	Notre Dame, Wisconsin
	Joe Pilconis	26	E	11	3	189	6–1	3	Temple
	George Rado	25	G-DE	9	1	194	5–9	2	Duquesne
	Hank Reese	28	C-G	11	8	214	5–11	4	Temple
	Herb Roton	24	E	9	1	210	6–2	Rookie	Auburn
	Jim Russell	29	G-T	3	1	210	5–11	1	Temple
	Dave Smukler	23	FB-LB	11	11	226	6–1	1	Missouri, Temple
	Ray Spillers	25	T	10	3	218	6–3	Rookie	Arkansas
	Mule Stockton	24	G	11	11	214	6–1	Rookie	McMurry
	Vince Zizak	29	G-T	2	1	208	5–8	3	
	32 Players; Team Average	24.6		11		207.2	6–0.1	1.6	

== Postseason ==
With a record of 2–8–1 the Philadelphia Eagles failed to make it to the NFL Championship game
