= Pennsylvania Polka (American football) =

Sports transactions

Pennsylvania Polka is a name applied retrospectively to a series of moves affecting the Philadelphia Eagles and Pittsburgh Steelers franchises in the National Football League (NFL) from 1940 to 1941.

Art Rooney, the owner of the Pittsburgh Steelers, sold his team to Alexis Thompson on December 10, 1940, and subsequently bought a 50% stake in the Philadelphia Eagles franchise from owner Bert Bell. At the time of the deals, a mini-draft took place between the two teams, using a pool of players from both rosters. This resulted in the Eagles acquiring seven players formerly of the Steelers, and the Steelers obtaining eleven players formerly of the Eagles. The 1941 NFL draft was also held during this time.

Rooney later had second thoughts on the transactions, and made an agreement to swap cities with new Steelers owner Thompson on April 3, 1941. This resulted in the Philadelphia Eagles moving their team to Pittsburgh and becoming the new Pittsburgh Steelers, and the Pittsburgh Steelers moving their team to Philadelphia and becoming the new Philadelphia Eagles. Since NFL franchises at the time were territorial rights distinct from individual corporate entities, the Eagles and Steelers are each officially acknowledged by the NFL as single unbroken entities since 1933, especially since all of these events took place during the offseason. However, the players on the Eagles were basically traded to the Steelers in exchange for their players (with the exception of players who changed teams during the mini-draft, in which case those players "stayed" on the same teams). All players drafted by the Philadelphia Eagles in the 1941 NFL Draft therefore had their rights held by the Pittsburgh Steelers after the final swap, and vice versa.

== Background ==
Both the Philadelphia Eagles and Pittsburgh Pirates franchises were founded in 1933, after blue laws in Pennsylvania were rescinded to allow organized sports teams to play on Sundays. Bert Bell and Lud Wray founded the Eagles, and Art Rooney founded the Pirates. The Pirates became the Pittsburgh Steelers in 1940.

Wray coached the Eagles in their first three years from 1933 to 1935, with no winning seasons, compiling a 9–21–1 record. In that time period, the partners exhausted $85,000 ($1,972,122 in 2024 dollars). At a public auction in 1936, Bell became sole owner of the Eagles with a bid of $4,500 (presently$, 104,406). Austerity measures forced him to supplant Wray as head coach as well, but Bell also did not produce a winning season, finishing the 1940 season with a 1–10 record and a 10–44–2 overall career coaching record.

By 1940, the Steelers were on their fifth head coach in eight years. Like the Eagles, the Steelers had not posted a winning record in their franchise's history. Walt Kiesling entered his second season as head coach of the Steelers in 1940. Before the 1940 season, Rooney said if the Steelers had another losing season he would be compelled to sell the team. The team started the season at 1–0–2 before falling at home by a score of 10–3 to a Brooklyn Dodgers squad coached by local hero Jock Sutherland. He had assumed the head job for the Dodgers that year after spurning a similar offer from Pittsburgh. The loss to the Dodgers began a six-game losing streak, before the team traded wins with the Eagles to cap a 2–7–2 season in which they scored a total of just 60 points. Over eight years, the team had compiled a record of 24–62–5 and had lost around $100,000 ($2.3 million today). Rooney was also concerned about the availability of players in the coming seasons due to the ongoing war in Europe and the specter of a military draft.

== Initial sales ==
After turning down several earlier offers to relocate or sell the team, in December 1940, Rooney sold the Steelers to Alexis Thompson. Thompson was a 26-year-old, Yale-educated heir to a steel fortune and an entrepreneur living in New York.

Thompson originally sought to buy the Eagles from Bell in November 1940, but Bell connected him with Rooney to make an offer on the Steelers. The Steelers hired Bell to negotiate the sale and promised him a 20% cut of the sale price if it sold within 30 days. The purchase price was reported to be $160,000 ($3.7 million today). This price was less than the $225,000 ($5.2 million today) the Detroit Lions had previously sold for, but the Lions had won an NFL championship. Bell earned $32,000 from the sale. The transaction was completed and announced on the same day that the Chicago Bears pummeled the Washington Redskins by a score of 73–0 in the most lopsided NFL championship game of all time.

Rooney immediately took $50,000 from the sale and invested it in a 50% interest in the Philadelphia Eagles franchise, which was owned by his friend Bell, and became vice president of the franchise's board of directors.

=== Mini-draft ===
In an unusual twist Rooney, Bell, and Thompson pooled the rosters of the two squads and conducted essentially a mini-draft to distribute the talent. The 51 players which were signed to the Steelers and Eagles at the end of the 1940 season were shuffled between the two teams. In this transaction, the Rooney/Bell team added eleven players from the 1940 Steelers: ends George Platukis, Walt Kichefski and John Klumb; tackles Clark Goff and Ted Doyle; guards Carl Nery and Jack Sanders; and backs Boyd Brumbaugh, John Noppenberg, George Kiick and Rocco Pirro. In exchange, Thompson's team gained seven players: ends Joe Carter and Herschel Ramsey, tackles Phil Ragazzo and Clem Woltman, guard Ted Schmitt, and backs Joe Bukant and Foster Watkins, all of whom had played for Bell's 1940 Eagles the prior year.

Thompson hired Greasy Neale, whom Rooney had pursued to coach the Pirates in 1933, to conduct this player swap as well as to assist him with the draft which took place the day after the deal with Rooney was finalized. Once he was released from his contract with Yale, Neale became head coach of Thompson's team to replace Kiesling. In January 1941, Thompson renamed his new squad the Iron Men.

== Re-swap ==
Despite now being a full partner in the Eagles with Bell, Rooney had no intention of leaving Pittsburgh. It was thought that Thompson preferred to move his new team to be nearer his New York home, perhaps to Boston, which had been without an NFL team since the Redskins relocated to Washington in 1937. If Thompson had moved the team away from Pittsburgh, Rooney and Bell hatched a plan that would have seen their team split its home games between the two Pennsylvania cities and rename their squad the Keystoners. However, the other league owners blocked both moves.

By early 1941, Rooney was beginning to regret his decision to sell the Steelers. When he saw that Thompson had not yet established a local office for his team, as he had announced he would do by March 1, Rooney made an offer: he and Bell would trade territories with Thompson. This would put Thompson in Philadelphia, which was much closer to his New York base. It would also ensure that Rooney's team would stay in his hometown. On April 3, 1941, Thompson accepted the deal. Rooney and Bell moved their organization to Pittsburgh as the Pittsburgh Steelers. Thompson's Iron Men moved to Philadelphia, where they took on the Philadelphia Eagles moniker. This was described at the time as "one of the most unusual swaps in sports history". In fact, the Steelers' corporate name remained "Philadelphia Eagles Football Club, Inc." until 1945. Bell was named the Steelers head coach and Rooney became the general manager, with 10-year contracts worth $7,500 per year.

== Aftermath ==
Because the entire strange turn of events all took place during the offseason and the Eagles and Steelers never actually missed games in Philadelphia and Pittsburgh, respectively, the NFL considers each franchise as single unbroken entities since 1933. The transaction, which amounted in the end to Bell selling the Eagles and purchasing half-interest in the Steelers, as well as trading more than half of each team's rosters to each other, was termed by later historians as the "Pennsylvania Polka".

Both teams continued to struggle in 1941, with the Eagles going 2–8–1 and the Steelers going 1–9–1. However, the Steelers posted their first winning record in 1942 (7–4), while the Eagles finished 2–9. In 1943, when manpower shortages stemming from World War II made it impossible to fill the roster, the two teams temporarily merged to form a team popularly known as the "Steagles". The merger, never intended as a permanent arrangement, was dissolved at the end of the 1943 season. The Steagles posted a 5–4–1 record, giving the Eagles their first winning record as a franchise and continuing the Steelers' streak. The Steelers had to combine with the Chicago Cardinals in 1944 to form "Card-Pitt"; the merged team lost all ten of their games that season. The Eagles went to three NFL Championship games under Neale, losing in 1947, and winning in 1948 and 1949. The Steelers did not win their first league title until Super Bowl IX in 1974.

After the 1949 season, Thompson sold the Eagles to a syndicate of 100 buyers, known as the "Happy Hundred", each of whom paid a fee of $3,000 for their share of the team. The Rooney family has remained the owners of the Steelers since its founding in 1933, with Art's son, Dan, taking over the team following his death in 1988.

== Personnel involved ==
Positions key
E	N/A	B	N/A	HB	N/A	TB	N/A
DB	N/A	T	N/A	G	N/A	FB	N/A
C	N/A	DE	N/A	MG	N/A	DT	N/A
LB	N/A	K	N/A	QB	N/A	HC	Head coach

Players and coaches on the 1940–1941 Philadelphia Eagles and Pittsburgh Steelers rosters:
Name	Pos.	1940 Team	Post-Move Team	Acquired through
Bert Bell	HC	Eagles	Steelers^{[a]}	Team move to Pittsburgh
Walt Kiesling	HC	Steelers	Steelers^{[a]}	Re-hired by Rooney
Greasy Neale	HC	Yale^{[b]}	Eagles	Hired by Thompson
Jay Arnold	B	Eagles	Steelers	Re-signed
Dick Bassi	G	Eagles	Steelers	Team move to Pittsburgh
Joe Bukant	B	Eagles	Eagles	Mini-draft
Joe Carter	E	Eagles	Eagles	Mini-draft
Chuck Cherundolo	C	Eagles	Steelers	Team move to Pittsburgh
John Cole	FB	Eagles	None	Retired
Woody Dow	B	Eagles	None	Retired
Frank Emmons	FB	Eagles	Steelers	Team move to Pittsburgh
Ray George	T	Eagles	None	Retired
Jerry Ginney	G	Eagles	None	Retired
Elmer Hackney	FB	Eagles	Steelers	Team move to Pittsburgh
Maurice Harper	C	Eagles	Steelers	Team move to Pittsburgh
Billy Hughes	G	Eagles	Bears	Free agent
Elmer Kolberg	HB	Eagles	Steelers	Team move to Pittsburgh
Don Looney	E	Eagles	Steelers	Team move to Pittsburgh
Les McDonald	E	Eagles	None	Retired
Fran Murray	HB / P	Eagles	Steelers	Team move to Pittsburgh
Chuck Newton	FB	Eagles	Steelers	Team move to Pittsburgh
Davey O'Brien	QB	Eagles	None	Retired
Phil Ragazzo	T	Eagles	Eagles	Mini-draft
Red Ramsey	E	Eagles	Eagles	Mini-draft
Dick Riffle	FB	Eagles	Steelers	Re-signed
Theodore Schmitt	G	Eagles	Eagles	Mini-draft
Elbie Schultz	T	Eagles	Steelers	Team move to Pittsburgh
George Somers	T / K	Eagles	Steelers	Team move to Pittsburgh
Russ Thompson	T	Eagles	Steelers	Team move to Pittsburgh
Milt Trost	T	Eagles	None	Retired
Foster Watkins	BB	Eagles	Eagles	Mini-draft
Joe Wendlick	E	Eagles	Steelers	Team move to Pittsburgh
Clem Woltman	T	Eagles	Eagles	Mini-draft
Sam Boyd	E / KR	Steelers	Eagles	Team move to Philadelphia
Hank Bruder	BB	Steelers	Eagles	Team move to Philadelphia
Boyd Brumbaugh	B	Steelers	Steelers	Mini-draft
Frank Bykowski	G	Steelers	Chiefs	Free agent
Don Campbell	T	Steelers	Eagles	Team move to Philadelphia
Merl Condit	HB	Steelers	Eagles	Team move to Philadelphia
Ted Doyle	T	Steelers	Steelers	Mini-draft
Ev Fisher	BB	Steelers	None	Retired
Clark Goff	T	Steelers	Steelers	Mini-draft
Ted Grabinski	C	Steelers	Eagles	Team move to Philadelphia
Swede Johnston	B	Steelers	Eagles	Team move to Philadelphia
Walt Kichefski	E	Steelers	Steelers	Mini-draft
George Kiick	FB	Steelers	Steelers	Mini-draft
John Klumb	E	Steelers	Steelers	Mini-draft
Joe Maras	C	Steelers	Eagles	Team move to Philadelphia
Coley McDonough	B	Steelers	Eagles	Team move to Philadelphia^{[c]}
Carl Nery	G	Steelers	Steelers	Mini-draft
Armand Niccolai	T / K	Steelers	Eagles	Team move to Philadelphia^{[c]}
John Noppenberg	B	Steelers	Steelers	Mini-draft
Billy Patterson	B / P	Steelers	Eagles	Team move to Philadelphia
Stan Pavkov	G	Steelers	Eagles	Team move to Philadelphia
John Perko	G	Steelers	Eagles	Team move to Philadelphia
Rocco Pirro	G	Steelers	Steelers	Mini-draft
George Platukis	E	Steelers	Steelers	Mini-draft
Jack Sanders	G	Steelers	Steelers	Mini-draft
John Schmidt	C	Steelers	None	Retired
Bill Sortet	E	Steelers	Eagles	Team move to Philadelphia
Frank Sullivan	C	Steelers	Eagles	Team move to Philadelphia
Tommy Thompson	QB	Steelers	Eagles	Team move to Philadelphia
Lou Tomasetti	HB	Steelers	Eagles	Team move to Philadelphia
John Woudenberg	T	Steelers	Eagles	Team move to Philadelphia^{[c]}
John Yurchey	B	Steelers	None	Retired

=== Footnotes ===
- ^{a} Bell was the Steelers' head coach for the first two games of the 1941 season before Rooney told him to resign. Aldo Donelli, the football coach at Duquesne University coached the remainder of the season. Because he was still coaching at Duquesne, Kiesling filled in as Steelers coach when there were scheduling conflicts.
- ^{b} Neale was the backs coach at Yale from 1934 to 1940.
- ^{c} McDonough, Niccolai, and Woudenberg were later traded back to the Steelers for the 1941 season.

== Bibliography ==
- Claassen, Harold (Spike) (1963). The History of Professional Football. Englewood Cliffs, NJ: Prentice-Hall, Inc.
- Lyons, Robert S. (2010). On Any Given Sunday, A Life of Bert Bell. Philadelphia: Temple University Press. ISBN 978-1-59213-731-2.
- MacCambridge, Michael (2005). America's Game. New York: Anchor Books. ISBN 978-0-307-48143-6.
- Rooney, Art Jr.; McHugh, Roy (2008). Ruanaidh: The Story of Art Rooney and His Clan. Pittsburgh, PA: Art Rooney Jr. ISBN 9780981476025.
- Ruck, Rob; Patterson, Maggie Jones; Weber, Michael P. (2010). Rooney: A Sporting Life. Lincoln, Neb.: University of Nebraska Press. ISBN 978-0-8032-2283-0.
