= 1937 Pittsburgh Pirates (NFL) season =

NFL team season

1937 Pittsburgh Pirates season
- Owner: Art Rooney
- Head coach: Johnny Blood
- Home stadium: Forbes Field

Results
- Record: 4–7
- Division place: 3rd NFL Eastern
- Playoffs: Did not qualify

Program cover for the Pirates' Oct. 24 home game against the Chicago Cardinals showing Forbes Field configured for football.

The 1937 Pittsburgh Pirates season was the team's fifth season as a professional sports club in the National Football League (NFL). The team hired Johnny Blood as head coach after John Bach stepped down during the offseason. Blood was a former player, who played halfback for the Pirates during the 1934 season. His team finished with another 4–7 record however, Blood was welcomed back the next season.

== Offseason ==
=== Draft ===
1937 Pittsburgh Pirates draft
Round	Pick	Player	Position	College	Notes
1	5	Mike Basrak	C	Duquesne	
2	15	Bob Finley	B	SMU	Played pro baseball
3	25	Bill Breeden	B	Oklahoma	
4	35	Elmo "Bo" Hewes	B	Oklahoma	
5	45	Jack Frye	B	Missouri	
6	55	Walt Roach	E	TCU	
7	65	Byron Haines	HB	Washington	
8	75	Marty Kordich	G	Saint Mary's (CA)	
9	85	Matt Patanelli	E	Michigan	
10	95	Stan Nevers	T	Kentucky	
Made roster

== Regular season ==
=== Schedule ===
Week	Date	Opponent	Result	Record	Venue	Recap
1	September 5	**Philadelphia Eagles**	**W** 27–14	1–0	Forbes Field	Recap
2	Bye					
3	September 19	at **Brooklyn Dodgers**	**W** 21–0	2–0	Ebbets Field	Recap
4	September 26	**New York Giants**	**L** 7–10	2–1	Forbes Field	Recap
5	October 4	Chicago Bears	**L** 0–7	2–2	Forbes Field	Recap
6	October 10	at Detroit Lions	**L** 3–7	2–3	University of Detroit Stadium	Recap
7	October 17	at **Washington Redskins**	**L** 20–34	2–4	Griffith Stadium	Recap
8	October 24	Chicago Cardinals	**L** 7–13	2–5	Forbes Field	Recap
9	October 31	**Philadelphia Eagles**	**W** 16–7	3–5	Forbes Field	Recap
10	November 7	at **New York Giants**	**L** 0–17	3–6	Polo Grounds	Recap
11	November 14	**Washington Redskins**	**W** 21–13	4–6	Forbes Field	Recap
12	November 21	**Brooklyn Dodgers**	**L** 0–23	4–7	Forbes Field	Recap
13	Bye					
14	Bye					
Note: Intra-division opponents are in **bold** text.

=== Game summaries ===
==== Week 1 (Sunday September 5, 1937): Philadelphia Eagles ====
	1	2	3	4	Total
Eagles	0	7	0	7	**14**
**Pirates**	7	0	7	13	**27**

at Forbes Field, Pittsburgh, Pennsylvania

- Game time:
- Game weather:
- Game attendance: 8,588
- Referee:

Scoring Drives:

- Pittsburgh – Brett 39 pass from Thompson (Weinstock kick)
- Philadelphia – Hanson 3 run (Smukler kick)
- Pittsburgh – Davidson 19 pass from Gildea (Niccolai kick)
- Philadelphia – Hewitt 7 pass from Smukler (Smukler kick)
- Pittsburgh – Blood 92 kick return (Breeden kick)
- Pittsburgh – Blood 44 pass from Fiske (kick failed)

==== Week 2 (Sunday September 19, 1937): Brooklyn Dodgers ====
	1	2	3	4	Total
**Pirates**	0	7	7	7	**21**
Dodgers	0	0	0	0	**0**

at Ebbets Field, Brooklyn, New York

- Game time:
- Game weather:
- Game attendance: 18,000
- Referee:

Scoring Drives:

- Pittsburgh – Karcis 3 run (Kakasic kick)
- Pittsburgh – Gildea 1 run (Kakasic kick)
- Pittsburgh – Blood 6 pass from Fiske (Niccolai kick)

==== Week 3 (Sunday September 26, 1937): New York Giants ====
	1	2	3	4	Total
**Giants**	0	7	0	3	**10**
Pirates	0	0	7	0	**7**

at Forbes Field, Pittsburgh, Pennsylvania

- Game time:
- Game weather:
- Game attendance: 33,095
- Referee:

Scoring Drives:

- New York – Richards 13 pass from Danowski (Manton kick)
- Pittsburgh – Karcis 4 run (Niccolai kick)
- New York – FG Manton 13

==== Week 4 (Monday October 4, 1937): Chicago Bears ====
	1	2	3	4	Total
**Bears**	0	0	7	0	**7**
Pirates	0	0	0	0	**0**

at Forbes Field, Pittsburgh, Pennsylvania

- Game time:
- Game weather:
- Game attendance: 22,511
- Referee:

Scoring Drives:

- Chicago Bears – Nolting 13 run (Manders kick)

==== Week 5 (Sunday October 10, 1937): Detroit Lions ====
	1	2	3	4	Total
Pirates	0	3	0	0	**3**
**Lions**	0	0	7	0	**7**

at Titan Stadium, Detroit, Michigan

- Game time:
- Game weather:
- Game attendance: 16,000
- Referee:

Scoring Drives:

- Pittsburgh – FG Niccolai 11
- Detroit – Caddel 2 run (Clark kick)

==== Week 6 (Sunday October 17, 1937): Washington Redskins ====
	1	2	3	4	Total
Pirates	0	13	0	7	**20**
**Redskins**	7	0	13	14	**34**

at Griffith Stadium, Washington, DC

- Game time:
- Game weather:
- Game attendance: 12,835
- Referee:

Scoring Drives:

- Washington – Battles 65 interception (Smith kick)
- Pittsburgh – Blood 43 pass from Fiske (Weinstock kick)
- Pittsburgh – Thompson 55 pass from Blood (kick blocked)
- Washington – Malone 7 pass from Baugh
- Washington – Justice 3 pass from Smith (Smith kick)
- Washington – Battles 60 run (Smith kick)
- Washington – Battles 62 run (Smith kick)
- Pittsburgh – Blood 2 pass from Karcis (Niccolai kick)

==== Week 7 (Sunday October 24, 1937): Chicago Cardinals ====
	1	2	3	4	Total
**Cardinals**	0	0	7	6	**13**
Pirates	0	0	0	7	**7**

at Forbes Field, Pittsburgh, Pennsylvania

- Game time:
- Game weather:
- Game attendance: 8,963
- Referee:

Scoring Drives:

- Chicago Cardinals – Deskin 18 pass from Coffee (May kick)
- Chicago Cardinals – Lawrence 2 run (kick failed)
- Pittsburgh – Davidson 65 pass from Fiske (Weinstock kick)

==== Week 8 (Sunday October 31, 1937): Philadelphia Eagles ====
	1	2	3	4	Total
Eagles	7	0	0	0	**7**
**Pirates**	6	3	7	0	**16**

at Forbes Field, Pittsburgh, Pennsylvania

- Game time:
- Game weather:
- Game attendance: 2,772
- Referee:

Scoring Drives:

- Philadelphia – Pilconis 22 fumble run (Smukler kick)
- Pittsburgh – Davidson 87 interception (kick failed)
- Pittsburgh – FG Niccolai 27
- Pittsburgh – Sortet 26 pass from Gildea (Niccolai kick)

==== Week 9 (Sunday November 7, 1937): New York Giants ====
	1	2	3	4	Total
Pirates	0	0	0	0	**0**
**Giants**	0	7	3	7	**17**

at Polo Grounds, New York, NY

- Game time:
- Game weather:
- Game attendance: 21,447
- Referee:

Scoring Drives:

- New York – Burnett 5 pass from Danowski (Manton kick)
- New York – FG Cuf 35
- New York – Soar 25 interception

==== Week 10 (Sunday November 14, 1937): Washington Redskins ====
	1	2	3	4	Total
Redskins	6	0	0	7	**13**
**Pirates**	7	2	3	9	**21**

at Forbes Field, Pittsburgh, Pennsylvania

- Game time:
- Game weather:
- Game attendance: 12,000
- Referee:

Scoring Drives:

- Washington – Pinckert 3 pass from Smith (kick failed)
- Pittsburgh – Davidson 68 run (Weinstock kick)
- Pittsburgh – Safety, Baugh tackled in end zone by Mayhew
- Pittsburgh – FG Niccolai 21
- Washington – Justice 40 pass from Baugh (Smith kick)
- Pittsburgh – FG Niccolai 41
- Pittsburgh – Karcis 21 run (kick failed)

==== Week 11 (Sunday November 21, 1937): Brooklyn Dodgers ====
	1	2	3	4	Total
**Dodgers**	0	0	13	10	**23**
Pirates	0	0	0	0	**0**

- Game time:
- Game weather:
- Game attendance: 3,706
- Referee:

Scoring Drives:

- Brooklyn – Parker 2 run (Parker kick)
- Brooklyn – Parker 44 punt return (kick failed)
- Brooklyn – FG Maniaci 29
- Brooklyn – Mitchell 15 pass from Parker (Maniaci kick)

== Roster ==
1937 Pittsburgh Pirates final roster
Backs: 15 Johnny Blood RB/S; 12 Bill Davidson RB/CB; 33 Johnny Gildea RB/S; 53 By Haines RB/CB; 64 Bull Karcis FB/LB; 29 Stu Smith FB/LB; 27 Tuffy Thompson RB/CB; 47 Izzy Weinstock FB/LB/K; 29 Silvio Zaninelli RB/S; Ends/Receivers: 44 Bill Breeden; 24 Jeep Brett; 10 Mac Cara; 53 Bill Sortet	Linemen/Linebackers: 11 Mike Basrak C/LB; 30 Joe Cardwell G/DG/T/DT; 18 Byron Gentry G/DG; 14 George Kakasic G/DG/K; 36 Ed Karpowich T/DT; 35 Walt Kiesling G/DG; 40 Lindy Mayhew G/DG/T/DT; 17 Armand Niccolai T/DT/K; 39 John Perko G/DG; 13 Buster Raborn C/LB; Rookies in italics

== Standings ==
NFL Eastern Division
	W	L	T	PCT	DIV	PF	PA	STK
Washington Redskins	8	3	0	.727	6–2	195	120	W2
New York Giants	6	3	2	.667	5–2–1	128	109	L1
Pittsburgh Pirates	4	7	0	.364	4–4	122	145	L1
Brooklyn Dodgers	3	7	1	.300	2–5–1	82	174	T1
Philadelphia Eagles	2	8	1	.200	2–6	86	177	L1

Note: Tie games were not officially counted in the standings until 1972.
