= 1937 Brooklyn Dodgers (NFL) season =

National Football League team season

1937 Brooklyn Dodgers season
- Owner: Dan Topping
- Head coach: Potsy Clark
- Home stadium: Ebbets Field

Results
- Record: 3–7–1
- Division place: 4th NFL Eastern
- Playoffs: Did not qualify

The 1937 Brooklyn Dodgers season was their eighth in the league. The team improved on their previous season's output of 3–8–1, losing only seven games. They failed to qualify for the playoffs for the sixth consecutive season.

== Schedule ==
Week	Date	Opponent	Result	Record	Venue
1	Bye				
2	September 10	at **Philadelphia Eagles**	**W** 13–7	1–0	Philadelphia Municipal Stadium
3	September 19	**Pittsburgh Pirates**	**L** 0–21	1–1	Ebbets Field
4	September 26	Cleveland Rams	**W** 9–7	2–1	Ebbets Field
5	October 3	at **Washington Redskins**	**L** 7–11	2–2	Griffith Stadium
6	Bye				
7	October 17	at Detroit Lions	**L** 0–30	2–3	University of Detroit Stadium
8	October 24	at **New York Giants**	**L** 0–21	2–4	Polo Grounds
9	October 31	**Washington Redskins**	**L** 0–21	2–5	Ebbets Field
10	November 7	**Philadelphia Eagles**	**L** 10–14	2–6	Ebbets Field
11	November 14	at Chicago Bears	**L** 7–29	2–7	Wrigley Field
12	November 21	at **Pittsburgh Pirates**	**W** 23–0	3–7	Forbes Field
13	November 25	**New York Giants**	**T** 13–13	3–7–1	Ebbets Field
Note: Intra-division opponents are in **bold** text.

== Roster ==
1937 Brooklyn Dodgers final roster
**Backs**: 5 Vannie Albanese RB/CB; 3 Dick Crayne FB/LB; 4 Bert Johnson FB/LB/P; 9 Tony Kaska RB/CB; 1 Ralph Kercheval RB/CB/S/K; 2 Joe Maniaci FB/LB/K; 7 Ace Parker RB/S; **Ends/Receivers**: 19 Jim Austin; 11 Jeff Barrett; 13 Frank Cumiskey; 12 Buster Mitchell	**Linemen/Linebackers**: 23 Norm Cooper C/LB; 14 Ave Daniell T/DT; 17 John Golemgeske T/G/DT; 24 Wagner Jorgensen C/LB; 22 Rube Leisk G/DG; 20 Don Nelson G/DG; 15 Sandy Sandberg T/DT; 18 Ed Skoronski G/DG; 16 Jim Whatley T/DT; **Reserve**: John Yezerski T/DT (DNR); Rookies in italics

== Standings ==
NFL Eastern Division
	W	L	T	PCT	DIV	PF	PA	STK
Washington Redskins	8	3	0	.727	6–2	195	120	W2
New York Giants	6	3	2	.667	5–2–1	128	109	L1
Pittsburgh Pirates	4	7	0	.364	4–4	122	145	L1
Brooklyn Dodgers	3	7	1	.300	2–5–1	82	174	T1
Philadelphia Eagles	2	8	1	.200	2–6	86	177	L1

Note: Tie games were not officially counted in the standings until 1972.
