= Bassman =

Bassman may refer to:

- Fender Bassman, bass amplifier
- 1st Bassman, album by Paul Chambers

== People ==
- Bassman (surname)

== See also ==
- Baseman (disambiguation), one of several fielding positions in softball and baseball
