= Heavener =

Heavener can refer to:

- David Heavener (born 1958), entertainer
- Heavener, Oklahoma, U.S.
- Heavener (album), a 2023 album by Invent Animate

== See also ==
- Heavener Runestone, stones of modern origin found near Heavener, Oklahoma, U.S.
- Heavener High School, Heavener, Oklahoma, U.S.
