= 1936 All-Big Six Conference football team =

The 1936 All-Big Six Conference football team consists of American football players chosen by various organizations for All-Big Six Conference teams for the 1936 college football season. The selectors for the 1936 season included the Associated Press (AP).

== All-Big Six selections ==
=== Backs ===
- Jack Frye, Missouri (AP-1)
- Lloyd Cardwell, Nebraska (AP-1)
- Maurice Elder, Kansas State (AP-1)
- Sam Francis, Nebraska (AP-1)
- Cleveland, Kansas State (AP-2)
- Elmo Hewes, Oklahoma (AP-2)
- Ronald Douglas, Nebraska (AP-2)
- Bill Breeden, Oklahoma (AP-2)

=== Ends ===
- Les McDonald, Nebraska (AP-1)
- Clarence Gustine, Iowa State (AP-1)
- Dave Shirk, Kansas (AP-2)
- Pete Smith, Oklahoma (AP-2)

=== Tackles ===
- Fred Shirey, Nebraska (AP-1)
- Paul Fanning, Kansas State (AP-1)
- Dick Schafroth, Iowa State (AP-2)
- Ted Doyle, Nebraska (AP-2)

=== Guards ===
- Kenneth McGinnis, Nebraska (AP-1)
- Rolla Holland, Kansas State (AP-1)
- Connie Ahrens, Oklahoma (AP-2)
- Ed Bock, Iowa State (AP-2)

=== Centers ===
- Red Conkright, Oklahoma (AP-1)
- Charley Brock, Nebraska (AP-2)

== Key ==
AP = Associated Press

== See also ==
- 1936 College Football All-America Team
