= Todd Herremans =

American football player (born 1982)

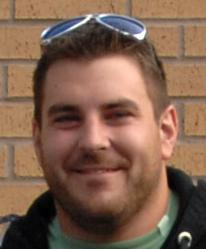
- Herremans in 2008

No. 79
- Position: Offensive guard

Personal information
- Born: October 13, 1982 (age 44); Ravenna, Michigan, U.S.
- Listed height: 6 ft 6 in (1.98 m)
- Listed weight: 323 lb (147 kg)

Career information
- High school: Ravenna
- College: Saginaw Valley State (2001–2004)
- NFL draft: 2005: 4th round, 126th overall pick

Career history
- Philadelphia Eagles (2005–2014); Indianapolis Colts (2015)

Awards and highlights
- First-team Little All-American (2004); Great Lakes Intercollegiate Athletic Conference Offensive Lineman of the Year (2004); First-team All-Region (2003)

Career NFL statistics
- Games played: 135
- Games started: 126
- Receptions: 2
- Receiving yards: 3
- Receiving touchdowns: 2
- Stats at Pro Football Reference

Todd Herremans (born October 13, 1982) is an American former professional football player who was an offensive guard for 11 seasons in the National Football League (NFL). He played college football for the Saginaw Valley State Cardinals and was selected in the fourth round of the 2005 NFL draft by the Philadelphia Eagles, where he spent ten seasons. During his NFL career, Herremans started 126 of a total 135 games played in.

== High school and college career ==
Herremans attended Ravenna High School in Ravenna, Michigan. Following his junior season, he earned first team all-West Michigan Conference and all-area class C-D honors at offensive tackle. Following his senior season, Herremans earned class C, CC all-state honors and a spot on the MHSFCA All-Star Game west roster. He also played basketball earning first team all-West Michigan Conference. As a pitcher on the baseball team, he was two strikes away from a perfect game in a 4-1 win against Coopersville High School and earned second team all-area honors as a catcher. He also participated on the track and field team competing in the shot put.

While in high school, he worked for Swanson Pickle Company and owned a 1987 gold Cadillac.

Herremans played college football for Saginaw Valley State University, playing in 48 games and starting in 40 of them at left and right offensive tackle. Herremans earned first-team Associated Press Little All-America honors as well as AFCA Division II All-American following his senior season in 2004. He was also named first team all-conference and co-offensive lineman of the year in the GLIAC. He was invited to the Cactus Bowl and the Las Vegas All-American Classic all-star games after the season.

== Professional career ==
=== Pre-draft ===
Pre-draft measurables
Height	Weight	40-yard dash	Vertical jump	Bench press
6 ft 5 3/4 in (1.97 m)	324 lb (147 kg)	5.20 s	30 in (0.76 m)	20 reps
All values from Pro Day workout on March 17, 2005.

Not invited to the NFL Scouting Combine, Herremans worked out for more than 24 NFL teams prior to the 2005 NFL draft. He was projected to be drafted in the fifth or sixth round by NFLDraftScout.com.

=== Philadelphia Eagles ===
Herremans was selected by the Philadelphia Eagles in the fourth round (126th overall) of the draft. The Eagles traded up with the Green Bay Packers to choose him, giving away fifth-, sixth-, and seventh-round draft picks (the Packers used these picks to select cornerback Mike Hawkins and safety Kurt Campbell; the sixth-round pick was traded to the New England Patriots for sixth- and seventh-round picks, which were used to select wide receiver Craig Bragg and offensive guard Will Whitticker). Herremans signed a four-year contract with the Eagles on June 13, 2005.

Herremans practiced with fellow 2005 draft pick Calvin Armstrong as the starting left tackle in training camp due to Tra Thomas having a blood clot in his leg and missing much of camp. Herremans started in the first three preseason games, against the Pittsburgh Steelers, Baltimore Ravens, and Cincinnati Bengals, respectively, at left tackle in Thomas's place. Thomas returned in time for the fourth preseason game. Herremans was listed as inactive for the first ten games of the season before Thomas suffered a back injury that forced him to be placed on the injured reserve list on November 25, ending his season. Herremans started in place of Thomas at left tackle in his first NFL game, a week 12 match-up against the Green Bay Packers on November 27. In his fourth start, a week 15 game against the St. Louis Rams on December 18, Herremans had to be carted off the field in the second quarter of the game after suffering a fractured ankle. His season ended with his placement on the injured reserve list on December 20.

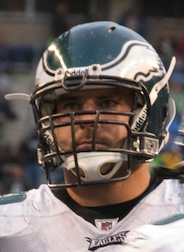
Herremans in November 2008.

With the departure of Artis Hicks, Herremans earned a starting job at left offensive guard in 2006. Against the Baltimore Ravens in the third preseason game, however, Hank Fraley received some playing time with the first-team offense at left guard in Herremans' place. Herremans started in all 16 games for the Eagles at left guard, in addition to their two playoff games. He suffered a lacerated finger against the Indianapolis Colts on November 26 that required five stitches, but did not miss any game action. He signed a five-year contract extension on December 30, 2006, worth between $16 million and $17 million with a $5 million signing bonus that extended through the 2013 NFL season. He moved to left tackle to replace Thomas during the final regular season game, as head coach Andy Reid decided to rest his offensive tackles with a playoff berth already clinched. Herremans was part of an offensive line that only allowed 28 sacks in the entire season, the least since 1981 for the Eagles.

Herremans started in 15 of the 16 games he played in at left guard in 2007. Herremans was benched in favor of Nick Cole for the opening drive of the week 14 game against the New York Giants on December 9 due to undisclosed disciplinary reasons. During the Eagles' bye week, he underwent arthroscopic knee surgery to fix a cartilage problem he had dealt with for a long period of time on October 2. He was, however, able to play in the week six game against the New York Jets the following week.

Against the Seattle Seahawks on November 2, 2008, despite dislocating his finger earlier in the second quarter, Herremans scored his first career touchdown via a tackle eligible play, becoming the first Eagles offensive lineman to catch a touchdown pass since Bob Gonya caught a four-yard touchdown from Dan Barnhardt in 1934. Herremans missed the first five games of the 2009 season due to a stress fracture in his left foot.

Herremans was placed on the Active/Physically Unable to Perform list at the beginning of training camp on July 26, 2010. He was activated on August 15. The second touchdown of his career came on the road against the Dallas Cowboys on December 12, 2010; he entered a third-and-goal formation as an eligible receiver and caught a two-yard touchdown pass from Philadelphia quarterback Michael Vick.

Herremans was moved to right offensive tackle on August 27, 2011, for the 2011 season due to injuries to incumbent starter Winston Justice and newly signed player Ryan Harris. Herremans started in all 16 games for the Eagles in 2011.

Herremans was signed to a three-year contract extension on March 13, 2012, putting him under contract through the 2016 season. In week 9 of the 2012 season, Herremans suffered a dislocated bone and ligament damage in his right foot, and was placed on injured reserve, ending his season.

Herremans was released by the Eagles on February 26, 2015. His 124 career starts over the course of 10 seasons ranked him sixth all-time among Eagles' offensive lineman. His two touchdown receptions as an offensive lineman ranked him first.

=== Indianapolis Colts ===
On March 8, 2015, Herremans signed a contract with the Indianapolis Colts. Herremans started the first two games, but was benched by the Colts after an 0–2 start. He was waived on December 15, 2015.

== Medical cannabis advocacy ==
Herremans is an advocate for the medical use of cannabis, which he says can help reduce addiction to opioids among NFL players. Herremans says he found cannabis to be an effective pain reliever while playing in the NFL, prior to failing a drug test and discontinuing its use during his second season. Herremans is a member of Athletes for Care, a group that advocates for athletes on various issues of health and safety including the use of cannabis as medicine.
