= 1935 All-Big Six Conference football team =

The 1935 All-Big Six Conference football team consists of American football players chosen by various organizations for All-Big Six Conference teams for the 1935 college football season. The selectors for the 1935 season included the Associated Press (AP).

== All-Big Six selections ==
=== Backs ===
- Lloyd Cardwell, Nebraska (AP-1)
- Jerry LaNoue, Nebraska (AP-1)
- Sam Francis, Nebraska (AP-1)
- Leo Ayers, Kansas State (AP-1)
- Henry Bauer, Nebraska (AP-2)
- Bill Breeden, Oklahoma (AP-2)
- George Hapgood, Kansas (AP-2)
- John Peterson, Kansas (AP-2)

=== Ends ===
- Rutherford Hayes, Kansas (AP-1)
- Bernie Scherer, Nebraska (AP-1)
- Ralph Churchill, Kansas State (AP-2)
- Les McDonald, Nebraska (AP-2)

=== Tackles ===
- Fred Shirey, Nebraska (AP-1)
- J. W. "Dub" Wheeler, Oklahoma (AP-1)
- Don Flenthrope, Kansas State (AP-2)
- Harold Schafroth, Iowa State (AP-2)

=== Guards ===
- Dick Sklar, Kansas (AP-1)
- Ike Hayes, Iowa State (AP-1)
- Tom McCall, Kansas (AP-2)
- John Williams, Nebraska (AP-2)

=== Centers ===
- Edwin Phelps, Kansas (AP-1)
- Houston Betty, Missouri (AP-2)

== Key ==
AP = Associated Press

== See also ==
- 1935 College Football All-America Team
