= Bassman (surname) =

Bassman is a surname. Notable people with the surname include:

- Don Bassman (1927–1993), American sound engineer
- George Bassman (1914–1997), American composer
- Lillian Bassman (1917–2012), American photographer
- Reds Bassman (1913–2010), American football player
- Rick Bassman (born 1961), American entrepreneur

== See Also ==
Basman (disambiguation)
