= Rabbit Keen =

American football player (1914–1984)

- Published in The Times, 1936

No. 24
- Position: Quarterback

Personal information
- Born: December 10, 1914; Stilwell, Oklahoma, U.S.
- Died: June 4, 1984 (aged 69); Overland Park, Kansas, U.S.
- Listed height: 5 ft 9 in (1.75 m)
- Listed weight: 170 lb (77 kg)

Career information
- High school: Wilson Consolidated (OK); Henryetta (OK)
- College: Connor Aggies; Arkansas
- NFL draft: 1937: undrafted

Career history

Playing
- Philadelphia Eagles (1937–1938); Richmond Arrows (1938)

Coaching
- Heavener HS (OK) (1939–?) Head coach

Career NFL statistics
- Passing attempts: 5
- Passing completions: 1
- TD–INT: 1–0
- Passing yards: 86
- Rushing yards: 164
- Rushing average: 4.4
- Stats at Pro Football Reference

Delbert Allen "Rabbit" Keen (December 10, 1914 – June 4, 1984) was an American professional football player who was a back for two seasons. A native of Oklahoma, he played college football for two years at Connors Agricultural College—now known as Connors State College—before spending two years at Arkansas. He was not selected in the 1937 NFL draft, but made the roster of the Philadelphia Eagles and appeared in eight games that year, running for 154 yards and throwing the second-longest pass of the season, an 86-yard touchdown against the Green Bay Packers which was ultimately the only completed pass of his career. He split time between the Eagles and the Richmond Arrows of the Dixie League in 1938, and did not play afterwards.

== Early life and education ==
Keen was born on December 10, 1914, in Stilwell, Oklahoma. He attended grade school in Okmulgee and later attended Wilson Consolidated High School as well as Henryetta High School. Following high school, Keen attended Connors Agricultural College in Warner, at which he was a star athlete in football, basketball and track and field, running the quarter mile, hurdles, and for the relay team. He was given an award for being the school's best athlete and was the track team captain, leading them to the state junior college championship in consecutive years. In 1935, Keen transferred to the University of Arkansas, after two years at Connors. Keen was later named to the Connors All-Time football team in 1936.

Keen saw regular action in his first year at Arkansas and was one of their best receivers, halfbacks, and their "hardest tackler." At 5 ft 9 in and 170 pounds, he was described as the "biggest little man" on the squad. He had been the leading scorer for the team, as well as one of the leaders in the conference, through November 21, with 30 points off five touchdowns, but was limited afterwards by a shoulder injury. He started "practically every game" in 1935 and at the end of the year was awarded his first varsity letter. He also earned all-conference honors.

Keen continued as a top player for Arkansas as a senior in 1936, and at the end of the year, a newspaper reported that "from his halfback post [he] has won more games for the Razorbacks than he can recall." Against the Rice University Owls that year, he scored a game-winning 60-yard punt return touchdown. He also was a member of the track and field team, captaining it in his last year, and posted a 100-yard dash time of 9.8 seconds as well as a quarter mile in 49 seconds.

== Professional career ==
Keen had initially accepted a position as a coach at an Arkansas school in 1937, but eventually changed his mind and signed with the Philadelphia Eagles of the National Football League (NFL) as an undrafted free agent. He impressed in training camp for his speed (Keen was considered the fastest member of the team, and one report described him as the fastest runner for the Eagles in their history up to that point), running ability, and blocking despite his size, leading his teammates to nickname him "Rabbit." He was the smallest in the Eagles' backfield, but was still considered one of their best blockers, with Bert Bell saying "He hits harder for his size than any man I've ever seen." Keen made the final roster, but an injury suffered in preseason resulted in him missing the first several games.

After recovering, Keen made his NFL debut in the Eagles' loss to the Cleveland Rams. In the game, he posted 12 rush attempts for 43 yards, as well as one pass attempt that fell incomplete. Through their second-to-last game, against the Brooklyn Dodgers, he had run 29 times for 122 yards, in addition to five receptions for 45 yards, and three incomplete pass attempts. In the season finale, a loss to the Green Bay Packers, Keen ran five times for 32 yards, and threw two passes, one of which was completed in the only completion of his career. The completion occurred in the fourth quarter at Wisconsin State Fair Park, and was an 86-yard touchdown pass to end Joe Carter. Through 2020, it was the 14th-longest pass ever thrown by an Eagle and the 11th-longest ever thrown against the Packers, as well as the second-longest in the NFL that season; Keen also holds the record for "longest completion in NFL history by a player who only completed one pass," according to NBC Sports.

Keen finished the season having appeared in eight of the Eagles' 11 games (in which they went 2–8–1), and posted 34 rush attempts for 154 yards, five receptions for 45 yards, and one completion on five passes for 86 yards and a touchdown. He returned to the Eagles in 1938, and initially made the team. According to one report, he was said to be the fastest player in the entire league. Soon after, he was sent to the minor league Richmond Arrows of the Dixie League. A triple-threat man, Keen appeared in five games for the Arrows, missing several due to injury, and scored two touchdowns, while passing for three more. He helped the team compile a 4–3 record, placing second in the league, and at the end of the year was voted the most valuable player in the backfield. He was also a fan favorite with the Arrows, being voted the most popular back on the team. Following the season, he signed a basketball contract with Dr. Pepper's team in the Capital City League of the Richmond Basketball Commission, playing guard. Keen did not play professional football afterwards, and finished his NFL career with 9–10 games played, 37 rushes for 164 yards, and five receptions for 45 yards, for a total of 209 all-purpose yards, in addition to 86 yards passing.

== Later life and death ==
Keen later served as head football coach and track coach at Heavener High School. He married Jean Thurkill in 1940. He died on June 4, 1984, in Overland Park, Kansas, at the age of 69.
