= Emmett Mortell =

American football player (1916–2000)

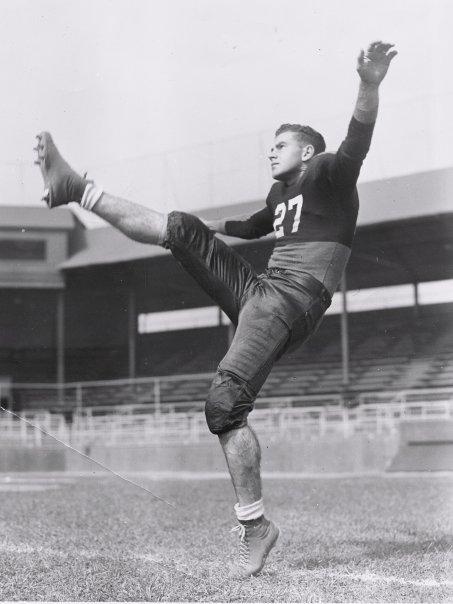
- Mortell in 1936

No. 27, 31
- Position: Tailback

Personal information
- Born: April 8, 1916; Appleton, Wisconsin
- Died: January 12, 2000 (aged 83); Warminster, Pennsylvania
- Listed height: 6 ft 1 in (1.85 m)
- Listed weight: 181 lb (82 kg)

Career information
- High school: Appleton (WI)
- College: Notre Dame; Wisconsin

Career history
- Philadelphia Eagles (1937–1939)

Career statistics
- Rushing attempts: 247
- Rushing yards: 696
- Touchdowns: 9
- Stats at Pro Football Reference

Emmett Francis Mortell (April 8, 1916 – January 12, 2000) was an American football tailback in the National Football League for the Philadelphia Eagles from 1937 to 1939. He played at the collegiate level at the University of Notre Dame and the University of Wisconsin–Madison.

== See also ==
- List of Philadelphia Eagles players
