= Fred Shirey =

American football player (1914–1961)

No. 18, 36
- Position: Tackle

Personal information
- Born: January 12, 1914; Latrobe, Pennsylvania, U.S.
- Died: November 1, 1961 (aged 47)
- Listed height: 6 ft 2 in (1.88 m)
- Listed weight: 222 lb (101 kg)

Career information
- High school: Greater Latrobe
- College: Washington & Jefferson (1932–1933); Nebraska (1934–1937)
- NFL draft: 1938: 5th round, 32nd overall pick

Career history
- Green Bay Packers (1940); Cleveland Rams (1940–1941)

Awards and highlights
- First-team All-American (1937); 3× First-team All-Big Six (1935, 1936, 1937)

Career NFL statistics
- Games played: 13
- Stats at Pro Football Reference

Charles Frederick Shirey (January 12, 1914 – November 1, 1961) was an American professional football player. He played tackle in college football for the Washington & Jefferson Presidents and Nebraska Cornhuskers. At Nebraska, he was a three-time first-team All-Big Six Conference selection and a first-team All-American as a senior in 1937. He was selected by the Philadelphia Eagles in the fifth round of the 1938 NFL draft but declined to play for them, instead becoming a high school coach and teacher. In 1940, he decided to play professionally, signing with the Green Bay Packers. He was sold mid-season to the Cleveland Rams and played two seasons with them before retiring, later working at a chemical company until his death in 1961 at age 47.

== Early life ==
Shirey was born on January 12, 1914, in Latrobe, Pennsylvania. He attended Greater Latrobe High School where he competed in football, basketball and track and field. His father was initially opposed to him playing football; it took a two-year "campaign" from Shirey, his friends and coaches for his father to allow him to try out the sport. He helped the football team compile a record of 6–2 in his last year and also set country records in the shot put and the discus throw. After high school, Shirey enrolled at Washington & Jefferson College in 1932.

== College career ==
In 1932, Shirey played freshman football for the Washington & Jefferson Presidents. A tackle, he played for the varsity team as a sophomore in 1933 and was the largest player on the team, standing at 6 feet 2 inches (1.88 m) while weighing 210 pounds (95 kg). He later met Bill Weir, a player for the Nebraska Cornhuskers who was working in Pennsylvania; in 1934, on Weir's advice, Shirey transferred to the University of Nebraska–Lincoln.

At the time, it was considered unusual for a player from as far as Pennsylvania to play for the Cornhuskers: sportswriter Wally Provost noted that "In the matter of homegrown talent, the Huskers were almost as pure as Ivory soap. Now and then you'd see an Iowan or a Kansan on the roster. But to have a player from Pennsylvania! That, indeed, was a novelty." In 1934, Shirey was starting tackle for the Nebraska freshman team. He then became a standout for the varsity team in 1935, mentored by coach Link Lyman. The Lincoln Journal Star reported that "Shirey's work in getting down under punts has made him stand out," and he had two games that season where he recovered fumbles on kicks. At the end of the season, he was named first-team All-Big Six Conference, the only sophomore selected. He helped Nebraska compile a record of 6–2–1 while winning the Big Six title.

Prior to the 1936 season, Shirey bulked up in "muscular beef" to a weight of 222 pounds (101 kg). He served as the Cornhuskers' starting left tackle during the season and repeated as an All-Big Six Conference selection while the Cornhuskers won the Big Six title. He played a final season for Nebraska in 1937, starting at tackle alongside Ted Doyle, described as his "twin", as both were born on the same day and had the same height and weight. Against the Pittsburgh Panthers in the 1937 season, Shirey served as Nebraska's team captain. Shirey received a third All-Big Six selection for the 1937 season and was also named first-team All-American; he is one of only 20 Nebraska players ever to receive three first-team all-conference honors. He also helped the Cornhuskers to another Big Six title. Shirey competed in the East–West Shrine Game at the conclusion of his collegiate career. In his three years with Nebraska varsity, he helped them win every conference game. He also competed in track for one year at Nebraska. Shirey graduated in January 1938.

== Professional career ==
Shirey participated at the 1937 Chicago Charities College All-Star Game, intercepting a pass thrown by Sammy Baugh. He was selected by the Philadelphia Eagles in the fifth round (32nd overall) of the 1938 NFL draft but did not sign with the team. Instead of joining the Eagles, he accepted a position as football, basketball and track coach at Beatrice High School, where he also worked as a teacher. He remained in these roles through 1939. In two seasons as basketball coach, he posted records of 8–14 and 7–12, respectively. Shirey resigned from Beatrice in May 1940 to sign with the Green Bay Packers, stating that they made an offer "I couldn't refuse". He appeared in three games for the Packers before being sold to the Cleveland Rams in October 1940. He played in seven games for the Rams in 1940, then returned in 1941 and appeared in three games in his final season.

== Later life and death ==
After his stint in professional football, Shirey "divorced himself entirely from the gridiron game". He worked for a chemical company in Cleveland, Ohio, and in Detroit, Michigan, for 16 years. On November 1, 1961, while working in Livonia, Michigan, he had a cerebral hemorrhage, dying later that night in a hospital at the age of 47. Shirey was posthumously inducted into the Nebraska Football Hall of Fame in 1976.
