= Ken Keller (American football) =

American football player (1934–1997)

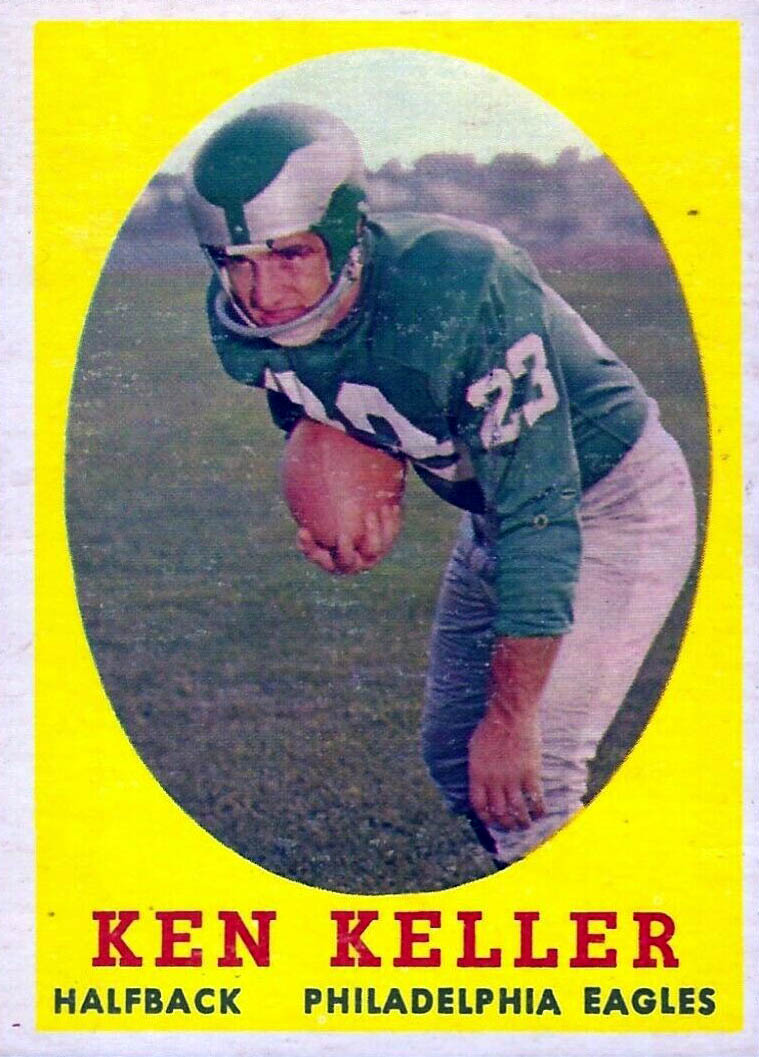

No. 23, 96
- Position: Running back

Personal information
- Born: September 12, 1934; Salina, Pennsylvania, U.S.
- Died: December 10, 1997 (aged 63); Youngstown, Ohio, U.S.
- Listed height: 5 ft 10 in (1.78 m)
- Listed weight: 180 lb (82 kg)

Career information
- College: North Carolina
- NFL draft: 1956: 11th round, 126th overall pick

Career history
- Philadelphia Eagles (1956–1957); Saskatchewan Roughriders (1959)

Career NFL statistics
- Rushing yards: 628
- Rushing average: 3.7
- Receptions: 11
- Receiving yards: 67
- Total touchdowns: 4
- Stats at Pro Football Reference

Kenneth Ray Keller (September 12, 1934 – December 10, 1997) was a professional American football running back who played in the National Football League (NFL) for two seasons. He played college football at North Carolina.

== Early life ==
Keller was born and grew up in Salina, Pennsylvania, and attended Bell Township High School, where he was part of a football team that won 28 straight games from 1948 to 1951.

== College career ==
Keller was a member of the North Carolina Tar Heels football team for four seasons. In football he played running back, defensive back, placekicker and was a return specialist. Keller led the team in total offense in 1953 and 1955 and in scoring for three straight seasons. He finished his collegiate career with over 2,000 all-purpose yards and over 100 total points scored. Keller was also a starting outfielder for the baseball team.

== Professional career ==
Keller was drafted 126th overall in the 11th round of the 1956 NFL draft by the Philadelphia Eagles. Keller served as the Eagles' starting running back as a rookie and led the team with 433 rushing yards and four rushing touchdowns. He tore ligaments in his knee in the second-to-last game of the season against the Washington Redskins. Keller rushed for 195 yards on 43 carries in a reduced role in 1957.
