= Mike Hudock =

American football player (1934–2003)

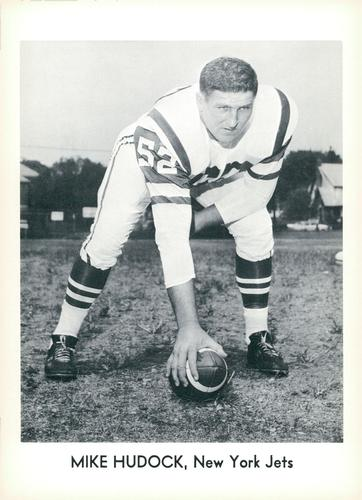
- Hudock in 1963

No. 52, 54
- Position: Center

Personal information
- Born: September 29, 1934; Pittston, Pennsylvania, U.S.
- Died: May 7, 2003 (aged 68); Scranton, Pennsylvania, U.S.
- Listed height: 6 ft 2 in (1.88 m)
- Listed weight: 245 lb (111 kg)

Career information
- High school: Tunkhannock (Tunkhannock, Pennsylvania)
- College: Miami (FL)
- NFL draft: 1956: 11th round, 128th overall pick

Career history
- Pittsburgh Steelers (1958)*; New York Titans / Jets (1960-1965); Miami Dolphins (1966); Kansas City Chiefs (1967)
- * Offseason or practice squad member only

Career AFL statistics
- Games played: 96
- Games started: 76
- Stats at Pro Football Reference

Michael Edward Hudock, Jr. (Pronounced: HOO-dock) (September 29, 1934 – May 7, 2003) was an American football center. He helped the University of Miami to become a national football power for the first time. He went played in the American Football League (AFL) as an original member of the New York Titans. He played high school football for the Tunkhannock Tigers, graduating in 1952.

== College career ==
An offensive lineman and linebacker, Hudock was a sophomore in 1954 when the Miami Hurricanes finished No. 9 in the nation, the first time they ended a season top 10. In his senior year they were 8–1–1, No. 6 in all three wire polls and Hudock was named honorable mention All-American. Hudock was twice named first-team center for the All-South team in college football and was selected to play in the Chicago Charities College All-Star Game (an injury meant that he did not play). He had begun his college career at the University of Pittsburgh before transferring to Miami.

== Professional career ==
Although his early professional years were plagued by knee injuries, Hudock became an integral part of another team's rise to prominence in 1960 when he joined the New York Titans for the first American Football League season. The Titans became the New York Jets in 1963 and in 1965 Hudock played for Joe Namath's rookie year. Taken by the Miami Dolphins in the 1966 AFL expansion draft, he retired in 1967 after he was traded to the Kansas City Chiefs.

He became an assistant high school football coach at Old Forge (Pa.), but returned to the Chiefs and played until the end of the season for their injured starting center.

== Personal life ==
Hudock later served as police chief in Tunkhannock Township, Pennsylvania.
