= Earl Witte =

American football player (1906–1991)

No. 23
- Position: Back

Personal information
- Born: December 12, 1906; St. Peter, Minnesota
- Died: November 1, 1991 (aged 84); St. Peter, Minnesota
- Listed height: 6 ft 0 in (1.83 m)
- Listed weight: 188 lb (85 kg)

Career information
- High school: St. Peter (MN)
- College: Gustavus Adolphus (1926–1930, 1933)

Career history
- Phantom Athletic Club (1931); Carlsons (1932); Ewalds (1932–1933); Green Bay Packers (1934); Philadelphia Eagles (1935)*; Ewalds (1935)
- * Offseason or practice squad member only

Career statistics
- Rushing attempts: 8
- Rushing yards: 22
- Stats at Pro Football Reference

Earl John Witte, sometimes spelled Witty (December 12, 1906 – November 1, 1991) was an American football back. He played college football for the Gustavus Adolphus Golden Gusties and later was a member of the Green Bay Packers of the National Football League (NFL). He also played with the Phantom Athletic Club, the Carlsons and the Ewalds, in local ranks, as well as had a brief stint with the Philadelphia Eagles.

== Early life and football career ==
Witte was born on December 12, 1906, in St. Peter, Minnesota. He attended St. Peter High School and is one of only three of their alumni to ever make it to the NFL. As a senior in 1925, he averaged over 12 yards-per-carry and ran for 1,719 yards in eight games. He was described as "one of the sensations of the southern Minnesota high schools." Witte also played several other sports at St. Peter. He entered Gustavus Adolphus College in 1926.

Witte was on the freshman football team his first year and also played guard for their basketball squad. He made the varsity and saw significant playing time at fullback in 1927; he led the conference in scoring with seven touchdowns and helped Gustavus Adolphus win the circuit title, for which he was selected first-team all-conference. He was also selected second-team all-state. Halsey Hall of The Minneapolis Journal, in selecting Witte second-team all-state, noted that he was a "touchdown maker de luxe and the defensive genius of the Gustie backs. Witt[e] ... could be on the first team without anybody feeling hurt about it."

Witte also played for the 1927–28 Gustavus Adolphus basketball team and helped them win the state championship, additionally being selected to the all-state basketball team. He was ruled ineligible to play in the 1928 football season. He was able to return for the 1929 season and became one of the top players for the team; through games played by October 23, he was 15 points ahead for the conference scoring lead with 39, and it was reported by The Minneapolis Star that "his hard-hitting thrusts when scoring yardage is needed [and is] mainly responsible for the Gusties' return to state college gridiron prominence." He finished the season having scored 52 points–48 off eight touchdowns and four off extra points–which tied the all-time conference scoring record. He was named second-team all-state for his performance. He also continued playing basketball and earned a second all-state selection.

Witte was able to return for his fifth year in 1930 and earned first-team all-state as well as first-team all-conference honors. It was noted in an article from The Minneapolis Journal that, "[a]t fullback is Earl Witt[e], the Kid from Gustavus who ranted and raved and dashed around a football field. The kid was afire in a football game and, if he was stopped for the first half, he came back like judgement day in the second. He was strong on the defensive and one of the sparks of the Gustie array."

Witte began playing for the Phantom Athletic Club of the local Park Football League and began the season as their quarterback, later shifting to be their starting fullback; he was one of four players in the team's backfield known as the "Four Galloping Ghosts." After the football season, he joined the American Legion basketball team in the Minneapolis AAU League and played the 1931–32 season with them. In the 1932 football season, he played for a team known as the Carlsons before leaving late-season to join the Ewalds.

Witte played the first two games of 1933 with the Ewalds but then made a decision to return to college for one final football season with Gustavus Adolphus. He reportedly played "better than ever" that season and was named a first-team all-conference and all-state selection. Afterwards, he re-joined the Ewalds and played the end of the year with them.

In August 1934, Witte was signed by the Green Bay Packers of the National Football League (NFL). He made the team and appeared in five of the Packers' 13 games, two as a starter, helping them compile a record of 7–6. He played as a blocking back and defensive back and had a total of eight rush attempts for 22 yards, averaging 2.8 yards-per-carry while wearing the number 23. After an exhibition game against the Chicago Bears, the Green Bay Press-Gazette noted that he "wanted to prove that [Bronko] Nagurski and [Jack] Manders were not the only Minnesotans on the field last night, and he did it quite proficiently. One time when the Bronc busted through the Packer line on one of his bone-crushing plunges, Witte came up fast from the secondary and picked the Bronc right up in the air while he was driving forward and threw him on his back." He also reportedly hit Gene Ronzani so hard that Ronzani "stopped, curled up and dropped to the ground as if he had hit a stone wall."

Witte was sold along with Carl Jorgensen to the Philadelphia Eagles in May 1935. He ultimately did not play for the Eagles. He instead returned to the Ewalds football team that season and played the year with them.

== Later life and death ==
After retiring from football, Witte served for the State of Minnesota public welfare department for 30 years until retiring in 1971. He also served in the United States Navy during World War II for three years. He died on November 1, 1991, in St. Peter, Minnesota, at the age of 84.
