= Jack Davis (guard, born 1933) =

American football player and coach (1933–2015)

No. 62
- Position: Guard

Personal information
- Born: February 19, 1933; Heavener, Oklahoma, U.S.
- Died: February 15, 2015 (aged 81); Poteau, Oklahoma, U.S.
- Listed height: 6 ft 2 in (1.88 m)
- Listed weight: 235 lb (107 kg)

Career information
- High school: Heavener (OK)
- College: Arizona
- NFL draft: 1958: 15th round, 174th overall pick

Career history

Playing
- Washington Redskins (1958)*; Tucson Rattlers (1958); Denver Broncos (1960)
- * Offseason or practice squad member only

Coaching
- Page High School (1959) (HC); Coolidge High School (1960) (HC); Imperial High School (1961–1963) (HC); Central Union High School (1964) (HC); Hueneme High School (1965–1973) (HC); Apache Junction High School (1974–1975) (HC); Oxnard High School (1979–1992) (HC)
- Stats at Pro Football Reference

Jack Owen Davis (February 19, 1933 – February 15, 2015) was an American professional football guard who played one season with the Denver Broncos of the American Football League (AFL). He was selected by the Washington Redskins of the National Football League (NFL) in the fifteenth round of the 1958 NFL draft. He first enrolled at the University of Oklahoma before transferring to the University of Arizona. Davis attended Heavener High School in Heavener, Oklahoma.

== Early life ==
Davis played high school football for the Heavener High School Wolves. He was a three-year varsity letterman and team captain for the Wolves. He earned All-League honors his junior and senior seasons. Davis was also a four-year varsity letterman in baseball and a two-year varsity letterman in basketball.

== College career ==
Davis first played college football from 1951 to 1952 for the Oklahoma Sooners of the University of Oklahoma. He served in the United States Marine Corps from 1953 to 1955 where he also played football in San Diego and Camp Pendleton.

Upon his honorable discharge from the Marines, Davis was a three-year varsity letterman for the Arizona Wildcats of the University of Arizona. He was also a team captain for the Wildcats and played in the 1957 All-American All-Star game. He received his Masters of Education from the University of Arizona in 1959.

== Professional career ==
Davis was selected by the Washington Redskins of the NFL with the 174th overall pick of the 1958 NFL draft and was released by the team before the start of the 1958 season. He played for the Tucson Rattlers of the Pacific Football Conference in 1958. He played in two games for the AFL's Denver Broncos in 1960.

== Coaching career ==
Davis was head coach of Page High School in 1959, finishing the season with a 9–1 record. He then had stints as head coach of Coolidge High School in Coolidge, Arizona in 1960, Imperial High School in Imperial, California from 1961 to 1963 and Central Union High School in El Centro, California in 1964. He won two league championship in Imperial, California.

Davis then served as head coach of Hueneme High School in Oxnard, California from 1965 to 1973 and set a school record for wins with a 43–34–4 record. He was head coach of Apache Junction High School in Apache Junction, Arizona from 1974 to 1975 and won a state championship. He was later head coach of Oxnard High School in Oxnard, California from 1979 to 1992 and established a school record for wins with a 92–53–3 record. Davis also set a record for most years coached in the Channel League with 21.

He chosen by the CIF and United Savings-Helms Athletic Foundation as an assistant coach in 1971 and as head coach in 1972 of the California Prep All-Stars that beat the Hawaii Prep All-Stars in the Aloha Senior Football Classic. He also coached the West team in the 1987 Ventura County All-Star game.

Davis was inducted into the Ventura County Sports Hall of Fame in 1995.

== Personal life ==
Davis organized the first booster club in the Oxnard Union High School District. He also helped organize the first Youth Football program in Oxnard and was facility director for the Oxnard annual 4th of July fireworks show for eight years. He received the Oxnard Union High School District superintendent Most Inspirational Employees Service Award in 1989.

He went missing from his home on February 9, 2015. His body was found in a ravine on February 15, 2015.
