= Koda Glover =

American baseball player (born 1993)

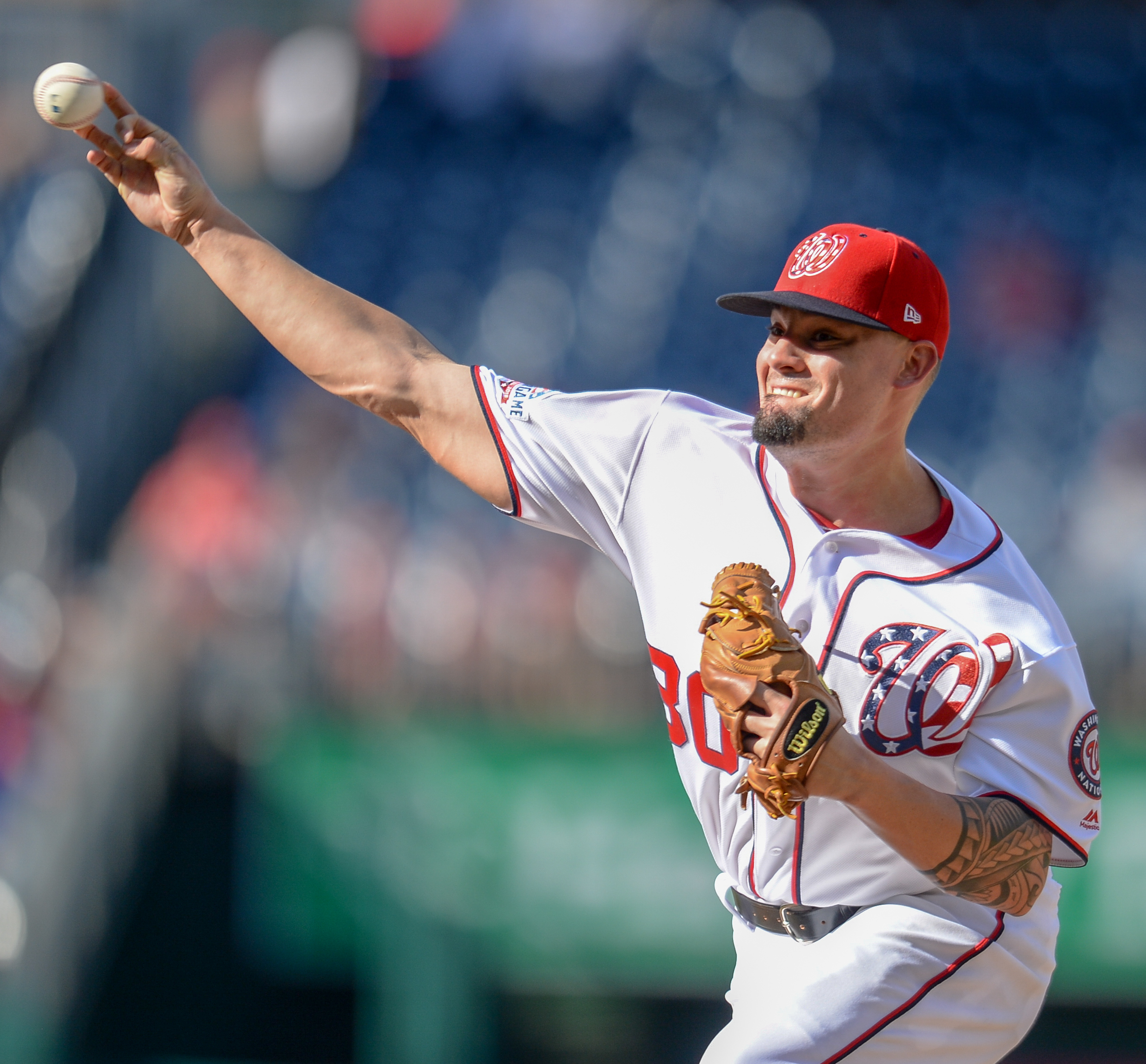
- Glover with the Washington Nationals in 2018
- Relief pitcher
- Born: April 13, 1993 (age 33); Monroe, Oklahoma, U.S.
- Batted: Right Threw: Right

MLB debut
- July 20, 2016, for the Washington Nationals

Last MLB appearance
- September 29, 2018, for the Washington Nationals

MLB statistics
- Win–loss record: 3–4
- Earned run average: 4.55
- Strikeouts: 42
- Stats at Baseball Reference

Teams
- Washington Nationals (2016–2018)

Koda James Glover (born April 13, 1993) is an American former professional baseball pitcher. He played in Major League Baseball (MLB) for the Washington Nationals.

== Early life and career ==
Glover was born in Monroe, Oklahoma, to Ray and Bobbi Jo Glover. He is of Cherokee and Sioux descent. He graduated from Heavener High School in Heavener, Oklahoma.

He was a four-time all-conference pick and two-time conference player of the year, posting a 28–4 win–loss record with over 300 strikeouts. During his senior year, he had an 11–0 record with a 1.69 earned run average (ERA) and 114 strikeouts. He also was an all-conference and all-county basketball player in high school.

Glover played college baseball at Eastern Oklahoma State College and Oklahoma State University and underwent Tommy John surgery.

== Professional career ==
=== Minor leagues ===
A career relief pitcher, Glover was selected by the Washington Nationals in the eighth round of the 2015 Major League Baseball draft specifically to pitch in relief. He made his professional debut that year with the Auburn Doubledays and was promoted to the Hagerstown Suns after three games.

Glover started 2016 with the Potomac Nationals and was promoted to the Harrisburg Senators after not giving up a run in seven games. As the 2016 season progressed, Glover was promoted to play with the Syracuse Chiefs. Prior to his major-league debut, Glover averaged 10.8 strikeouts per nine innings pitched over the course of his minor-league career, and during 2016 he pitched 45 1/3 innings in the minors before being called up to play with the Washington Nationals, amassing a won-loss record of 3–0 with six saves, a 2.18 ERA, 52 strikeouts, and 14 walks.

=== Major leagues ===
Glover made his major-league debut with the Nationals on July 20, 2016, as one of the fastest-rising draft picks in Nationals history and the first member of the Nationals' 2013, 2014, 2015, or 2016 draft classes to reach the majors. Entering the game to pitch the bottom of the ninth inning, he retired all three batters he faced on just four pitches to complete an 8–1 win over the Los Angeles Dodgers. All four pitches were strikes, and at least two of them were 98-mph (158-km/h) fastballs. Glover suffered a torn hip labrum midway through his time with the major league team, which he attempted to pitch through until disclosing the injury to pitching coach Mike Maddux after giving up a home run on September 26, 2016, at which point he was shut down for the season.

Glover wore #32 in his first season in the major leagues. However, after the Nationals signed Matt Wieters to play catcher for the 2017 season, he voluntarily switched his number to #30 to allow Wieters to continue wearing the #32 he had worn with the Baltimore Orioles. In the early days of the 2017 season, Glover's left hip trouble recurred, and he was placed on the 10-day disabled list with what the Nationals described as a left hip impingement on April 26. The stint was short-lived, as he was activated on May 12. Manager Dusty Baker said he would share closing duties with Shawn Kelley after Opening Day closer Blake Treinen was removed from the role, although Kelley was reportedly to take on primary closing duties, with Glover filling in when he was unavailable.

The Nationals' bullpen struggled over the first quarter of the 2017 season, marked by Treinen's travails in and eventual demotion from the role of closer in April and Kelley subsequently disappointing in the job as his home run and walk rates spiked. By late May, the role fell to Glover, with Baker describing him as the team's "most durable" option despite his earlier time on the disabled list and hip injury the previous season. "We're willing to give it to him as long as he keeps doing the job," said Baker. Glover's improved slider drew national media attention after he struck out Hunter Renfroe to finish off the San Diego Padres with a 96-mph pitch breaking sharply down and away from the batter, the hardest such pitch thrown for a swinging strike all season. He notched four saves in five days toward the end of May while forming a back-end tandem with veteran setup man Matt Albers.

Glover was placed on the disabled list on June 11 for the second time in the 2017 season with back stiffness after a blown save. While Glover initially said he had injured his back while showering, he later amended his story, admitting he had been trying to pitch through right shoulder pain since late May and that an MRI showed severe inflammation of his rotator cuff, pain from which he blamed for "overcompensation" that he said led to a vertebra moving out of place when he slipped in the shower. Glover was shut down from his rehabilitation in West Palm Beach in September after experiencing a setback.

After starting the 2018 season on the disabled list after experiencing discomfort and being shut down with another bout of shoulder inflammation early in spring training, Glover rehabbed with the GCL Nationals and Syracuse Chiefs before being activated and optioned to Syracuse on July 22, 2018. Glover missed the entire 2019 season due to forearm and elbow pain.

Glover announced his retirement from baseball on December 2, 2019.

== Pitching style ==
Glover employed a four-pitch arsenal, with his fastball velocity topping out in the high 90s, a hard slider (which he sometimes described as a cutter) that often reached the mid-90s, and a changeup and curveball he threw less frequently. Retired baseball scout Bernie Pleskoff, writing of Glover in 2017, described him as having "a mound demeanor that exudes confidence and no-nonsense".

== Personal ==
In January 2020, Glover was named head coach of the Howe High School baseball team.
