= Glenn Frey (American football) =

American football player (1912–1980)

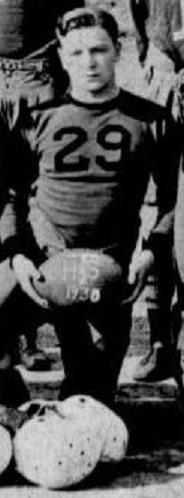
- Frey as a senior football captain at Tunkhannock High School in 1930

No. 32
- Position: Quarterback

Personal information
- Born: March 6, 1912; Tunkhannock, Pennsylvania, U.S.
- Died: January 5, 1980 (aged 67); New Port Richey, Florida, U.S.

Career information
- College: Temple

Career history
- Philadelphia Eagles (1936–1937)

Career statistics
- Rushing yards: 19

Glenn Joseph Frey (March 6, 1912 – January 5, 1980) was an American football quarterback and running back in the National Football League. He played college football for the Temple Owls and coach Pop Warner and then played professional football with the Philadelphia Eagles.

== Early life and education ==
He graduated from Tunkhannock Area High School in Tunkhannock, Pennsylvania in 1931.

Frey attended Temple University in Philadelphia, where he played football for the Temple Owls and played for Temple in the first Sugar Bowl at Tulane Stadium in New Orleans on January 1, 1935 against the Tulane Green Wave, in front of 22,206 fans. They lost the game, 20-14.

== Professional football ==
Frey played for the Philadelphia Eagles in the team's 1936 and 1937 seasons.
