= Wagner Jorgensen =

American football player (1913–1977)

No. 18
- Positions: Center, linebacker

Personal information
- Born: July 31, 1913; Denmark
- Died: July 24, 1977 (aged 63); San Mateo, California, U.S.
- Listed height: 6 ft 2 in (1.88 m)
- Listed weight: 215 lb (98 kg)

Career information
- High school: San Mateo (San Mateo, California, U.S.)
- College: Saint Mary's (CA) (1932–1935)
- NFL draft: 1936: 3rd round, 22nd overall pick

Career history
- Brooklyn Dodgers (1936–1937)

Career NFL statistics
- Games played: 18
- Stats at Pro Football Reference

Wagner O. Jorgensen (July 31, 1913 – July 24, 1977) was a Danish professional American football center who played two seasons with the Brooklyn Dodgers of the National Football League (NFL). He was selected by the Dodgers in the third round of the 1936 NFL draft after playing college football at Saint Mary's College of California.

== Early life and college ==
Wagner O. Jorgensen was born on July 31, 1913, in Denmark. He attended San Mateo High School in San Mateo, California.

Jorgensen played college football for the Saint Mary's Gaels of Saint Mary's College of California. He was on the freshman team in 1932 and a member of the main roster from 1933 to 1935. He graduated in 1936. Jorgensen was inducted into the Saint Mary's College Athletic Hall of Fame in 1976.

== Professional career ==
Jorgensen was selected by the Brooklyn Dodgers in the third round, with the 22nd overall pick, of the 1936 NFL draft. He played in eight games for the Dodgers in 1936. He appeared in ten games, starting six, for Brooklyn during the 1937 season.

== Personal life ==
Jorgensen served in the United States Navy. His brother Carl Jorgensen also played in the NFL. He died on July 24, 1977, in San Mateo, California.
