= Max Fiske (American football) =

American football player (1913–1973)

Profile
- Position: Quarterback

Personal information
- Born: September 27, 1913; Chicago, Illinois, U.S.
- Died: March 15, 1973 (aged 59); Chicago, Illinois, U.S.
- Listed height: 6 ft 0 in (1.83 m)
- Listed weight: 199 lb (90 kg)

Career information
- High school: Pullman Tech
- College: DePaul University

Career history
- 1936–1939: Pittsburgh Pirates

Career statistics
- Passing yards: 503
- Pass attempts: 95
- Pass completions: 34
- TD–INT: 4–11
- Games played: 29
- Rushing yards: 219

Max Joseph Fiske (September 27, 1913 – March 15, 1973) was an American football player for the Pittsburgh Pirates, now the Pittsburgh Steelers.

In 1977, he was inducted into the Roseland Pullman Sports Hall of Fame.
