= Baseman =

Baseman may refer to:

== Sports ==
- In baseball, the term baseman can refer to the following positions:
  - First baseman
  - Second baseman
  - Third baseman

== People with the surname ==
- Gary Baseman (born 1960), American artist
