= Bill Breeden =

American football player (1913–1982)

No. 44
- Position: Back

Personal information
- Born: November 7, 1913; Haskell, Texas, U.S.
- Died: December 16, 1982 (aged 69); Dallas, Texas, U.S.
- Listed height: 6 ft 1 in (1.85 m)
- Listed weight: 210 lb (95 kg)

Career information
- High school: Central (Oklahoma City, Oklahoma)
- College: Oklahoma (1933-1936)
- NFL draft: 1937: 3rd round, 25th overall pick

Career history
- Pittsburgh Pirates (1937)

Awards and highlights
- 2× Second-team All-Big Six (1935, 1936)

Career NFL statistics
- Rushing yards: 25
- Rushing average: 2.5
- Receptions: 6
- Receiving yards: 59
- Stats at Pro Football Reference

John William Breeden (November 7, 1913 – December 16, 1982) was an American professional football player who played one season with the Pittsburgh Pirates of the National Football League (NFL). He was selected in the third round of the 1937 NFL draft with the 25th overall pick. He played college football at the University of Oklahoma.
