= James Austin (American football) =

American football player (1913–1995)

No. 19, 29
- Position: End

Personal information
- Born: August 11, 1913
- Died: December 8, 1995 (aged 82)
- Listed height: 6 ft 2 in (1.88 m)
- Listed weight: 199 lb (90 kg)

Career information
- High school: Hollywood (CA)
- College: Saint Mary's (CA)

Career history
- Brooklyn Dodgers (1937–1938); Detroit Lions (1939)

Career NFL statistics
- Games played: 28
- Receptions: 32
- Receiving Yards: 467
- Receiving TDs: 1
- Stats at Pro Football Reference

James Lawrence Austin (August 11, 1913 – December 8, 1995) was an American professional football player who player for the Brooklyn Dodgers and Detroit Lions of the National Football League from 1937 to 1939.
