= Les McDonald =

American football player (1914–1971)

No. 76
- Position: End

Personal information
- Born: September 19, 1914; Grand Island, Nebraska, U.S.
- Died: July 26, 1971 (aged 56); Grand Island, Nebraska, U.S.
- Listed height: 6 ft 4 in (1.93 m)
- Listed weight: 200 lb (91 kg)

Career information
- High school: Grand Island
- College: Nebraska (1933-1936)
- NFL draft: 1937: 1st round, 8th overall pick

Career history
- Chicago Bears (1937–1939); Philadelphia Eagles (1940); Detroit Lions (1940)

Awards and highlights
- First-team All-Big Six (1936); Second-team All-Big Six (1935)

Career NFL statistics
- Receptions: 51
- Receiving yards: 924
- Receiving touchdowns: 8
- Stats at Pro Football Reference

Lester Bruce McDonald (September 19, 1914 – July 26, 1971) was an American professional football end in the National Football League (NFL) for the Chicago Bears, Detroit Lions, and Philadelphia Eagles. He played college football at the University of Nebraska and was selected in the first round with the eighth overall pick of the 1937 NFL draft.
