= Tunkhannock Area High School =

Location
- 135 Tiger Street; Tunkhannock, Pennsylvania 18657; United States
- Coordinates: 41°32′41″N 75°57′33″W

Information
- School type: Public
- School district: Tunkhannock Area School District
- Principal: Brittany Wood
- Teaching staff: 64.85 (FTE)
- Enrollment: 845 (2023–2024)
- Student to teacher ratio: 13.03
- Campus type: Town: Fringe
- Colors: Orange; Black; White
- Team name: Tigers
- Website: www.tasd.net/high-school
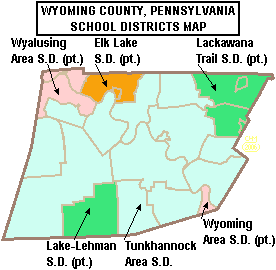

Tunkhannock Area High School lies in the valley of the Endless Mountains. The school in Tunkhannock in Wyoming County, Pennsylvania, United States. It is the sole high school operated by the Tunkhannock Area School District. Enrollment was 890 for the 2022–23 school year.

Tunkhannock Area High School students may choose to attend Susquehanna County Career and Technology Center for training in the construction and mechanical trades, cosmetology, Food Management and other careers. The Luzerne Intermediate Unit IU18 provides the school with a wide variety of services like specialized education for disabled students and hearing, speech and visual disability services and professional development for staff and faculty.

== Music program ==
The music program at Tunkhannock High School allows students to develop into the study and performance of music through instruments and singing. The music program is highly respected, and one of the best in surrounding counties. As recorded in 2018-2019 school year 3/4 of the school district participate in the music department.

Courses offered:

- Marching/Concert Band
- Music Theory and Composition
- Jazz Ensemble 1
- Jazz Ensemble 2
- Jazz Ensemble 3
- String Ensemble
- Mixed Chorus
- Advance Vocal Class
- Women's Chorus
- Piano Class
- Percussion

After School Courses

- PMEA Band, Chorus, Jazz, and Orchestra
- Select Choir
- Men's Choir
- Women's Choir

== School to career opportunities ==
This program is available to all students that would like to experience the work force while still in high school. Students may also work in or job shadow several a variety of careers to help them decide their future plans. Some of the opportunities that students may take part in are Cooperative Vocational Education, Internship Program, Job Shadowing Summer Tech Prep Co-op Program, Skills VSA/VICA, and Transitional Job Shadowing/Job Training.

== Extracurriculars ==
Tunkhannock Area School District offers a variety of clubs, activities and an extensive sports program in association with the Pennsylvania Interscholastic Athletic Association (PIAA).

=== Athletics ===
The school provides:

Varsity

Boys

- Baseball - AAA
- Basketball- AAA
- Cross country - AA
- Football - AAA
- Golf - AAA
- Lacrosse - AAAA
- Soccer - AA
- Swimming and diving - AA
- Tennis - AA
- Track and field - AAA
- Volleyball - AA
- Water Polo - AA
- Wrestling - AAA

Girls

- Basketball - AAA
- Cheerleading - AAAA
- Cross country - AA
- Field hockey - AA
- Golf - AAA
- Lacrosse - AAAA
- Soccer - AA
- Softball - AAA
- Swimming and diving - AA
- Tennis - AA
- Track and field - AAA
- Volleyball - AA

According to PIAA directory 2014–15, July 2014

In the fall of 2009, the Tunkhannock Area boys' cross-country team won the district II PIAA Championship and then went on to compete in state meet in Hershey, Pennsylvania. In June 2010, the Tunkhannock Area baseball team were crowned District II AAA Champions. The team advanced to the quarterfinals of the state playoff before being defeated by Conrad-Weiser. In June 2011, the Tunkhannock Area baseball team advanced to the AAA State Championship for the first time in school history. In May 2013, the Tunkhannock Area boys' track and field team won the District II PIAA Championship for the first time in school history.

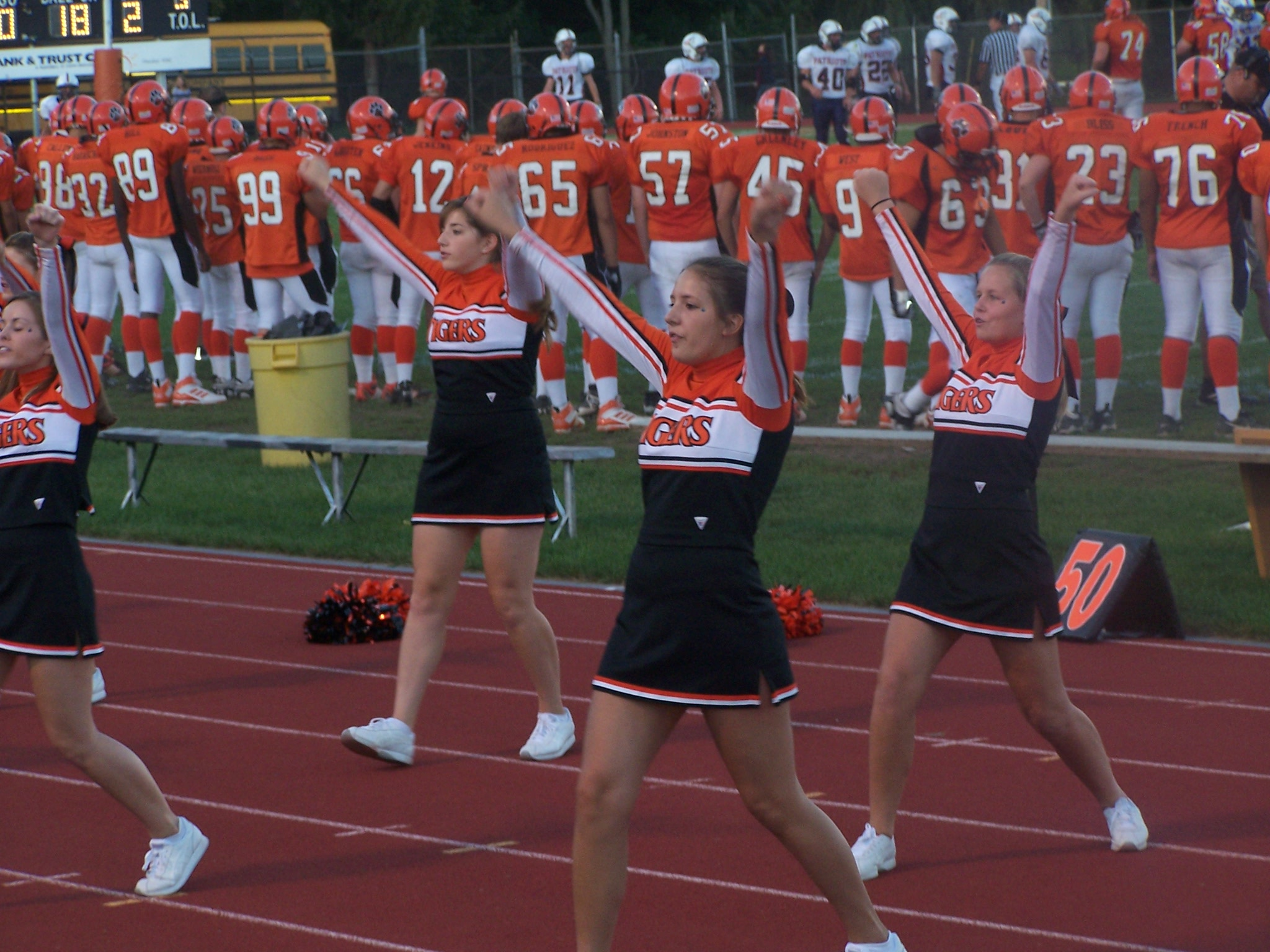

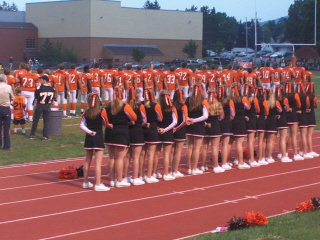

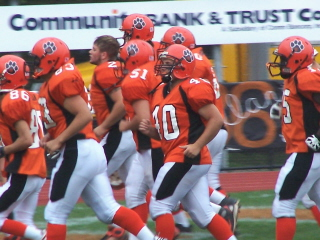

== Notable alumni ==
- Mike Hudock – American football player (1934–2003)
