= Jeff Barrett =

American football player (1913–1970)

Profile
- Position: End

Personal information
- Born: February 8, 1913; San Antonio, Texas
- Died: February 15, 1970 (aged 57); Corpus Christi, Texas

Career information
- College: Louisiana State University

Career history
- 1936–1938: Brooklyn Dodgers

Warren Jefferson "Jeff" Barrett (1913–1970) was an American football end.

Barrett was born in 1913 in San Antonio, Texas. He attended John H. Reagan High School in Houston and then enrolled at Louisiana State University. He played college football for the LSU Tigers football team from 1932 to 1935. He was captain of the 1935 LSU Tigers football team that won the SEC championship. He caught the game-winning touchdown pass in the closing minutes of the Tigers' 1935 victory over Auburn. He was rated as "one of the best all-around ends" the South ever saw, "quick and elusive" as a pass receiver, an "outstanding defensive player and a great blocker."

Barrett also played professional football as an end for the Brooklyn Dodgers. Over three seasons from 1936 to 1938, he appeared in 34 NFL games, 16 as a starter. Rated as "the best pass catcher" on the Dodgers team, he caught 47 passes for 934 yards, and scored 6 touchdowns.

Barrett died in 1970 at Corpus Christi, Texas.
