= Herschel Stockton =

American football player (1913–1965)

Mule Stockton

Profile
- Positions: Guard, tackle

Personal information
- Born: December 29, 1913; Abilene, Texas, U.S.
- Died: November 12, 1965 (Age 51); Odessa, Texas, U.S.
- Listed height: 6 ft 1 in (1.85 m)
- Listed weight: 218 lb (99 kg)

Career information
- College: McMurry (1934-1936)

Career history
- Philadelphia Eagles (1937-1938)

Career statistics
- Games played: 22
- Starts: 19

Willis Herschel "Mule" Stockton (December 29, 1913 – November 12, 1965) was an American football player. A college star at McMurry College, Stockton played on the line for two years for the Philadelphia Eagles of the National Football League (NFL).

== Biography ==
Stockton was born in 1913 in Abilene, Texas, and attended Crosbyton High School. He then enrolled at McMurry College (now known as McMurry University) in Abilene where he played college football at the tackle position for that McMurry Indians football teams of 1934, 1935, and 1936. He also competed in baseball and track and field at McMurry.

Stockton also played professional football in the National Football League (NFL) as a guard for the Philadelphia Eagles during their 1937 and 1938 seasons. The Eagles converted him from a tackle to a guard. He played in 22 games for the Eagles, 19 of them as a starter.

After his playing career ended, Stockton was an assistant football coach at Big Spring, Texas, from 1939 to 1948. During World War II, he entered the Army in 1942, held the rank of sergeant, served overseas for 18 months with the Third Armored Division, and was wounded in Europe. He became head football coach at Big Spring High School in February 1948.

In 1949, he became a physical education teacher and football coach at Lee Junior High School in San Angelo, Texas. He was married to Vivian Peek, and they a daughter. He died in 1965 of a heart attack while attending a high school football game at Odessa, Texas.

On November 12, 1965, while watching a high school football game, Stockton collapsed from a heart attack and died. He was 51 years old at the time of his death.

Stockton was posthumously elected to the McMurry Hall of Fame in 1984.
