= Salina, Pennsylvania =

Unincorporated community in Pennsylvania, US

Salina
- Unincorporated community
- Location within the U.S. state of Pennsylvania Salina (the United States)
- Coordinates: 40°31′18″N 79°29′53″W
- Country: United States
- State: Pennsylvania
- County: Westmoreland
- Time zone: UTC-5 (Eastern (EST))
  - Summer (DST): UTC-4 (EDT)
- ZIP code: 15680

Salina is an unincorporated community in northern Westmoreland County, Pennsylvania, United States. Located near Route 819, it lies near communities such as Tinsmill and Avonmore. Salina also is located near Kiski Area School District's elementary school, Bell-Avon.

== History ==
Salina was constructed by the Kier Firebrick Company to house employees of the firm. The houses were constructed from 1900 to 1915. It had one clay mine and two coal mines. It was located on a main route (SR 981) connecting Saltsburg to Apollo that has since been re-routed.

The town once had two general stores, hospital, hotel, church, brick factory, bowling alley, post office, barber shop, lumber yard and high school. The church was lost due to mine subsidence. The high school was transformed into an elementary school and later sold for storage. DeForno's general store was removed to create a parking for a local business. Beatty’s general store is now apartments. The hospital is now a home. The brick factory was removed and all that remains is a large cement pad near the railroad tracks. The hotel is still in operation as a restaurant and bar (Salina Inn). The bowling alley is now Bell Township VFD.

Salina is located along the Kiskiminetas River, a tributary of the Allegheny River. The Pennsylvania Main Line Canal was completed through this location in 1831, allowing commercial travel from Pittsburgh to Johnstown.

Along the Kiskiminetas, wells were drilled for salt brine which was used to make salt, hence the name "Salina".

By the mid-1850s, the Pennsylvania Railroad came through, bringing new access to markets for local industry.
