= Bob Gonya =

American football player

No. 27
- Position: Offensive tackle

Personal information
- Born: June 15, 1910; Chicago, Illinois, U.S.
- Died: January 15, 1999 (aged 88); Tempe, Arizona, U.S.
- Listed height: 6 ft 2 in (1.88 m)
- Listed weight: 208 lb (94 kg)

Career information
- High school: Mount Carmel (Chicago, Illinois)
- College: Northwestern

Career history
- Philadelphia Eagles (1933–1934)

Career statistics
- Games played: 11
- Games started: 2
- Receiving touchdowns: 1
- Stats at Pro Football Reference

Robert James Gonya (June 15, 1910 – January 15, 1999) was an American football offensive tackle who played in the National Football League (NFL). He played for two seasons with the Philadelphia Eagles from 1933–1934. He played college football at Northwestern.

== Professional career ==
=== Philadelphia Eagles ===
In 1934, Gonya caught a four-yard touchdown pass from Dan Barnhardt against the Pittsburgh Pirates. Gonya was the only offensive lineman in Philadelphia Eagles history to catch a touchdown pass until 74 years later when Todd Herremans caught a one-yard touchdown pass from Donovan McNabb in 2008 against the Seattle Seahawks. Herremans caught another touchdown pass in 2010.
