= Philadelphia Eagles all-time roster =

The Philadelphia Eagles all-time roster is split by name into the following two lists:

- Philadelphia Eagles all-time roster (A–Ke)
- Philadelphia Eagles all-time roster (Kh–Z)
