= John Klumb =

American football player (1916–1998)

No. 81, 56, 3, 22
- Position: End

Personal information
- Born: January 22, 1916; Aurora, Nebraska, U.S.
- Died: July 23, 1998 (aged 82); Sacramento, California, U.S.
- Listed height: 6 ft 3 in (1.91 m)
- Listed weight: 200 lb (91 kg)

Career information
- High school: Stadium (Tacoma, Washington)
- College: Washington State

Career history
- Cincinnati Bengals (1939); Chicago Cardinals (1939–1940); Pittsburgh Steelers (1940)
- Stats at Pro Football Reference

John James Klumb (January 22, 1916 – July 23, 1998) was an American football end who played for two seasons in the National Football League (NFL). After playing college football for Washington State, he played for the Cincinnati Bengals of the American Professional Football Association (APFA) in 1939. He played for the Chicago Cardinals of the NFL from 1939 to 1940, and for the Pittsburgh Steelers in 1940.
