= Lindy Mayhew =

American football player (1907–1990)

- Mayhew, circa 1936

No. 40
- Positions: Guard, tackle

Personal information
- Born: August 24, 1907; Lafayette County, Mississippi, U.S.
- Died: February 21, 1990 (aged 82); Polk County, Florida, U.S.
- Listed height: 6 ft 1 in (1.85 m)
- Listed weight: 223 lb (101 kg)

Career information
- College: Texas Mines

Career history
- Pittsburgh Pirates (1936–1938)
- Stats at Pro Football Reference

Hayden Lowe "Lindy" Mayhew (August 24, 1907 – February 21, 1990) was an American professional football player for the Pittsburgh Pirates of the National Football League (NFL). He played college football for the Texas Mines Miners.

== Early life ==
Hayden Lowe Mayhew was born on August 24, 1907, in Lafayette County, Mississippi.

== College career ==
Mayhew played junior college football at Weatherford College in 1928. He later enrolled at the College of Mines and Metallurgy of the University of Texas, where he was a four-year varsity letterman for the Miners from 1930 to 1933.

== Professional career ==
Mayhew played in 27 of 34 games, starting 11, for the Pittsburgh Pirates of the National Football League from 1936 to 1938 as a guard/tackle. He scored a safety in 1937. He was released on October 14, 1938.

== Personal life ==
On December 17, 1936, while still a member of the Pirates, he was hired to work in the sporting goods department of the Popular Dry Goods Company in El Paso, Texas. He died on February 21, 1990, in Polk County, Florida.
