= Tuffy Thompson =

American football player (1914–2000)

No. 27, 50
- Position: Halfback

Personal information
- Born: September 28, 1914; Montevideo, Minnesota, U.S.
- Died: February 5, 2000 (aged 85); Jacksonville, Florida, U.S.
- Listed height: 5 ft 11 in (1.80 m)
- Listed weight: 172 lb (78 kg)

Career information
- College: Minnesota

Career history
- Pittsburgh Pirates (1937–1938); Green Bay Packers (1939)

Awards and highlights
- NFL champion (1939); 2× National champion (1935, 1936)

Career statistics
- Rushing attempts: 88
- Rushing yards: 228
- Receptions: 16
- Passing attempts: 21
- Completions: 6
- Touchdowns: 2
- Td-Int: 1-7
- Stats at Pro Football Reference

Clarence Leonard "Tuffy" Thompson (September 28, 1914 – February 5, 2000) was a halfback who played in the National Football League (NFL). He played two seasons with the Pittsburgh Pirates before becoming a member of the Green Bay Packers during his final season.
