= Sam Francis (American football) =

American football player and coach, shot putter (1913-2002)

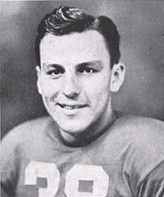
- Francis in 1936

No. 38, 50, 10
- Positions: Halfback, fullback

Personal information
- Born: October 26, 1913; Dunbar, Nebraska, U.S.
- Died: April 23, 2002 (aged 88); Springfield, Missouri, U.S.
- Listed height: 6 ft 0 in (1.83 m)
- Listed weight: 207 lb (94 kg)

Career information
- High school: Decatur County (Oberlin, Kansas)
- College: Nebraska
- NFL draft: 1937: 1st round, 1st overall pick

Career history

Playing
- Philadelphia Eagles (1937)*; Chicago Bears (1937–1938); Pittsburgh Pirates (1939); Brooklyn Dodgers (1939–1940)
- * Offseason or practice squad member only

Coaching
- Kansas State (1947) Head coach

Awards and highlights
- Unanimous All-American (1936); 2× First-team All-MVIAA (1935, 1936)

Career NFL statistics
- Rushing yards: 873
- Rushing average: 3.5
- Rushing touchdowns: 5
- Receptions: 4
- Receiving yards: 4
- Passing yards: 34
- Passing touchdowns: 1
- Stats at Pro Football Reference

Head coaching record
- Regular season: 0–10 (.000)
- Military career
- Allegiance: United States
- Branch: U.S. Army
- Rank: Lieutenant Colonel
- College Football Hall of Fame

Harrison Samuel Francis (October 26, 1913 – April 23, 2002) was an American professional football player and coach, Olympic shot putter, and Army officer.

== Biography ==
Francis was born in Dunbar, Nebraska, and graduated from high school in Oberlin, Kansas.

He played college football at the University of Nebraska, where, in 1936, he was the runner-up for the Heisman Trophy. Francis was also an exceptional athlete in track and field and placed fourth in the shot put at the 1936 Summer Olympics.

Francis was the first overall selection in the 1937 NFL draft by the Philadelphia Eagles. His rights were traded to the Chicago Bears in exchange for Bill Hewitt and $4,000 in cash on February 15, 1937. He played in the NFL for four years with the Bears, Pittsburgh Pirates, and Brooklyn Dodgers before leaving to get a master's degree at the University of Iowa and serve in the Army during World War II.

After gaining experience serving as head coach for the football team at Camp Lee during World War II, Francis was hired as the head football coach at Kansas State University for the 1947 season. Francis coached at Kansas State for one year, compiling a record of 0–10.

Francis remained in the Army, serving in Korea and Vietnam, and held the rank of lieutenant colonel upon retirement. He is buried in Springfield National Cemetery.

== Coaching career ==
Francis served as the 21st head football coach at Kansas State University, helming the team for the 1947 season. He is the only Kansas State football coach to lose every game that he coached. The program's first coach, Ira Pratt, was winless in his one season in 1896, but tallied one tie for a record of 0–1–1. Francis' 1947 Kansas State squad was outscored 283 to 71, and was shut out on three occasions. Their closest contest was a two-point loss to New Mexico at home, and their most lopsided defeat was a 55–0 rout by rival Kansas.

=== Head coaching record ===
| Year | Team | Overall | Conference | Standing |
|---|---|---|---|---|
Kansas State Wildcats (Big Six Conference) (1945)
| 1947 | Kansas State | 0–10 | 0–5 | 6th |
| Kansas State: | | 0–10 | 0–5 | |
| Total: | | 0–10 | | |

== Athletic honors ==
Francis was inducted into the College Football Hall of Fame and the Kansas Sports Hall of Fame.

== Sources ==
- Lyons, Robert S. (2010). On Any Given Sunday, A Life of Bert Bell. Philadelphia: Temple University Press. ISBN 978-1-59213-731-2
