= Stu Smith =

American football player (1915–1969)

Stuart Moore Smith
Profile
- Position: Running back

Personal information
- Born: February 3, 1915; Montour Falls, New York, U.S.
- Died: November 7, 1969 (aged 54); Baltimore, Maryland, U.S.

Career information
- College: Bucknell University

Career history
- 1937–1938: Pittsburgh Steelers
- Stats at Pro Football Reference

Stuart Moore Smith (February 3, 1915 – November 7, 1969) was an American professional football player who played running back for two seasons for the Pittsburgh Steelers.

== Early life ==
Stuart Smith was born on February 3, 1915, in Montour Falls, New York. He attended Cook Academy in Montour Falls. He played football at Bucknell University.

== Career ==
Smith played football for the Pittsburgh Steelers from 1937 to 1939.

Smith worked for DuPont in Buffalo, New York. In 1957, he moved to Baltimore and established Stuart M. Smith Inc., a motor transportation company. He remained president of the company until his death.

== Personal life ==
Smith married Edith McCormick. They had a son and daughter, Craig M. and Judy. He lived in Towson.

Smith died on November 7, 1969, at St. Joseph Hospital in Baltimore. He was buried in Dulaney Valley Memorial Gardens.
