= Carl Jorgensen (American football) =

American football player (1911–1984)

No. 54, 42
- Position: Tackle

Personal information
- Born: February 5, 1911; Denmark
- Died: July 2, 1984 (aged 73); Arcadia, California, U.S.
- Listed height: 6 ft 0 in (1.83 m)
- Listed weight: 205 lb (93 kg)

Career information
- High school: San Mateo (California)
- College: Saint Mary's (1930–1933)

Career history

Playing
- Green Bay Packers (1934); Philadelphia Eagles (1935)

Coaching
- Mt. Shasta High School (1936–1938) Football / basketball coach; Yuba College (1938–1942) Football / basketball coach; Portland (1946–1949) Line coach / golf coach; Saint Mary's (1950) Line coach; Pacific (1951) Line coach

Awards and highlights
- Second-team All-American (1933); First-team All-PCC (1933)

Career statistics
- Games played: 21
- Field goals made: 1
- Stats at Pro Football Reference

Carl Anker Overgaard Jorgensen (February 5, 1911 – July 2, 1984) was an American professional football player who was a tackle for two seasons in the National Football League (NFL) for the Green Bay Packers and Philadelphia Eagles. He played college football for the Saint Mary's Gaels. He later served as a coach for high school and college teams.

== Early life ==
Jorgensen was born on February 5, 1911, in Denmark, and moved to the U.S. at age four. He had a brother, Wagner, who also became a football player. He attended San Mateo High School in California where he played football as a tackle, helping the school win the state championship in 1926. After high school, he enrolled at Saint Mary's College of California in 1930, where he was a member of the freshman football team. He then made the varsity team in 1931.

In 1932, Jorgensen was used at Saint Mary's as a placekicker in addition to tackle. He was reported to have helped the team win several games with his "educated toe" and finished the year having converted 15 of 17 extra point attempts. Saint Mary's finished the 1932 season with a record of 6–2–1. The following season, he helped Saint Mary's to a record of 6–3–1 and was named both first-team All-Pacific Coast by United Press and first-team All-American by the New York Sun. He was described by The Post-Crescent at the time as "one of the outstanding men in the country, aggressive, particularly able in helping clean out the secondary, and fast under punts. He graduated from Saint Mary's in 1934.

== Professional career ==
In April 1934, Jorgensen signed to play professionally with the Green Bay Packers of the National Football League (NFL). His performance in the East–West Shrine Game earlier that year impressed Packers' head coach Curly Lambeau. He made the team and appeared in 10 games, two as a starter. He recorded a blocked punt in the team's 6–0 loss to the Chicago Cardinals, but after the game coach Lambeau announced that Jorgensen had been suspended from the team. The 1934 Packers compiled a record of 7–6, placing third in their division. By playing for the Packers, Jorgensen became the first NFL player born in Denmark.

In May 1935, Jorgensen and Earl Witte were sold to the Philadelphia Eagles. He made the team as a reserve tackle and also was occasionally used as a kicker, scoring a field goal in the team's loss to the Cardinals and also recording one extra point. He was one of only 16 to successfully attempt a field goal in the 1935 NFL season. He finished the season having appeared in 11 games, two as a starter, as the Eagles compiled a record of 2–9. He did not return to the Eagles in 1936, concluding his NFL career having appeared in 21 games, four as a starter, while recording a field goal and an extra point made.

== Later life and death ==
Jorgensen returned to California in 1936 and became the head coach at Mt. Shasta High School. He served as head football and basketball coach as well as the school's vice principal, with his teams "compiling a good record". He joined Yuba College in 1938, where he coached football and basketball until 1942. Afterwards, he joined the United States Navy to serve in World War II, reaching the rank of lieutenant commander. After the war, he joined the University of Portland as line coach for the Portland Pilots football team in 1946. At Portland, he also served as golf coach and was an instructor in law and accounting.

Jorgensen returned to Saint Mary's in 1950 as line coach. However, the team was discontinued after that season and he then became the line coach of the Pacific Tigers in 1951. After one season there, he quit in 1952 to accept a farm management job in Arizona. He later worked as a financial manager for Jet Propulsion Laboratory for 35 years.

Jorgensen received a law degree from Northwestern University in 1950. He was inducted into the Saint Mary's Hall of Fame in 1973. Jorgensen died on July 2, 1984, at the age of 73, in Arcadia, California.
