= Drew Ellis (American football) =

American football player (1914–1988)

No. 35
- Position: Offensive tackle

Personal information
- Born: December 27, 1914; Ochiltree County, Texas, U.S.
- Died: May 18, 1988 (aged 73); Perryton, Texas, U.S.
- Listed height: 6 ft 1 in (1.85 m)
- Listed weight: 215 lb (98 kg)

Career information
- High school: Perryton (Perryton, Texas)
- College: TCU
- NFL draft: 1937: 3rd round, 21st overall pick

Career history
- Philadelphia Eagles (1938–1939)

Career NFL statistics
- Games played: 22
- Games started: 19
- Stats at Pro Football Reference

Benjamin Drew Ellis (December 27, 1914 – May 18, 1988) was an American professional football offensive tackle who played for two seasons in the National Football League (NFL) for the Philadelphia Eagles. After playing college football for the TCU Horned Frogs, he was drafted by the Eagles in the third round of the 1937 NFL draft and played for the team from 1938 to 1939. He started 19 of the team's 22 games over the course of the two seasons at left tackle. He served in World War II for the United States Army.
