= Jay Arnold =

American football player (1912–1982)

- Arnold in 1940

No. 34
- Positions: Halfback; Defensive back

Personal information
- Born: September 9, 1912; Rogers, Texas, U.S.
- Died: April 9, 1982 (aged 69); Houston, Texas, U.S.

Career information
- High school: Greenville (Greenville, Texas)
- College: Texas
- NFL draft: 1937: undrafted

Career history
- Philadelphia Eagles (1937–1940); Pittsburgh Steelers (1941)

Career NFL statistics
- Games played: 50
- Starts: 33
- Yards rushing: 43 (1.2 average)
- Yards receiving: 573 (16.4 average)
- Touchdowns: 4
- Stats at Pro Football Reference

Jay Lawrence Arnold (September 9, 1912 – April 9, 1982) was an American professional football player who played five seasons in the National Football League (NFL) for the Philadelphia Eagles and the Pittsburgh Steelers from 1937-1941. He played halfback — generally slotted out to the wing as a receiver — and defensive back.

== High school ==
Arnold played high school football at Greenville High School where he made the 1931 Texas All-State Team as a fullback and led his team to the state semi-finals.

== College career ==
Arnold played college football at the University of Texas where he lettered in 1933, 1935 and 1936 as a halfback.

== Pro career ==
Arnold was undrafted but was signed by the Philadelphia Eagles in 1937. He played in 50 games over 5 seasons between 1937-1941, playing offense, defense, punting and kicking.

In 1938 Arnold became one of only six NFL players to have a receiving touchdown, a fumble recovery for a touchdown, and an interception return for a touchdown in the same season.

== Later life ==
Arnold died on April 9, 1982 in Houston, Texas.
