= Heavener High School =

Location
- E 4th St; Heavener, Oklahoma 74937; United States; 34°53′13″N 94°35′49″W

Information
- Type: Public School
- Teaching staff: 23.81 (FTE)
- Grades: 9-12
- Enrollment: 312 (2023-2024)
- Student to teacher ratio: 13.10
- Colours: Purple and gold
- Mascot: Wolf
- Website: Heavener High School

Heavener High School is a public high school located in Heavener, Oklahoma.

The school educates approximately 350 students grades 9–12. Activities include softball, marching band, choir, baseball, football, track and field, basketball, soccer, and cheerleading.

Oklahoma history and government and physical education are taught in the high school in addition to more nationally typical courses, as mandated by state law.

== Curriculum ==
In addition to providing typical academic courses in English, mathematics and science, Heavener High School offers an Oklahoma history and government course as required by Oklahoma state law.

Oklahoma high schools must provide a physical education course designed to provide a minimum of 150 minutes of physical education per week, unless provided an exemption by the Oklahoma State Department of Education due to undue hardship.

== Notable alumni ==
- Jack Davis, American football player
- Koda Glover, MLB pitcher for the Washington Nationals
