= Fritz Ferko =

American football player (1910–1974)

No. 11, 19
- Position: Tackle

Personal information
- Born: December 23, 1910; Nesquehoning, Pennsylvania
- Died: January 22, 1974 (aged 63); Jim Thorpe, Pennsylvania
- Listed height: 6 ft 1 in (1.85 m)
- Listed weight: 242 lb (110 kg)

Career information
- High school: Nesquehoning (PA)
- College: West Chester, Mount St. Mary's

Career history
- Pittsburgh Pirates (1936)*; Philadelphia Eagles (1937-1938); Jersey City Giants (1938)
- * Offseason or practice squad member only
- Stats at Pro Football Reference

John Frederick "Fritz" Ferko (December 23, 1910 – January 22, 1974) was an American football tackle.

Ferko was born in Nesquehoning, Pennsylvania, in 1910. He was the son of Theodor and Mary (Pawlinko) Ferko. He attended Nesquehoning High School where he earned three varsity letters. He also attended West Chester Teachers College and Mount St. Mary's College.

In 1936, he signed with the Pittsburgh Pirates of the National Football League (NFL) and attended the preseason training camp, but he was cut in late August prior to the start of the regular season. He played for the Philadelphia Eagles in 1937 and 1938. He appeared in 13 NFL games, five as a starter. In 1938, he also played for the Jersey City Giants of the American Association.

Ferko was employed for many years at the Bonney Forge & Foundry in Allentown, Pennsylvania. He died in 1974 at age 63.
