= Dan Barnhart =

American football player (1912–1965)

Profile
- Position: Tailback

Personal information
- Born: June 27, 1912; Chickasha, Oklahoma, U.S.
- Died: June 16, 1965 (aged 52); Los Angeles County, California, U.S.
- Listed height: 6 ft 0 in (1.83 m)
- Listed weight: 200 lb (91 kg)

Career information
- College: Centenary; St. Mary's

Career history
- Philadelphia Eagles (1934)

Career statistics
- TD–INT: 1–0
- Passing yards: 4
- Passer rating: 122.9
- Stats at Pro Football Reference

Daniel High Barnhart (June 27, 1912 – June 16, 1965) was an American football tailback who played in the National Football League (NFL). He played for one season for the Philadelphia Eagles in 1934. He played college football at Centenary and St. Mary's.

== Professional career ==
Barnhart played in one game for the Philadelphia Eagles in 1934, throwing a four-yard touchdown pass to offensive tackle Bob Gonya.
