= Reds Bassman =

American football player (1913–2010)

No. 24
- Position: Halfback

Personal information
- Born: February 25, 1913; Philadelphia, Pennsylvania, U.S.
- Died: August 3, 2010 (aged 97); Petersburg, Virginia, U.S.
- Listed height: 5 ft 11 in (1.80 m)
- Listed weight: 180 lb (82 kg)

Career information
- High school: Central (Philadelphia)
- College: Ursinus
- NFL draft: 1936: undrafted

Career history
- Philadelphia Eagles (1936)
- Stats at Pro Football Reference

Herman L. "Reds" Bassman (February 25, 1913 – August 3, 2010) was an American professional football halfback who played one season with the Philadelphia Eagles of the National Football League (NFL). He played college football at Ursinus College.

== Early life ==
Bassman attended Central High School in Philadelphia, Pennsylvania.

== College career ==
Bassman played for the Ursinus Bears from 1933 to 1935. He also participated in track and wrestling. He returned an interception 45 yards for a touchdown in a 7–6 upset victory against the Penn Quakers in 1934. Bassman was inducted into the Ursinus College Athletics Hall of Fame in 1980.

== Professional career ==
Bassman played in eight games for the Philadelphia Eagles in 1936. Injuries reportedly cut short his career.

== Personal life ==
Bassman served in the United States Army Air Corps during World War II. He died on August 3, 2010, in Petersburg, Virginia. He was the oldest living former Eagles player at the time of his death.
