= Joe Bukant =

American football player (1915–2007)

No. 36
- Position: Fullback

Personal information
- Born: October 31, 1915; Divernon, Illinois, U.S.
- Died: February 9, 2007 (aged 91); Portage, Michigan, U.S.
- Listed height: 6 ft 0 in (1.83 m)
- Listed weight: 216 lb (98 kg)

Career information
- High school: Washington (Washington, Missouri)
- College: Washington University in St. Louis
- NFL draft: 1938: 3rd round, 17th overall pick

Career history
- Philadelphia Eagles (1938–1940); Chicago Cardinals (1942–1943)

Career NFL statistics
- Rushing yards: 426
- Rushing average: 2.3
- Touchdowns: 4
- TD–INT: 1–7
- Passing yards: 179
- Passer rating: 9.2
- Stats at Pro Football Reference

Joseph N. Bukant (October 31, 1915 – February 9, 2007) was an American professional football player who was a fullback for five seasons in the National Football League (NFL). After playing college football for Washington University in St. Louis, he was selected by the Philadelphia Eagles in the third round of the 1938 NFL draft. He played for the Eagles from 1938 to 1940, and for the Chicago Cardinals from 1942 to 1943.

== College career ==
Bukant played college football for the Washington University Bears, where he earned two-time all-Midwest and all-Missouri Valley Conference honors. Bukant also earned AP honorable mention All-American in 1935. He also lettered in track and field. He was inducted into the Washington University Bears Hall of Fame in 1993.

== Professional career ==
Bukant was selected by the Philadelphia Eagles in the third round of the 1938 NFL draft. He was signed to a contract by the team on July 21, 1938. In his three seasons with the Eagles, he played in all 33 games. As a rookie, he started one game and had 48 rushing attempts for 119 yards, as well as one completed pass for 14 yards. In his second season in 1939, he had three starts, 59 rushes for 136 yards, and three touchdowns. He also punted once for 54 yards. In 1940, he started in four games, rushed 18 times for 50 yards and a touchdown, caught one pass for 13 yards, punted fifteen times for a total of 568 yards, and intercepted a pass for 10 yards.

After being inactive with an injury throughout the entire 1941 season, Bukant was traded to the Chicago Cardinals on July 26, 1942, in exchange for halfback Hugh McCullough. In Chicago, Bukant was reunited with his college coach Jimmy Conzelman. In 1942, Bukant rushed 17 times for 34 yards and went 4-of-15 passing for 56 yards and two interceptions. In 1943, he had 42 rushes for 87 yards and went 14-of-40 passing for 109 yards, one touchdown, and five interceptions. He also had five punts for 181 yards.

== Military career ==
After the 1943 NFL season ended, Bukant joined the United States Navy in order to serve in World War II. After training at the Great Lakes Naval Training Center, where he played for the Great Lakes Bluejackets service team, he was transferred to the United States Naval Training Center Bainbridge, Maryland in June 1944. He was transferred again to Camp Peary in Williamsburg, Virginia, in August 1944, where he played on the service team in 1944.
