= John Cole (American football) =

American football player (1915–1973)

- John Cole, 1937

No. 37
- Position: Fullback

Personal information
- Born: August 28, 1915; Bristol, Pennsylvania
- Died: January 18, 1973 (aged 57)
- Listed height: 5 ft 9 in (1.75 m)
- Listed weight: 197 lb (89 kg)

Career information
- High school: Bristol (PA)
- College: Saint Joseph's (PA)

Career history
- Philadelphia Eagles (1938, 1940)

John Johnson "King" Cole (August 28, 1915 – January 18, 1973) was an American football player.

Cole was born in 1915. He played college football for Saint Joseph's of Philadelphia from 1934 to 1937. He played at the fullback position and also handled kicking duties. He was the captain of the 1937 team. In June 1938, Cole was the top vote recipient fan balloting to select an Eastern all-star team to pay a game against the Philadelphia Eagles.

Cole also played professional football in the National Football League (NFL) for the Philadelphia Eagles (NFL), appearing in 18 games, one as a starter, during the 1938 and 1940 seasons. He carried the ball 27 times for 79 rushing yards and caught four passes for 20 yards. He scored six points on three extra points and a field goal. He also punted 10 times for an average of 33.6 yards.

Cole died in 1973 in Kingsport, Tennessee.
