= Bill Hughes (American football) =

American football player (1915–1978)

Profile
- Position: Offensive lineman

Personal information
- Born: April 11, 1915; Van Alstyne, Texas, U.S.
- Died: July 6, 1978 (aged 63); Pinellas County, Florida, U.S.

Career information
- College: University of Texas

Career history
- 1937–1940: Philadelphia Eagles
- 1941: Chicago Bears

Awards and highlights
- NFL champion (1941)

Bill Hughes (April 11, 1915 – July 6, 1978) was an American professional football player who was an offensive lineman for five seasons for the Philadelphia Eagles and Chicago Bears.
