= Maurice Harper =

American football player (1914–1987)

Profile
- Position: Center

Personal information
- Born: May 14, 1914; Bandera, Texas
- Died: August 22, 1987 (aged 73); Collin County, Texas
- Listed height: 6 ft 4 in (1.93 m)
- Listed weight: 227 lb (103 kg)

Career information
- College: Austin College

Career history
- Philadelphia Eagles (1939–1940); Pittsburgh Steelers (1941)

Career statistics
- Games played: 40
- Interception: 1
- Stats at Pro Football Reference

Maurice Sydney "Moose" Harper (May 14, 1914 - August 22, 1987) was an American football center in the National Football League (NFL). He played for the Philadelphia Eagles and the Pittsburgh Steelers.

Harper was born in Bandera, Texas.
