= Joe Carter (end) =

American football player (1909–1991)

No. 31, 17, 58, 55, 29
- Position: End

Personal information
- Born: July 23, 1909; Dalhart, Texas, U.S.
- Died: December 22, 1991 (aged 82)
- Listed height: 6 ft 1 in (1.85 m)
- Listed weight: 201 lb (91 kg)

Career information
- High school: North Dallas (Dallas, Texas)
- College: Austin; SMU

Career history
- Philadelphia Eagles (1933–1940); Green Bay Packers (1942); Brooklyn Tigers (1944); Chicago Bears (1945)

Awards and highlights
- 2× NFL All-Star (1938–1939); NFL receptions co-leader (1934)
- Stats at Pro Football Reference

William Joe Carter (July 23, 1909 – December 22, 1991) was an American football end. He played for 11 seasons in the National Football League (NFL), from 1933 to 1940 for the Philadelphia Eagles, in 1942 for the Green Bay Packers, 1944 for the Brooklyn Tigers, and 1945 for the Chicago Bears. Carter graduated North Dallas High School and attended Southern Methodist University (SMU).

== Career ==
Eagles end Joe Carter (L) recovers a Cincinnati Reds fumble in that team's final game, November 1934 — a 64-0 blowout loss that remains the worst NFL shutout ever.

A 6'1", 208 pound end, Carter led the NFL in receiving in 1934 and finished sixth in 1937 and third in 1938.

Carter was a charter member of the Eagles when the team entered the NFL in 1933. At the time of his retirement in 1940 at the age of 30 he was last of the original Eagles squad still affiliated with the franchise.
