= 1994 Philadelphia Eagles season =

62nd season in franchise history

- Owner: Jeffrey Lurie
- Head coach: Rich Kotite
- Offensive coordinator: Zeke Bratkowski
- Defensive coordinator: Bud Carson
- Home stadium: Veterans Stadium

Results
- Record: 7–9
- Division place: 4th NFC East
- Playoffs: Did not qualify

Uniform
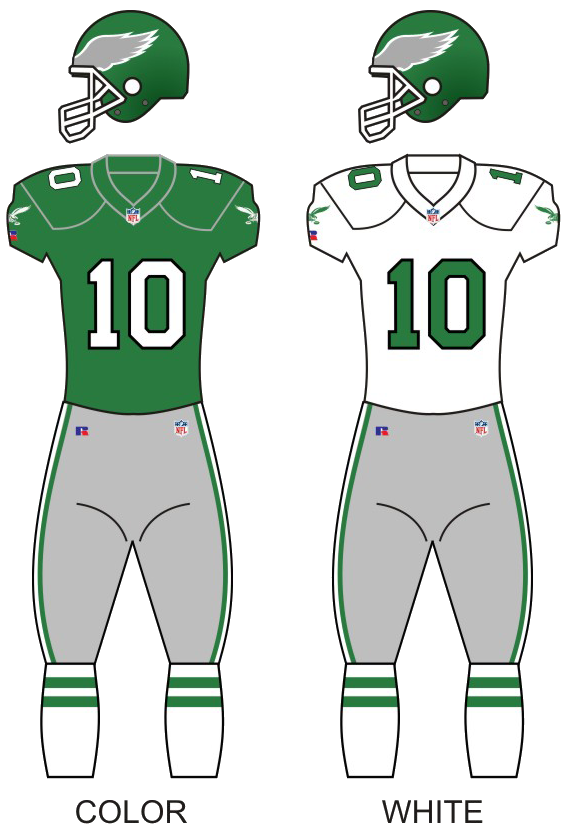

The 1994 Philadelphia Eagles season was their 62nd in the National Football League (NFL). On May 6, 1994, the NFL approved the transfer of majority interest in the team from Norman Braman to Jeffrey Lurie. The team failed to improve upon their previous output of 8–8, winning only seven games and failing to qualify for the playoffs.

Rich Kotite's fate as Eagles head coach was sealed after a seven-game losing streak to end the season knocked Philly from the top of the NFC at 7–2 all the way to fourth place in the Eastern Division. One key injury was the season-ending broken leg suffered by linebacker Byron Evans, who was lost in game #10 against Cleveland.

The epitome of this collapse came on Christmas Eve at Cincinnati, when the 2–13 Bengals scored six points in the final seconds – thanks in part to the recovery of a fumbled kick return – to steal a win.

The high point of the '94 season occurred on October 2 at Candlestick Park, when the Eagles steamrolled the eventual Super Bowl winning 49ers by a 40–8 count. After the season, Vaughan Johnson retired.

== Offseason ==
Additions	Subtractions
K Eddie Murray (Cowboys)	P Jeff Feagles (Cardinals)
DE Burt Grossman (Chargers)	S Andre Waters (Cardinals)
LB Bill Romanowski (49ers)	LB Seth Joyner (Cardinals)
DE William Fuller (Oilers)	DE Tim Harris (49ers)
S Mike Zordich (Cardinals)	G Mike Schad (Browns)
P Bryan Barker (Chiefs)	

=== NFL draft ===
The 1994 NFL draft was held April 24–25, 1994. This was the first draft in which the rounds were reduced to seven in total.

1994 Philadelphia Eagles draft
Round	Pick	Player	Position	College	Notes
1	14	Bernard Williams	Offensive tackle	Georgia	
2	37	Bruce Walker	Defensive tackle	UCLA	
2	42	Charlie Garner *	Running back	Tennessee	
3	77	Joe Panos	Guard	Wisconsin	
3	103	Eric Zomalt	Defensive back	California	
5	144	Marvin Goodwin	Defensive back	UCLA	
6	174	Ryan McCoy	Linebacker	Houston	
6	193	Mitch Berger *	Punter	Colorado	
7	206	Mark Montgomery	Running back	Wisconsin	
Made roster * Made at least one Pro Bowl during career

== Personnel ==
1994 Philadelphia Eagles staff
Front office Head coaches: Head coach – Rich Kotite; Offensive coaches: Offensive coordinator/quarterbacks – Zeke Bratkowski; Running backs – Dick Wood; Receivers/tight ends – Lew Carpenter; Offensive line – Bill Muir; Offensive assistant – Bobby Hammond	Defensive coaches: Defensive coordinator/secondary – Bud Carson; Defensive line – Dale Haupt; Linebackers – Jim Vechiarella; Defensive assistant – Peter Giunta; Special teams coaches: Special teams coordinator – Larry Pasquale; Special teams assistant – Bobby Hammond; Strength and conditioning: Strength and conditioning – Jim Williams

== Roster ==
1994 Philadelphia Eagles roster
Quarterbacks (QB): 6 Bubby Brister; 12 Randall Cunningham; 11 Jay Fiedler; Running backs (RB): 25 Charlie Garner; 45 Vaughn Hebron; 32 James Joseph; 31 Brian O'Neal FB; 34 Herschel Walker; Wide receivers (WR): 82 Victor Bailey; 86 Fred Barnett; 85 Jeff Sydner; 89 Calvin Williams; Tight ends (TE): 84 Mark Bavaro; 87 Maurice Johnson	Offensive linemen (OL): 72 David Alexander C; 78 Antone Davis G; 73 Lester Holmes G; 68 Tom McHale T; 63 Joe Panos G; 75 Rob Selby G/T; 76 Broderick Thompson T; 74 Bernard Williams T; Defensive linemen (DL): 96 Mike Flores DE; 95 William Fuller DE; 69 Burt Grossman DE; 91 Andy Harmon DT; 98 Tommy Jeter DT; 90 William Perry DT; 94 Leonard Renfro DT; 93 Greg Townsend DE	Linebackers (LB): 54 Britt Hager MLB; 52 Vaughan Johnson MLB; 58 Derrick Oden OLB; 53 Bill Romanowski OLB; 55 Ken Rose OLB; 51 William Thomas OLB; 57 Marc Woodard OLB; Defensive backs (DB): 21 Eric Allen CB; 23 Derrick Frazier CB; 22 Marvin Goodwin SS; 26 Al Jackson CB; 47 Greg Jackson FS; 29 Mark McMillian CB; 38 Rich Miano FS; 42 Mike Reid FS; 30 Otis Smith CB; 27 Eric Zomalt SS; 36 Mike Zordich SS; Special teams (ST): 4 Bryan Barker P; 66 John Hudson LS; 3 Eddie Murray K; 14 Jeff Wilkins K	Practice squad: 39 Phil Bryant RB; 19 Gregory Clifton WR; 67 Chris Dausin C; 80 Tom Garlick WR; 97 Ray Hall DT; Reserve: 24 Corey Barlow CB (IR); 64 Curt Brown DT (IR); 71 Mike Chalenski DT (IR); 56 Byron Evans LB (IR); 10 JeMone Smith WR (IR); 52 active, 5 inactive, 5 practice squad Rookies in italics

== Regular season ==
=== Schedule ===
Week	Date	Opponent	Result	Record	Kickoff	Network	Attendance
1	September 4, 1994	at **New York Giants**	**L** 28–23	0–1	1:00pm ET	FOX	76,130
2	September 12, 1994	Chicago Bears	**W** 30–22	1–1	9:00pm ET	ABC	64,890
3	September 18, 1994	Green Bay Packers	**W** 13–7	2–1	1:00pm ET	FOX	63,922
4	Bye						
5	October 2, 1994	at San Francisco 49ers	**W** 40–8	3–1	4:00pm ET	FOX	64,843
6	October 9, 1994	**Washington Redskins**	**W** 21–17	4–1	8:00pm ET	TNT	63,947
7	October 16, 1994	at **Dallas Cowboys**	**L** 24–13	4–2	4:00pm ET	FOX	64,703
8	October 24, 1994	Houston Oilers	**W** 21–6	5–2	9:00pm ET	ABC	65,233
9	October 30, 1994	at **Washington Redskins**	**W** 31–29	6–2	1:00pm ET	FOX	53,530
10	November 6, 1994	**Arizona Cardinals**	**W** 17–7	7–2	1:00pm ET	FOX	64,952
11	November 13, 1994	Cleveland Browns	**L** 26–7	7–3	1:00pm ET	NBC	65,233
12	November 20, 1994	at **Arizona Cardinals**	**L** 12–6	7–4	4:00pm ET	FOX	62,779
13	November 27, 1994	at Atlanta Falcons	**L** 28–21	7–5	1:00pm ET	FOX	60,008
14	December 4, 1994	**Dallas Cowboys**	**L** 31–19	7–6	1:00pm ET	FOX	65,974
15	December 11, 1994	at Pittsburgh Steelers	**L** 14–3	7–7	1:00pm ET	FOX	55,474
16	December 18, 1994	**New York Giants**	**L** 16–13	7–8	4:00pm ET	FOX	64,540
17	December 24, 1994	at Cincinnati Bengals	**L** 33–30	7–9	1:00pm ET	FOX	39,923

Note: Intra-division opponents are in bold text.

=== Game summaries ===
==== Week 1 ====
Sunday, September 4, 1994 – Kickoff 1:01 PM Eastern Played at Giants Stadium with 68F degrees and 11 MPH wind

'1st Quarter Highlights QB Dave Brown intercepted by Mark McMillian of the Eagles. KR Jeff Snyder fumbles and the Giants recover. Giants RB Rodney Hampton 1 yard TD run. (7–0 Giants) Giants PR Dave Meggett returns punt 68 yard TD (14–0 Giants)

==== Week 17 ====
Saturday, December 24, 1994 Kickoff 1:00 PM Eastern

Played at Riverfront Stadium on an AstroTurf playing surface in 38F degrees with a 12 MPH wind

	**1**	**2**	**3**	**4**	**Final**
Philadelphia Eagles (7–9)	3	17	7	3	30
Cincinnati Bengals (3–13)	7	3	10	13	33

		**SCORING PLAYS**	**PHIL**	**CIN**	**TIME**
1st	Bengals	Carl Pickens 14 yard pass from Jeff Blake (Doug Pelfrey kick)	0	7	
	Eagles	Eddie Murray 34 yard field goal	3	7	
2nd	Bengals	Doug Pelfrey 18 yard field goal	3	10	
	Eagles	Herschel Walker 94 yard kickoff return (Eddie Murray kick)	10	10	
	Eagles	James Joseph 7 yard pass from Bubby Brister (Eddie Murray kick)	17	10	
	Eagles	Eddie Murray 23 yard field goal	20	10	
3rd	Eagles	Mike Zordich 18 yard interception return (Eddie Murray kick)	27	10	
	Bengals	Harold Green 5 yard rush (Doug Pelfrey kick)	27	17	
	Bengals	Doug Pelfrey 36 yard field goal	27	20	
4th	Eagles	Eddie Murray 35 yard field goal	30	20	
	Bengals	Tony McGee 8 yard pass from Jeff Blake (Doug Pelfrey kick)	30	27	
	Bengals	Doug Pelfrey 22 yard field goal	30	30	
	Bengals	Doug Pelfrey 54 yard field goal	30	33	

=== Standings ===
NFC East
	W	L	T	PCT	PF	PA	STK
^{(2)} Dallas Cowboys	12	4	0	.750	414	248	L1
New York Giants	9	7	0	.563	279	305	W6
Arizona Cardinals	8	8	0	.500	235	267	L1
Philadelphia Eagles	7	9	0	.438	308	308	L7
Washington Redskins	3	13	0	.188	320	412	W1

== Postseason ==
Shortly after the season ended, head coach Rich Kotite was fired. There were rumors that the Eagles new owner Jeffrey Lurie would not keep him on as coach. His fate was sealed when, after a 7-2 start, the Eagles lost the last 7 games of the season and missed the playoffs.

During the few weeks the Eagles would interview outside the organization for a replacement, they had to wait until the Super Bowl was played to talk to candidates from the teams in the playoffs. Less than a week after Super Bowl XXIX, won by the San Francisco 49ers, the Eagles hired their defensive coordinator Ray Rhodes.
