= 1993 Philadelphia Eagles season =

NFL team season

- Owner: Norman Braman
- Head coach: Rich Kotite
- Offensive coordinator: Zeke Bratkowski
- Defensive coordinator: Bud Carson
- Home stadium: Veterans Stadium

Results
- Record: 8–8
- Division place: 3rd NFC East
- Playoffs: Did not qualify

Uniform
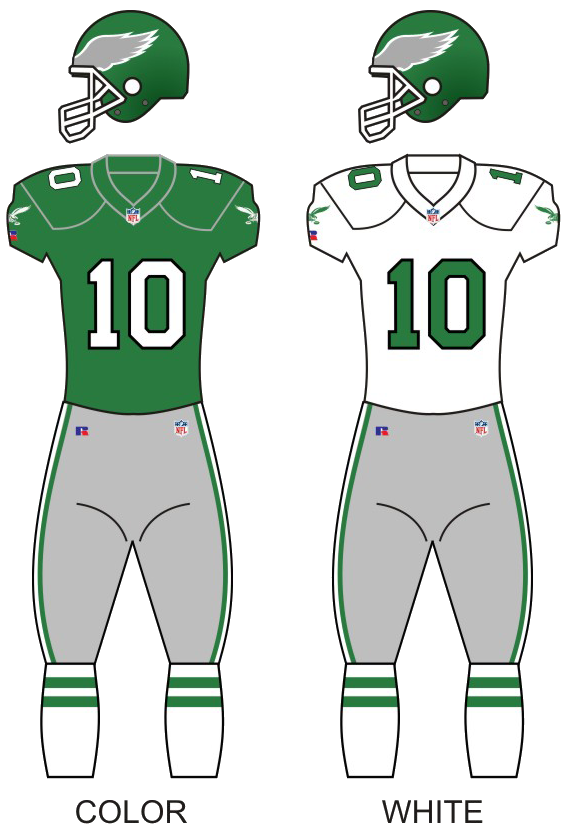

The 1993 Philadelphia Eagles season was their 61st in the National Football League (NFL). The team failed to improve upon their previous output of 11–5, winning only eight games and failed to qualify for the playoffs for only the second time in six seasons. Ten of their sixteen games were decided by a touchdown or less. The team was without future hall of fame defensive end Reggie White, who had signed via free agency with the Green Bay Packers.

The downturn was directly related to the twin losses of QB Randall Cunningham (broken leg) and WR Fred Barnett (ACL tear) to season-ending injuries in a 35–30 win against the New York Jets on October 3. Though the Eagles won their first four, following that game, lost six straight to fall out of playoff contention. Bubby Brister was only able to do so much in a starting role, but the club rallied to win their final three games, including their first road win in San Francisco in 10 years.

== Offseason ==
The Eagles held training camp at West Chester University for the 14th consecutive year.

=== NFL draft ===
The 1993 NFL draft was held April 25–26, 1993. The draft was reduced to eight rounds, down from 12. Because the Eagles tied with five other teams at 11–5 in 1992, they rotated in picking 20th to 25th in the eight rounds. There were 224 players taken in this draft by the NFL. The Eagles had two first round picks at number 19 and 24 overall. With those, they chose Lester Holmes, an offensive tackle out of Jackson State, and Leonard Renfro, a defensive tackle out of Colorado.

1993 Philadelphia Eagles draft
Round	Pick	Player	Position	College	Notes
1	19	Lester Holmes	Offensive tackle	Jackson State	
1	24	Leonard Renfro	Defensive tackle	Colorado	
2	50	Victor Bailey	Wide receiver	Missouri	
3	75	Derrick Frazier	Cornerback	Texas A&M	
3	77	Mike Reid	Defensive back	North Carolina State	
6	163	Derrick Oden	Linebacker	Alabama	
7	190	Joey Mickey	Tight end	Oklahoma	
8	217	Doug Skene	Offensive tackle	Michigan	
Made roster

== Personnel ==
1993 Philadelphia Eagles staff
Front office: Owner – Norman Braman; President/chief operating officer – Harry Gamble; Director of player personnel – Joe Woolley; Head coaches: Head coach – Rich Kotite; Offensive coaches: Offensive coordinator/quarterbacks – Zeke Bratkowski; Running backs – Dick Wood; Receivers/tight ends – Lew Carpenter; Offensive line – Bill Muir; Offensive assistant – Bobby Hammond	Defensive coaches: Defensive coordinator/secondary – Bud Carson; Defensive line – Dale Haupt; Linebackers – Jim Vechiarella; Defensive assistant – Peter Giunta; Special teams coaches: Special teams coordinator – Larry Pasquale; Special teams assistant – Bobby Hammond; Strength and conditioning: Strength and conditioning – Jim Williams

== Roster ==
1993 Philadelphia Eagles roster
**Quarterbacks (QB)**: 6 Bubby Brister; 12 Randall Cunningham; 8 Preston Jones; 7 Ken O'Brien; **Running backs (RB)**: 45 Vaughn Hebron; 32 James Joseph; 23 Heath Sherman; 22 Vai Sikahema; 46 Markus Thomas; 34 Herschel Walker KR; **Wide receivers (WR)**: 82 Victor Bailey; 80 James Lofton; 81 Paul Richardson; 89 Calvin Williams; 83 Mike Young; **Tight ends (TE)**: 84 Mark Bavaro; 87 Maurice Johnson	**Offensive linemen (OL)**: 72 David Alexander C; 62 Brian Baldinger G/T; 78 Antone Davis T; 65 Ron Hallstrom G; 73 Lester Holmes G; 68 Tom McHale T; 79 Mike Schad G; 76 Broderick Thompson T; **Defensive linemen (DL)**: 71 Mike Chalenski DE; 95 Mike Flores DE; 91 Andy Harmon DT/DE; 98 Tommy Jeter DE; 77 Keith Millard DT; 90 William Perry DT; 94 Leonard Renfro DT; 96 Clyde Simmons DE	**Linebackers (LB)**: 52 Louis Cooper OLB; 56 Byron Evans MLB; 54 Britt Hager MLB; 59 Seth Joyner OLB; 58 Derrick Oden MLB; 53 John Roper OLB; 51 William Thomas OLB; **Defensive backs (DB)**: 21 Eric Allen CB; 24 Corey Barlow CB; 33 William Frizzell SS; 48 Wes Hopkins FS; 29 Mark McMillian CB; 38 Rich Miano FS; 42 Mike Reid FS; 26 Ben Smith CB; 30 Otis Smith CB; 20 Andre Waters SS; **Special teams (ST)**: 5 Jeff Feagles P; 66 John Hudson LS; 9 Roger Ruzek K	**Practice squad**: 64 Curt Brown DT; 19 Reggie Lawrence WR; 88 Mike McKenzie TE; 57 Marc Woodard LB; **Reserve**: 86 Fred Barnett WR (IR); 39 Tony Brooks RB (PUP); 61 Eric Floyd G (IR); 37 Derrick Frazier CB (IR); 97 Tim Harris DE (IR); 55 Ken Rose LB (IR); 75 Rob Selby G (IR); 85 Jeff Sydner WR (IR); Rookies in italics 53 active, 8 reserve, 4 practice squad

=== Schedule ===
Week	Date	Opponent	Result	Record	Venue	Attendance
1	September 5	**Phoenix Cardinals**	**W** 23–17	1–0	Veterans Stadium	59,831
2	September 12	at Green Bay Packers	**W** 20–17	2–0	Lambeau Field	59,061
3	September 19	**Washington Redskins**	**W** 34–31	3–0	Veterans Stadium	65,435
4	Bye					
5	October 3	at New York Jets	**W** 35–30	4–0	Giants Stadium	72,593
6	October 10	Chicago Bears	**L** 6–17	4–1	Veterans Stadium	63,601
7	October 17	at **New York Giants**	**L** 10–21	4–2	Giants Stadium	76,050
8	Bye					
9	October 31	**Dallas Cowboys**	**L** 10–23	4–3	Veterans Stadium	61,912
10	November 7	at **Phoenix Cardinals**	**L** 3–16	4–4	Sun Devil Stadium	41,634
11	November 14	Miami Dolphins	**L** 14–19	4–5	Veterans Stadium	64,213
12	November 21	**New York Giants**	**L** 3–7	4–6	Veterans Stadium	62,928
13	November 28	at **Washington Redskins**	**W** 17–14	5–6	RFK Stadium	46,663
14	December 6	at **Dallas Cowboys**	**L** 17–23	5–7	Texas Stadium	64,521
15	December 12	Buffalo Bills	**L** 7–10	5–8	Veterans Stadium	60,769
16	December 19	at Indianapolis Colts	**W** 20–10	6–8	Hoosier Dome	44,952
17	December 26	New Orleans Saints	**W** 37–26	7–8	Veterans Stadium	50,085
18	January 3, 1994	at San Francisco 49ers	**W** 37–34 (OT)	8–8	Candlestick Park	61,653
Note: Intra-division opponents are in **bold** text.

== Game summaries ==
=== Week 1 ===
Team	1	2	3	4	Total
Cardinals	0	3	7	7	17
• Eagles	7	7	2	7	23

- Date: September 5
- Location: Veterans Stadium, Philadelphia
- Game start: 1:00 p.m. EST
- Game attendance: 59,831
- Game weather: 86 °F (30 °C) (Sunny); wind 10 mph (16 km/h)
- Referee: Larry Nemmers
- TV announcers (CBS): Jim Nantz & Randy Cross

=== Week 2 ===
The Eagles spoiled Reggie White's Lambeau Field debut as a member of the Packers. White carved out a Hall of Fame career in eight seasons (1985–92) with the Eagles before signing with Green Bay as a free agent in April 1993.

Team	1	2	3	4	Total
• Eagles	0	7	0	13	20
Packers	7	3	7	0	17

- Date: September 12
- Location: Lambeau Field, Green Bay, Wisconsin
- Game start: 12:00 p.m. CST
- Game attendance: 59,061
- Game weather: 64 °F (18 °C); wind 12 mph (19 km/h)
- Referee: Jerry Markbreit
- TV announcers (CBS): Verne Lundquist & John Madden

=== Week 3 ===
Team	1	2	3	4	Total
Redskins	0	14	7	10	31
• Eagles	3	7	7	17	34

- Date: September 19
- Location: Veterans Stadium, Philadelphia
- Game start: 1:00 p.m.
- Game attendance: 65,435
- Game weather: 70 °F (21 °C) (Partly Cloudy); wind 12 mph (19 km/h)
- Referee: Tom White
- TV announcers (CBS): Pat Summerall & John Madden

=== Week 5 ===
The victory was costly for the Eagles when Randall Cunningham went down with a season-ending injury, the second time in three seasons Philadelphia would have to play the majority of a campaign without its offensive leader.

Team	1	2	3	4	Total
• Eagles	0	14	7	14	35
Jets	14	7	7	2	30

- Date: October 3
- Location: Giants Stadium, East Rutherford, New Jersey
- Game start: 4:00 p.m.
- Game attendance: 72,593
- Game weather: 61 °F (16 °C); wind 17 mph (27 km/h)
- Referee: Ron Blum
- TV announcers (CBS): Pat Summerall & John Madden

Scoring summary
1	NYJ	James Thornton 7 yard pass from Boomer Esiason (Cary Blanchard kick)	NYJ 7–0
1	NYJ	Johnny Mitchell 14 yard pass from Boomer Esiason (Cary Blanchard kick)	NYJ 14–0
2	NYJ	Johnny Mitchell 12 yard pass from Boomer Esiason (Cary Blanchard kick)	NYJ 21–0
2	PHI	Herschel Walker 8 yard run (Matt Bahr kick)	NYJ 21–7
2	PHI	Mark Bavaro 10 yard pass from Bubby Brister (Matt Bahr kick)	NYJ 21–14
3	NYJ	Johnny Mitchell 65 yard pass from Boomer Esiason (Cary Blanchard kick)	NYJ 28–14
3	PHI	Calvin Williams 11 yard pass from Bubby Brister (Matt Bahr kick)	NYJ 28–21
4	PHI	Vaughn Hebron 1 yard run (Matt Bahr kick)	Tie 28–28
4	NYJ	Safety, intentional grounding by Brister in end zone	NYJ 30–28
4	PHI	Eric Allen 94 yard interception return (Matt Bahr kick)	PHI 35–30

=== Week 6 ===
Team	1	2	3	4	Total
• Bears	10	7	0	0	17
Eagles	0	0	0	6	6

- Date: October 10
- Location: Veterans Stadium, Philadelphia
- Game start: 1:00 p.m.
- Game attendance: 63,601
- Game weather: 52 °F (11 °C) (Sunny); wind 18 mph (29 km/h)
- Referee: Dale Hamer
- TV announcers (CBS): Verne Lundquist & Dan Fouts

=== Week 7 ===
Team	1	2	3	4	Total
Eagles	0	3	0	7	10
• Giants	0	14	0	7	21

- Date: October 17
- Location: Giants Stadium, East Rutherford, New Jersey
- Game start: 1:00 p.m.
- Game attendance: 76,050
- Game weather: 60 °F (16 °C); wind 9 mph (14 km/h)
- Referee: Bernie Kukar
- TV announcers (CBS): Verne Lundquist & Dan Fouts

=== Week 9 ===
Team	1	2	3	4	Total
• Cowboys	3	7	3	10	23
Eagles	0	7	0	3	10

- Date: October 31
- Location: Veterans Stadium, Philadelphia
- Game start: 4:00 p.m.
- Game attendance: 61,912
- Game weather: 45 °F (7 °C) (Light Rain & Fog); wind 17 mph (27 km/h)
- Referee: Johnny Grier
- TV announcers (CBS): Jim Nantz & Randy Cross

=== Week 10 ===
The Eagles suffered their first loss at Sun Devil Stadium after five consecutive victories.

Team	1	2	3	4	Total
Eagles	3	0	0	0	3
• Cardinals	3	13	0	0	16

- Date: November 7
- Location: Sun Devil Stadium, Tempe, Arizona
- Game start: 2:00 p.m.
- Game attendance: 41,634
- Game weather: 64 °F (18 °C); wind 4 mph (6.4 km/h)
- Referee: Gerald Austin
- TV announcers (CBS): Verne Lundquist & Dan Fouts

=== Week 11 ===
Miami's Don Shula became the NFL's all-time leader in coaching victories with his 326th, surpassing the Chicago Bears' legendary George Halas. The winning quarterback was future Eagles coach Doug Pederson, substituting for the injured Scott Mitchell. Mitchell became the Dolphins' starter when Dan Marino suffered a season-ending injury in week 6.

Team	1	2	3	4	Total
• Dolphins	6	7	3	3	19
Eagles	0	14	0	0	14

- Date: November 14
- Location: Veterans Stadium, Philadelphia
- Game start: 1:00 p.m.
- Game attendance: 64,213
- Game weather: 70 °F (21 °C) (Cloudy); wind 10 mph (16 km/h)
- Referee: Gordon McCarter
- TV announcers (NBC): Tom Hammond & Cris Collinsworth

=== Week 12 ===
The Giants earned their first win at Veterans Stadium since 1987.

Team	1	2	3	4	Total
• Giants	0	0	0	7	7
Eagles	0	0	3	0	3

- Date: November 21
- Location: Veterans Stadium, Philadelphia
- Game start: 4:00 p.m.
- Game attendance: 62,928
- Game weather: 48 °F (9 °C) (Sunny); wind 12 mph (19 km/h)
- Referee: Ed Hochuli
- TV announcers (CBS): Pat Summerall & John Madden

=== Week 13 ===
Team	1	2	3	4	Total
• Eagles	3	7	0	7	17
Redskins	0	0	0	14	14

- Date: November 28
- Location: RFK Stadium, Washington, D.C.
- Game start: 1:00 p.m.
- Game attendance: 46,663
- Game weather: 58 °F (14 °C); wind 14 mph (23 km/h)
- Referee: Gary Lane
- TV announcers (CBS): Tim Ryan & Matt Millen

=== Week 14 ===
Team	1	2	3	4	Total
Eagles	0	3	7	7	17
• Cowboys	7	9	0	7	23

- Date: December 6
- Location: Texas Stadium, Irving, Texas
- Game start: 8:00 p.m.
- Game attendance: 64,521
- Game weather: 50 °F (10 °C); wind 8 mph (13 km/h)
- Referee: Howard Roe
- TV announcers (ABC): Al Michaels, Frank Gifford, and Dan Dierdorf

=== Week 15 ===
Team	1	2	3	4	Total
• Bills	0	0	0	10	10
Eagles	0	0	7	0	7

- Date: December 12
- Location: Veterans Stadium, Philadelphia
- Game start: 1:00 p.m.
- Game attendance: 60,769
- Game weather: 36 °F (2 °C) (Sunny); wind 21 mph (34 km/h)
- Referee: Johnny Grier
- TV announcers (NBC): Marv Albert & Paul Maguire

=== Week 16 ===
Team	1	2	3	4	Total
• Eagles	10	0	7	3	20
Colts	3	0	0	7	10

- Date: December 19
- Location: Hoosier Dome, Indianapolis, Indiana
- Game start: 8:00 p.m.
- Game attendance: 44,952
- Game weather: indoors (dome)
- Referee: Dale Hamer
- TV announcers (ESPN): Mike Patrick & Joe Theismann

=== Week 17 ===
The Saints, who began the season 5–0, saw their slim playoff hopes extinguished.

Team	1	2	3	4	Total
Saints	9	3	7	7	26
• Eagles	0	18	6	13	37

- Date: December 26
- Location: Veterans Stadium, Philadelphia
- Game start: 1:00 p.m.
- Game attendance: 50,085
- Game weather: 23 °F (−5 °C) (Cloudy); wind 23 mph (37 km/h)
- Referee: Tom White
- TV announcers (CBS): Tim Ryan & Matt Millen

=== Week 18 ===
Team	1	2	3	4	OT	Total
• Eagles	10	14	10	0	3	37
49ers	3	7	14	10	0	34

- Date: January 3
- Location: Candlestick Park, San Francisco, California
- Game start: 6:00 p.m.
- Game attendance: 61,653
- Game weather: 50 °F (10 °C); wind 10 mph (16 km/h)
- Referee: Gerald Austin
- TV announcers (ABC): Al Michaels, Frank Gifford, and Dan Dierdorf

== Standings ==
NFC East
	W	L	T	PCT	PF	PA	STK
^{(1)} Dallas Cowboys	12	4	0	.750	376	229	W5
^{(4)} New York Giants	11	5	0	.688	288	205	L2
Philadelphia Eagles	8	8	0	.500	293	315	W3
Phoenix Cardinals	7	9	0	.438	326	269	W3
Washington Redskins	4	12	0	.250	230	345	L2
