= 1991 Philadelphia Eagles season =

NFL team season

- Owner: Norman Braman
- General manager: Harry Gamble
- Head coach: Rich Kotite
- Offensive coordinator: Rich Kotite
- Defensive coordinator: Bud Carson
- Home stadium: Veterans Stadium

Results
- Record: 10–6
- Division place: 3rd NFC East
- Playoffs: Did not qualify

Uniform
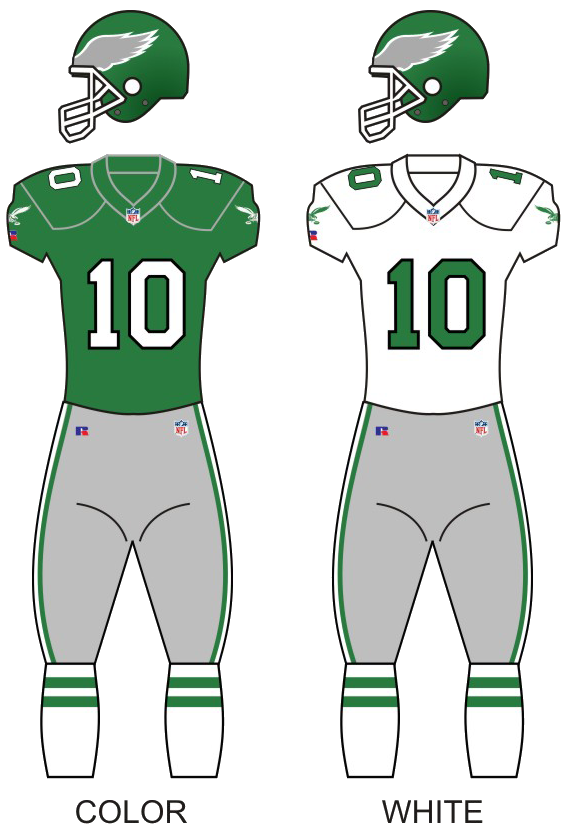

The 1991 Philadelphia Eagles season was the franchise's fifty-ninth season in the National Football League.

Despite having a 10–6 record and finishing with the top-ranked defense in the NFL, the Eagles failed to make the playoffs. During Week 1, quarterback Randall Cunningham was lost for the season with a knee injury. After the season, Rod Harris retired.

== Background ==
Statistics site Football Outsiders ranks the 1991 Eagles, coordinated by Bud Carson, as the greatest defensive team in its ranking's history. According to Football Outsiders:

The 1991 Eagles completely lap the field in terms of defensive DVOA. Only the 2002 Bucs had a better pass defense, and only the 2000 Ravens had a better run defense, and the Eagles were much more balanced than either of those teams.

It's crazy to imagine how few points the Eagles might have given up if they were playing with a halfway-decent offense instead of losing Randall Cunningham to a torn ACL in the first game of the season. The Eagles were lucky to have the lovable and fiercely competitive Jim McMahon for 11 starts, plus Jeff Kemp for two and Brad Goebel for two. McMahon was pretty terrific ... but the other two quarterbacks were awful, especially Goebel who had no touchdowns with six interceptions. And the running game was dreadful, with 3.1 yards per carry as a team.

Still, the Eagles were fifth in the league in points allowed, and first in yards allowed by nearly 400 yards – and the team that was second in yards allowed is also on that top-ten defenses list, the 1991 New Orleans Saints. The Eagles allowed 3.9 yards per play, where no other team allowed fewer than 4.5. As bad as their running game was, their run defense was even better, allowing 3.0 yards per carry. Three-fourths of the starting defensive line was All-Pro (Reggie White, Jerome Brown, and Clyde Simmons). Linebacker Seth Joyner and cornerback Eric Allen made the Pro Bowl as well.

== Overview ==
=== A "real" fresh start ===
On January 8, team owner Norman Braman opted not to renew the contract of Buddy Ryan, the Eagles' head coach since 1986. On the same day, Braman promoted then-offensive coordinator Rich Kotite, making him the eighteenth head coach in the club's history. The team opened with a 3–1 mark, its best start since 1981, despite having lost Cunningham for the year due to a knee injury that was sustained in Green Bay thanks during an opening day-hit by Bryce Paup. After taking over and leading the Eagles to a solid start, backup QB Jim McMahon was also injured in Game 5 during a shutout loss to the Redskins.

=== A winless October ===
With McMahon sidelined, the Birds offense stalled completely during a stretch of eleven straight quarters without scoring a touchdown that culminated in a four-game skid. By mid-season, Philadelphia had used five different quarterbacks, including rookie Brad Goebel, former Jets backup Pat Ryan and former Niners third-stringer Jeff Kemp in eight games and saw its record sink to 3–5. Bleeding Green Nation ranked it as one of the worst Eagles backup QB seasons in the team's history, illustrating how the defense would have supported better quarterback play to several victories.

=== A relatively healthy McMahon returns ===
Week ten saw McMahon return to the lineup for a Monday night, 30–7 victory over the defending Super Bowl Champion New York Giants at Veterans Stadium; however, the following week at Municipal Stadium proved to be a tighter-scoring game. The Eagles won 32–30 as Philadelphia spotted Cleveland a 23–0 lead early in the second quarter, before staging a comeback behind a battered McMahon (passing for 341 yards and three touchdowns). Before the game, McMahon's elbow was so swollen, his roommate Ron Heller had to tie his ponytail for him, and then told his lineman he wouldn't be able to play. But Birds trainer Otho Davis used a concoction he calls "Grandma's Goop" on the elbow, enabling McMahon to play.

These wins resurrected the season, and the Birds continued to surge into contention for a playoff berth with a six-game winning streak (the club's longest since the start of '81). This upped the team's record to 9–5.

The signature win of the run was a 13–6 Monday night victory against the Oilers in Houston on December 2, later dubbed the "House of Pain" game for the Eagles' defense-punishing Warren Moon and his teammates.

=== Heart of a champion ===
"In '91, I broke five ribs off my sternum in New York and bruised my heart. I could've punctured it, but it just bruised." -Jim McMahon, 2014

The season-ending rib injury to McMahon in week fifteen (a 19–14 win against the Giants) made way for a devastating loss at home to Dallas in week sixteen, ending Philadelphia's playoff hopes; however, the season was saved by a 10–6 record, allowing the Eagles to join the 49ers as the only NFL clubs to post ten or more wins in each of the last four seasons. Both teams missed the postseason in 1991, despite winning ten games.

=== A defense that rewrote the record books ===
Philadelphia's defense finished the season ranked first in the NFL in fewest passing yards, rushing yards, and total yards allowed. As such, the Eagles became only the fifth club in NFL history and the first since 1975 to accomplish this rare triple.

Five members of that defensive unit represented the Eagles in the Pro Bowl – DEs Reggie White and Clyde Simmons, DT Jerome Brown, and LB Seth Joyner were selected as starters while CB Eric Allen also made the NFC squad. The selection of White, Simmons, and Brown marked only the sixth time in NFL history that three defensive linemen from one team were elected to the Pro Bowl.

In addition, the Eagles' defense led the NFL in sacks and fumble recoveries and tied for the league lead in takeaways. The Eagles' forty-eight defensive takeaways in 1991 tied for the highest number of defensive takeaways in the NFL during the 1990s.

== Offseason ==
=== NFL draft ===
The 1991 NFL draft was held on April 21 and 22, 1991 at the Marriott Marquis hotel in Manhattan, New York. The Eagles with a 10–6 record in 1990 had the nineteenth or twentieth picks in each round. They also held the number eight pick of the first round, choosing Antone Davis, an offensive tackle from the University of Tennessee. The team's first round pick at number nineteen was traded away earlier and acquired by the Green Bay Packers. Over the course of the twelve-round draft, Philadelphia made twelve selections.

1991 Philadelphia Eagles draft
Round	Pick	Player	Position	College	Notes
1	8	Antone Davis	Offensive tackle	Tennessee	Pick acquired from San Diego Chargers
2	48	Jesse Campbell	Defensive back	North Carolina State	
3	75	Rob Selby	Guard	Auburn	
4	104	William Thomas *	Linebacker	Texas A&M	
5	131	Craig Erickson	Quarterback	Miami (FL)	
6	156	Andy Harmon	Defensive tackle	Kent State	Pick acquired from Seattle Seahawks
7	187	James Joseph	Running back	Auburn	
8	216	Scott Kowalkowski	Linebacker	Notre Dame	
9	242	Chuck Weatherspoon	Running back	Houston	
10	271	Eric Harmon	Guard	Clemson	
11	298	Mike Flores	Defensive end	Louisville	
12	327	Darrell Beavers	Defensive back	Morehead State	
Made roster * Made at least one Pro Bowl during career

Other notable events

Following the previous season, head coach Buddy Ryan was fired and replaced by their offensive coordinator Rich Kotite, a position Kotite would hold for the next four seasons.

== Personnel ==
=== Staff / Coaches ===
1991 Philadelphia Eagles staff
Front office: Owner – Norman Braman; President/Chief Operating Officer – Harry Gamble; Director of player personnel – Joe Woolley; Head coaches: Head coach – Rich Kotite; Offensive coaches: Quarterbacks – Zeke Bratkowski; Running backs – Dick Wood; Receivers – Lew Carpenter; Offensive line – Dan Neal; Offensive line – Bill Walsh	Defensive coaches: Defensive coordinator/Secondary – Bud Carson; Defensive line – Dale Haupt; Linebackers – Jim Vechiarella; Defensive assistant – Peter Giunta; Special teams coaches: Special teams – Dave Atkins; Special teams assistant – Peter Giunta; Strength and conditioning: Strength and conditioning – Jim Williams

=== Roster ===
1991 Philadelphia Eagles roster
Quarterbacks (QB): 18 David Archer; 8 Brad Goebel; 16 Jeff Kemp; 9 Jim McMahon; Running backs (RB): 41 Keith Byars; 36 Robert Drummond; 32 James Joseph; 23 Heath Sherman; Wide receivers (WR): 86 Fred Barnett; 81 Roy Green; 80 Rod Harris; 83 Kenny Jackson; 89 Calvin Williams; Tight ends (TE): 88 Keith Jackson; 87 Maurice Johnson	Offensive linemen (OL): 72 David Alexander C; 77 Antone Davis T; 73 Ron Heller T; 62 Dennis McKnight G; 75 Rob Selby G; 63 Daryle Smith T; 66 Ron Solt G; Defensive linemen (DL): 99 Jerome Brown DT; 95 Mike Flores DE; 90 Mike Golic DT; 91 Andy Harmon DE/DT; 74 Mike Pitts DT; 96 Clyde Simmons DE; 92 Reggie White DE	Linebackers (LB): 56 Byron Evans MLB; 54 Britt Hager MLB; 59 Seth Joyner OLB; 57 Scott Kowalkowski OLB; 55 Ken Rose OLB; 52 Jessie Small OLB; 51 William Thomas OLB; Defensive backs (DB): 21 Eric Allen CB; 42 John Booty CB/S; 48 Wes Hopkins FS; 46 Izel Jenkins CB; 38 Rich Miano FS; 29 Bruce Plummer SS; 30 Otis Smith CB; 20 Andre Waters SS; Special teams (ST): 5 Jeff Feagles P; 76 John Hudson LS; 7 Roger Ruzek K	Practice squad: 37 Jesse Campbell S; 47 Ron Goetz LB; 13 Melvin Patterson WR; Reserve: 69 Bruce Collie G (IR); 12 Randall Cunningham QB (IR); 71 Cecil Gray T (IR); 84 Paul Kovell TE (PUP); 35 Chris Mitchell S (PUP); 45 Thomas Sanders RB (IR); 79 Mike Schad G (IR); 85 Mickey Shuler TE (IR); 26 Ben Smith CB (IR); 61 Ben Tamburello C/G (IR); 47 active, 10 inactive, 3 practice squad Rookies in italics

== Preseason ==
Week	Date	Opponent	Result	Record	Venue	Attendance
1	July 28	vs. Buffalo Bills	L 13–17	0–1	Wembley Stadium	50,474
2	August 3	at New York Jets	W 24–10	1–1	Giants Stadium	31,577
3	August 10	at Cincinnati Bengals	W 29–24	2–1	Riverfront Stadium	56,390
4	August 17	Pittsburgh Steelers	W 21–20	3–1	Veterans Stadium	55,764
5	August 23	Indianapolis Colts	W 23–21	4–1	Veterans Stadium	52,687

== Regular season ==
=== Schedule ===
Week	Date	Opponent	Result	Record	Venue	Attendance
1	September 1	at Green Bay Packers	**W** 20–3	1–0	Lambeau Field	58,991
2	September 8	**Phoenix Cardinals**	**L** 10–26	1–1	Veterans Stadium	63,818
3	September 15	at **Dallas Cowboys**	**W** 24–0	2–1	Texas Stadium	62,656
4	September 22	Pittsburgh Steelers	**W** 23–14	3–1	Veterans Stadium	65,511
5	September 30	at **Washington Redskins**	**L** 0–23	3–2	RFK Stadium	55,198
6	October 6	at Tampa Bay Buccaneers	**L** 13–14	3–3	Tampa Stadium	41,219
7	October 13	New Orleans Saints	**L** 6–13	3–4	Veterans Stadium	64,224
8	Bye					
9	October 27	San Francisco 49ers	**L** 7–23	3–5	Veterans Stadium	65,796
10	November 4	**New York Giants**	**W** 30–7	4–5	Veterans Stadium	65,816
11	November 10	at Cleveland Browns	**W** 32–30	5–5	Cleveland Municipal Stadium	72,086
12	November 17	Cincinnati Bengals	**W** 17–10	6–5	Veterans Stadium	63,189
13	November 24	at **Phoenix Cardinals**	**W** 34–14	7–5	Sun Devil Stadium	37,307
14	December 2	at Houston Oilers	**W** 13–6	8–5	Astrodome	62,141
15	December 8	at **New York Giants**	**W** 19–14	9–5	Giants Stadium	76,099
16	December 15	**Dallas Cowboys**	**L** 13–25	9–6	Veterans Stadium	65,854
17	December 22	**Washington Redskins**	**W** 24–22	10–6	Veterans Stadium	58,988
Note: Intra-division opponents are in **bold** text.

=== Game summaries ===
==== Week 1: at Green Bay Packers ====
Quarter	1	2	3	4	Total
**Eagles**	0	13	0	7	**20**
Packers	0	0	3	0	**3**

at Lambeau Field, Green Bay, Wisconsin

- Date: September 1
- Game time: 12:00 p.m.
- Game weather: 60 °F (16 °C), wind 11 mph (18 km/h)
- Referee: Pat Haggerty
- TV announcers (CBS): Brad Nessler and Dan Fouts
- Pro-Football-Reference.com

Game information

**Second quarter**

- Eagles – Roger Ruzek 37-yard field goal – **Eagles 3–0**
- Eagles – Keith Byars 32-yard pass from Jim McMahon (Roger Ruzek kick) – **Eagles 10–0**
- Eagles – Roger Ruzek 40-yard field goal – **Eagles 13–0**

**Third quarter**

- Packers – Chris Jacke 21-yard field goal – **Eagles 13–3**

**Fourth quarter**

- Eagles – Fred Barnett 75-yard pass from Jim McMahon (Roger Ruzek kick) – **Eagles 20–3**

**Eagles**

- Jim McMahon
  17/25, 257 Yds, 2 TD, 2 INT
- Thomas Sanders
  23 Rush, 52 Yds
- Keith Byars
  8 Rec, 111 Yds, TD

**Packers**

- Don Majkowski
  16/42, 201 Yds, 3 INT
- Darrell Thompson
  6 Rush, 16 Yds
- Sterling Sharpe
  6 Rec, 70 Yds

==== Week 3 ====
Team	1	2	3	4	Total
• Eagles	7	10	0	7	24
Cowboys	0	0	0	0	0

- Date: September 15
- Location: Texas Stadium, Irving, Texas
- Game start: 12:00 p.m.
- Game weather: 81 °F (27 °C); wind 13 mph (21 km/h)
- Referee: Gerald Austin
- TV announcers (CBS): Dick Stockton and Merlin Olsen

Scoring summary
Q1	PHI	Fred Barnett 11 yard pass from Jim McMahon (Roger Ruzek kick)	PHI 7–0
Q2	PHI	Roger Ruzek 42 yard field goal	PHI 10–0
Q2	PHI	Robert Drummond 1 yard run (Roger Ruzek kick)	PHI 17–0
Q4	PHI	Keith Byars 6 yard pass from Jim McMahon (Roger Ruzek kick)	PHI 24–0

==== Week 14 ====
Philadelphia Eagles (7–5) at Houston Oilers (9–3)

Quarter	1	2	3	4	Total
Eagles	0	0	10	3	**13**
Oilers	0	3	3	0	**6**

at Astrodome • Houston, Texas

- Date: December 2
- Game time: 9:00 p.m. EST
- Game weather: Indoors (dome)
- Referee: Tom Dooley
- TV announcers (ABC): Al Michaels, Frank Gifford, and Dan Dierdorf
- Pro-Football-Reference.com

Game information

Eagles

- Jim McMahon
  12/20, 84 Yds, INT
- James Joseph
  12 Rush, 56 Yds
- Roy Green
  3 Rec, 44 Yds

Oilers

- Warren Moon
  24/46, 262 Yds
- Allen Pinkett
  6 Rush, 10 Yds
- Ernest Givens
  6 Rec, 89 Yds

The Eagles defense shut down the Oilers' run-and-shoot attack with four sacks, six forced fumbles (five lost) and 21 yards rushing on 11 attempts. Jerome Brown said after the game, "They brought the house, we brought the pain." This would be the Eagles' last road win against the Oilers (who relocated to Tennessee in 1997 and became the Titans two years later) until 2026.

Scoring summary

Quarter	Time	Drive			Team	Scoring information	Score	
Quarter	Time	Plays	Yards	TOP	Team	Scoring information	PHI	HOU
2					Oilers	42-yard field goal by Del Greco	0	3
3					Eagles	23-yard field goal by Ruzek	3	3
3					Eagles	Jackson 21-yard touchdown reception from Kemp, Ruzek kick good	10	3
4					Oilers	47-yard field goal by Del Greco	10	6
4					Eagles	29-yard field goal by Ruzek	13	6
"TOP" = time of possession. For other American football terms, see Glossary of American football.							13	6

=== Standings ===
NFC East
	W	L	T	PCT	DIV	CONF	PF	PA	STK
^{(1)} Washington Redskins	14	2	0	.875	6–2	10–2	485	224	L1
^{(5)} Dallas Cowboys	11	5	0	.688	5–3	8–4	342	310	W5
Philadelphia Eagles	10	6	0	.625	5–3	6–6	285	244	W1
New York Giants	8	8	0	.500	3–5	5–7	281	297	W1
Phoenix Cardinals	4	12	0	.250	1–7	3–11	196	344	L8

== Awards and honors ==
NFL Comeback Player of the Year – Jim McMahon QB

UPI NFC Defensive Player of the Year – Reggie White DE
