= Eric Allen =

American football player and coach (born 1965)

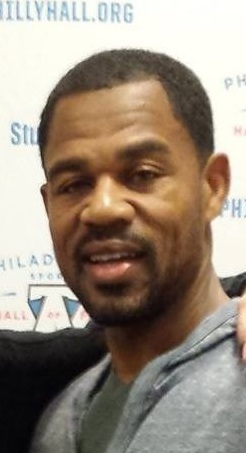
- Allen in 2018

No. 21
- Position: Cornerback

Personal information
- Born: November 22, 1965 (age 60); San Diego, California, U.S.
- Listed height: 5 ft 10 in (1.78 m)
- Listed weight: 184 lb (83 kg)

Career information
- High school: Point Loma (San Diego)
- College: Arizona State (1984–1987)
- NFL draft: 1988: 2nd round, 30th overall pick

Career history

Playing
- Philadelphia Eagles (1988–1994); New Orleans Saints (1995–1997); Oakland Raiders (1998–2001)

Coaching
- San Diego Fleet (2019) Defensive backs coach

Awards and highlights
- First-team All-Pro (1989); 2× Second-team All-Pro (1991, 1993); 6× Pro Bowl (1989, 1991–1995); PFWA NFL All-Rookie Team (1988); Philadelphia Eagles 75th Anniversary Team; Philadelphia Eagles Hall of Fame

Career NFL statistics
- Tackles: 787
- Interceptions: 54
- Interception yards: 826
- Pass deflections: 40
- Forced fumbles: 5
- Fumble recoveries: 7
- Sacks: 3
- Defensive touchdowns: 9
- Stats at Pro Football Reference
- Pro Football Hall of Fame

Eric Andre Allen (born November 22, 1965) is an American former professional football player who was a cornerback in the National Football League (NFL) for the Philadelphia Eagles, New Orleans Saints, and Oakland Raiders from 1988 to 2001. A six-time Pro Bowl selection, Allen retired after the 2001 season and is currently an NFL analyst for Pac-12 Networks. In his NFL career, he recorded 54 interceptions for 826 yards and eight touchdowns, while also recovering seven fumbles. His 54 interceptions is tied for 21st in NFL history. He was inducted into the Pro Football Hall of Fame in 2025.

In 2019, he served as the defensive backs coach for the San Diego Fleet of the Alliance of American Football (AAF).

== Early life ==
Allen played high school football at Point Loma High School under legendary coach Bennie Edens.

== College career ==
Allen played college football at Arizona State University. In Allen's four-year career at Arizona State, he had 15 interceptions, two of which were returned for touchdowns. He was a key member of the team that lead the Sun Devils to a 1987 Rose Bowl win over the Michigan Wolverines.

== Professional career ==
Pre-draft measurables
Height	Weight	Hand span	40-yard dash	10-yard split	20-yard split	20-yard shuttle	Vertical jump	Broad jump	Bench press
5 ft 9 3/4 in (1.77 m)	181 lb (82 kg)	9 1/2 in (0.24 m)	4.46 s	1.58 s	2.62 s	4.19 s	30.5 in (0.77 m)	9 ft 4 in (2.84 m)	14 reps

=== Philadelphia Eagles ===
==== 1988 season ====
The Philadelphia Eagles selected Allen in the second round (30th overall) in the 1988 NFL draft. He was the third cornerback drafted, following Rickey Dixon and Terry McDaniel, and was also the first of three cornerbacks the Eagles drafted in 1988, along with fifth-round pick (122nd overall) Eric Everett and 11th-round pick (288th overall) Izel Jenkins.

On June 19, 1988, the Eagles signed Allen to a four–year, $1.05 million rookie contract that included an initial signing bonus of $260,000.

He entered training camp slated as the No. 2 starting cornerback, taking over after disappointing seasons from Elbert Foules and William Frizzell. Throughout training camp and the preseason, Allen performed well and was named a starting cornerback to begin the season, alongside Roynell Young.

On September 10, 1988, Allen made his professional regular season debut in the Philadelphia Eagles’ season-opener at the Tampa Bay Buccaneers and made four solo tackles, one pass deflection, and had the first interception of his career on a pass by Vinny Testaverde as they won 41–14. In Week 7, he set a season-high with eight combined tackles (five solo), had a pass break-up, and intercepted a pass attempt by Don Strock during a 3–19 loss at the Cleveland Browns. On November 13, 1988, Allen recorded one solo tackle, set a season-high with three pass deflections, and intercepted a pass by Bubby Brister during a 27–26 win at the Pittsburgh Steelers. He started in all 16 games as a rookie throughout the entire 1988 NFL season and recorded 57 combined tackles (53 solo), 11 pass deflections, and made five interceptions.

==== 1989 season ====
On January 11, 1989, defensive coordinator Wade Phillips accepted the same position with the Denver Broncos. Defensive backs coach Jeff Fisher was promoted to take over as his replacement. Head coach Buddy Ryan named Allen the No. 1 starting cornerback to begin the season following the departure of Roydell Young. Fellow second-year cornerback Izel Jenkins was paired with Allen for the season, replacing Young.

On September 17, 1989, Allen set a season-high with five solo tackles, made two pass deflections, and intercepted a pass by Mark Rypien during a 42–27 win at the Washington Redskins. In Week 6, he recorded three solo tackles, set a season-high with three pass deflections, and picked off a pass thrown by Tom Tupa during a 17–5 victory at the Phoenix Cardinals. In Week 11, Allen made three solo tackles, one pass deflection, recovered a fumble, and intercepted a pass by Wade Wilson as the Eagles defeated the Minnesota Vikings 9–10. The following week, he made two solo tackles, one pass deflection, and picked off a pass by Troy Aikman during a 27–0 victory at the Dallas Cowboys in Week 12. On December 3, 1989, Allen broke up a pass and made his eighth interception of the season on a pass attempt by Phil Simms during a 24–17 victory at the New York Giants. He finished the season with a total of 48 combined tackles (32 solo), 12 pass deflections, and set a career-high with eight interceptions in 15 games and 15 starts.

==== 1990 season ====
The Philadelphia Eagles selected cornerback Ben Smith in the first round (22nd overall) of the 1990 NFL draft. He returned to training camp slated as the de facto No. 1 starting cornerback. Head coach Buddy Ryan named Allen and Ben Smith the starting cornerbacks to begin the season. In Week 8, he recorded five solo tackles and set a season-high with three pass deflections during a 21–20 victory at the Dallas Cowboys. In Week 13, he set a season-high with six solo tackles during a 23–30 loss at the Buffalo Bills. On December 23, 1990, Allen made four solo tackles, two pass deflections, set a career-high with two interceptions off passes thrown by Babe Laufenberg, and returned one for the first touchdown of his career as the Eagles defeated the Dallas Cowboys 3–17. He intercepted a pass Babe Laufenberg threw to wide receiver Michael Irvin and returned it 35 yards to score his first touchdown midway through the fourth quarter. He finished the season with 58 combined tackles (56 solo), 14 pass deflections, and three interceptions in 16 games and 15 starts.

The Philadelphia Eagles finished second in the NFC East at the conclusion of the 1990 NFL season and earned a Wild-Card berth for their third consecutive playoff appearance. On January 5, 1991, Allen started in the NFC Wild-Card Game and made three solo tackles, one pass deflection, and intercepted a pass by Mark Rypien as the Eagles lost 20–6 to the Washington Redskins.

==== 1991 season ====
On January 8, 1991, the Philadelphia Eagles fired head coach Buddy Ryan three days after their third first round playoff exit in-a-row. Owner Norman Braman immediately announced offensive coordinator Rich Kotite would be promoted to be the new head coach. Defensive coordinator Jeff Fisher was the only other candidate to replace Buddy Ryan and was offered to retain his position, but opted to depart from the organization. After a successful first season pairing together, defensive coordinator Bud Carson chose to retain Allen and Ben Smith as the starters to begin the season.

On September 1, 1991, Allen started in the Eagles' season-opener at the Green Bay Packers and recorded three solo tackles and intercepted a pass by Don Majkowski as they won 20–3. In Week 6, he set a season-high with three pass deflections and intercepted a pass attempt by Vinny Testaverde during a 13–14 loss at the Tampa Bay Buccaneers. In Week 11, No. 2 starting cornerback Ben Smith tore his ACL during a 32–30 victory at the Cleveland Browns and was subsequently placed on season-ending injured reserve. In Week 14, he set a season-high with seven solo tackles and had three pass deflections during a 13–6 victory at the Houston Oilers. He started all 16 games throughout the 1991 NFL season and made 37 combined tackles (34 solo), 20 pass deflections, five interceptions, and one fumble recovery. He was selected for the 1992 Pro Bowl, marking his second Pro Bowl of his career.

Throughout the season, the Eagles' defense were dubbed "Gang Green" due to their relentless pressure. Following the departure of Buddy Ryan, the Eagles' defense continued to use his 46 defense, but defensive coordinator Bud Carson would effectively mix in different defensive schemes, fronts, coverages, and blitzes. Bud Carson was credited for the arrival of the Cover 2 defense on the NFL. The defense was built around a defensive line that included Reggie White, Jerome Brown, Mike Golic, and Clyde Simmons. The linebacker corps had Seth Joyner, Jessie Small, Byron Evans, and rookie William Thomas among them. The secondary consisted of cornerback duo Allen and Ben Smith starting alongside safeties Wes Hopkins and Andre Waters. The defense quickly began diminishing starting with Ben Smith suffering a torn ACL in Week 10 and was profoundly effected by the sudden death of Jerome Brown before training camp in June 1992.

==== 1992 season ====
Throughout the offseason, Allen and the Eagles worked on reaching an agreement. Upon the beginning of training camp, both parties were unable to reach an agreement. After two Pro Bowl selections, Allen demanded to receive a salary that would make him one of the highest paid cornerbacks. He decided to hold out of training camp and refused to play until his demands were met. On September 3, 1992, the Philadelphia Eagles re-signed Allen to a three–year, $3.60 million contract. Allen said the key to the agreement was "making me one of the three highest-paid defensive backs and keeping me there. It was a compromise." Head coach Rich Kotite named Allen and Izel Jenkins the starting cornerbacks to begin the season, as Ben Smith would remain inactive for the entire season due to his torn ACL.

After the five games, defensive coordinator Bud Carson opted to bench No. 2 starting cornerback Izel Jenkins and replaced him with starting free safety John Booty temporarily for seven consecutive games (Weeks 7–13). On November 8, 1992, Allen recorded six solo tackles, two pass deflections, and set a season-high with two interceptions off passes by Todd Marinovich as the Eagles defeated the Los Angeles Raiders 10–31. In Week 15, he set a season-high with three pass deflections and intercepted a pass by Stan Gelbaugh during a 20–17 overtime victory at the Seattle Seahawks. He started all 16 games throughout the season and finished with 78 combined tackles (55 solo), ten pass deflections, four interceptions, and two fumble recoveries.

The Philadelphia Eagles finished the 1992 NFL season with an 11–5 record to earn a Wild-Card berth. On January 3, 1993, Allen started in the NFC Wild-Card Game and recorded three combined tackles (two solo), led the game with four pass deflections, made two interceptions, and sealed a 36–20 victory at the New Orleans Saints by intercepting a pass by Bobby Hebert and returned it 18 yards for a touchdown nearing the end of the fourth quarter. The following week, the Eagles were eliminated from the playoffs after they lost 10–34 at the Dallas Cowboys in the Divisional Round. The Cowboys would go on to win Super Bowl XXVII to kickoff their dynasty.

==== 1993 season ====
He returned to training camp slated as the de facto No. 1 starting cornerback. After having four different players start alongside him at cornerback the previous season, the Eagles opted to select cornerback Derrick Frazier in the third round (75th overall) of the 1993 NFL draft. Head coach Rich Kotite named Allen a starting cornerback to begin season and paired him with Mark McMillian who won the role of the No. 2 starting cornerback after rookie Derrick Frazier injured his knee in the preseason.

On September 12, 1993, Allen made two solo tackles, a pass deflection, and sparked a fourth quarter by intercepting a pass by Brett Favre on the first play of the fourth quarter as the Eagles were trailing 7–17 and returned it 16 yards to the Packers' 26–yard line. His interception sparked a ten-point, fourth-quarter comeback as the Eagles scored 13 points unanswered, leading to a 20–17 victory at the Green Bay Packers. The following week, he made three combined tackles (two solo), a pass deflection, and returned an interception he made on a pass Cary Conklin threw to running back Earnest Byner for a 29–yard touchdown as the Eagles defeated the Washington Redskins 31–34 in Week 3.

On October 3, 1993, he made six combined tackles (five solo), two pass deflections, and had a game-winning pick-six to lead the Eagles to a 35–30 fourth quarter comeback victory at the New York Jets. Allen intercepted a pass attempt by Boomer Esiason to wide receiver Chris Burkett and returned it 94 yards for a touchdown as the Eagles were trailing 28–30 midway through the fourth quarter. Starting quarterback Randall Cunningham had fractured his fibula in the second quarter and was sideline with crutches as Allen scored and celebrated by running up to Cunningham and handing him the ball. The ensuing 94–yard touchdown return was declared "Greatest Interception Return in NFL History" by Steve Sabol of NFL Films. In Week 15, he recorded five solo tackles, set a season-high with three pass deflections, and picked off a pass Jim Kelly threw to wide receiver Bill Brooks during a 10–7 loss to the Buffalo Bills.

On December 26, 1993, Allen had another amazing performance when he made three pass deflections, set a season-high with two interceptions, and returned both for touchdowns as the Eagles defeated the New Orleans Saints 26–37. During the third quarter, Allen intercepted Steve Walsh's pass attempt to wide receiver Eric Martin and returned it 33 yards for a touchdown to increase the lead to 24–12. He set a career-high with his fourth pick-six of the season by picking off Steve Walsh again on a pass to wide receiver Torrance Small and had a 25–yard return for a touchdown. He four pick-sixes tied an NFL recorded for the most pick-sixes in a single season, along with safeties Jim Kearney (1972) and Ken Houston (1971). In 2023, Cowboys' cornerback DaRon Bland broke the surpassed Allen with five interceptions returned for touchdowns in a single season. In Week 18, he set a season-high with seven solo tackles and had one pass break-up during a 37–34 overtime victory at the San Francisco 49ers. He started in all 16 games throughout the season and finished with 64 combined tackles (53 solo), 17 pass deflections, six interceptions, and four touchdowns. He was selected to appear in the 1994 Pro Bowl, marking the fourth of his career.

==== 1994 season ====
He returned as the No. 1 starting cornerback and was paired with Mark McMillan. In Week 8, he set a season-high with five solo tackles, made one pass deflection, and intercepted a pass Cody Carlson threw to wide receiver Haywood Jeffires as the Eagles defeated the Houston Oilers 6–21. In Week 10, he set a season-high with six combined tackles (four solo) during a 7–17 victory against the Arizona Cardinals. In Week 17, Allen recorded five solo tackles and set a season-high with three pass deflections during a 30–33 loss at the Cincinnati Bengals. He started in all 16 games and recorded 57 combined tackles (46 solo), 14 pass deflections, and made three interceptions.

Following the conclusion of the 1994 NFL season, Allen became an unrestricted free agent allowing him to sign with any team. The Philadelphia Eagles designated Allen with their transition tag which gave them an opportunity to retain him if they agreed to match any contract offers that were submitted by any interested teams within seven days.

=== New Orleans Saints ===
==== 1995 season ====
On March 18, 1995, the New Orleans Saints submitted a contract offer sheet, but were only able to acquire Allen if the Eagles declined to match their offer within seven days. The following day, the Eagles officially declined to match the Saints' contract offer. The same day, the New Orleans Saints officially signed Allen to a five–year, $14 million contract that included an initial signing bonus of $4.25 million. Allen was acquired in order to provide stability as a veteran cornerback following the departures of Reggie Jones and Carl Lee. He entered training camp slated as the No. 1 starting cornerback under defensive coordinator Monte Kiffin. Head coach Jim E. Mora named Allen and Jimmy Spencer as the starting cornerbacks to begin the season.

On November 5, 1995, Allen made four solo tackles, one pass deflection, and had his first interception with the Saints on a pass attempt thrown by Chris Miller to wide receiver Isaac Bruce during a 10–19 victory against the St. Louis Rams. In Week 12, he set a season-high with eight solo tackles during a 24–43 loss at the Minnesota Vikings. On November 26, 1995, Allen recorded two combined tackles (one solo), set a season-high with two pass deflections, and intercepted a pass Kerry Collins to wide receiver Eric Guliford late in the fourth quarter as the Saints defeated the Carolina Panthers 26–34. He started in all 16 games for the fifth consecutive season and recorded 59 combined tackles (44 solo), six pass deflections, and two interceptions. He was selected for the 1996 Pro Bowl.

==== 1996 season ====
The Saints promoted linebackers coach Jim Haslett to defensive coordinator after the departure of Monte Kiffin. Former Number 2 starting cornerback Jimmy Spencer signed with the Bengals as a free agent. The Saints subsequently signed Mark McMillian, who previously played alongside Allen with the Eagles, and also selected cornerback Alex Molden in the first round (11th overall) of the 1996 NFL draft. Head coach Jim Mora named Allen and Mark McMillian the starting cornerbacks to begin the season. On October 21, 1996, head coach Jim Mora announced his resignation after the Saints fell to a 2–6 record. Linebackers coach Rick Venturi was appointed to interim head coach. In Week 7, he set season-highs with seven solo tackles and three pass deflections during a 27–24 victory at the Chicago Bears. On December 21, 1996, Allen made five combined tackles (four solo), three pass deflections, and had his lone interception of the season on a pass Tony Banks threw to Isaac Bruce during a 13–14 loss at the St. Louis Rams. He started in all 16 games throughout the 1996 NFL season and recorded 51 combined tackles (48 solo), 19 pass deflections, and one interception.

==== 1997 season ====
On January 28, 1997, the New Orleans Saints announced their decision to hire Mike Ditka to be their new head coach. He returned to training camp slated as the No. 1 starting cornerback under defensive coordinator Zaven Yaralian. Head coach Mike Ditka named Allen and Alex Molden the starting cornerbacks to begin the season following the departure of Mark McMillian. On August 31, 1997, Allen started in the Saints' season-opener at St. Louis Rams and recorded four solo tackles, one pass deflection, and intercepted a pass Tony Banks to wide receiver Torrance Small as they lost 24–38. In Week 3, Allen and head coach Mike Ditka got into a heated argument and had to be restrained by teammates as the Saints were being shutout 0–23 at the San Francisco 49ers. In Week 4, Allen recorded five combined tackles (four solo), set a season-high with two pass deflections, and intercepted a pass attempt from Scott Mitchell to Herman Moore during a 17–35 victory against the Detroit Lions. In Week 12, he set a season-high with six solo tackles as the Saints defeated the Seattle Seahawks in overtime 20–17. He started in all 16 games and recorded 50 combined tackles (45 solo), six pass deflections, and two interceptions. Following the end of the season, Allen immediately requested a trade to another team although he had one year remaining on his contract as he was desiring to join a playoff contender as he was nearing the end of his career. Head coach Mike Ditka asked if he had any preferences and Allen stated his ideal team were the San Francisco 49ers, but was rebuffed as the 49ers were a direct division rival. Raiders' defensive coordinator Willie Shaw had recruited to play at Arizona State while he was their defensive backs coach, but departed shortly after. Shaw asked Allen to consider joining the Raiders and set up a visit although Allen was not interested. During the visit, Allen met with Shaw and was told they planned to draft a cornerback to play alongside him.

=== Oakland Raiders ===
==== 1998 season ====
On March 5, 1998, the Oakland Raiders traded a fourth-round pick (97th overall) in the 1998 NFL draft to the New Orleans Saints in return for Eric Allen. The Raiders selected cornerback Charles Woodson fourth overall in the 1998 NFL Draft.

On April 15, 1998, the Oakland Raiders signed Allen to a three–year, $8 million contract extension that included a signing bonus of $1 million.

On October 4, 1998, Allen made five solo tackles, two pass deflections, and intercepted a pass Jake Plummer threw to fullback Larry Centers during a 23–20 victory at the Arizona Cardinals. In Week 8, Allen recorded two solo tackles, set a season-high with four pass deflections, and intercepted a pass Jeff Blake threw to Carl Pickens during a 10–27 win against the Cincinnati Bengals. On Week 9, he set a season-high with eight solo tackles and made one pass deflection during a 31–18 victory at the Seattle Seahawks.

(On the impact of losing Allen)
“It's huge! The guy's one of the leaders of the team. He just took over the defense."

— Jeff George

In Week 11, he made one solo tackle, a pass deflection, and intercepted a pass Warren Moon threw to wide receiver Joey Galloway, but sustained an injury while returning it, exiting in the second quarter as the Raiders defeated the Seattle Seahawks 17–20. On November 18, 1998, the Raiders officially placed him on injured reserve for the remainder of the season as he would require surgery to repair the torn ACL in his left knee. He subsequently remained inactive for the last six games of the season (Weeks 12–17). His injury ended a streak of 136 consecutive starts and was the first game he missed since 1989. He finished the season with 35 combined tackles (33 solo), 17 pass deflections, and five interceptions in ten games and ten starts. At the time of his injury, the Raiders had a 7–3 record before losing five of the last six games to finish 8–8.

==== 1999 season ====
He returned to training camp slated as the No. 2 starting cornerback. Head coach Jon Gruden named Allen and Charles Woodson the starting cornerbacks to begin the season. In Week 7, he recorded three combined tackles (two solo), made two pass deflection, and intercepted a pass attempt by Rick Mirer as the Raiders defeated the New York Jets 24–23. In Week 11, he set a season-high with nine solo tackles and made one pass deflection during a 21–27 loss at the Denver Broncos. On December 26, 1999, he recorded five combined tackles (four solo) and set a season-high with three pass deflections during a 34–37 loss against the Kansas City Chiefs. He started in all 16 games throughout the season and finished with 61 combined tackles (52 solo), 17 pass deflections, and three interceptions.

==== 2000 season ====
On January 12, 2000, the Raiders abruptly fired defensive coordinator Willie Shaw unexpectedly after deciding to promote Chuck Bresnahan to defensive coordinator for the upcoming season.

But he came back strong in 2000 and had a season to remember, with six interceptions, including a team-record three for touchdowns. His teammates honored him with the first annual Eric Turner award for the Raiders' most outstanding defensive player. The award was created in the memory of the Oakland free safety who died of abdominal cancer in May 2000.

Through the 2001 season, Allen played in 216 of a possible 224 games.

In 2009, Allen also was inducted by the San Diego Hall of Champions into the Breitbard Hall of Fame honoring San Diego's finest athletes both on and off the playing surface.

== NFL career statistics ==
=== Regular season ===
Legend
	Led the league
**Bold**	Career high

Year	Team	Games		Tackles				Interceptions						Fumbles	
Year	Team	GP	GS	Cmb	Solo	Ast	Sck	Int	Yds	Avg	Lng	TD	PD	FF	FR
1988	PHI	16	16	65	—	—	0.0	5	76	15.2	21	0	—	0	0
1989	PHI	15	15	48	—	—	0.0	**8**	38	4.8	18	0	—	0	0
1990	PHI	16	15	63	—	—	0.0	3	37	12.3	35	1	—	0	0
1991	PHI	16	16	39	—	—	0.0	5	20	4.0	8	0	—	0	1
1992	PHI	16	16	72	—	—	0.0	4	49	12.2	36	0	—	0	**2**
1993	PHI	16	16	64	52	6	**2.0**	6	**201**	**33.5**	**94**	**4**	17	**3**	0
1994	PHI	16	16	57	46	11	0.0	3	61	20.3	33	0	14	0	1
1995	NO	16	16	59	44	**14**	0.0	2	28	14.0	28	0	6	0	0
1996	NO	16	16	51	48	3	0.0	1	33	33.0	33	0	**19**	0	0
1997	NO	16	16	50	45	5	0.0	2	27	13.5	27	0	8	0	0
1998	OAK	10	10	35	33	2	0.0	5	59	11.8	22	0	17	0	0
1999	OAK	16	16	61	52	9	0.0	3	33	11.0	31	0	16	0	1
2000	OAK	16	15	**68**	**62**	6	1.0	6	145	24.2	50	3	14	0	0
2001	OAK	16	15	55	49	6	0.0	1	19	19.0	19	0	9	2	1
Career		217	214	787	431	62	3.0	54	826	16.3	94	8	120	5	6

=== Postseason ===
Year	Team	Games		Tackles				Interceptions						Fumbles	
Year	Team	GP	GS	Cmb	Solo	Ast	Sck	Int	Yds	Avg	Lng	TD	PD	FF	FR
1988	PHI	1	1	0	—	—	0.0	0	0	—	0	0	—	0	0
1989	PHI	1	0	0	—	—	0.0	0	0	—	0	0	—	0	0
1990	PHI	1	1	0	—	—	0.0	1	3	3.0	3	0	—	0	0
1992	PHI	2	2	0	—	—	0.0	**2**	**22**	**11.0**	**18**	**1**	—	0	0
2000	OAK	2	2	2	2	0	0.0	1	0	0.0	0	0	1	0	0
2001	OAK	2	2	**6**	**4**	**2**	0.0	0	0	—	0	0	**5**	0	0
Career		9	8	8	6	2	0.0	4	25	6.3	18	1	6	0	0

== Post-NFL career ==
=== Television career ===
Allen joined ESPN in August 2002 as an NFL studio analyst. Allen primarily appears on ESPN's "Sportscenter" as an NFL analyst.

Allen has had appearances as a college football analyst on the Pac-12 Networks football shows, as well as for the station's flagship show "Sports Report" as a football analyst.

=== Coaching career ===
On December 19, 2018, Allen was named defensive backs coach for the San Diego Fleet of the Alliance of American Football.

== Personal life ==
He now lives in San Diego, California with his wife Lynn Allen, with whom he has four children.
