= Antone Davis =

American football player (born 1967)

No. 77, 78, 76
- Positions: Offensive tackle, guard

Personal information
- Born: February 28, 1967 (age 59); Fort Valley, Georgia, U.S.
- Listed height: 6 ft 4 in (1.93 m)
- Listed weight: 330 lb (150 kg)

Career information
- High school: Peach County (Fort Valley)
- College: Tennessee
- NFL draft: 1991: 1st round, 8th overall pick

Career history
- Philadelphia Eagles (1991–1995); Atlanta Falcons (1996–1997); Green Bay Packers (1999)*
- * Offseason or practice squad member only

Awards and highlights
- PFWA All-Rookie Team (1991); Unanimous All-American (1990); Jacobs Blocking Trophy (1990); First-team All-SEC (1990)

Career NFL statistics
- Games played: 97
- Games started: 87
- Fumble recoveries: 1
- Stats at Pro Football Reference

Antone Eugene Davis (born February 28, 1967) is an American former professional football player who was an offensive tackle and guard in the National Football League (NFL) for seven seasons during the 1990s. He played one year of football for Peach County High School in Fort Valley, Georgia, and was recruited out of high school by the Tennessee Military Institute, for whom he played one year of college football. He earned a full scholarship to play for the Tennessee Volunteers the following year and started at left guard during his sophomore year in 1988. He was moved to right offensive tackle before his junior year and earned unanimous All-American honors as a senior in 1990. He finished as a finalist for the 1990 Outland Trophy as well, and was drafted by the NFL's Philadelphia Eagles as the eighth overall selection in the 1991 NFL draft.

Davis played for five seasons with the Eagles, who traded two first-round draft picks to pick Davis. In his rookie season in 1991, he started in fifteen games, missing one start in week seven due to his benching. He started in fifteen games again in 1992, missing one game due to a knee sprain. Davis started in every game for the Eagles in 1993 at right tackle, but was moved inside to left guard in 1994 following the team's pick of offensive tackle Bernard Williams in the 1994 NFL draft. Davis struggled at his new position and was benched again for the final two games of the season. He began the 1995 season as a backup, but injuries forced him to start in the final thirteen games of the season. Considered a draft bust in Philadelphia, Davis signed with the Atlanta Falcons in 1996 and spent two seasons with the team. After his retirement from football, he worked in the food industry as a restaurant owner and manager. He finished as the runner-up on the twelfth season of the reality television show The Biggest Loser in 2011.

== Early life ==
Davis grew up as the youngest of eight children in Fort Valley, Georgia, and attended Peach County High School in Fort Valley. His father, Milton Trice, was raised in North Philadelphia, and moved when he was seventeen years old to Georgia. Davis worked many jobs in high school, including work in the high school cafeteria. He had attendance issues that caused him to be held back in ninth grade. He weighed about 300 pounds (140 kg) at the age of fourteen. Unable to play football as a sophomore because of his grades, Davis refocused and brought his grades up. He played football as a junior, but could not play as a senior due to his class graduating the year prior.

== College career ==
Davis played college football for one season in 1986 at the Tennessee Military Institute, a preparatory school near Sweetwater, Tennessee, that recruited him out of high school after graduation. He received a full scholarship to the University of Tennessee the next year. Following the 1987 season and the graduation of the Volunteers' two starting offensive guards, Harry Galbreath and John Bruhin, Davis was expected to start for the Volunteers at left guard in 1988 as a sophomore. An ankle injury suffered during the season opener against Georgia on September 3 caused him to miss the next four games, before he was able to return against Alabama on October 15. Before the start of the 1989 season, Davis was moved to right offensive tackle. In the 1990 season, he helped running back Tony Thompson lead the Southeastern Conference (SEC) in rushing with 1,261 yards. He was named as a finalist for the Outland Trophy in November 1990 as a senior, but lost out to defensive tackle Russell Maryland from Miami. Davis earned unanimous All-America honors, receiving first-team honors from the Associated Press, United Press International, Walter Camp Football Foundation, American Football Coaches Association, Football Writers Association of America, Scripps–Howard Newspapers, Football News, and The Sporting News. He also earned All-SEC honors. Following the 1990 season, Davis won the Jacobs Blocking Trophy in January 1991, as the best blocker in the SEC. He played in the Hula Bowl on January 18, 1991, for the East squad.

Davis earned the University of Tennessee's Chancellor Citation for his community service efforts during his college career, including his contributions with the "Just Say No" campaign, the American Cancer Society, Big Brothers Big Sisters of America, and the Knoxville Community Parks Association. He graduated from the University of Tennessee with a degree in urban studies in December 1990.

== Professional career ==
=== Philadelphia Eagles ===
==== 1991 season ====
Pre-draft measurables
Height	Weight	Arm length	Hand span	40-yard dash	10-yard split	20-yard split	20-yard shuttle	Vertical jump	Broad jump	Bench press
6 ft 4 1/2 in (1.94 m)	327 lb (148 kg)	32 in (0.81 m)	10 3/8 in (0.26 m)	5.18 s	1.82 s	3.02 s	4.75 s	27.5 in (0.70 m)	8 ft 2 in (2.49 m)	26 reps

At the NFL Scouting Combine in February 1991, Davis arrived weighing 338 pounds (153 kg) (25 pounds (11 kg) overweight). He ran a 5.2-second 40-yard dash, but received criticism for weight issues and his up-and-down personality. He had 26 repetitions in the bench press. Before the draft, analyst Mel Kiper, Jr. said, "Davis has slipped a bit. He's still a Top 10 pick, but his recent workouts haven't been good." John Butler, the Buffalo Bills' director of player personnel said Davis was "a blueprint tackle, with size and everything else."

Davis was selected by the Philadelphia Eagles as the eighth overall selection in the 1991 NFL draft, one pick after former Tennessee teammate Charles McRae was selected by the Tampa Bay Buccaneers. It was the first time in NFL history that two former college teammates who played the same position were drafted back-to-back. Davis was the first draft pick by new Eagles head coach Rich Kotite. The Eagles traded up from the 19th pick with the Green Bay Packers to select Davis, giving Green Bay the 19th selection (which was used on cornerback Vinnie Clark) and a first-round pick in the 1992 NFL draft. The pick in 1992 ended up being the 17th selection, and the Packers traded it to the Atlanta Falcons for quarterback Brett Favre on February 10, 1992. The Falcons then traded the pick to the Dallas Cowboys (who used it to select cornerback Kevin Smith) and received the 19th selection (used to select running back Tony Smith) and a fourth-round pick (used to select cornerback Frankie Smith).

After holding out for 21 days, Davis was signed initially to a contract designed as a temporary compromise in order to get him into training camp on August 5, 1991. It was speculated that the reason behind Davis' holdout and the temporary compromise was that Davis and his agent wanted to see what McRae, who also held out with the Buccaneers, signed for first. Davis was not allowed to practice with the team until he was under contract, thus the compromise contract enabled him to practice while still work to get a long-term deal done. The compromise was a one-year contract with an option for a second year, and Davis received US$600,000 in signing the first contract. He was able to play against the Cincinnati Bengals in the Eagles' third preseason game on August 10. Davis was projected to be the Eagles' starting right offensive tackle for the 1991 season. Davis suffered a sprained ankle while running laps around JFK Stadium and tripping over a goal post support on August 19. Due to the injury, he was taken out of the preseason game against the Indianapolis Colts on August 23 at halftime by Kotite. The Eagles and Davis finalized a five-year contract worth $4.6 million on September 6 following the first week of the season. Davis changed his jersey number from 77 to 78 after signing the contract. He had his best game of the season in week four against the Pittsburgh Steelers on September 22, as Kotite called more run plays to the right side towards the end of the game. Davis had a key block on a Jim McMahon quarterback sneak touchdown and McMahon gave Davis the ball immediately after to spike in celebration. The Eagles were given a five-yard penalty for the spike, however. In a week five game against the Washington Redskins on September 30, Davis gave up two sacks against defensive end Charles Mann, who received Pro Bowl honors after the season. Davis gave up a total of ten sacks in the first five games of the season.

Against the Buccaneers in week six on October 6, Davis was benched in the third quarter after he was called for three holding penalties and was replaced by Bruce Collie. Collie suffered a knee injury in his second play, and Davis re-entered the game. The day after the game, Kotite said about Davis: "He certainly played poorly yesterday without question. If you've got eyes you could see that." Ron Heller moved from left tackle to replace Davis at right tackle the next week against the New Orleans Saints. Daryle Smith, after being waived in training camp, was re-signed to play left tackle. Due to a groin injury suffered by Smith, Davis regained his starting job at right tackle with Heller moving back to left tackle against the San Francisco 49ers in week nine. Davis gave up two sacks against Charles Haley in the game and was called for holding once, but Kotite said Davis improved from his previous start. Davis started in every game at right tackle after his benching in 1991. Kotite praised Davis after the Giants game on November 4, saying that he "played very well." Davis was named to the Pro Football Writers of America NFL All-Rookie Team after the season.

==== 1992 season ====
Davis improved as a blocker in his second season with the Eagles. At the start of training camp in 1992, Davis vowed to refuse all requests for interviews by the media in an attempt to focus on getting better. Against the New Orleans Saints, Davis helped the Eagles lead the NFC in rushing for the week with 186 yards. Against the Washington Redskins in week seven on October 18, 1992, he suffered a knee sprain after quarterback Randall Cunningham ran into him. He was listed as doubtful before the following game against the Phoenix Cardinals, and did not play in the game. He was listed as doubtful again before the game against the Dallas Cowboys in week nine. Otho Davis, the team's head athletic trainer, said Davis was not working hard enough to rehabilitate his knee. Antone Davis was upgraded to questionable two days before the game, and started against the Cowboys on November 1. In the wild card playoff game against the Saints on January 3, 1993, Davis gave up a sack against Rickey Jackson, which caused a Cunningham fumble. Davis started in all 15 games he played during the regular season, and started in both of the team's playoff games. Pro Football Weekly rated Davis as the 26th-best offensive tackle in the league for the season.

==== 1993 season ====
Davis played through a shoulder injury early in the 1993 season. Defensive end Reggie White, who signed with the Green Bay Packers following the 1992 season after spending eight seasons with the Eagles and earned seven Pro Bowl selections, said that he believed he destroyed Davis' confidence as a rookie and second-year player, as Davis had to go up against White in practice every week. White said "there are some guys who get very discouraged because they can't block you. I think that was the situation at times with Antone." Davis, however, disputed White's statements as the Eagles played against the Packers in the second week of the season. Dave Goldberg, a writer for the Associated Press, named Davis to his "all-unsung" team after his performance against White. Davis started in every game for the Eagles at right tackle in 1993.

==== 1994 season ====
With the Eagles pick of offensive tackle Bernard Williams in the first round of the 1994 NFL draft, Davis moved inside to play left offensive guard in the 1994 season. Davis was ejected from a week thirteen game against the Atlanta Falcons on November 27, along with Lester Holmes, for fighting on the field with defensive tackle Pierce Holt of the Falcons. Davis was benched in favor of rookie Joe Panos before a week sixteen game against the New York Giants after committing seven penalties in his previous fourteen starts. Davis played in the final two games of the season. Head coach Rich Kotite was fired after the season.

==== 1995 season ====
Under new coach Ray Rhodes, Davis was moved back to right tackle in 1995. Rhodes said that after looking at the 1994 season's game footage, he determined Davis' "best position for [the Eagles] is at tackle." The Eagles signed former Packer Joe Sims on April 14, 1995, to compete with Davis for the starting right tackle job. The team reportedly tried to trade Davis in order to move up in the first round of the 1995 NFL draft, but no team would take their offer. Due to left tackle Bernard Williams' six-game suspension from the NFL, Sims moved over to the left, with Davis staying at right tackle before the preseason. However, due to his performance in training camp, Davis was benched before a preseason game against the Pittsburgh Steelers on August 24, in favor of Lester Holmes. Holmes suffered a knee injury during the second week of the season and was replaced by Davis. Davis replaced him in week three against the San Diego Chargers and started in the remaining thirteen games of the season and two playoff games thereafter. In a week fourteen game against the Seattle Seahawks, Moe Elewonibi played in place of Davis for two series in a move, as Rhodes explained, aimed at giving reserve players experience in case of injury. Davis gave up three sacks against Alonzo Spellman of the Chicago Bears in the final regular season game. He gave up seven total sacks in his fourteen regular season starts. Davis suffered a mild concussion in a wild card playoff game against the Detroit Lions after he was kicked in the head. He gave up two sacks against Tony Tolbert in a divisional round playoff loss to the Cowboys. His rookie contract expired following the season and he made $1 million for the season. He was considered a draft bust after being taken in the first round in 1991.

=== Later career ===
Davis was not re-signed by the Eagles following the 1995 season and became an unrestricted free agent. He worked out for the Atlanta Falcons on April 25, 1996. After initially disagreeing on the terms of the contract, Davis signed with the Falcons on May 13 and agreed to a two-year contract worth $1.9 million. The contract contained a $200,000 signing bonus and a $300,000 workout bonus to go along with a $1.4 million base salary, and up to $300,000 in incentives based on playing time. He began the 1996 season as a backup behind David Richards at right tackle. Davis started in place of the injured Richards for a week five game against the San Francisco 49ers on September 29. Richards came back from his injury in week six, but he and Davis split playing time in weeks seven and eight against the Houston Oilers and Dallas Cowboys, respectively. Richards was waived on October 23 by the Falcons, who decided to go with Davis at right tackle for the remainder of the year. Davis suffered a right ankle sprain in a week sixteen game against the St. Louis Rams on December 15.

The Falcons proposed a restructured contract to Davis, reportedly worth $3 million for three years in March 1997. After starting the first three games at right tackle in 1997, Davis was benched in favor of backup Matt Willig on September 18. Davis did not play in the remaining thirteen games of the season, and was waived by the team on February 11, 1998.

The Green Bay Packers signed Davis on January 22, 1999, reuniting him with new Packers coach Ray Rhodes. His tenure with the Packers was short-lived, however, as Green Bay released him in June.

Davis finished his seven-year NFL career with 87 starts in 97 games and recovered a fumble in the 1997 season.

== After football ==
Davis owned a restaurant called "Gridiron Grill" in Clermont, Florida, for a short time after his career ended. He worked as a manager of a Chili's restaurant prior to going on The Biggest Loser in 2011, but was fired after his boss requested that he go back to work immediately after returning home for an interim period.

Davis was a contestant on the twelfth season of The Biggest Loser, which premiered on September 20, 2011, and ended on December 13, 2011. He struggled with his weight after his football career ended, and he weighed 476 pounds (216 kg) before he decided to go on the reality television show. Additionally, he saw several former college and professional teammates die due to their weights, including Reggie White and Harry Galbreath, and wanted to change his lifestyle. He began the show weighing 447 pounds (203 kg), and he weighed 245 pounds (111 kg) in the season finale, for a total loss of 202 pounds (92 kg), or 45.19 percent, and finished as the runner-up behind John Rhode.

The University of Tennessee announced on August 28, 2012, that Davis had been hired as the Vol for Life (VFL) Coordinator for the school's football program. Five years later, on October 31, 2017, he submitted his two-week notice to resign from that position. During his tenure with Tennessee, he resided in Murfreesboro, Tennessee.

Davis moved to Delaware to work for JPMorgan Chase with his wife after leaving the University of Tennessee in 2017. Davis' oldest son Dakota played college football for the Chattanooga Mocs as an offensive lineman before his career ended prematurely due to concussions. His younger son Braden was a highly recruited quarterback for Middletown High School (Middletown, Delaware) and Lake Minneola High School (Minneola, Florida), and committed to play college football for South Carolina in April 2021. He entered the NCAA transfer portal following the 2022 season, and joined Syracuse in May 2023.
