= Ken Rose =

Ken Rose may refer to:

- Ken Rose (American football) (born 1962), American football linebacker
- Ken Rose (figure skater) (born 1986), Canadian figure skater
- Kenneth Rose (1924–2014), British journalist and royal biographer
