= Brad Goebel =

American football player (born 1967)

No. 8
- Position: Quarterback

Personal information
- Born: October 13, 1967 (age 59); Cuero, Texas, U.S.
- Listed height: 6 ft 3 in (1.91 m)
- Listed weight: 214 lb (97 kg)

Career information
- High school: Cuero
- College: Baylor
- NFL draft: 1991: undrafted

Career history
- Philadelphia Eagles (1991); San Antonio Riders (1992); Cleveland Browns (1992), (1993–1994); Jacksonville Jaguars (1995); Washington Redskins (1996)*
- * Offseason or practice squad member only

Career NFL statistics
- Passing attempts: 59
- Passing completions: 32
- Completion percentage: 54.2%
- TD–INT: 0–6
- Passing yards: 299
- Passer rating: 28.8
- Stats at Pro Football Reference

Bradley Arlen Goebel (born October 13, 1967) is an American former professional football player who was a quarterback for five seasons in the National Football League (NFL) for the Philadelphia Eagles, Cleveland Browns and Jacksonville Jaguars.

Goebel appeared in 6 NFL games, starting 2 games in 1991 as the QB for the Philadelphia Eagles and 1 appearance for the Cleveland Browns in 1992. Brad played 3 years for the Browns from 1992 to 1994. He signed with the Jacksonville Jaguars in 1995.

Goebel played college football for the Baylor Bears from 1986 to 1990. He was a freshman consensus All-SWC QB in 1987 and held numerous passing records at Baylor University. He was inducted into the Baylor Hall of Fame in 2021.

== Statistics ==
Goebel's statistics are as follows:

Year	Team	Games	Games Started	Record	Passing							Rushing			
Year	Team	Games	Games Started	Record	Comp	Att	Yards	Pct.	TD	Int	QB rating	Att	Yards	Avg	TD
1986	Baylor	Redshirt													
1987	Baylor	11	11	6–5	158	305	2,178	51.8	9	12	113.7	79	−175	−2.2	1
1988	Baylor	11	11	6–5	117	237	1,524	49.4	9	16	102.4	50	−58	−1.2	1
1989	Baylor	11	11	5–6	95	175	1,255	54.3	7	11	115.2	22	−84	−3.8	0
1990	Baylor	11	4	2–2	5	13	69	38.5	0	1	67.7	6	11	1.8	0
Totals		44	37	19–17	375	730	5,026	51.4	25	40	109.5	157	-306	-1.9	2
