= William Thomas (linebacker) =

American football player (born 1968)

No. 51, 59
- Position: Linebacker

Personal information
- Born: August 13, 1968 (age 58); Amarillo, Texas, U.S.
- Listed height: 6 ft 2 in (1.88 m)
- Listed weight: 223 lb (101 kg)

Career information
- High school: Palo Duro (Amarillo)
- College: Texas A&M
- NFL draft: 1991: 4th round, 104th overall pick

Career history
- Philadelphia Eagles (1991–1999); Oakland Raiders (2000–2001)

Awards and highlights
- Second-team All-Pro (1995); 2× Pro Bowl (1995, 1996); 2x First-team All-SWC (1990), (1989)

Career NFL statistics
- Tackles: 886
- Sacks: 37
- Forced fumbles: 10
- Fumble recoveries: 12
- Interceptions: 27
- Defensive touchdowns: 4
- Stats at Pro Football Reference

William Harrison Thomas (born August 13, 1968) is an American former professional football player who was a linebacker in the National Football League (NFL) for the Philadelphia Eagles (1991–1999) and Oakland Raiders (2000–2001) franchises.

Thomas attended Palo Duro High School and later played college football at Texas A&M University for the Aggies. After college, Philadelphia selected Thomas in the fourth round, 104th overall in the 1991 NFL draft. He played for the Eagles in nine NFL seasons. His most notable seasons were in 1995 and 1996 which he was selected as a member of the NFC's Pro Bowl team. After his Eagles contract expired, Thomas signed with the Oakland Raiders which were coached by former Eagles assistant, Jon Gruden.

Thomas ended his career with 37 sacks and 27 interceptions and is a member of the 20/20 Club. He was also known as an exceptional pass-coverage linebacker during his career.

Thomas was a member of the coaching staff at La Salle University as a volunteer assistant during the 2007 season.

Thomas formerly resided in the southern New Jersey area with his wife and three sons. As of 2021, he is now divorced and resides in Pennsylvania.

== NFL career statistics ==
Legend
	Led the league
**Bold**	Career high

=== Regular season ===
Year	Team	Games		Tackles				Interceptions				Fumbles			
Year	Team	GP	GS	Comb	Solo	Ast	Sck	Int	Yds	TD	Lng	FF	FR	Yds	TD
1991	PHI	16	7	40	40	0	2.0	0	0	0	0	0	1	0	0
1992	PHI	16	15	94	94	0	1.5	2	4	0	4	0	2	2	0
1993	PHI	16	16	**107**	**107**	0	**6.5**	2	39	0	21	**4**	**3**	0	0
1994	PHI	16	16	87	60	**27**	6.0	1	7	0	7	0	0	0	0
1995	PHI	16	16	74	62	12	2.0	**7**	**104**	**1**	37	1	1	0	0
1996	PHI	16	16	71	54	17	5.5	3	47	0	37	0	1	23	**1**
1997	PHI	14	14	80	59	21	5.0	2	11	0	11	0	1	**37**	**1**
1998	PHI	16	16	86	62	24	2.0	1	21	0	21	1	0	0	0
1999	PHI	14	13	81	59	22	2.5	0	0	0	0	2	1	9	0
2000	OAK	16	16	78	69	9	1.0	6	68	**1**	**46**	2	0	0	0
2001	OAK	16	15	88	64	24	3.0	3	46	0	33	0	2	11	0
		172	160	886	730	156	37.0	27	347	2	46	10	12	82	2

=== Playoffs ===
Year	Team	Games		Tackles				Interceptions				Fumbles			
Year	Team	GP	GS	Comb	Solo	Ast	Sck	Int	Yds	TD	Lng	FF	FR	Yds	TD
1992	PHI	2	2	0	0	0	0.0	0	0	0	0	0	**1**	**24**	0
1995	PHI	2	2	7	6	1	0.0	**1**	**30**	**1**	**30**	0	0	0	0
1996	PHI	1	1	3	3	0	**1.0**	0	0	0	0	0	0	0	0
2000	OAK	2	2	9	6	3	**1.0**	0	0	0	0	0	0	0	0
2001	OAK	2	2	**19**	**14**	**5**	0.0	0	0	0	0	0	0	0	0
		9	9	38	29	9	2.0	1	30	1	30	0	1	24	0

== Sources ==
- Kaufman, Ira (December 14, 2005). "All A Matter Of Tuck". The Tampa Tribune.
- Lance Lahnert (November 23, 2000). "Thomas has made a 'commitment to excellence'". Amarillo Globe-News.
- "Draft History (Philadelphia Eagles)". NFL.com. Archived from the original on November 23, 2005.
