= Bruce Collie =

American football player (born 1962)

No. 69
- Positions: Guard, tackle

Personal information
- Born: June 27, 1962 (age 64); Nuremberg, Germany
- Listed height: 6 ft 6 in (1.98 m)
- Listed weight: 275 lb (125 kg)

Career information
- High school: Robert E. Lee (San Antonio, Texas, U.S.)
- College: Texas-Arlington
- NFL draft: 1985: 5th round, 140th overall pick

Career history
- San Francisco 49ers (1985–1989); Philadelphia Eagles (1990–1991); New York Jets (1992)*
- * Offseason or practice squad member only

Awards and highlights
- 2× Super Bowl champion (XXIII, XXIV)

Career NFL statistics
- Games played: 91
- Games started: 40
- Stats at Pro Football Reference
- College Football Hall of Fame

Bruce Stokes Collie (born June 27, 1962) is a former professional American football offensive lineman in the National Football League (NFL) for the San Francisco 49ers and the Philadelphia Eagles. He played college football at the University of Texas at Arlington and was drafted in the fifth round of the 1985 NFL draft.

A born-again Christian, Collie now resides in Wimberley, Texas with his wife, Holly, and 13 children Devyn (1993–2023), Jordyn (b. 1994), Jensen (b. 1995), Denton (b. 1996), Branson (b. 1997), Cameron (b. 1998), Bergyn (b. 2000), Calyn (b. 2001), Hadyn (b. 2002), Hansen (b. 2004), Daltyn (b. 2005), Jadyn (b. 2007) and Dennison (b. 2009), where he brews beer & sells pizza.

He operated Wimberley Brewing Company & Brewster's Pizza, a micro-brewery & pizza business in a building he designed and built himself located at "The Junction" on Ranch Road-12 @ FM-32 in Wimberley, Texas, until it closed in 2020.

In 2010, he coached the San Marcos Homeschool Panther's varsity football team. Collie is an advocate of the Tim Tebow bill that would allow homeschoolers in Texas to play sports offered by public schools.

On January 14, 2026, Collie was inducted into the College Football Hall of Fame.
