= Mike Reid (defensive back) =

American football player (born 1970)

No. 42
- Position: Defensive back

Personal information
- Born: November 24, 1970 (age 55); Spartanburg, South Carolina, U.S.
- Listed height: 6 ft 1 in (1.85 m)
- Listed weight: 218 lb (99 kg)

Career information
- High school: Gettys D. Broome (Spartanburg)
- College: North Carolina State (1989–1992)
- NFL draft: 1993: 3rd round, 77th overall pick

Career history
- Philadelphia Eagles (1993–1994)

Awards and highlights
- Second-team All-American (1992); First-team All-ACC (1992); Second-team All-ACC (1991)

Career NFL statistics
- Tackles: 3
- Stats at Pro Football Reference

Michael Fitzgibbon Reid (born November 24, 1970) is an American former professional football player who was a defensive back for two seasons with the Philadelphia Eagles of the National Football League (NFL). He was selected by the Eagles in the third round of the 1993 NFL draft after playing college football at North Carolina State University.

== Early life and college ==
Michael Fitzgibbon Reid was born on November 24, 1970, in Spartanburg, South Carolina. He attended Gettys D. Broome High School in Spartanburg.

Reid was a four-year letterman for the NC State Wolfpack of North Carolina State University from 1989 to 1992. He recorded two interceptions for 31 yards in 1991 while also returning one punt for nine yards, earning Associated Press (AP) second-team All-Atlantic Coast Conference (ACC) honors. In 1992, he totaled three interceptions for 88 yards and one punt return for 28 yards, garnering AP first-team All-ACC recognition. Reid was also named a second-team All-American by both the AP and The Sporting News in 1992.

== Professional career ==
Reid was selected by the Philadelphia Eagles in the third round, with the 77th overall pick, of the 1993 NFL draft. He officially signed with the team on June 7. He played in nine games for the Eagles during his rookie year in 1993 and posted three tackles. Reid appeared in three games during the 1994 season. He was released on July 21, 1995.
