= Bernard Williams (gridiron football) =

American football player (born 1972)

No. 74, 69, 73
- Position: Offensive tackle

Personal information
- Born: July 18, 1972 (age 54); Memphis, Tennessee, U.S.
- Listed height: 6 ft 8 in (2.03 m)
- Listed weight: 317 lb (144 kg)

Career information
- High school: Hamilton (Memphis)
- College: Georgia
- NFL draft: 1994: 1st round, 14th overall pick

Career history
- Philadelphia Eagles (1994–1995); BC Lions (2000); Memphis Maniax (2001); Detroit Fury (2001–2002); Toronto Argonauts (2003–2006)

Awards and highlights
- Grey Cup champion (2004); 2× CFL East All-Star (2005, 2006); First-team All-American (1993); First-team All-SEC (1993)

Career NFL statistics
- Games played: 16
- Games started: 16
- Stats at Pro Football Reference

Career AFL statistics
- Tackles: 14
- Passes defended: 13
- Interceptions: 1
- Stats at ArenaFan.com

Bennie Bernard Williams (born July 18, 1972) is an American former professional football player who was an offensive tackle in the National Football League (NFL) and Canadian Football League (CFL). He was selected by the Philadelphia Eagles in the first round (14th overall) of the 1994 NFL draft and played for one season with the team. He was suspended by the NFL for violating the league's substance abuse policy after his rookie season and never applied for reinstatement. He later played for the BC Lions and Toronto Argonauts of the CFL, Memphis Maniax of the XFL, and Detroit Fury of the Arena Football League (AFL).

== Professional career ==
Pre-draft measurables
Height	Weight	Arm length	Hand span	40-yard dash	10-yard split	20-yard split	20-yard shuttle	Vertical jump	Broad jump	Bench press
6 ft 8 1/4 in (2.04 m)	317 lb (144 kg)	36 1/8 in (0.92 m)	10 3/8 in (0.26 m)	5.38 s	1.89 s	3.14 s	4.68 s	26.0 in (0.66 m)	8 ft 7 in (2.62 m)	17 reps
All values from NFL Combine

Williams was selected by the Philadelphia Eagles in the first round with the 14th overall selection in the 1994 NFL draft. He started all 16 games for the team in 1994 at left tackle. He earned all-rookie selections after the season.

Following his rookie season, Williams was suspended for first six games of the 1995 NFL season by the league on July 25, 1995, for testing positive for marijuana. He returned to practice with the team on October 9. He was not activated to the roster, however, and was suspended by the NFL for the rest of the season on October 23 for a second violation of the league's substance abuse policy. He earned two weekly paychecks from the Eagles between the two suspensions.

Williams was eligible to apply for reinstatement from suspension beginning on May 24, 1996, but he never did. As a result, Williams remained on the Eagles' reserve/suspended list until he was finally waived on November 16, 2023, which was 29 years after he last played for them and 17 years after his last professional game.

Williams also played five games for the BC Lions of the Canadian Football League in 2000 after receiving permission from the Eagles. He was the starting left tackle for the Memphis Maniax of the XFL in 2001. He played for the Detroit Fury of the Arena Football League from 2001 to 2002. Williams played with the Toronto Argonauts of the CFL from 2003 to 2006. He was named an East Division All-Star for the 2005 and 2006 seasons.

== Personal life ==
Williams began smoking marijuana in high school after his father died. His mother died of breast cancer in 1996. His aunt, Alice Marie Johnson, was sentenced to life in prison on drug charges in 1996 before having her sentence commuted in 2018. His cousin, Ray Brown, played in the NFL for 20 seasons.

After retiring from football, Williams became a high school football coach and mentored his nephew, future NFL safety Eric Berry. Williams and his nephew opened a vintage car store and a juice bar.

In 2015, after undergoing heart surgery, Williams stopped smoking marijuana. As of 2023, Williams was working toward a psychology degree, while working as a driver for Amazon, volunteer firefighting, and restoring old cars.
