= Tommy Jeter =

American football player (born 1969)

No. 98, 97
- Position: Defensive tackle

Personal information
- Born: September 20, 1969 (age 57); Nacogdoches, Texas, U.S.
- Listed height: 6 ft 5 in (1.96 m)
- Listed weight: 285 lb (129 kg)

Career information
- High school: Deer Park (TX)
- College: Texas
- NFL draft: 1992: 3rd round, 75th overall pick

Career history
- Philadelphia Eagles (1992–1995); Carolina Panthers (1996)

Awards and highlights
- Second-team All-SWC (1991)

Career NFL statistics
- Tackles: 17
- Sacks: 1
- Forced fumble: 1
- Stats at Pro Football Reference

Thomas Melvin Jeter (born September 20, 1969) is an American former professional football player who was a defensive tackle for five seasons in the National Football League (NFL). He played for the Philadelphia Eagles from 1992 to 1995 and for the Carolina Panthers in 1996. He was selected by the Eagles in the third round of the 1992 NFL draft. He played college football for the Texas Longhorns.

== Professional career ==
=== Philadelphia Eagles ===
Jeter was selected by the Philadelphia Eagles in the third round (75th overall) of the 1992 NFL draft. He signed a three-year contract with the team on July 7, 1992. Per Pro Football Reference, he accumulated sixteen combined tackles, at least three solo tackles, one sack, and one forced fumble over 36 games played (15 games in 1992, 7 games in 1993, and 14 games in 1994).

=== Carolina Panthers ===
Jeter played in one game for the Carolina Panthers in 1996, recording one tackle.
