= Peter Giunta (American football) =

American football coach (born 1956)

New Orleans Saints
- Title: Senior defensive assistant

Personal information
- Born: August 11, 1956 (age 70); Salem, Massachusetts, U.S.

Career information
- Positions: Cornerback & running back
- College: Northeastern

Career history
- Swampscott HS (MA) (1978–1980) Head coach; Penn State (1981–1983) Assistant coach; Brown (1984–1985) Tight ends coach & wide receivers coach; Brown (1986) Quarterbacks coach; Brown (1987) Offensive coordinator & quarterbacks coach; Lehigh (1988–1990) Tight ends coach & wide receivers coach; Philadelphia Eagles (1991–1994) Defensive backs coach; New York Jets (1995–1996) Defensive backs coach; St. Louis Rams (1997) Defensive backs coach; St. Louis Rams (1998–1999) Co-defensive coordinator; St. Louis Rams (2000) Defensive coordinator; Kansas City Chiefs (2001–2005) Defensive backs coach; New York Giants (2006–2014) Defensive backs coach; New Orleans Saints (2016–present) Senior defensive assistant

Awards and highlights
- 3× Super Bowl champion (XXXIV, XLII, XLVI); National champion (1982)
- Coaching profile at Pro Football Reference

Peter Giunta (/ˈdʒuːntə/ JOON-tə; born August 11, 1956) is an American football coach who is the senior defensive assistant for the New Orleans Saints of the National Football League (NFL). He served as defensive backs coach to defensive coordinator Perry Fewell and head coach Tom Coughlin for the New York Giants from 2006 to 2014. Giunta has also served as defensive coordinator for the St. Louis Rams from 1998 to 2000, succeeding the retiring Bud Carson. Giunta has coached at the high school, college, and professional level, and also as both offensive and defensive assistant throughout his career. He played cornerback and running back under Robert Lyons at Northeastern University from 1974 to 1977.
