= Izel Jenkins =

American football player (born 1964)

No. 46, 28, 24
- Position: Cornerback

Personal information
- Born: May 27, 1964 (age 62); Wilson, North Carolina, U.S.
- Listed height: 5 ft 10 in (1.78 m)
- Listed weight: 191 lb (87 kg)

Career information
- High school: Ralph L. Fike (Wilson)
- College: NC State
- NFL draft: 1988: 11th round, 288th overall pick

Career history
- Philadelphia Eagles (1988–1992); Minnesota Vikings (1993); New York Giants (1993)

Career NFL statistics
- Interceptions: 4
- Sacks: 1
- Safeties: 1
- Stats at Pro Football Reference

Izel Jenkins Jr. (born May 27, 1964) is an American former professional football player who was a defensive back in the National Football League (NFL) for the Philadelphia Eagles, Minnesota Vikings, and New York Giants during the late 1980s and early 1990s. He played college football for the NC State Wolfpack and was selected by the Eagles in the 11th round of the 1988 NFL draft.
