= Victor Bailey (American football) =

American football player (born 1970)

No. 82, 88, 85
- Position: Wide receiver

Personal information
- Born: July 3, 1970 (age 56); Fort Worth, Texas, U.S.
- Listed height: 6 ft 2 in (1.88 m)
- Listed weight: 196 lb (89 kg)

Career information
- High school: Dunbar (TX)
- College: Missouri
- NFL draft: 1993: 2nd round, 50th overall pick

Career history
- Philadelphia Eagles (1993–1994); Kansas City Chiefs (1995–1996)

Awards and highlights
- First-team All-Big Eight (1992)

Career NFL statistics
- Receptions: 62
- Receiving yards: 868
- Receiving touchdowns: 2
- Stats at Pro Football Reference

Victor Lamont Bailey (born July 3, 1970) is an American former professional football player who played wide receiver for three seasons for the Philadelphia Eagles and Kansas City Chiefs. He was drafted in the second round of the 1993 NFL Draft by the Eagles. As a rookie in 1993, he recorded 41 catches for 545 yards and 3 touchdowns. He followed that year up with 20 catches for 311 yards and one touchdown in 1994.

He is currently living with his wife Tonja Buford-Bailey and his two kids- Victoria and Victor Bailey Jr.
