= Leonard Renfro =

American football player (born 1970)

No. 94
- Position: Defensive tackle

Personal information
- Born: June 29, 1970 (age 56); Detroit, Michigan, U.S.
- Listed height: 6 ft 2 in (1.88 m)
- Listed weight: 291 lb (132 kg)

Career information
- High school: St. Mary's Prep (Orchard Lake Village, Michigan)
- College: Colorado
- NFL draft: 1993: 1st round, 24th overall pick

Career history
- Philadelphia Eagles (1993–1994); Washington Redskins (1996)*; Dallas Cowboys (1997)*
- * Offseason or practice squad member only

Career NFL statistics
- Tackles: 19
- Stats at Pro Football Reference

Leonard Renfro (born June 29, 1970) is an American former professional football player who was a defensive tackle for two seasons with the Philadelphia Eagles of the National Football League (NFL). He was selected by the Eagles in the first round of the 1993 NFL draft.
