= Jim Vechiarella =

American football coach (born 1937)

Personal information
- Born: February 20, 1937 (age 89); Youngstown, Ohio

Career information
- High school: Rayen (OH)
- College: Youngstown State

Career history
- Charlotte Hornets (1975) Defensive line coach; Tulane (1978–1980) Assistant coach; Los Angeles Rams (1981–1982) Special teams coach; Kansas City Chiefs (1983–1985) Special teams coordinator & linebackers coach; New York Jets (1986–1989) Linebackers coach; Cleveland Browns (1990) Defensive coordinator; Philadelphia Eagles (1991–1994) Linebackers coach; New York Jets (1995–1996) Defensive coordinator & linebackers coach; San Diego Chargers (1997–2001) Defensive coordinator
- Coaching profile at Pro Football Reference

Jim Vechiarella (born February 20, 1937) is an American football coach who last served as interim defensive coordinator for the San Diego Chargers in 2001. He was defensive coordinator for the New York Jets from 1995 to 1996 under head coach Rich Kotite.
