= Jeff Sydner =

American football player (born 1969)

No. 85
- Position: Wide receiver

Personal information
- Born: November 11, 1969 (age 56); Columbus, Ohio, U.S.
- Listed height: 5 ft 6 in (1.68 m)
- Listed weight: 177 lb (80 kg)

Career information
- High school: East (Columbus)
- College: Hawaii
- NFL draft: 1992: 6th round, 160th overall pick

Career history
- Philadelphia Eagles (1992–1994); New York Jets (1995)

Career NFL statistics
- Receptions: 3
- Receiving yards: 52
- Return yards: 1,609
- Stats at Pro Football Reference

Jeffrey Lynn Sydner (born November 11, 1969) is an American former professional football player who was a wide receiver in the National Football League (NFL) for the Philadelphia Eagles and New York Jets. He was selected by the Eagles in the sixth round of the 1992 NFL draft. He played college football for the Hawaii Warriors.
