= Mike Flores =

American football player (born 1966)

No. 95, 96, 92
- Position: Defensive end

Personal information
- Born: December 1, 1966 (age 59); Youngstown, Ohio, U.S.
- Listed height: 6 ft 3 in (1.91 m)
- Listed weight: 256 lb (116 kg)

Career information
- High school: East (Youngstown)
- College: Louisville (1986–1990)
- NFL draft: 1991: 11th round, 298th overall pick

Career history
- Philadelphia Eagles (1991–1994); Cincinnati Bengals (1995)*; Washington Redskins (1995); San Francisco 49ers (1995); Washington Redskins (1995)
- * Offseason or practice squad member only

Career NFL statistics
- Tackles: 74
- Sacks: 7
- Fumble recoveries: 2
- Stats at Pro Football Reference

Michael Andre Flores (born December 1, 1966) is an American former professional football player who was a defensive end in the National Football League (NFL) for the Philadelphia Eagles, the San Francisco 49ers, and the Washington Redskins. He played college football for the Louisville Cardinals. He was selected by the Eagles in the 11th round of the 1991 NFL draft with the 298th overall pick. 1990 First Team All-South Independent
