= Mark McMillian =

American football player (born 1970)

No. 29, 21
- Position: Cornerback

Personal information
- Born: April 29, 1970 (age 56); Los Angeles, California, U.S.
- Listed height: 5 ft 7 in (1.70 m)
- Listed weight: 154 lb (70 kg)

Career information
- High school: John F. Kennedy (Los Angeles)
- College: Alabama
- NFL draft: 1992: 10th round, 272nd overall pick

Career history
- Philadelphia Eagles (1992–1995); New Orleans Saints (1996); Kansas City Chiefs (1997–1998); San Francisco 49ers (1999); Washington Redskins (1999)

Career NFL statistics
- Tackles: 409
- Interceptions: 23
- Interception yards: 404
- Touchdowns: 4
- Stats at Pro Football Reference

Mark D. McMillian (born April 29, 1970), nicknamed "Mighty Mouse", is an American former professional football player who was a cornerback for eight seasons in the National Football League (NFL). He played college football for the Alabama Crimson Tide and was selected by the Philadelphia Eagles with the 272nd overall pick in the 10th round of the 1992 NFL draft, with whom he spent four seasons. He also spent two seasons with the Kansas City Chiefs. In his career, McMillian had brief stints with the New Orleans Saints, San Francisco 49ers, and Washington Redskins.

McMillian attended Kennedy High School in Granada Hills, California, where he did not start playing organized football until his senior year. He played college football at the University of Alabama after transferring from Glendale Junior College. In 1991, while in college at Alabama, he returned an interception for a 98-yard touchdown versus Tennessee-Chattanooga, a school record.

In 1997, while playing for the Chiefs, he led the NFL in interception return yards and was tied for second-most interceptions with 8.

One of the smallest players in the NFL, McMillian stood 5 ft 7 in (1.70 m) and was listed at various points in his career as 162 lb (73 kg), 154 lb (70 kg), and 148 lb (67 kg). In October 1995, he won an Emmy Award for his regular segment of teammate Randall Cunningham's weekly pregame show. The segment, titled Little Big Men, showcased highlights from players standing 5 ft 9 in (1.75 m) or shorter.

== Post-football ==
McMillian appeared as a contestant on Season 2 of American culinary reality competition television series Next Level Chef, mentored by Gordon Ramsay. He finished in 15th place out of 18 contestants.
