= James Joseph (American football) =

American football player (born 1967)

No. 32, 36
- Position: Running back

Personal information
- Born: October 28, 1967 (age 59); Phenix City, Alabama, U.S.
- Listed height: 6 ft 2 in (1.88 m)
- Listed weight: 225 lb (102 kg)

Career information
- High school: Central (Phenix City)
- College: Auburn
- NFL draft: 1991: 7th round, 187th overall pick

Career history
- Philadelphia Eagles (1991–1994); Cincinnati Bengals (1995)

Career NFL statistics
- Rushing yards: 823
- Rushing average: 3.3
- Rushing touchdowns: 4
- Receptions: 102
- Receiving yards: 817
- Receiving touchdowns: 3
- Stats at Pro Football Reference

James Joseph Jr. (born October 28, 1967) is an American former professional football player who was a running back in the National Football League (NFL). He played college football for the Auburn Tigers.

Joseph attended Auburn University, and was selected by the Philadelphia Eagles in the seventh round of the 1991 NFL draft. In his rookie year Joseph was the Eagles' leading rusher with 440 yards. After four seasons with the Eagles, in 1995, Joseph joined the Cincinnati Bengals, where he played one season.

== Personal life ==
Joseph later taught Physical Education in August 2021 at LEAD Academy-Montgomery AL. He is still teaching today as of August 2022.
