= Maurice Johnson (American football) =

American football player (born 1967)

No. 87
- Position: Tight end

Personal information
- Born: January 9, 1967 (age 59); Washington, D.C., U.S.
- Listed height: 6 ft 2 in (1.88 m)
- Listed weight: 242 lb (110 kg)

Career information
- High school: Roosevelt (Washington, D.C.)
- College: Temple (1986–1989)
- NFL draft: 1990: undrafted

Career history
- Philadelphia Eagles (1990–1994); Frankfurt Galaxy (1996)

Awards and highlights
- Second-team All-East (1989)

Career NFL statistics
- Receptions: 39
- Receiving yards: 371
- Receiving touchdowns: 4
- Stats at Pro Football Reference

Maurice Edward Johnson (born January 9, 1967) is an American former professional football player who was a tight end for four seasons with the Philadelphia Eagles of the National Football League (NFL). He played college football for the Temple Owls. He was also a member of the Frankfurt Galaxy of the World League of American Football (WLAF).

== Early life ==
Maurice Edward Johnson was born on January 9, 1967, in Washington, D.C.. He attended Roosevelt High School in Washington, D.C.

== College career ==
Johnson lettered for the Temple Owls from 1986 to 1989. He caught eight passes for 42 yards as a freshman in 1986. He totaled 14 receptions for 151 yards and one touchdown in 1987. He recorded 18 catches for 242 yards in 1988. Johnson caught 31 passes for 290 yards his senior year in 1989, earning Associated Press second-team All-East honors.

== Professional career ==
After going undrafted in the 1990 NFL draft, Johnson signed with the Philadelphia Eagles on May 24. He was released by the Eagles on September 3 and signed to the team's practice squad on October 1, 1990. He became a free agent after the 1990 season and re-signed with the Eagles on April 8, 1991. Johnson was released again on August 26 but later re-signed on September 26, 1991. He then played in 12 games, starting six, for the Eagles, catching six passes for 70 yards and two touchdowns. The next year, he was placed on injured reserve on September 1, 1992, and later activated on October 14, 1992. Johnson appeared in 11 games, starting three, during the 1992 season, recording two receptions for 16 yards on six targets. He also appeared in two playoff games that season but did not record any statistics. He played in all 16 games, starting two, in 1993, catching 10 passes for 81 yards on 16 targets. He became a free agent after the 1993 season and re-signed with the Eagles on March 29, 1994. Johnson played in all 16 games for the second straight season, starting a career-high ten, in 1994, totaling 21 receptions for 204 yards and two touchdowns on 36 targets. He was released by the Eagles on August 27, 1995.

Johnson was a member of the Frankfurt Galaxy of the World League of American Football in 1996 but did not appear in any games.
