= Mike Schad =

American gridiron football player and banker (born 1963)

No. 76, 79, 55
- Position: Guard

Personal information
- Born: October 4, 1963 (age 63); Trenton, Ontario, Canada
- Listed height: 6 ft 5 in (1.96 m)
- Listed weight: 290 lb (132 kg)

Career information
- High school: Moira (Belleville, Ontario)
- University: Queen's
- NFL draft: 1986: 1st round, 23rd overall pick
- CFL draft: 1986: 1st round, 4th overall pick

Career history
- Los Angeles Rams (1986–1988); Philadelphia Eagles (1989–1993); Cleveland Browns (1994); Ottawa Rough Riders (1995)

Awards and highlights
- J. P. Metras Trophy (1985)

Career NFL statistics
- Games played: 62
- Games started: 55
- Fumble recoveries: 2
- Stats at Pro Football Reference

Michael Schad (born October 4, 1963) is a Canadian former professional football player who was an offensive lineman in the National Football League (NFL). After his football career, he became a mortgage banker with CMG Financial located in Mt. Laurel, New Jersey.

He was selected by the Los Angeles Rams in the first round with the 23rd pick of the 1986 NFL draft. He attended Moira Secondary school in Belleville, Ontario. He played his university football at Queen's University in Canada. He is the only player in U Sports football history to be selected in the first round of an NFL draft. In 1986, he won the J. P. Metras Trophy which is presented annually to the top down lineman in university football in Canada.

He played a total of 62 games with the Rams and the Philadelphia Eagles, before returning to Canada in 1995 to play one year with the CFL's Ottawa Rough Riders.
