= Rich Kotite =

American football player and coach (born 1942)

No. 86, 88, 87
- Position: Tight end

Personal information
- Born: October 13, 1942 (age 84); Brooklyn, New York, U.S.
- Listed height: 6 ft 3 in (1.91 m)
- Listed weight: 233 lb (106 kg)

Career information
- High school: Poly Prep (Brooklyn)
- College: Miami (FL); Wagner
- NFL draft: 1965: 18th round, 247th overall pick
- AFL draft: 1965: Red Shirt 9th round, 68th overall pick

Career history

Playing
- New York Giants (1967); Pittsburgh Steelers (1968); New York Giants (1969–1972)

Coaching
- New Orleans Saints (1977) Tight ends coach; Cleveland Browns (1978–1982) Wide receivers coach; New York Jets (1983–1989); Wide receivers coach (1983–1984); Offensive coordinator (1985–1989); Philadelphia Eagles (1990–1994); Offensive coordinator (1990); Head coach (1991–1994); New York Jets (1995–1996) Head coach

Operations
- New York Jets (1995–1996) General manager

Awards and highlights
- Second-team Little All-American (1964)

Career NFL statistics
- Receptions: 17
- Receiving yards: 213
- Receiving touchdowns: 5
- Stats at Pro Football Reference

Head coaching record
- Regular season: 40–56 (.417)
- Postseason: 1–1 (.500)
- Career: 41–57 (.418)
- Coaching profile at Pro Football Reference
- Executive profile at Pro Football Reference

Richard Edward Kotite (born October 13, 1942) is an American former professional football player and coach in the National Football League (NFL). He played as a tight end. In the 1990s, he had head coaching stints with the Philadelphia Eagles and the New York Jets.

== Playing career ==
Kotite was born in Brooklyn, New York. He graduated from Poly Prep Country Day School in 1961. He played the tight end position at Wagner College on Staten Island before being drafted in the 18th round of the 1965 NFL draft by the Minnesota Vikings. After playing for his hometown New York Giants in 1967, he went to the Pittsburgh Steelers the next year before returning to the Giants for a four-year stint starting in 1968.

== Coaching career ==
After his professional football career was over, Kotite spent much of the next two decades as an assistant coach, including a lengthy stint as offensive coordinator of the New York Jets.

=== Philadelphia Eagles ===
Kotite was hired in 1990 to replace Ted Plumb as offensive coordinator of the Philadelphia Eagles. He was promoted to head coach after the firing of his predecessor, Buddy Ryan.

Kotite led the Eagles to winning seasons in 1991 and 1992, respectively, despite the loss of Eagles quarterback Randall Cunningham for the season with a torn anterior cruciate ligament on opening day of 1991. In 1991, the defense under Bud Carson, architect and defensive coordinator of Pittsburgh's famed Steel Curtain of the 1970s, led the league by accomplishing the rare trifecta of being the number one run defense, the number one pass defense, and number one in total defense. After missing the playoffs by one game in 1991, Eagles were a wild card in the 1992 playoffs, finishing 8–0 at home. However, in the spring of 1993, the talent that had been drafted by Ryan over five years began leaving the Eagles during free agency. Kotite had poor drafts and the level of talent dropped precipitously as his draft picks began replacing the talent that had been drafted by Ryan. In the 1993 season, the Eagles went 8–8. One of the many things for which Kotite was criticized in Philadelphia was for saying at the conclusion of the season, "Hey, eight and eight is great." An incident that seemed to antagonize Eagles fans occurred the following season, in a Week 7 game against the Cowboys that the Eagles lost 24–13. At the post-game press conference, when asked, he stated that the reason he went for a (failed) two-point conversion attempt rather than kick the point after following the second touchdown late in the fourth quarter, was because the "rain made the ink run and blurred the chart, so I couldn't see what was written on it to know what to do."

The Eagles began the 1994 season 7–2, including a 40–8 thrashing of that season's eventual Super Bowl XXIX champion San Francisco 49ers, and Kotite achieving his seventh win against the Arizona Cardinals, then coached by his former boss, Buddy Ryan. Looking forward, a playoff berth seemed assured and Kotite's future seemed bright. In the spring of that year, the Eagles were purchased by Jeffrey Lurie from former owner Norman Braman. Whenever asked by the media if he was going to retain Rich Kotite as head coach of the Eagles going forward after the season, Lurie usually replied to the effect that it was too early in the process to be able to say anything, that any measured evaluation would have to take place at the conclusion of the season, and that he wished to keep his options open. After beating the Cardinals for that seventh win, Kotite sarcastically used Lurie's words and told the media that he would be doing his own evaluations at the end of the season and keeping his own options open. The Eagles lost all seven of their remaining games, finishing the season 7–9, behind the Cowboys (12–4), Giants (9–7), and Cardinals (8–8), then still in the NFC East; Kotite was fired by the Eagles one day after the season ended.

=== New York Jets ===
After the Eagles let Kotite go, he returned to his hometown as head coach of the New York Jets, who had just fired Pete Carroll after one losing season (6–10). Owner Leon Hess named Kotite general manager as well. But under his leadership, the Jets suffered two of the three worst seasons in franchise history. Kotite won only four games in two seasons, falling to 3–13 in 1995 and 1–15 in 1996 for the worst record in the league both years. Poorly handled drafts contributed to the disappointing seasons, most notably Kotite's first round selection of tight end Kyle Brady over the heavily favored Warren Sapp in 1995, even as a contingent of Jets fans were heard at the draft chanting "We want Sapp!". Two days before the last game of the 1996 season, Kotite announced he was stepping down as head coach. He has not coached in the NFL again in any capacity. Counting his final seven matches in Philadelphia, Kotite lost 35 of his final 39 games that he coached.

== Post NFL ==
After his coaching days were over, Kotite was involved in two TV promotional commercials, for the USA Network during the US Open Tennis championships, and for AmeriTrade during the Super Bowl XXXIV pregame show casting him as father of a son who surprises him by telling him he wants to be a Broadway dancer. He continued his media career for the NFL as a regular contributor to NFL Films programming on the NFL Network in particular, including the NFL Top 10 show.

== Head coaching record ==
Team	Year	Regular season					Postseason			
Team	Year	Won	Lost	Ties	Win %	Finish	Won	Lost	Win %	Result
PHI	1991	10	6	0	.625	3rd in NFC East	—	—	—	—
PHI	1992	11	5	0	.688	2nd in NFC East	1	1	.500	Lost to Dallas Cowboys in NFC Divisional Game
PHI	1993	8	8	0	.500	3rd in NFC East	—	—	—	—
PHI	1994	7	9	0	.438	4th in NFC East	—	—	—	—
PHI Total		36	28	0	.563		1	1	.500	
NYJ	1995	3	13	0	.188	5th in AFC East	—	—	—	—
NYJ	1996	1	15	0	.063	5th in AFC East	—	—	—	—
NYJ Total		4	28	0	.125		0	0	.000	
Total		40	56	0	.417		1	1	.500	

== See also ==
- Staten Island Sports Hall of Fame
