= Andy Harmon =

American football player (born 1969)

No. 91
- Positions: Defensive tackle, defensive end

Personal information
- Born: April 6, 1969 (age 57); Dayton, Ohio, U.S.
- Listed height: 6 ft 4 in (1.93 m)
- Listed weight: 272 lb (123 kg)

Career information
- High school: Centerville (Centerville, Ohio)
- College: Kent State
- NFL draft: 1991: 6th round, 156th overall pick

Career history
- Philadelphia Eagles (1991–1997)

Awards and highlights
- Second-team All-Pro (1995)

Career NFL statistics
- Total tackles: 296
- Sacks: 39.5
- Forced fumbles: 7
- Fumble recoveries: 6
- Interceptions: 1
- Stats at Pro Football Reference

Andrew Phillip Harmon (born April 6, 1969) is an American former professional football player who was a defensive tackle in the National Football League (NFL). He was selected by the Philadelphia Eagles in the sixth round of the 1991 NFL draft. He played college football for the Kent State Golden Flashes.

Harmon has now settled down in Centerville, Ohio.

He is second behind Fletcher Cox on the Philadelphia Eagles all-time sack list among defensive tackles with 39.5.
