= Ben Smith (cornerback) =

American football player (born 1967)

No. 26, 33
- Position: Defensive back

Personal information
- Born: May 14, 1967 (age 59); Warner Robins, Georgia, U.S.
- Listed height: 5 ft 11 in (1.80 m)
- Listed weight: 183 lb (83 kg)

Career information
- High school: Warner Robins (GA)
- College: Georgia
- NFL draft: 1990: 1st round, 22nd overall pick

Career history
- Philadelphia Eagles (1990–1993); Denver Broncos (1994); Arizona Cardinals (1995–1996)

Awards and highlights
- PFWA All-Rookie Team (1990); Second-team All-American (1989); First-team All-SEC (1989)

Career NFL statistics
- Total tackles: 241
- Sacks: 1
- Interceptions: 6
- Stats at Pro Football Reference

Benjamin Joseph Smith (born May 14, 1967) is an American former professional football player who was a defensive back in the National Football League (NFL) for the Philadelphia Eagles, the Denver Broncos, and the Arizona Cardinals. He played college football at the University of Georgia (after transferring from Northeastern Oklahoma A&M University his freshman year) and was selected in the first round of the 1990 NFL draft.
