= Dale Haupt =

American football coach

Personal information
- Born: April 12, 1929; Manitowoc, Wisconsin, U.S.
- Died: April 3, 2018 (aged 88); Laurinburg, North Carolina, U.S.

Career information
- College: Wyoming

Career history
- Tennessee (1960–1963) (asst.); Iowa State (1964–1965) (asst.); Richmond (1966–1971) (asst.); North Carolina State (1972–1977) (asst.); Duke (1978) (asst.); Chicago Bears (1978–1985) (asst.); Philadelphia Eagles (1986–1995) (asst.); Coast Guard (1997) (asst.)

Awards and highlights
- Super Bowl champion (XX)

Dale Rudolph Siegfried Haupt (April 12, 1929 – April 3, 2018) was an American football coach who served as the defensive line coach for the Chicago Bears of the National Football League (NFL), winning a Super Bowl with them in 1985. In 1986, Haupt joined Bears defensive coordinator Buddy Ryan in leaving the team to join the Philadelphia Eagles, and was replaced by John Levra. He served the Eagles until his retirement in 1995. He joined the staff at the Coast Guard Academy in 1997, reuniting him with former Bears coach Jim LaRue. Haupt had worked with Buddy Ryan with the NFLPA Game.

Haupt died on April 3, 2018, at the age of 88.
