= Lester Holmes =

American football player (born 1969)

No. 73, 71
- Position: Guard

Personal information
- Born: September 27, 1969 (age 57); Tylertown, Mississippi, U.S.
- Listed height: 6 ft 4 in (1.93 m)
- Listed weight: 315 lb (143 kg)

Career information
- High school: Tylertown (MS)
- College: Jackson State
- NFL draft: 1993: 1st round, 19th overall pick

Career history
- Philadelphia Eagles (1993–1996); Oakland Raiders (1997); Arizona Cardinals (1998–2000)

Career NFL statistics
- Games played: 102
- Games started: 94
- Fumble recoveries: 5
- Stats at Pro Football Reference

Lester Holmes (born September 27, 1969) is an American former professional football player who was an offensive lineman in the National Football League (NFL). He played college football at Jackson State University and was selected in the first round of the 1993 NFL draft with the 19th overall pick.
