= Rob Selby =

American football player (born 1967)

No. 75, 74
- Position: Guard

Personal information
- Born: October 11, 1967 (age 59); Birmingham, Alabama, U.S.
- Listed height: 6 ft 4 in (1.93 m)
- Listed weight: 290 lb (132 kg)

Career information
- College: Auburn
- NFL draft: 1991: 3rd round, 75th overall pick

Career history
- Philadelphia Eagles (1991–1994); Atlanta Falcons (1995)*; Arizona Cardinals (1995–1997); Kansas City Chiefs (1998)*
- * Offseason or practice squad member only

Awards and highlights
- First-team All-SEC (1990)

Career NFL statistics
- Games played: 62
- Games started: 18
- Stats at Pro Football Reference

Rob Selby (born October 11, 1967) is an American former professional football player who played offensive lineman in the National Football League (NFL) for seven seasons. He was drafted by the Philadelphia Eagles in the third round of the 1991 NFL draft. He played for Philadelphia for four seasons from 1991 to 1994. He also played for the Arizona Cardinals from 1995 to 1997. He played college football for Auburn.
