= Ken Rose (gridiron football) =

American football player and coach (born 1961)

No. 92, 52, 55
- Position: Linebacker

Personal information
- Born: June 9, 1961 (age 65); Sacramento, California, U.S.
- Listed height: 6 ft 1 in (1.85 m)
- Listed weight: 215 lb (98 kg)

Career information
- High school: Christian Brothers (Sacramento)
- College: UNLV
- NFL draft: 1984: undrafted

Career history

Playing
- Saskatchewan Roughriders (1984); Los Angeles Raiders (1985)*; New York Jets (1987–1989); Cleveland Browns (1990); Philadelphia Eagles (1990–1994)
- * Offseason or practice squad member only

Coaching
- New York Jets (1995–1996) (special teams)

Career NFL statistics
- Sacks: 6.5
- Fumble recoveries: 2
- Interceptions: 1
- Touch down: 1
- Stats at Pro Football Reference

Kenneth Frank Rose (born June 9, 1961) is an American former professional football player who was a linebacker in the National Football League (NFL) for the New York Jets, Cleveland Browns, and Philadelphia Eagles. Rose graduated from Christian Brothers High School (Sacramento, California). He played college football for the UNLV Rebels and played alongside Randall Cunningham, among others.

== Professional football ==
Rose caught on with the Saskatchewan Roughriders of the Canadian Football League (CFL). Following two seasons there, he played a season with the Tampa Bay Bandits of the United States Football League (USFL). Rose was interested in playing for the NFL and attended several training camps in the mid-1980s. Ken Rose joined the New York Jets in 1987 during the strike by the players union and was one of the few players who stayed on the roster. Rose remained with the Jets through 1989. In 1990, he split playing time with the Cleveland Browns and the Philadelphia Eagles, released by the Browns (along with head coach Bud Carson) after the seventh game and signing with the Eagles for their final 8 regular-season games. Rose remained with the Eagles through the 1994 season. Ken Rose later became a special teams coach for the New York Jets until 1996.
