= John Hudson (American football) =

American football player (born 1968)

No. 76, 66, 65
- Positions: Guard, center, long snapper

Personal information
- Born: January 29, 1968 (age 58); Memphis, Tennessee, U.S.
- Listed height: 6 ft 2 in (1.88 m)
- Listed weight: 270 lb (122 kg)

Career information
- High school: Henry County (Paris, Tennessee)
- College: Auburn
- NFL draft: 1990: 11th round, 294th overall pick

Career history
- Philadelphia Eagles (1990–1995); New York Jets (1996–1999); Baltimore Ravens (2000)

Awards and highlights
- Super Bowl champion (XXXV); Second-team All-SEC (1989)

Career NFL statistics
- Games played: 139
- Games started: 0
- Stats at Pro Football Reference

John Lewis Hudson (born January 29, 1968) is an American former professional football player who was a center for 10 seasons in the National Football League (NFL) with the New York Jets, Philadelphia Eagles, and Baltimore Ravens. He played college football for the Auburn Tigers.

== History ==
Hudson played college football at Auburn University and was selected by the Philadelphia Eagles in the eleventh round of the 1990 NFL draft. He was a member of the 2000 World Champion Baltimore Ravens. After retiring from the professional sport, Hudson became a high-school football coach at Henry County High School in Paris, Tennessee; he also serves as a deacon and Sunday school teacher at the town's First Baptist Church. He was inducted into the Tennessee Football Hall of Fame in 2011.
