= Bud Carson =

American football player and coach (1930–2005)

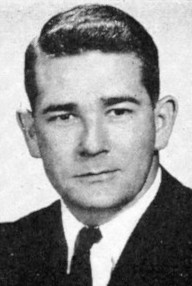
- Carson, c. 1964

Biographical details
- Born: April 28, 1930; Brackenridge, Pennsylvania, U.S.
- Died: December 7, 2005 (aged 75); Sarasota, Florida, U.S.

Playing career
- 1949–1951: North Carolina
- Position: Defensive back

Coaching career (HC unless noted)
- 1958–1964: North Carolina (DB)
- 1965: South Carolina (DC)
- 1966: Georgia Tech (DC)
- 1967–1971: Georgia Tech
- 1972: Pittsburgh Steelers (DB)
- 1973–1977: Pittsburgh Steelers (DC)
- 1978–1981: Los Angeles Rams (DC)
- 1982: Baltimore Colts (DC)
- 1983: Kansas City Chiefs (DC/DB)
- 1984: Kansas (Advisor)
- 1985–1988: New York Jets (DC)
- 1989–1990: Cleveland Browns
- 1991–1994: Philadelphia Eagles (DC)
- 1997: St. Louis Rams (DC)

Head coaching record
- Overall: 11–13–1 (NFL); 27–27 (college)
- Tournaments: 1–1 (NFL); 1–1 (college)

Accomplishments and honors

Championships
- As assistant coach: 2× Super Bowl champion (IX, X)

Leon H. "Bud" Carson (April 28, 1930 – December 7, 2005) was an American football coach. He served as the head football coach at the Georgia Institute of Technology from 1967 to 1971, compiling a record of 27–27. Carson then coached in the National Football League (NFL), mostly as a defensive coordinator. He was a member of two Super Bowl-winning teams with the Pittsburgh Steelers and one losing team with the Los Angeles Rams in the 1970s. Carson served as the head coach of the Cleveland Browns from 1989 until he was fired midway through the 1990 season. He is credited with developing the Steel Curtain. He created the Cover 2 defense, and coached two of the NFL's all time great defenses, the 1976 Steelers and 1991 Philadelphia Eagles.

== Early life ==
Carson was born on April 28, 1930, in Freeport or Brackenridge, Pennsylvania, in Allegheny County, northeast of Pittsburgh, to Leon and Margaret (Bricker) Carson. His father was a steelworker who had quit school in the eighth grade. Carson was a three-sport star at Freeport High School, in Freeport.

Carson was All-Western Pennsylvania in football and basketball, Western Pennsylvania Interscholastic Athletic League (WPIL) Player of the Year in football, and participated in a state-wide football All-Star Game. He won two top academic awards at Freeport, was an honor society member, elected class president and student body vice president, and was class valedictorian. He classmates believed he would one day be a football coach, and his coaches saw a strong inherent determination in him.

== College career and military service ==
In college, Carson was a standout defensive back/safety and a quarterback for the University of North Carolina Tar Heels from 1949 to 1951. He once ran a punt back 74 yards for a touchdown. He next entered the Marines for two years.

== Coaching career ==
After his discharge from the Marines, he went into coaching. He came home to coach at Freeport, and later got his first head coaching job at Scottdale High School in Southwestern Pennsylvania, near Freeport, which he began in 1955. Two years later, in 1957, he coached the freshman team at North Carolina, while assisting with the varsity, and was the backs coach from 1958 to 1964. In 1965, he headed the defense for the University of South Carolina Gamecocks. South Carolina won the Atlantic Coast Conference title in 1965. When Carson, the Gamecocks defensive coordinator, left in January 1966, he was replaced by Lou Holtz on the coaching staff.

=== Georgia Tech ===
Carson at Georgia Tech, c. 1966

In 1966, he became defensive coordinator at Georgia Tech under head coach Bobby Dodd, who was in his last year. Carson took over as head coach in 1967, coaching the team through 1971. Under Carson, the Yellow Jackets endured three straight 4–6 seasons before going 9–3 and winning the Sun Bowl over Texas Tech 17–9 in 1970, and setting a school record for total offense. In 1971, Tech finished 6–6 after a Peach Bowl loss, and Carson became the object of severe criticism by some, who wanted him fired. His more strict style as head coach contrasted with the popular Dodd's head coaching. His dismissal as the Yellow Jackets' head coach by James E. Boyd was reported in the Atlanta Constitution under the headline "Bitter Bud Carson Is Ousted at Tech".

In 1970, the GT Band began playing the Budweiser tune after the end of the 3rd quarter. In tribute to the then head coach the words were actually sung as, "When you say Bud Carson, you've said it all!"

It was at Georgia Tech that Carson began developing the Cover 2 defense.

=== Pittsburgh Steelers ===
Pittsburgh Steelers future Pro Football Hall of Fame and member of the NFL 100th Anniversary Team head coach Chuck Noll hired Carson as defensive backs coach in 1972. He was elevated to defensive coordinator in 1973. Under Carson, the "Steel Curtain" developed as one of the best defenses in National Football League history. In Pittsburgh's Super Bowl seasons of 1974 and 1975, this unit, led by team captain Andy Russell, Jack Lambert, Mel Blount, Jack Ham and Mean Joe Greene, gave up fewer points than any other American Football Conference team. In 1976, the "Steel Curtain" allowed fewer than 10 points per game, including a nine game winning streak where the defense only allowed 28 points in total. The 1976 Steelers' defense is one of the top defenses in NFL history, one of two top-10 defenses Carson headed (along with the 1991 Philadelphia Eagles defense).

Carson's defense combined an exceptionally strong front four with a complicated zone coverage defense known as the Cover 2. Russell said Carson had the defense doing things he had never heard of, "playing five or six different defenses before the ball was even snapped." Team owner Dan Rooney said Carson wanted fast and athletic players who could get upfield and rush the passer, rather than bigger players who just jammed up offenses.

=== Los Angeles Rams, Kansas City Chiefs, Baltimore Colts and New York Jets ===
Carson left the Steelers after six years, and went on to serve as a defensive coordinator for four different NFL teams in 10 of the next 11 seasons.

After the 1977 season, Carson was hired as defensive coordinator for the Los Angeles Rams, and from 1978 to 1981, he helped the team to three playoff appearances, two NFC West titles, and an NFC Championship in 1979. That season, Carson and the Rams reached Super Bowl XIV (losing against his former team, the Steelers). Leaving the Rams for the Baltimore Colts, Carson lasted one season as Baltimore finished with an NFL-worst record of 0-8-1 in the strike-shortened 1982 NFL season. He then spent one season as defensive coordinator and defensive backs coach for the Kansas City Chiefs in 1983. Carson did not coach in the NFL in 1984, but served as an advisor at the University of Kansas.

In 1985, he was hired to take over the defense of the New York Jets, replacing Joe Gardi as defensive coordinator, a position that he held from 1985 to 1988. His first season saw the defense go from 21st to 8th, but his final season saw them stumble to 23rd. Carson "infused spirit" into the Jets defense, and was able to use average players and backups to step up when the Jets went through a series of injuries every season he was there. In 1986, Carson helped the Jets to a nine-game winning streak and 10–1 record at the time, with only three defensive players who had started every game, none of whom was a defensive lineman or part of the defensive backfield.

=== Cleveland Browns ===
Carson finally landed a head-coaching job with the Cleveland Browns in 1989, replacing Marty Schottenheimer, who was fired after a wild card playoff loss to the Houston Oilers in 1988, and had a dispute with owner Art Modell about being offensive coordinator as well as head coach. Carson was hired on January 27, 1989, by general manager Ernie Accorsi, over the other fellow finalist Fritz Shurmur. At 57, only one active NFL head coach at the time had been hired at a greater age. Jets coach Joe Walton conceded the loss of Carson was a setback for the Jets. Browns owner Modell conditioned Carson's hiring on Carson not being involved in drafting players, and retaining certain specific coaches instead of selecting his own staff.

The Browns split their first six games before a four-game winning streak had them at 7–3. They then suffered through a skid that saw them lose three of their next four games (with a tie to Schottenheimer and his new team in the Kansas City Chiefs in between). It took a victory on the final game of the year against Houston (after nearly letting a 17-point lead slip away) to clinch the Central Division (Houston and Pittsburgh had nine wins as well, but Cleveland had one less loss due to the tie). In the Divisional Round, they faced the Buffalo Bills at home. They narrowly beat the Bills 34–30 where Clay Matthews Jr. intercepted a last-second pass in the endzone to seal the victory.

They advanced to the AFC Championship Game in Denver, who they had played twice before in the past couple of seasons. Once again, the Broncos (led by John Elway) prevailed. The Broncos led by ten at halftime and never trailed in a 37–21 victory where they had 497 total yards. In addition to 1989 being the last division title in team history as of 2022, it is the last time the Browns have reached the AFC Championship Game.

In 1990, the Browns won their opening day game against the Steelers 13–3. They proceeded to go on a skid, losing the next three games by scores of 3, 10, and 34. A narrow victory over Denver on October 8 ended up being Carson's last win as a coach. The team lost the next four games before the bye week, which had seen them lose 42–0 to Buffalo to go to 2–7. On November 5, one day after that game, Modell fired Carson, stating that the firing was done to "stop the hemorrhaging". Modell later said firing Carson was a mistake.

Browns' offensive coordinator Jim Shofner became head coach and the Browns finished the season with a 3–13 record. Save for a 13–10 win over the Atlanta Falcons, the Browns were outscored 217–87, including being shut out 35–0 by the Pittsburgh Steelers and losing 58–14 to the rival Houston Oilers. In the AFC Central Division rival games, the Browns won on opening day against the Steelers, 13–3. They lost their remaining five AFC Central games however, being outscored by a total of 183–64. The 1990 team gave up 462 total points, the worst for any team in the decade.

=== Philadelphia Eagles and St. Louis Rams ===
In 1991, Carson became the defensive coordinator for the Philadelphia Eagles, under head coach Rich Kotite. The 1991 Eagles' defense accomplished the rare feat of being ranked first against the pass, first in rushing defense, and first in overall defense. It was also first in sacks and tied for first in takeaways.

He was defensive coordinator and defensive backs coach for the Eagles from 1991 to 1994, taking over the defense after Buddy Ryan's firing as head coach. The 1991 Eagles defense was led by future hall of famer and NFL 100th Anniversary Team member Reggie White, Jerome Brown (who died in a car accident in June 1992), Clyde Simmons, Eric Allen, and Sports Illustrated NFL Player of the Year Seth Joyner, among others. Carson's adaptive creativity was exemplified in a December 1991 game against the explosive Houston Oilers Run and Shoot offense, where he used a 4-2-5 defensive scheme to stifle Houston in a 13–6 victory, known as the "House of Pain Game". The 1991 Eagles defense is considered one of the top defensive teams in NFL history.

In 1997, the Rams—by then in St. Louis—hired 60-year-old Dick Vermeil as their head coach. Vermeil hired 65-year-old Carson out of retirement as the Rams defensive coordinator. Carson retired again one year later, in March 1998, due to health concerns. In 2000, he came back to the Rams as a consultant.

In 2017, the Professional Football Writers of America presented its Dr. Z. Award posthumously to Carson. This award, named after Sports Illustrated sports writer Paul Zimmerman, is given to top assistant coaches.

== Family and death ==
Carson, a former smoker, died in 2005 of emphysema. He was married to Linda Carson, an anchorwoman at WDAF in Kansas City, and Sarasota television station WWSB. His daughter Cathi Carson worked as the sports reporter at two Jacksonville stations, WJAX-TV and WFOX-TV, and was formerly a reporter at WWSB before later becoming a lawyer. He also had a son, Cliff, and another daughter, Dana, as well as a stepson, Donald. His brother, Gib Carson, died in 2011, and was the owner of Gib Carson Associates, which specializes in manufactured gifts.

== Head coaching record ==
=== College ===
| Year | Team | Overall | Conference | Standing | Bowl/playoffs | Coaches^{#} | AP^{°} |
|---|---|---|---|---|---|---|---|
Georgia Tech Yellow Jackets (NCAA University Division independent) (1967–1971)
| 1967 | Georgia Tech | 4–6 | | | | | |
| 1968 | Georgia Tech | 4–6 | | | | | |
| 1969 | Georgia Tech | 4–6 | | | | | |
| 1970 | Georgia Tech | 9–3 | | | W Sun | 17 | 13 |
| 1971 | Georgia Tech | 6–6 | | | L Peach | | |
| Georgia Tech: | | 27–27 | | | | | |
| Total: | | 27–27 | | | | | |
^{#}Rankings from final Coaches Poll.; ^{°}Rankings from final AP Poll.

=== NFL ===
| Team | Year | Regular Season | | | | | Postseason | | | |
| Team | Year | Won | Lost | Ties | Win % | Finish | Won | Lost | Win % | Result |
|---|---|---|---|---|---|---|---|---|---|---|
| CLE | 1989 | 9 | 6 | 1 | .594 | 1st in AFC Central | 1 | 1 | .500 | Lost to Denver Broncos in AFC Championship Game. |
| CLE | 1990 | 2 | 7 | 0 | .222 | 4th in AFC Central | – | – | – | – |
| CLE Total | | 11 | 13 | 1 | .460 | | 1 | 1 | .500 | |
| Total | | 11 | 13 | 1 | .460 | | 1 | 1 | .500 | |
