= 1990 Phoenix Cardinals season =

NFL team season

- Owner: Bill Bidwill
- General manager: Larry Wilson
- Head coach: Joe Bugel
- Home stadium: Sun Devil Stadium

Results
- Record: 5–11
- Division place: 5th NFC East
- Playoffs: Did not qualify
- Pro Bowlers: RB Johnny Johnson

The 1990 Phoenix Cardinals season was the franchise's 92nd season, 71st season in the National Football League and the 3rd in Arizona. Despite rookie running back Johnny Johnson creating a good enough impression to make the Pro Bowl, the Cardinals did not improve upon their 5–11 record from 1989.

== Offseason ==
=== NFL draft ===
1990 Phoenix Cardinals draft
| Round | Pick | Player | Position | College | Notes |
| 2 | 31 | Anthony Thompson | Running back | Indiana | |
| 3 | 58 | Ricky Proehl | Wide receiver | Wake Forest | |
| 4 | 85 | Travis Davis | Nose tackle | Michigan State | |
| 5 | 115 | Larry Centers * | Fullback | Stephen F. Austin | |
| 6 | 142 | Tyrone Shavers | Wide receiver | Lamar | |
| 7 | 169 | Johnny Johnson * | Running back | San Jose State | |
| 8 | 199 | Mickey Washington | Cornerback | Texas A&M | |
| 9 | 225 | David Bavaro | Linebacker | Syracuse | |
| 10 | 252 | Dave Elle | Tight end | South Dakota | |
| 11 | 282 | Dempsey Norman | Wide receiver | St. Francis (IL) | |
| 12 | 308 | Donnie Riley | Running back | Central Michigan | |
| 12 | 330 | Ken McMichel | Defensive back | Oklahoma | |
Made roster * Made at least one Pro Bowl during career

== Personnel ==
=== Staff ===
1990 Phoenix Cardinals staff
| Front office: President – Bill Bidwill; Vice-president and general manager – Larry Wilson; Director of pro personnel – Erik Widmark; Director of player personnel – George Boone; Head coaches: Head coach – Joe Bugel; Offensive coaches: Offensive coordinator – Jerry Rhome; Running backs – Bobby Hammond; Receivers – Ted Plumb; Offensive line – Tom Lovat | Defensive coaches: Defensive coordinator – Joe Pascale; Defensive line – Ted Cottrell; Defensive secondary – Jim Johnson; Defensive assistant/quality control – Mike Murphy; Special teams coaches: Special teams – Pete Rodriguez; Strength and conditioning: Strength and conditioning – Bob Rogucki |

=== Roster ===
1990 Phoenix Cardinals roster
| Quarterbacks (QB): 3 Timm Rosenbach; 19 Tom Tupa; Running backs (RB): 37 Larry Centers; 32 Terrence Flagler; 39 Johnny Johnson; 36 Vai Sikahema; 34 Anthony Thompson; 24 Ron Wolfley FB; Wide receivers (WR): 26 Amod Field; 81 Roy Green; 80 John Jackson; 86 Ernie Jones; 87 Ricky Proehl; 84 J. T. Smith; Tight ends (TE): 85 Tim Jorden; 89 Walter Reeves | Offensive linemen (OL): 74 Mike Graybill T; 57 Kani Kauahi; 70 Derek Kennard G; 51 Bill Lewis C; 63 Tootie Robbins T; 67 Luis Sharpe T; 61 Lance Smith G; 69 Vernice Smith G/T; 68 Joe Wolf T; Defensive linemen (DL): 98 Carl Hairston DE; 92 Dexter Manley DE; 78 Freddie Joe Nunn DE; 72 Rod Saddler DE; 66 Jim Wahler NT | Linebackers (LB): 59 David Bavaro ILB; 55 Anthony Bell OLB; 54 David Braxton OLB; 56 Ken Harvey OLB; 58 Eric Hill ILB; 53 Garth Jax ILB; 52 Chris Washington ILB; Defensive backs (DB): 25 Stanley Blair CB; 29 Lorenzo Lynch CB; 46 Tim McDonald SS; 47 Cedric Mack CB; 27 Jay Taylor CB; 23 Marcus Turner DB; 43 Lonnie Young FS; 38 Mike Zordich SS; Special teams (ST): 16 Rich Camarillo P; 17 Al Del Greco K | Practice squad: 33 Pat Chaffey RB; 7 Craig Kupp QB; 76 Craig Patterson DE; 95 Dana Wells NT; 96 Willie Williams TE; Reserve: 79 Bob Clasby DE (IR); 21 Tracey Eaton S (IR); 20 Darren Flutie WR (IR); 83 Don Holmes WR (IR); 30 David Little TE (IR); 90 Eldonta Osborne LB (IR); 50 Jeroy Robinson LB (IR); 60 Jeff Walker T (IR); 47 active, 8 inactive, 5 practice squad Rookies in italics |

== Regular season ==
=== Schedule ===
| Week | Date | Opponent | Result | Record | Venue | Attendance | Recap |
|---|---|---|---|---|---|---|---|
| 1 | September 9 | at **Washington Redskins** | **L** 0–31 | 0–1 | RFK Stadium | 52,649 | Recap |
| 2 | September 16 | at **Philadelphia Eagles** | **W** 23–21 | 1–1 | Veterans Stadium | 64,396 | Recap |
| 3 | September 23 | at New Orleans Saints | **L** 7–28 | 1–2 | Louisiana Superdome | 61,110 | Recap |
| 4 | September 30 | **Washington Redskins** | **L** 10–38 | 1–3 | Sun Devil Stadium | 49,303 | Recap |
| 5 | Bye | | | | | | |
| 6 | October 14 | **Dallas Cowboys** | **W** 20–3 | 2–3 | Sun Devil Stadium | 45,235 | Recap |
| 7 | October 21 | at **New York Giants** | **L** 19–20 | 2–4 | Giants Stadium | 76,518 | Recap |
| 8 | October 28 | Chicago Bears | **L** 21–31 | 2–5 | Sun Devil Stadium | 71,233 | Recap |
| 9 | November 4 | at Miami Dolphins | **L** 3–23 | 2–6 | Joe Robbie Stadium | 54,294 | Recap |
| 10 | November 11 | at Buffalo Bills | **L** 14–45 | 2–7 | Rich Stadium | 74,904 | Recap |
| 11 | November 18 | Green Bay Packers | **L** 21–24 | 2–8 | Sun Devil Stadium | 46,878 | Recap |
| 12 | November 25 | New England Patriots | **W** 34–14 | 3–8 | Sun Devil Stadium | 30,110 | Recap |
| 13 | December 2 | Indianapolis Colts | **W** 20–17 | 4–8 | Sun Devil Stadium | 31,885 | Recap |
| 14 | December 9 | at Atlanta Falcons | **W** 24–13 | 5–8 | Atlanta–Fulton County Stadium | 36,222 | Recap |
| 15 | December 16 | at **Dallas Cowboys** | **L** 10–41 | 5–9 | Texas Stadium | 60,190 | Recap |
| 16 | December 23 | **New York Giants** | **L** 21–24 | 5–10 | Sun Devil Stadium | 41,212 | Recap |
| 17 | December 29 | **Philadelphia Eagles** | **L** 21–23 | 5–11 | Sun Devil Stadium | 31,796 | Recap |
Note: Intra-division opponents are in **bold** text.

=== Game summaries ===
==== Week 1: at Washington Redskins ====
Week 1: Phoenix Cardinals at Washington Redskins – Game summary

| Quarter | 1 | 2 | 3 | 4 | Total |
|---|---|---|---|---|---|
| Cardinals | 0 | 0 | 0 | 0 | **0** |
| **Redskins** | 7 | 7 | 14 | 3 | **31** |

at Robert F. Kennedy Memorial Stadium, Washington, District of Columbia

- Date: September 9
- Game time: 1:00 p.m. EST/11:00 a.m. MST
- Game weather: 68 °F (20 °C)
- Game attendance: 52,649
- Box Score

Game information

**First quarter**

- WAS – Ricky Sanders 37-yard pass from Mark Rypien (Chip Lohmiller kick). Redskins 7–0.

**Second quarter**

- WAS – Earnest Byner 4-yard pass from Mark Rypien (Chip Lohmiller kick). Redskins 14–0.

**Third quarter**

- WAS – Gary Clark 43-yard pass from Mark Rypien (Chip Lohmiller kick). Redskins 21–0.

**Fourth quarter**

- WAS – Alvin Walton 57-yard interception return (Chip Lohmiller kick). Redskins 28–0.
- WAS – Chip Lohmiller 29-yard field goal. Redskins 31–0.

**Top passers**

- PHO – Timm Rosenbach – 20/39, 228 yards, 4 INT
- WAS – Mark Rypien – 17/31, 240 yards, 3 TD

**Top rushers**

- PHO – Johnny Johnson – 14 rushes, 54 yards
- WAS – Earnest Byner – 17 rushes, 63 yards

**Top receivers**

- PHO – Johnny Johnson – 6 receptions, 99 yards
- WAS – Ricky Sanders – 6 receptions, 90 yards, TD

==== Week 2: at Philadelphia Eagles ====
Week 2: Phoenix Cardinals at Philadelphia Eagles – Game summary

| Quarter | 1 | 2 | 3 | 4 | Total |
|---|---|---|---|---|---|
| **Cardinals** | 0 | 7 | 7 | 9 | **23** |
| Eagles | 14 | 0 | 7 | 0 | **21** |

at Veterans Stadium, Philadelphia, Pennsylvania

- Date: September 16
- Game time: 1:00 p.m. PST/2:00 p.m. MST
- Game weather: 65 °F (18 °C)
- Game attendance: 64,396
- Box Score

Game information

**First quarter**

- PHI – Marvin Hargrove 34-yard pass from Randall Cunningham (Roger Ruzek kick). Eagles 7–0.
- PHI – Randall Cunningham 1-yard run (Roger Ruzek kick). Eagles 14–0.

**Second quarter**

- PHO – Johnny Johnson 22-yard run (Al Del Greco kick). Eagles 14–7.

**Third quarter**

- PHO – Anthony Thompson 1-yard run (Al Del Greco kick). Tied 14–14.
- PHI – Heath Sherman 2-yard pass from Randall Cunningham (Roger Ruzek kick). Eagles 21–14.

**Fourth quarter**

- PHO – Al Del Greco 25-yard field goal. Eagles 21–17.
- PHO – Al Del Greco 50-yard field goal. Eagles 21–20.
- PHO – Al Del Greco 42-yard field goal. Cardinals 23–20.

**Top passers**

- PHO – Timm Rosenbach – 11/19, 116 yards, INT
- PHI – Randall Cunningham – 17/24, 252 yards, 2 TD, 2 INT

**Top rushers**

- PHO – Johnny Johnson – 22 rushes, 88 yards, TD
- PHI – Randall Cunningham – 6 rushes, 34 yards, TD

**Top receivers**

- PHO – Ricky Proehl – 4 receptions, 72 yards
- PHI – Mickey Shuler – 6 receptions, 63 yards

==== Week 3: at New Orleans Saints ====
Week 3: Phoenix Cardinals at New Orleans Saints – Game summary

| Quarter | 1 | 2 | 3 | 4 | Total |
|---|---|---|---|---|---|
| Cardinals | 0 | 0 | 7 | 0 | **7** |
| **Saints** | 0 | 7 | 7 | 14 | **28** |

at Louisiana Superdome, New Orleans, Louisiana

- Date: September 23
- Game time: 12:00 p.m. CST/11:00 a.m. MST
- Game weather: None (Indoor stadium)
- Game attendance: 61,110
- Box Score

Game information

**First quarter**

- No scoring plays

**Second quarter**

- NO – Eric Martin 14-yard pass from John Fourcade (Morten Andersen kick). Saints 7–0.

**Third quarter**

- PHO – Ricky Proehl 37-yard pass from Timm Rosenbach (Al Del Greco kick). Tied 7–7.
- NO – Rueben Mayes 10-yard run (Morten Andersen kick). Saints 14–7.

**Fourth quarter**

- NO – Rueben Mayes 4-yard run (Morten Andersen kick). Saints 21–7.
- NO – Rueben Mayes 14-yard run (Morten Andersen kick). Saints 28–7.

**Top passers**

- PHO – Timm Rosenbach – 14/26, 191 yards, TD, INT
- NO – John Fourcade – 11/23, 151 yards, TD, INT

**Top rushers**

- PHO – Johnny Johnson – 22 rushes, 68 yards
- NO – Rueben Mayes – 16 rushes, 99 yards, 3 TD

**Top receivers**

- PHO – Ricky Proehl – 5 receptions, 62 yards, TD
- NO – Floyd Turner – 2 receptions, 55 yards

==== Week 4: vs. Washington Redskins ====
Week 4: Washington Redskins at Phoenix Cardinals – Game summary

| Quarter | 1 | 2 | 3 | 4 | Total |
|---|---|---|---|---|---|
| **Redskins** | 0 | 7 | 10 | 21 | **38** |
| Cardinals | 0 | 10 | 0 | 0 | **10** |

at Sun Devil Stadium, Tempe, Arizona

- Date: September 30
- Game time: 6:00 p.m. MST
- Game weather: 78 °F (26 °C)
- Game attendance: 49,303
- Box Score

Game information

**First quarter**

- No scoring plays

**Second quarter**

- PHO – Al Del Greco 32-yard field goal. Cardinals 3–0.
- WAS – Gerald Riggs 1-yard run (Chip Lohmiller kick). Redskins 7–3.
- PHO – Roy Green 12-yard pass from Timm Rosenbach (Al Del Greco kick). Cardinals 10–7.

**Third quarter**

- WAS – Chip Lohmiller 26-yard field goal. Tied 10–10.
- WAS – Gary Clark 42-yard pass from Stan Humphries (Chip Lohmiller kick). Redskins 17–10.

**Fourth quarter**

- WAS – Stan Humphries 1-yard run (Chip Lohmiller kick). Redskins 24–10.
- WAS – Gary Clark 42-yard pass from Stan Humphries (Chip Lohmiller kick). Redskins 31–10.
- WAS – Earnest Byner 1-yard run (Chip Lohmiller kick). Redskins 38–10.

**Top passers**

- WAS – Stan Humphries – 20/25, 257 yards, 2 TD
- PHO – Timm Rosenbach – 11/23, 91 yards, TD, INT

**Top rushers**

- WAS – Gerald Riggs – 19 rushes, 95 yards, TD
- PHO – Johnny Johnson – 16 rushes, 93 yards

**Top receivers**

- WAS – Gary Clark – 8 receptions, 162 yards, 2 TD
- PHO – Roy Green – 4 receptions, 56 yards, TD

==== Week 6: vs. Dallas Cowboys ====
Week 6: Dallas Cowboys at Phoenix Cardinals – Game summary

| Quarter | 1 | 2 | 3 | 4 | Total |
|---|---|---|---|---|---|
| Cowboys | 0 | 0 | 3 | 0 | **3** |
| **Cardinals** | 7 | 3 | 0 | 10 | **20** |

at Sun Devil Stadium, Tempe, Arizona

- Date: October 14
- Game time: 2:00 p.m. MST
- Game weather: 77 °F (25 °C)
- Game attendance: 45,235
- Box Score

Game information

**First quarter**

- PHO – Anthony Thompson 1-yard run (Al Del Greco kick). Cardinals 7–0.

**Second quarter**

- PHO – Al Del Greco 28-yard field goal. Cardinals 10–0.

**Third quarter**

- DAL – Ken Willis 37-yard field goal. Cardinals 10–3.

**Fourth quarter**

- PHO – Al Del Greco 28-yard field goal. Cardinals 13–3.
- PHO – Johnny Johnson 9-yard run (Al Del Greco kick). Cardinals 20–3

**Top passers**

- DAL – Troy Aikman – 9/25, 61 yards, 2 INT
- PHO – Timm Rosenbach – 19/27, 171 yards

**Top rushers**

- DAL – Emmitt Smith – 12 rushes, 48 yards
- PHO – Johnny Johnson – 19 rushes, 120 yards, TD

**Top receivers**

- DAL – Jay Novacek – 3 receptions, 26 yards
- PHO – Ricky Proehl – 4 receptions, 61 yards

==== Week 7: at New York Giants ====
Week 7: Phoenix Cardinals at New York Giants – Game summary

| Quarter | 1 | 2 | 3 | 4 | Total |
|---|---|---|---|---|---|
| Cardinals | 3 | 7 | 6 | 3 | **19** |
| **Giants** | 7 | 3 | 0 | 10 | **20** |

at Giants Stadium, East Rutherford, New Jersey

- Date: October 21
- Game time: 4:00 p.m. EST/2:00 p.m. MST
- Game weather: 57 °F (14 °C)
- Game attendance: 76,518
- Box Score

Game information

**First quarter**

- NYG – Ottis Anderson 4-yard run (Matt Bahr kick). Giants 7–0.
- PHO – Al Del Greco 39-yard field goal. Giants 7–3.

**Second quarter**

- NYG – Matt Bahr 34-yard field goal. Giants 10–3.
- PHO – Luis Sharpe 1-yard pass from Timm Rosenbach (Al Del Greco kick). Tied 10–10.

**Third quarter**

- PHO – Al Del Greco 18-yard field goal. Cardinals 13–10.
- PHO – Al Del Greco 34-yard field goal. Cardinals 16–10.
- PHO – Al Del Greco 45-yard field goal. Cardinals 19–10.

**Fourth quarter**

- NYG – Stephen Baker 38-yard pass from Jeff Hostetler (Matt Bahr kick). Cardinals 19–17.
- NYG – Matt Bahr 42-yard field goal. Giants 20–19.

**Top passers**

- PHO – Timm Rosenbach – 11/20, 102 yards, TD
- NYG – Jeff Hostetler – 11/21, 180 yards, TD, INT

**Top rushers**

- PHO – Johnny Johnson – 30 rushes, 108 yards
- NYG – Ottis Anderson – 11 rushes, 88 yards, TD

**Top receivers**

- PHO – Ricky Proehl – 2 receptions, 33 yards
- NYG – Stephen Baker – 3 receptions, 65 yards, TD

==== Week 8: vs. Chicago Bears ====
Week 8: Chicago Bears at Phoenix Cardinals – Game summary

| Quarter | 1 | 2 | 3 | 4 | Total |
|---|---|---|---|---|---|
| **Bears** | 7 | 21 | 0 | 3 | **31** |
| Cardinals | 0 | 7 | 7 | 7 | **21** |

at Sun Devil Stadium, Tempe, Arizona

- Date: October 28
- Game time: 2:00 p.m. MST
- Game weather: 80 °F (27 °C)
- Game attendance: 71,233
- Box Score

Game information

**First quarter**

- CHI – Neal Anderson 2-yard run (Kevin Butler kick). Bears 7–0.

**Second quarter**

- CHI – Jim Harbaugh 1-yard run (Kevin Butler kick). Bears 14–0.
- CHI – Ron Morris 67-yard pass from Jim Harbaugh (Kevin Butler kick). Bears 21–0.
- CHI – Neal Anderson 2-yard run (Kevin Butler kick). Bears 28–0.
- PHO – J. T. Smith 3-yard pass from Timm Rosenbach (Al Del Greco kick). Bears 28–7.

**Third quarter**

- PHO – Johnny Johnson 21-yard run (Al Del Greco kick). Bears 28–14

**Fourth quarter**

- CHI – Kevin Butler 33-yard field goal. Bears 31–14
- PHO – Roy Green 40-yard pass from Timm Rosenbach (Al Del Greco kick). Bears 31–21.

**Top passers**

- CHI – Jim Harbaugh – 9/14, 166 yards, TD, INT
- PHO – Timm Rosenbach – 18/30, 256 yards, TD

**Top rushers**

- CHI – Brad Muster – 12 rushes, 99 yards
- PHO – Johnny Johnson – 16 rushes, 74 yards, TD

**Top receivers**

- CHI – Ron Morris – 3 receptions, 93 yards, TD
- PHO – Roy Green – 5 receptions, 89 yards, TD

==== Week 9: at Miami Dolphins ====
Week 9: Phoenix Cardinals at Miami Dolphins – Game summary

| Quarter | 1 | 2 | 3 | 4 | Total |
|---|---|---|---|---|---|
| Cardinals | 0 | 3 | 0 | 0 | **3** |
| **Dolphins** | 3 | 10 | 10 | 0 | **23** |

at Joe Robbie Stadium, Miami Gardens, Florida

- Date: November 4
- Game time: 1:00 p.m. EST/11:00 a.m. MST
- Game weather: 77 °F (25 °C)
- Game attendance: 54,294
- Box Score

Game information

**First quarter**

- MIA – Pete Stoyanovich 19-yard field goal. Dolphins 3–0.

**Second quarter**

- MIA – Tony Paige 17-yard pass from Dan Marino (Pete Stoyanovich kick). Dolphins 10–0.
- MIA – Pete Stoyanovich 21-yard field goal. Dolphins 13–0.
- PHO – Al Del Greco 44-yard field goal. Dolphins 13–3.

**Third quarter**

- MIA – Mark Clayton 7-yard pass from Dan Marino (Pete Stoyanovich kick). Dolphins 20–3.
- MIA – Pete Stoyanovich 19-yard field goal. Dolphins 23–3.

**Fourth quarter**

- No scoring plays

**Top passers**

- PHO – Timm Rosenbach – 13/25, 172 yards
- MIA – Dan Marino – 18/25, 205 yards, 2 TD

**Top rushers**

- PHO – Timm Rosenbach – 6 rushes, 32 yards
- MIA – Marc Logan – 14 rushes, 62 yards

**Top receivers**

- PHO – Roy Green – 1 reception, 45 yards
- MIA – Ferrell Edmunds – 2 receptions, 58 yards

==== Week 10: at Buffalo Bills ====
Week 10: Phoenix Cardinals at Buffalo Bills – Game summary

| Quarter | 1 | 2 | 3 | 4 | Total |
|---|---|---|---|---|---|
| Cardinals | 7 | 0 | 7 | 0 | **14** |
| **Bills** | 0 | 21 | 0 | 24 | **45** |

at Rich Stadium, Orchard Park, New York

- Date: November 11
- Game time: 1:00 p.m. EST/11:00 a.m. MST
- Game weather: 37 °F (3 °C)
- Game attendance: 74,904
- Box Score

Game information

**First quarter**

- PHO – Johnny Johnson 1-yard run (Al Del Greco kick). Cardinals 7–0.

**Second quarter**

- BUF – Keith McKeller 18-yard pass from Jim Kelly (Scott Norwood kick). Tied 7–7.
- BUF – Butch Rolle 1-yard pass from Jim Kelly (Scott Norwood kick). Bills 14–7.
- BUF – Steve Tasker 24-yard pass from Jim Kelly (Scott Norwood kick). Bills 21–7.

**Third quarter**

- PHO – Ernie Jones 29-yard pass from Timm Rosenbach (Al Del Greco kick). Bills 21–14.

**Fourth quarter**

- BUF – Scott Norwood 25-yard field goal. Bills 24–14.
- BUF – Don Beebe 11-yard pass from Jim Kelly (Scott Norwood kick). Bills 31–14.
- BUF – Jamie Mueller 1-yard run (Scott Norwood kick). Bills 38–14.
- BUF – Kenneth Davis 13-yard run (Scott Norwood kick). Bills 45–14.

**Top passers**

- PHO – Timm Rosenbach – 5/10, 74 yards, TD, INT
- BUF – Jim Kelly – 11/16, 165 yards, 4 TD, INT

**Top rushers**

- PHO – Johnny Johnson – 20 rushes, 66 yards, TD
- BUF – Thurman Thomas – 26 rushes, 112 yards

**Top receivers**

- PHO – Ernie Jones – 2 receptions, 38 yards, TD
- BUF – Don Beebe – 2 receptions, 60 yards, TD

==== Week 11: vs. Green Bay Packers ====
Week 11: Green Bay Packers at Phoenix Cardinals – Game summary

| Quarter | 1 | 2 | 3 | 4 | Total |
|---|---|---|---|---|---|
| **Packers** | 7 | 3 | 0 | 14 | **24** |
| Cardinals | 0 | 7 | 7 | 7 | **21** |

at Sun Devil Stadium, Tempe, Arizona

- Date: November 18
- Game time: 2:00 p.m. MST
- Game weather: 70 °F (21 °C)
- Game attendance: 46,878
- Box Score

Game information

**First quarter**

- GB – Sterling Sharpe 54-yard pass from Don Majkowski (Chris Jacke kick). Packers 7–0.

**Second quarter**

- GB – Chris Jacke 21-yard field goal. Packers 10–0
- PHO – Ernie Jones 22-yard pass from Timm Rosenbach (Al Del Greco kick). Cardinals 10–7.

**Third quarter**

- PHO – Roy Green 27-yard pass from Timm Rosenbach (Al Del Greco kick). Cardinals 14–10.

**Fourth quarter**

- PHO – Ernie Jones 25-yard pass from Timm Rosenbach (Al Del Greco kick). Cardinals 21–10.
- GB – Clarence Weathers 15-yard pass from Anthony Dilweg (Chris Jacke kick). Cardinals 21–17.
- GB – Ed West 1-yard pass from Anthony Dilweg (Chris Jacke kick). Packers 24–21.

**Top passers**

- GB – Don Majkowski – 9/13, 143 yards, TD, INT
- PHO – Timm Rosenbach – 17/35, 285 yards, 3 TD, INT

**Top rushers**

- GB – Anthony Dilweg – 5 rushes, 50 yards
- PHO – Johnny Johnson – 15 rushes, 103 yards

**Top receivers**

- GB – Sterling Sharpe – 10 receptions, 157 yards, TD
- PHO – Ernie Jones – 7 receptions, 117 yards, 2 TD

==== Week 12: vs. New England Patriots ====
Week 12: New England Patriots at Phoenix Cardinals – Game summary

| Quarter | 1 | 2 | 3 | 4 | Total |
|---|---|---|---|---|---|
| Patriots | 7 | 7 | 0 | 0 | **14** |
| **Cardinals** | 7 | 7 | 10 | 10 | **34** |

at Sun Devil Stadium, Tempe, Arizona

- Date: November 25
- Game time: 2:00 p.m. MST
- Game weather: 68 °F (20 °C)
- Game attendance: 30,110
- Box Score

Game information

**First quarter**

- PHO – Anthony Thompson 5-yard run (Al Del Greco kick). Cardinals 7–0.
- NE – John Stephens 18-yard pass from Tom Hodson (Jason Staurovsky kick). Tied 7–7.

**Second quarter**

- PHO – Timm Rosenbach 2-yard run (Al Del Greco kick). Cardinals 14–7.
- NE – Marv Cook 22-yard pass from Tom Hodson (Jason Staurovsky kick). Tied 14–14.

**Third quarter**

- PHO – Al Del Greco 29-yard field goal. Cardinals 17–14.
- PHO – Timm Rosenbach 6-yard run (Al Del Greco kick). Cardinals 24–14.

**Fourth quarter**

- PHO – Terrence Flagler 29-yard run (Al Del Greco kick). Cardinals 31–14.
- PHO – Al Del Greco 50-yard field goal. Cardinals 34–14.

**Top passers**

- NE – Tom Hodson – 17/29, 182 yards, 2 TD
- PHO – Timm Rosenbach – 15/26, 188 yards

**Top rushers**

- NE – John Stephens – 11 rushes, 54 yards
- PHO – Anthony Thompson – 28 rushes, 136 yards, TD

**Top receivers**

- NE – Cedric Jones – 3 receptions, 47 yards
- PHO – Roy Green – 5 receptions, 67 yards

==== Week 13: vs. Indianapolis Colts ====
Week 13: Indianapolis Colts at Phoenix Cardinals – Game summary

| Quarter | 1 | 2 | 3 | 4 | Total |
|---|---|---|---|---|---|
| Colts | 10 | 0 | 7 | 0 | **17** |
| **Cardinals** | 0 | 6 | 0 | 14 | **20** |

at Sun Devil Stadium, Tempe, Arizona

- Date: December 2
- Game time: 2:00 p.m. MST
- Game weather: 57 °F (14 °C)
- Game attendance: 31,885
- Box Score

Game information

**First quarter**

- IND – Dean Biasucci 49-yard field goal. Colts 3–0.
- IND – Anthony Johnson 15-yard pass from Jeff George (Dean Biasucci kick). Colts 10–0.

**Second quarter**

- PHO – Al Del Greco 32-yard field goal. Colts 10–3.
- PHO – Al Del Greco 39-yard field goal. Colts 10–6.

**Third quarter**

- IND – Jessie Hester 6-yard pass from Jeff George (Dean Biasucci kick). Colts 17–6.

**Fourth quarter**

- PHO – Timm Rosenbach 1-yard run (Al Del Greco kick). Colts 17–13.
- PHO – Marcus Turner 21-yard interception return (Al Del Greco kick). Cardinals 20–17.

**Top passers**

- IND – Jeff George – 13/28, 168 yards, 2 TD, INT
- PHO – Timm Rosenbach – 12/26, 164 yards

**Top rushers**

- IND – Eric Dickerson – 17 rushes, 60 yards
- PHO – Anthony Thompson – 18 rushes, 74 yards

**Top receivers**

- IND – Jessie Hester – 4 receptions, 89 yards, TD
- PHO – Ernie Jones – 4 receptions, 67 yards

==== Week 14: at Atlanta Falcons ====
Week 14: Phoenix Cardinals at Atlanta Falcons – Game summary

| Quarter | 1 | 2 | 3 | 4 | Total |
|---|---|---|---|---|---|
| **Cardinals** | 0 | 10 | 7 | 7 | **24** |
| Falcons | 3 | 7 | 0 | 3 | **13** |

at Atlanta–Fulton County Stadium, Atlanta, Georgia

- Date: December 9
- Game time: 1:00 p.m. EST/11:00 a.m. MST
- Game weather: 45 °F (7 °C)
- Game attendance: 36,222
- Box Score

Game information

**First quarter**

- ATL – Greg Davis 41-yard field goal. Falcons 3–0.

**Second quarter**

- PHO – Ricky Proehl 45-yard pass from Timm Rosenbach (Al Del Greco kick). Cardinals 7–3.
- ATL – Gary Wilkins 20-yard pass from Scott Campbell (Greg Davis kick). Falcons 10–7.
- PHO – Al Del Greco 37-yard field goal. Tied 10–10.

**Third quarter**

- PHO – Anthony Thompson 1-yard run (Al Del Greco kick). Cardinals 17–10.

**Fourth quarter**

- ATL – Greg Davis 24-yard field goal. Cardinals 17–13.
- PHO – Marcus Turner 47-yard interception return (Al Del Greco kick). Cardinals 24–13.

**Top passers**

- PHO – Timm Rosenbach – 15/29, 227 yards, TD, INT
- ATL – Scott Campbell – 13/30, 198 yards, TD, 3 INT

**Top rushers**

- PHO – Anthony Thompson – 26 rushes, 96 yards, TD
- ATL – Mike Rozier – 10 rushes, 54 yards

**Top receivers**

- PHO – Ricky Proehl – 6 receptions, 102 yards, TD
- ATL – Andre Rison – 3 receptions, 65 yards

==== Week 15: at Dallas Cowboys ====
Week 15: Phoenix Cardinals at Dallas Cowboys – Game summary

| Quarter | 1 | 2 | 3 | 4 | Total |
|---|---|---|---|---|---|
| Cardinals | 3 | 0 | 0 | 7 | **10** |
| Cowboys | 13 | 7 | 7 | 14 | **41** |

at Texas Stadium, Irving, Texas

- Date: December 16
- Game time: 1:00 p.m. CST/12:00 p.m. MST
- Game weather: 48 °F (9 °C)
- Game attendance: 60,190
- Box Score

Game information

**First quarter**

- PHO – Al Del Greco 38-yard field goal. Cardinals 3–0.
- DAL – Emmitt Smith 1-yard run (kick failed). Cowboys 6–3.
- DAL – Emmitt Smith 11-yard run (Ken Willis kick). Cowboys 13–3.

**Second quarter**

- DAL – Michael Irvin 8-yard pass from Troy Aikman (Ken Willis kick). Cowboys 20–3.

**Third quarter**

- DAL – Emmitt Smith 1-yard run (Ken Willis kick). Cowboys 27–3.

**Fourth quarter**

- DAL – Emmitt Smith 6-yard run (Ken Willis kick). Cowboys 34–3.
- PHO – Johnny Johnson 1-yard run (Al Del Greco kick). Cowboys 34–10.
- DAL – Daryl Johnston 6-yard run (Ken Willis kick). Cowboys 41–10.

**Top passers**

- PHO – Timm Rosenbach – 14/35, 151 yards, 3 INT
- DAL – Troy Aikman – 12/18, 164 yards, TD, INT

**Top rushers**

- PHO – Johnny Johnson – 13 rushes, 22 yards, TD
- DAL – Emmitt Smith – 24 rushes, 103 yards, 4 TD

**Top receivers**

- PHO – Ernie Jones – 4 receptions, 57 yards
- DAL – Michael Irvin – 4 receptions, 91 yards, TD

==== Week 17: vs. Philadelphia Eagles ====
Week 17: Philadelphia Eagles at Phoenix Cardinals – Game summary

| Quarter | 1 | 2 | 3 | 4 | Total |
|---|---|---|---|---|---|
| **Eagles** | 7 | 6 | 7 | 3 | **23** |
| Cardinals | 0 | 7 | 0 | 14 | **21** |

at Sun Devil Stadium, Tempe, Arizona

- Date: December 29
- Game time: 2:00 p.m. MST
- Game weather: 49 °F (9 °C)
- Game attendance: 31,796
- Box Score

Game information

**First quarter**

- PHI – Fred Barnett 16-yard pass from Randall Cunningham (Roger Ruzek kick). Eagles 7–0.

**Second quarter**

- PHI – Calvin Williams 27-yard pass from Randall Cunningham (kick failed). Eagles 13–0.
- PHO – Roy Green 12-yard pass from Timm Rosenbach (Al Del Greco kick). Eagles 13–7.

**Third quarter**

- PHI – Fred Barnett 3-yard pass from Randall Cunningham (Roger Ruzek kick). Eagles 20–7.

**Fourth quarter**

- PHI – Roger Ruzek 44-yard field goak. Eagles 23–7.
- PHO – Ricky Proehl 38-yard pass from Timm Rosenbach (Al Del Greco kick). Eagles 23–14.
- PHO – J. T. Smith 45-yard pass from Timm Rosenbach (Al Del Greco kick). Eagles 23–21.

**Top passers**

- PHI – Randall Cunningham – 13/19, 172 yards, 3 TD, INT
- PHO – Timm Rosenbach – 19/31, 301 yards, 3 TD, INT

**Top rushers**

- PHI – Anthony Toney – 12 rushes, 61 yards
- PHO – Johnny Johnson – 15 rushes, 31 yards

**Top receivers**

- PHI – Fred Barnett – 5 receptions, 76 yards, 2 TD
- PHO – Ricky Proehl – 7 receptions, 132 yards, TD

=== Standings ===
NFC East
| | W | L | T | PCT | DIV | CONF | PF | PA | STK |
|---|---|---|---|---|---|---|---|---|---|
| ^{(2)} New York Giants | 13 | 3 | 0 | .813 | 7–1 | 10–2 | 335 | 211 | W2 |
| ^{(4)} Philadelphia Eagles | 10 | 6 | 0 | .625 | 5–3 | 9–3 | 396 | 299 | W3 |
| ^{(5)} Washington Redskins | 10 | 6 | 0 | .625 | 4–4 | 7–5 | 381 | 301 | W1 |
| Dallas Cowboys | 7 | 9 | 0 | .438 | 2–6 | 6–8 | 244 | 308 | L2 |
| Phoenix Cardinals | 5 | 11 | 0 | .313 | 2–6 | 3–9 | 268 | 396 | L3 |
