= Body Bag Game =

American football game between the Philadelphia Eagles and Washington Redskins

The Body Bag Game
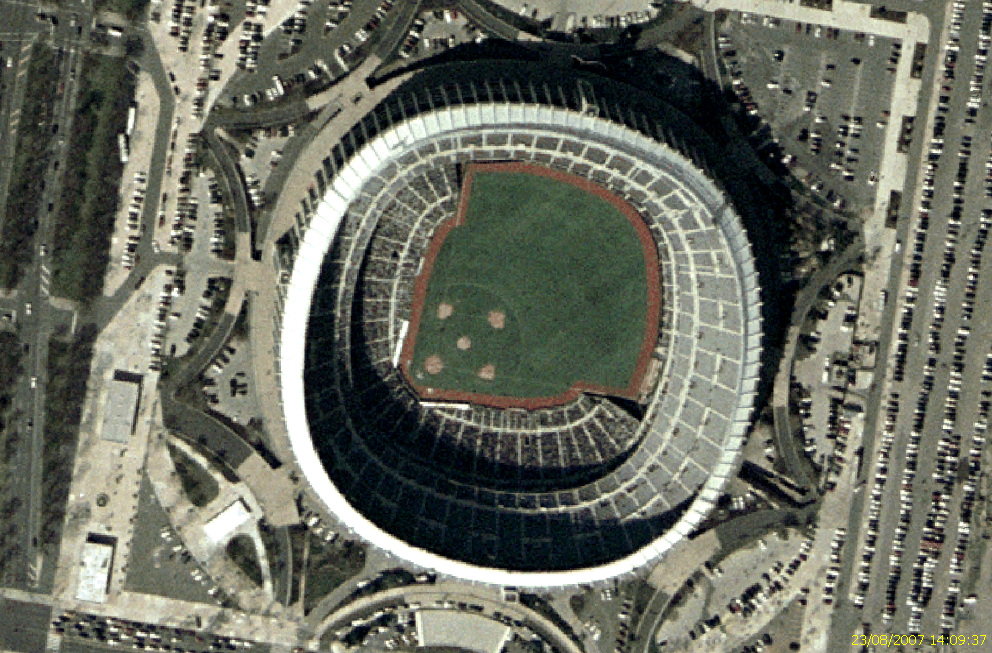
- Veterans Stadium, the site of the game
Washington Redskins (5–3)	Philadelphia Eagles (4–4)
14	28
Head coach: Joe Gibbs	Head coach: Buddy Ryan
	1	2	3	4	Total
WAS	0	7	0	7	14
PHI	7	0	21	0	28
- Date: November 12, 1990
- Stadium: Veterans Stadium; Philadelphia, Pennsylvania, U.S.
- Referee: Jerry Markbreit

TV in the United States
- Network: ABC
- Announcers: Al Michaels, Frank Gifford, and Dan Dierdorf

The Body Bag Game was a Monday Night Football game played on November 12, 1990, between the Philadelphia Eagles and Washington Redskins at Veterans Stadium. The Eagles defeated the Redskins, 28–14. Its nickname comes from a pre-game boast from Eagles head coach Buddy Ryan, who told reporters his team would inflict a beating on Washington so bad "they'll have to be carted off in body bags". Then during the game, nine Washington Redskins players left with injuries, and an Eagles player reacted to one of those injured Redskins by yelling, "Do you guys need any more body bags?"

== Background and game ==
This was the second game of the year between the two NFC East rivals. The Redskins were two years removed from winning Super Bowl XXII, but were an aging team, behind a new quarterback, Jeff Rutledge. The Eagles were in their fifth season under defensive mastermind Buddy Ryan, but coming off two straight early playoff exits. In the previous game, on October 21, the 3–2 Redskins beat the 2–3 Eagles 13–7, behind a rushing touchdown by Gerald Riggs and two Chip Lohmiller field goals. The rematch came three weeks later, on Monday Night Football, with the second-place Redskins being 5–3 and the third-place Eagles being 4–4.

The Eagles scored first, on a 30-yard interception return for a touchdown by cornerback William Frizzell. In the second quarter, the Redskins tied the game 7–7 behind a Rutledge pass to tight end Don Warren. However, by the third quarter, the Eagles took control with three touchdowns. The first came on a trick play, with fullback Keith Byars throwing a 9-yard pass to Heath Sherman. The second came via the defense, with defensive end Clyde Simmons returning a fumble 18 yards. The final touchdown was another pass to Sherman, this time by quarterback Randall Cunningham. The Redskins finished the scoring in the fourth quarter, with Brian Mitchell scoring on a one-yard run, but it would not lead to a comeback, with the Eagles winning 28–14.

During this game, nine Redskins players were injured, including starting quarterback Jeff Rutledge and backup Stan Humphries. Washington, already playing without quarterbacks Mark Rypien (who was injured earlier in the season) and Gary Hogeboom (inactive), had to end the game with rookie running back Brian Mitchell at quarterback. Mitchell, who had played quarterback in college, went 3-for-6 for 40 yards passing, and also ran for a touchdown.

== List of Redskins players who were injured ==
1. Walter Stanley (Sprained knee)
2. Greg Manusky (Sprained knee)
3. Gerald Riggs (Sprained foot)
4. Jeff Rutledge (Broken thumb)
5. Stan Humphries (Sprained knee)
6. 4 unacknowledged players

== Aftermath ==
Following the Body Bag Game, the Eagles won five of their last seven under Cunningham, finished the season 10–6 and earned a wild card playoff berth, the fourth seed in the tough NFC. The Redskins meanwhile also won five of their last seven to finish the season 10–6, losing the number four seed to the Eagles. Despite this, the Redskins would return to Veterans Stadium and defeat the Eagles in the Wild Card playoff game, 20–6. The Redskins lost to defending Super Bowl champion San Francisco in the divisional round. However, as told in the NFL Network presentation America's Game: The Story of the 1991 Washington Redskins, coach Joe Gibbs and others pointed to this game as the foundation for the successes of the 1991 Redskins, who would go on to win Super Bowl XXVI.

After the season, the NFL addressed the problem of two quarterbacks being injured in the same game by instituting the third quarterback rule, which would allow an NFL team to dress a third quarterback outside of the 45-man game-day roster. Under that rule, the third quarterback could be played, but if he entered the game before the fourth quarter, neither of the other quarterbacks could return to the game. That rule was changed again for the 2011 season when the game-day roster size was increased to 46.

== Scoring summary ==
- PHI: Frizzell 30-yard interception return (Ruzek kick)
- WAS: Warren 8-yard pass from Rutledge (Lohmiller kick)
- PHI: Sherman 9-yard pass from Byars (Ruzek kick)
- PHI: Simmons 18-yard fumble recovery (Ruzek kick)
- PHI: Sherman 2-yard pass from Cunningham (Ruzek kick)
- WAS: Mitchell 1-yard run (Lohmiller kick)

== Officials ==
- Referee: Jerry Markbreit (#9)
- Umpire: Bob Boylston (#101)
- Head linesman: Leo Miles (#35)
- Line judge: Dale Orem (#51)
- Back judge: Doug Toole (#4)
- Side judge: Bill Quinby (#58)
- Field judge: Bill Schmitz (#122)

== See also ==
- Commanders–Eagles rivalry
- List of nicknamed NFL games and plays
