= Third quarterback rule =

NFL rule (1991–2010, 2023–present)

The third quarterback rule is a policy in the National Football League governing the use of a third quarterback in addition to the starter and the backup. It has existed in two iterations.

The original rule was in place from 1991 to 2010. In 2010, the last year the rule was in effect, teams could dress 45 players for game day. If they had two quarterbacks dressed for the game, they were allowed to dress a third quarterback who did not count toward that limit. However, if the third quarterback entered the game at any position before the third quarter ended, the starter and backup quarterbacks became ineligible to play for the rest of the game. The third quarterback, however, could play in the fourth quarter while preserving the eligibility of the starter and backup. The rule was abolished for the 2011 season, when the NFL increased the roster size to allow 46 players to dress for a game.

The full text of the original rule was:

Teams will be permitted an Active List of 45 players and an Inactive List of eight players for each regular-season and postseason game. Provided, that if a club has two quarterbacks on its 45-player Active List, a third quarterback from its Inactive List is permitted to dress for the game, but if he enters the game during the first three quarters, the other two quarterbacks are thereafter prohibited from playing.

Although it is not specifically indicated, the NFL had interpreted its rule to mean that in order to designate a third quarterback, the two on the active roster must both be "bona fide" quarterbacks, not other position players merely designated as quarterbacks.

The NFL implemented a revised rule for the 2023 NFL season. The third quarterback can be placed on an inactive roster spot where he would not use a spot as one of the 48 active players on game day, but has to be on the 53-man active roster and not one of the two elevated practice squad players. He may enter the game if the quarterbacks on the active roster are injured or disqualified. Unlike with the rule put in place in 1991, if a quarterback from the active roster is medically cleared to enter the game he may do so and the third quarterback must leave the game.

== History ==
=== First rule ===
The third quarterback rule was instituted for the 1991 NFL season in reaction to a 1990 game between the Washington Redskins and the Philadelphia Eagles. In that game, sometimes called the "Body Bag Game", the Redskins lost both starting quarterback Jeff Rutledge and backup Stan Humphries to injuries. Without a third quarterback on their active roster, the Redskins had to use a player unsuited for that position. Brian Mitchell, a running back who played quarterback in college, completed the game in the quarterback position. The Eagles won the game, 28–14.

The rule was nearly triggered in Week 1 in 1999 when Tom Tupa went into a game for the New York Jets against the New England Patriots after starter Vinny Testaverde tore his Achilles tendon and was lost for the season during the first quarter. Head coach Bill Parcells made the decision before the game to have Tupa (who was primarily a punter but was drafted as a quarterback in 1988) as the backup quarterback and Rick Mirer as the emergency quarterback. Had Parcells put Mirer in before the fourth quarter, Tupa would not have been allowed to play for even his normal punting duties. Tupa went 6-of-10 for 165 yards and two touchdowns and kept the game close before the fourth quarter hit and Parcells was able to replace Tupa with Mirer at quarterback without penalty.

In the 2010 NFC Championship Game between the Green Bay Packers and Chicago Bears, the rule was triggered with 57 seconds left in the third quarter. The Bears' starting quarterback, Jay Cutler, suffered from an MCL sprain just after halftime. His replacement, Todd Collins, was pulled after throwing four poor passes including two near interceptions in what would be his final NFL game of his 16-year career. When Caleb Hanie, the Bears' designated third quarterback entered the game before the fourth quarter, it meant that the Bears could not return either Cutler or Collins to the field the rest of the game. Hanie played well and almost led the Bears back from a 14–0 deficit, but the Packers won the game, 21–14.

In the 2011 season, the active roster was increased to 46 players, and the ability to dress an extra quarterback was revoked. In 2020, the collective bargaining agreement added a similar rule for offensive linemen: teams can dress 48 players for game day provided they have at least eight linemen active; if they do not, they can only have 47 players dressed.

=== Second rule ===
A revised version of the rule was introduced in 2023. This came in the wake of the San Francisco 49ers sustaining injuries to both of their active quarterbacks Brock Purdy and Josh Johnson in the NFC Championship Game. If the rule existed before the game, practice squad quarterback Jacob Eason could have taken over. Since his injury was the catalyst for the new policy, it has been nicknamed the Brock Purdy Rule.

The policy emulated the one used by the revived United States Football League.
