= 1992 Philadelphia Eagles season =

NFL team season

- Owner: Norman Braman
- Head coach: Rich Kotite
- Offensive coordinator: Rich Kotite
- Defensive coordinator: Bud Carson
- Home stadium: Veterans Stadium

Results
- Record: 11–5
- Division place: 2nd NFC East
- Playoffs: Won Wild Card Playoffs (at Saints) 36–20; Lost Divisional Playoffs (at Cowboys) 10–34

Uniform
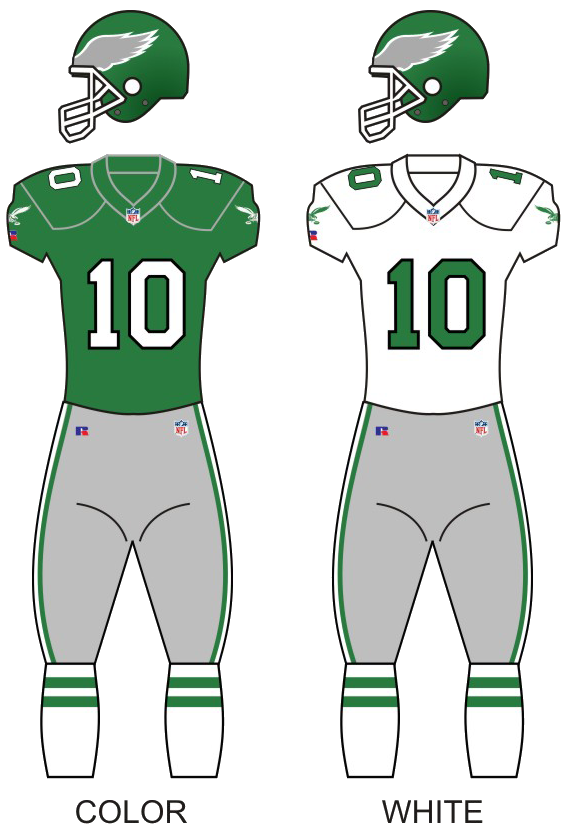

The 1992 Philadelphia Eagles season was their 60th in the National Football League (NFL). The team fought through adversity from the start and improved upon their previous total of 10–6, winning eleven games and returning to the playoffs after a year out. The Eagles would win a playoff game for the first time since 1980, but lost in the Divisional round to their Division Rival and eventual Super Bowl winning Dallas Cowboys.

This was the first season the team was sponsored by the Russell Athletic brand. The sponsorship lasted until the 1996 season.

After winning four in a row and five of their last six regular-season games, the Eagles kept the momentum going and posted their first playoff victory since the 1980 NFC Championship Game, topping the Saints in New Orleans in the Wild Card playoffs. It was also their first playoff win on the road, since the 1949 NFL Championship Game. Season highlights included: the first 4–0 start since going 6–0 to begin the 1981 campaign, a home shutout of the Denver Broncos on September 20, a memorable seven-play goal line stand in a 7–3 win over the Cardinals on October 25, a come-from-behind 47–34 win over the New York Giants at the Meadowlands (which included a Vai Sikahema punt return for a touchdown and his iconic boxing with the padding at the base of the goal posts), and cornerback Eric Allen batting away a Mark Rypien pass at the goal line to seal a playoff-spot-clinching 17–13 decision against the Washington Redskins on December 20.

The entire season was the focus of Mark Bowden's best-selling book "Bringing the Heat", which also dealt in detail with prominent recent-term figures who were not with the 1992 Eagles. This included tight end Keith Jackson who became the first prominent NFL player to use his newly granted rights of full and unrestricted free agency and signed a deal with the Miami Dolphins several weeks into the season, and former coach Buddy Ryan who struggled through a TV commentator's role two years after he was fired as the Eagles coach. However, Ryan remained a huge (and not always positive) influence on the 1992 Eagles (particularly through the defensive players who remained loyal to him, and who were indifferent at best about Rich Kotite's leadership). Bowden's book also described the personal issues that Eagles players faced, the friction between how injuries should be (or were) treated by the team's medical staff, and the story of hugely successful but haunted then-team owner Norman Braman.

The last remaining active member of the 1992 Philadelphia Eagles was punter Jeff Feagles, who retired after the 2009 season.

== Offseason ==
The Eagles were represented at the 1992 Winter Olympics in Albertville. Herschel Walker also represented the United States in the two-man bobsled event. Walker and Brian Shimer's sled finished seventh and missed a medal by 0.32 seconds, and was the higher finishing American team. Walker signed with the Eagles as a free agent on June 22.

=== Jerome Brown's death ===
Tragedy struck the team when, on June 25, 1992, defensive tackle Jerome Brown lost control of his Chevrolet Corvette at high speed before crashing into a palm tree, killing Brown and his nephew Gus. Later that evening in Philadelphia, in front of a large gathering at Veterans Stadium and a national television audience who were participating in a Billy Graham Crusade, Reggie White broke the news of his teammate's passing to the shock of the audience.

The Eagles retired number 99 in honor of Brown, kept his locker untouched, and wore a patch with his initials and number on their jerseys. They also adopted rallying cries "Bring It Home For Jerome" and “1-2-3-JB”, referring to their desire to win the Super Bowl for their fallen teammate.

=== NFL draft ===
The Eagles had a 10–6 record in 1991 and tied with three other teams. Because of this, they selected the 16th to 20th pick on a rotating basis in the 12 rounds. They traded away their first round pick earlier, which was made by the Dallas Cowboys. With their pick in the second round, they chose Siran Stacy, a running back out of the University of Alabama. The Eagles selected 12 players over the 12 rounds.

1992 Philadelphia Eagles draft
Round	Pick	Player	Position	College	Notes
2	48	Siran Stacy	Running back	Alabama	
3	75	Tommy Jeter	Defensive tackle	Texas	
4	92	Tony Brooks	Running back	Notre Dame	
4	102	Casey Weldon	Quarterback	Florida State	
5	129	Corey Barlow	Defensive back	Auburn	
6	160	Jeff Sydner	Wide receiver	Hawaii	
7	187	William Boatwright	Guard	Virginia Tech	
8	214	Chuck Bullough	Linebacker	Michigan State	
9	241	Ephesians Bartley	Linebacker	Florida	
10	272	Mark McMillian	Defensive back	Alabama	
11	299	Pumpy Tudors	Punter	Chattanooga	
12	326	Brandon Houston	Offensive tackle	Oklahoma	
Made roster

== Personnel ==
=== Staff / Coaches ===
1992 Philadelphia Eagles staff
Front office: Owner – Norman Braman; President/chief operating officer – Harry Gamble; Director of player personnel – Joe Woolley; Head coaches: Head coach – Rich Kotite; Offensive coaches: Quarterbacks – Zeke Bratkowski; Running backs – Dick Wood; Receivers – Lew Carpenter; Tight ends – Dave Atkins; Offensive line – Bill Muir	Defensive coaches: Defensive coordinator/secondary – Bud Carson; Defensive line – Dale Haupt; Linebackers – Jim Vechiarella; Defensive assistant – Peter Giunta; Special teams coaches: Special Teams Coordinator – Larry Pasquale; Strength and conditioning: Strength and conditioning – Jim Williams

=== Roster ===
1992 Philadelphia Eagles roster
Quarterbacks (QB): 18 David Archer; 12 Randall Cunningham; 9 Jim McMahon; 11 Casey Weldon; Running backs (RB): 41 Keith Byars TE; 32 James Joseph FB; 23 Heath Sherman; 22 Vai Sikahema; 27 Siran Stacy; 34 Herschel Walker; Wide receivers (WR): 86 Fred Barnett; 81 Roy Green; 85 Jeff Sydner; 89 Calvin Williams; Tight ends (TE): 83 Pat Beach; 87 Maurice Johnson	Offensive linemen (OL): 72 David Alexander C; 62 Brian Baldinger G/T; 78 Antone Davis T; 61 Eric Floyd G; 73 Ron Heller T; 79 Mike Schad G; 75 Rob Selby G/T; 63 Daryle Smith T; Defensive linemen (DL): 95 Mike Flores DE; 90 Mike Golic DT; 91 Andy Harmon DT; 98 Tommy Jeter DT; 74 Mike Pitts DT; 96 Clyde Simmons DE; 92 Reggie White DE	Linebackers (LB): 50 Ephesians Bartley OLB; 56 Byron Evans MLB; 59 Seth Joyner OLB; 57 Scott Kowalkowski OLB; 55 Ken Rose OLB; 51 William Thomas OLB; Defensive backs (DB): 21 Eric Allen CB; 42 John Booty FS; 33 William Frizzell CB/S; 25 Tom Gerhart CB/S; 46 Izel Jenkins CB; 29 Mark McMillian CB; 38 Rich Miano SS; 30 Otis Smith CB; Special teams (ST): 5 Jeff Feagles P; 7 Roger Ruzek K	Practice squad: 58 Andre Powell LB; Reserve: 24 Corey Barlow CB (NF-Ill.); 52 Jack Bradford LB (IR); 39 Tony Brooks RB (IR); 54 Britt Hager LB (IR); 48 Wes Hopkins S (IR); 76 John Hudson LS (IR); 35 Chris Mitchell S (PUP); 36 Keith Neubert TE (IR); 53 Brad Quast LB (IR); 97 Leon Seals DT (IR); 26 Ben Smith CB (PUP); 20 Andre Waters S (IR); 47 active, 12 inactive, 1 practice squad Rookies in italics

== Regular season ==
=== Schedule ===
Week	Date	Opponent	Result	Record	Venue	Attendance
1	September 6	New Orleans Saints	**W** 15–13	1–0	Veterans Stadium	63,513
2	September 13	at **Phoenix Cardinals**	**W** 31–14	2–0	Sun Devil Stadium	42,533
3	September 20	Denver Broncos	**W** 30–0	3–0	Veterans Stadium	65,833
4	Bye					
5	October 5	**Dallas Cowboys**	**W** 31–7	4–0	Veterans Stadium	66,572
6	October 11	at Kansas City Chiefs	**L** 17–24	4–1	Arrowhead Stadium	76,626
7	October 18	at Washington Redskins	**L** 12–16	4–2	RFK Stadium	56,380
8	October 25	**Phoenix Cardinals**	**W** 7–3	5–2	Veterans Stadium	64,676
9	November 1	at **Dallas Cowboys**	**L** 10–20	5–3	Texas Stadium	65,012
10	November 8	Los Angeles Raiders	**W** 31–10	6–3	Veterans Stadium	65,388
11	November 15	at Green Bay Packers	**L** 24–27	6–4	Milwaukee County Stadium	52,689
12	November 22	at **New York Giants**	**W** 47–34	7–4	Giants Stadium	68,153
13	November 29	at San Francisco 49ers	**L** 14–20	7–5	Candlestick Park	64,374
14	December 6	Minnesota Vikings	**W** 28–17	8–5	Veterans Stadium	65,280
15	December 13	at Seattle Seahawks	**W** 20–17 (OT)	9–5	Kingdome	47,492
16	December 20	**Washington Redskins**	**W** 17–13	10–5	Veterans Stadium	65,841
17	December 27	**New York Giants**	**W** 20–10	11–5	Veterans Stadium	64,266

Note: Intra-division opponents are in bold text.

=== Game summaries ===
==== Week 1: vs. New Orleans Saints ====
New Orleans Saints at Philadelphia Eagles

Team	1	2	3	4	Total
Saints	3	3	0	7	13
• **Eagles**	6	3	0	6	15

- Date: September 6
- Location: Veterans Stadium, Philadelphia
- Game start: 1:00 p.m. EST
- Game weather: 68 °F or 20 °C (Light Rain)
- Referee: Dale Hamer
- TV announcers (CBS): Jim Nantz & Dan Fouts
- Source: Pro-Football-Reference.com

==== Week 2: at Phoenix Cardinals ====
Philadelphia Eagles at Phoenix Cardinals

Team	1	2	3	4	Total
• **Eagles**	3	14	7	7	31
Cardinals	0	14	0	0	14

- Date: September 13
- Location: Sun Devil Stadium, Tempe, Arizona
- Game start: 6:00 p.m. PST
- Referee: Bernie Kukar
- TV announcers (TNT): Gary Bender & Pat Haden
- Source: Pro-Football-Reference.com

==== Week 3: vs. Denver Broncos ====
Denver Broncos at Philadelphia Eagles

Team	1	2	3	4	Total
Broncos	0	0	0	0	0
• **Eagles**	3	14	10	3	30

- Date: September 20
- Location: Veterans Stadium, Philadelphia
- Game start: 1:00 p.m. EST
- Game weather: 77 °F or 25 °C (Sunny)
- Referee: Larry Nemmers
- TV announcers (NBC): Marv Albert & Bill Parcells
- Source: Pro-Football-Reference.com

==== Week 5: vs. Dallas Cowboys ====
Dallas Cowboys at Philadelphia Eagles

Team	1	2	3	4	Total
Cowboys	7	0	0	0	7
• **Eagles**	10	0	7	14	31

- Date: October 5
- Location: Veterans Stadium, Philadelphia
- Game start: 9:00 p.m. EST
- Game weather: 47 °F or 8.3 °C (Clear)
- Referee: Jerry Markbreit
- TV announcers (ABC): Al Michaels, Frank Gifford, and Dan Dierdorf
- Source: Pro-Football-Reference.com

==== Week 6: at Kansas City Chiefs ====
Philadelphia Eagles at Kansas City Chiefs

Team	1	2	3	4	Total
Eagles	0	3	0	14	17
• **Chiefs**	7	7	7	3	24

- Date: October 11
- Location: Arrowhead Stadium, Kansas City, Missouri
- Game start: 12:00 p.m. CST
- Game weather: 50 °F or 10 °C, wind 10 miles per hour (16 km/h; 8.7 kn)
- Referee: Dick Hantak
- TV announcers (CBS): Verne Lundquist & Dan Fouts
- Source: Pro-Football-Reference.com

This game ended the longest ever gap between two NFL teams meeting. It was the first time since October 22, 1972 that the Eagles played against the Chiefs. and only their second-ever matchup. This occurred because in previous seasons when the AFC West and NFC East met each other, either the Eagles or the Chiefs (but never both) finished in the fifth position and did not play the ordinary set of interconference games.

==== Week 7: at Washington Redskins ====
Philadelphia Eagles at Washington Redskins

Team	1	2	3	4	Total
Eagles	0	3	0	9	12
• **Redskins**	7	3	3	3	16

- Date: October 18
- Location: RFK Stadium, Washington, D.C.
- Game start: 1:00 p.m. EST
- Referee: Red Cashion
- TV announcers (CBS): Pat Summerall & John Madden

==== Week 8: vs. Phoenix Cardinals ====
Phoenix Cardinals at Philadelphia Eagles

Team	1	2	3	4	Total
Cardinals	0	0	0	3	3
• **Eagles**	0	7	0	0	7

- Date: October 25
- Location: Veterans Stadium, Philadelphia
- Game start: 1:00 p.m. EST
- Game weather: 50 °F or 10 °C (Cloudy)
- Referee: Gary Lane
- TV announcers (CBS): Tim Ryan & Matt Millen

In a game with only 10 total points, the Eagles stopped the Cardinals on at least 7 tries from the Philadelphia 1-yard line and got a 4th-down stop to hold Phoenix scoreless. The drive became famously titled "The 1 Yard War."

==== Week 9: at Dallas Cowboys ====
Philadelphia Eagles at Dallas Cowboys

Team	1	2	3	4	Total
Eagles	0	0	10	0	10
• **Cowboys**	0	3	7	10	20

- Date: November 1
- Location: Texas Stadium, Irving, Texas
- Game start: 3:00 p.m. CST
- Referee: Bob McElwee
- TV announcers (CBS): Pat Summerall & John Madden
- Source: Pro-Football-Reference.com

After Randall Cunningham played poorly in the 1st half, Rich Kotite benched him and put Jim McMahon in as the QB for the 2nd half. While Philadelphia lost, McMahon played much better than Cunningham had, and after the game Kotite said McMahon would also start the following week vs. the Raiders.

==== Week 10: vs. Los Angeles Raiders ====
Los Angeles Raiders at Philadelphia Eagles

Team	1	2	3	4	Total
Raiders	0	3	0	7	10
• **Eagles**	3	14	7	7	31

- Date: November 8
- Location: Veterans Stadium, Philadelphia
- Game start: 1:00 p.m. EST
- Game weather: 43 °F or 6.1 °C (Sunny)
- Referee: Tom White
- TV announcers (NBC): Dick Enberg & Bob Trumpy
- Source: Pro-Football-Reference.com

==== Week 11: at Green Bay Packers ====
Philadelphia Eagles at Green Bay Packers

Team	1	2	3	4	Total
Eagles	3	0	7	14	24
• **Packers**	0	14	0	13	27

- Date: November 15
- Location: Milwaukee County Stadium, Milwaukee, Wisconsin
- Game start: 12:00 p.m. EST
- Referee: Gerald Austin
- TV announcers (CBS): James Brown & George Starke
- Source: Pro-Football-Reference.com

==== Week 12: at New York Giants ====
Philadelphia Eagles at New York Giants

Team	1	2	3	4	Total
• **Eagles**	0	20	20	7	47
Giants	10	10	7	7	34

- Date: November 22
- Location: Giants Stadium, East Rutherford, New Jersey
- Game start: 1:00 p.m. EST
- Game weather: 60 °F or 15.6 °C, wind 13 mph
- Referee: Dick Hantak
- TV announcers (CBS): Dick Stockton & Randy Cross
- Source: Pro-Football-Reference.com

Scoring summary
1	Giants	Matt Bahr 35 yard field goal	Giants 3–0
1	Giants	Dave Meggett 14 yard pass from Jeff Hostetler (Matt Bahr kick)	Giants 10–0
2	Eagles	Herschel Walker 21 yard pass from Randall Cunningham (kick failed)	Giants 10–6
2	Giants	Dave Meggett 92 yard kickoff return (Matt Bahr kick)	Giants 17–6
2	Giants	Matt Bahr 44 yard field goal	Giants 20–6
2	Eagles	Seth Joyner 43 yard interception return (Roger Ruzek kick)	Giants 20–13
2	Eagles	Herschel Walker 11 yard run (Roger Ruzek kick)	Tie 20–20
3	Eagles	Keith Byars 38 yard pass from Randall Cunningham (Roger Ruzek kick)	Eagles 27–20
3	Eagles	Ken Rose 3 yard blocked punt return (Roger Ruzek kick)	Eagles 34–20
3	Eagles	Vai Sikahema 87 yard punt return (kick failed)	Eagles 40–20
3	Giants	Ed McCaffrey 18 yard pass from Kent Graham (Matt Bahr kick)	Eagles 40–27
4	Eagles	Heath Sherman 30 yard run (Roger Ruzek kick)	Eagles 47–27
4	Giants	Rodney Hampton 2 yard run (Matt Bahr kick)	Eagles 47–34

==== Week 13: at San Francisco 49ers ====
Philadelphia Eagles at San Francisco 49ers

Team	1	2	3	4	Total
Eagles	0	0	7	7	14
• **49ers**	7	3	3	7	20

- Date: November 29
- Location: Candlestick Park, San Francisco, California
- Game start: 1:00 p.m. PST
- Referee: Howard Roe
- TV announcers (CBS): Pat Summerall & John Madden
- Source: Pro-Football-Reference.com

==== Week 14: vs. Minnesota Vikings ====
Minnesota Vikings at Philadelphia Eagles

Team	1	2	3	4	Total
Vikings	3	7	0	7	17
• **Eagles**	7	7	7	7	28

- Date: December 6
- Location: Veterans Stadium, Philadelphia
- Game start: 1:00 p.m. EST
- Game weather: 38 °F or 3.3 °C (Cloudy)
- Referee: Gordon McCarter
- TV announcers (CBS): Verne Lundquist & Dan Fouts
- Source: Pro-Football-Reference.com

==== Week 15: at Seattle Seahawks ====
Philadelphia Eagles at Seattle Seahawks

Team	1	2	3	4	OT	Total
• **Eagles**	3	7	0	7	3	20
Seahawks	3	7	0	7	0	17

- Date: December 13
- Location: The Kingdome, Seattle, Washington
- Game start: 1:00 p.m. PST
- Game weather: indoors (dome)
- Referee: Pat Haggerty
- TV announcers (CBS): James Brown & John Robinson
- Source: Pro-Football-Reference.com

==== Week 16: vs. Washington Redskins ====
Washington Redskins at Philadelphia Eagles

Team	1	2	3	4	Total
Redskins	0	13	0	0	13
• **Eagles**	0	7	7	3	17

- Date: December 20
- Location: Veterans Stadium, Philadelphia
- Game start: 1:00 p.m. EST
- Game weather: 47 °F or 8.3 °C (Cloudy)
- Referee: Dale Hamer
- TV announcers (CBS): Pat Summerall & John Madden
- Source: Pro-Football-Reference.com

The game ended when Mark Rypien aimed an on-target pass to WR Gary Clark for Washington, but Eagle CB Eric Allen got a hand on part of the ball and knocked it away from Clark as time ran out.

==== Week 17: vs. New York Giants ====
New York Giants at Philadelphia Eagles

Team	1	2	3	4	Total
Giants	0	0	3	7	10
• **Eagles**	7	10	0	3	20

- Date: December 27
- Location: Veterans Stadium, Philadelphia
- Game start: 1:00 p.m. EST
- Game weather: 34 °F or 1.1 °C (Sunny)
- Referee: Red Cashion
- TV announcers (CBS): Tim Ryan & Matt Millen
- Source: Pro-Football-Reference.com

=== Standings ===
NFC East
	W	L	T	PCT	DIV	CONF	PF	PA	STK
^{(2)} Dallas Cowboys	13	3	0	.813	6–2	9–3	409	243	W2
^{(5)} Philadelphia Eagles	11	5	0	.688	6–2	8–4	354	245	W4
^{(6)} Washington Redskins	9	7	0	.563	4–4	7–5	300	255	L2
New York Giants	6	10	0	.375	2–6	4–8	306	367	L1
Phoenix Cardinals	4	12	0	.250	2–6	4–10	243	332	L2

== Postseason ==
=== Schedule ===
Round	Date	Opponent (seed)	Result	Record	Venue	Recap
Wild Card	January 3, 1993	at New Orleans Saints (4)	W 36–20	1–0	Louisiana Superdome	Recap
Divisional	January 10, 1993	at Dallas Cowboys (2)	L 10–34	1–1	Texas Stadium	Recap

=== Game summaries ===
==== NFC Wild Card Playoffs: at (4) New Orleans Saints ====
NFC Wild Card Playoffs: (5) Philadelphia Eagles at (4) New Orleans Saints – Game summary

Quarter	1	2	3	4	Total
Eagles	7	0	3	26	36
Saints	7	10	3	0	20

at Louisiana Superdome, New Orleans, Louisiana

- Date: January 3, 1993
- Game time: 4:00 p.m. EST/3:00 p.m. CST
- Game weather: Played indoors, domed stadium
- Game attendance: 68,591
- Referee: Dale Hamer
- TV announcers (CBS): Pat Summerall (play-by-play) and John Madden (color commentator)

Game information

First quarter

- NO – Craig Heyward 1-yard run (Morten Andersen kick). Saints 7–0.
- PHI – Fred Barnett 57-yard pass from Randall Cunningham (Roger Ruzek kick). Tied 7–7.

Second quarter

- NO – Morten Andersen 35-yard field goal. Saints 10–7.
- NO – Quinn Early 7-yard pass from Bobby Hebert (Morten Andersen kick). Saints 17–7.

Third quarter

- NO – Morten Andersen 42-yard field goal. Saints 20–7.

Fourth quarter

- PHI – Roger Ruzek 40-yard field goal. Saints 20–10.
- PHI – Fred Barnett 35-yard pass from Randall Cunningham (Roger Ruzek kick). Saints 20–17.
- PHI – Heath Sherman 6-yard run (Roger Ruzek kick). Eagles 24–20.
- PHI – Safety, Reggie White sacked Bobby Hebert in end zone. Eagles 26–20.
- PHI – Roger Ruzek 39-yard field goal. Eagles 29–20.
- PHI – Eric Allen 18-yard interception return (Roger Ruzek kick). Eagles 36–20.

Top passers

- PHI – Randall Cunningham – 19/35, 219 yards, 2 TD
- NO – Bobby Hebert – 23/39, 291 yards, TD, 3 INT

Top rushers

- PHI – Heath Sherman – 21 rushes, 105 yards, TD
- NO – Vaughn Dunbar – 4 rushes, 28 yards

Top receivers

- PHI – Fred Barnett – 4 receptions, 102 yards, 2 TD
- NO – Quinn Early – 7 receptions, 93 yards, TD

==== NFC Divisional Playoffs: at (2) Dallas Cowboys ====
NFC Wild Card Playoffs: (5) Philadelphia Eagles at (2) Dallas Cowboys – Game summary

Quarter	1	2	3	4	Total
Eagles	3	0	0	7	10
Cowboys	7	10	10	7	34

at Texas Stadium, Irving, Texas

- Date: January 10, 1993
- Game time: 12:30 p.m. EST/11:30 a.m. CST
- Game weather: 57 °F (14 °C), partly cloudy
- Game attendance: 63,721
- Referee: Tom White
- TV announcers (CBS): Verne Lundquist (play-by-play) and Dan Fouts (color commentator)

Game information

First quarter

- PHI – Roger Ruzek 32-yard field goal. Eagles 3–0.
- DAL – Derek Tennell 1-yard pass from Troy Aikman (Lin Elliott kick). Cowboys 7–3.

Second quarter

- DAL – Jay Novacek 6-yard pass from Troy Aikman (Lin Elliott kick). Cowboys 14–3.
- DAL – Lin Elliott 20-yard field goal. Cowboys 17–3.

Third quarter

- DAL – Emmitt Smith 23-yard run (Lin Elliott kick). Cowboys 24–3.
- DAL – Lin Elliott 43-yard field goal. Cowboys 27–3.

Fourth quarter

- DAL – Derrick Gainer 1-yard run (Lin Elliott kick). Cowboys 34–3.
- PHI – Calvin Williams 18-yard pass from Randall Cunningham (Roger Ruzek kick). Cowboys 34–10.

Top passers

- PHI – Randall Cunningham – 17/30, 160 yards, TD
- DAL – Troy Aikman – 15/25, 200 yards, 2 TD

Top rushers

- PHI – Herschel Walker – 6 rushes, 29 yards
- DAL – Emmitt Smith – 25 rushes, 114 yards, TD

Top receivers

- PHI – Calvin Williams – 4 receptions, 48 yards
- DAL – Michael Irvin – 6 receptions, 88 yards
