= Gene Barth =

American football official (1930–1991)

Gene Barth football trading card

Eugene Fred Barth (February 1, 1930 – October 11, 1991) was an American football official in the National Football League (NFL). He was the referee in Super Bowl XVIII, played January 22, 1984.

== NFL career ==
Barth began his career in the NFL as a line judge in 1971 on the crew of referee Jim Tunney, then became a referee four years later when Fred Swearingen returned to his previous position of field judge (now back judge). He was selected to officiate Super Bowl XVIII, and was chosen as an alternate for Super Bowl XXIII. He retired after the 1990 season (Tunney also retired after 1990); his last game was the January 5, 1991 NFC wild card game between the Washington Redskins and Philadelphia Eagles.

Barth wore uniform number 14, previously worn by referee Bob Finley and later worn by referees Ron Winter and Shawn Smith.

== Biography ==
In addition to officiating in the NFL, Barth was the president of an oil company.

Barth was born February 1, 1930, in St. Louis, Missouri. He graduated from Saint Louis University. He was president of Bonafide Oil Company, located in Hazelwood, Missouri at 5735 Fee Fee Road, a family-owned business. He participated in the St. Louis Senior Olympics in 1989 and 1990.

Barth played five seasons of minor league baseball from age 18 to age 22. A first baseman and outfielder, Barth played from 1948 to 1952 for teams in the St. Louis Cardinals minor league system. He spent two seasons with the Hamilton Cardinals and two with the St. Joseph Cardinals. Barth had a career batting average of.293 with 60 home runs in 614 career games. In 1951 while playing with St. Joseph, Barth led the Western Association with 103 Runs Batted In on the season.

Barth died of cancer at St. Joseph Health Center in St. Charles, Missouri on Friday, October 11, 1991. He was 61 years old. All NFL officials wore a black armband with Barth's number 14 for the remainder of the 1991 NFL season starting with week eight (October 20).
