= 1990 Philadelphia Eagles season =

NFL team season

- Owner: Norman Braman
- Head coach: Buddy Ryan
- Offensive coordinator: Rich Kotite
- Defensive coordinator: Jeff Fisher
- Home stadium: Veterans Stadium

Results
- Record: 10–6
- Division place: 2nd NFC East
- Playoffs: Lost Wild Card Playoffs (vs. Redskins) 6–20

Uniform
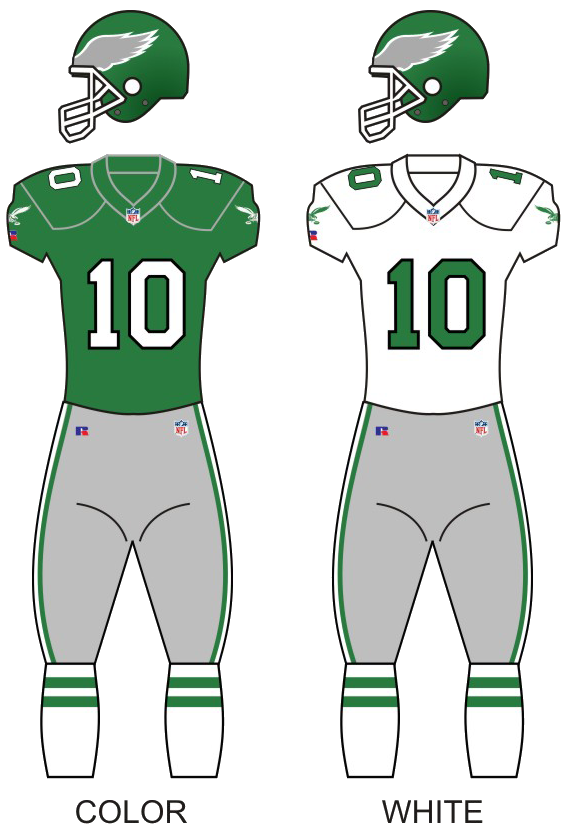

The 1990 Philadelphia Eagles season was the team's 58th in the National Football League (NFL).

The team made the postseason yet again with a 10–6 overall record, despite beginning the season with disappointing early-season records of 1–3 and 2–4.

The Eagles ran for 2,556 rushing yards in 1990, which is the most of any team in a single season in the 1990s.

Other season highlights were a 28–14 win at Veterans Stadium over the Washington Redskins on November 12, known as the Body Bag Game, since the defense managed to knock both Redskins quarterbacks from the contest plus several other key players. The Redskins came back to the Vet later in the season to defeat the Eagles in the Wild Card Playoff, however. Against the Buffalo Bills in a 30–23 loss on December 2, Randall Cunningham made one of the signature plays of his career, eluding Bills Hall of Fame defensive end Bruce Smith in the end zone before launching the ball into the middle of the field to wide receiver Fred Barnett, who completed the 95-yard touchdown play.

One week prior, the Eagles avenged an opening-night loss at the Meadowlands, whipping the 10–0 New York Giants by a 31–13 score. The Redskins would get the last laugh, beating the Eagles 20–6 in the Wild Card round.

Following the season, the team fired head coach Buddy Ryan. Offensive coordinator Rich Kotite was promoted to replace Ryan as Eagles head coach, and would hold the position for the next four seasons.

== Offseason ==
=== NFL draft ===
The 1990 NFL draft was held April 22–23, 1990. The league also held a supplemental draft after the regular draft and before the regular season. For the number 1 pick in the draft, the Indianapolis Colts traded with the Atlanta Falcons to select Jeff George a quarterback from Illinois

Under the rules of the draft at the time, the Eagles would pick 24th or 25th in each full round. Teams that went to Super Bowl XXIV would have last 2 picks and then teams sorted out by 1989 record in each round. The Eagles at 11–5 in the previous year tied with Los Angeles Rams. With the 22nd pick in the 1st round the Eagles selected Ben Smith a cornerback from Georgia The Eagles made 12 total picks in the 1990 draft.

1990 Philadelphia Eagles draft
Round	Pick	Player	Position	College	Notes
1	22	Ben Smith	DB	Georgia	
2	50	Mike Bellamy	WR	Illinois	
3	77	Fred Barnett *	WR	Arkansas State	
5	133	Calvin Williams	WR	Purdue	
6	162	Kevin Thompson	DB	Oklahoma	
7	189	Terry Strouf	T	Wisconsin–La Crosse	
8	217	Curt Dykes	T	Oregon	
9	244	Cecil Gray	DE	North Carolina	
10	273	Orlando Adams	DT	Jacksonville State	
11	294	John Hudson	G	Auburn	Made roster in 1991; pick from New Orleans
11	300	Tyrone Watson	WR	Tennessee State	
12	327	Judd Garrett	RB	Princeton	
Made roster * Made at least one Pro Bowl during career

=== Training camp ===
The Eagles held training camp at West Chester State University in West Chester, PA about 20 miles from Veterans Stadium where they play their home games.

== Personnel ==
=== Staff ===
1990 Philadelphia Eagles staff
Front office: Owner – Norman Braman; President/Chief Operating Officer – Harry Gamble; Director of player personnel – Joe Woolley; Head coaches: Head coach – Buddy Ryan; Offensive coaches: Offensive coordinator/Quarterbacks – Rich Kotite; Running Backs – Dave Atkins; Receivers – Lew Carpenter; Offensive line – Dan Neal; Offensive line – Bill Walsh	Defensive coaches: Defensive coordinator/Linebackers – Jeff Fisher; Defensive line – Dale Haupt; Linebackers – Ronnie Jones; Defensive backs – Tom Bettis; Special teams coaches: Special teams – Al Roberts; Strength and conditioning: Strength and conditioning – Ronnie Jones

=== Roster ===
1990 Philadelphia Eagles roster
Quarterbacks (QB): 12 Randall Cunningham; 9 Jim McMahon; Running backs (RB): 41 Keith Byars; 45 Thomas Sanders KR; 23 Heath Sherman; 25 Anthony Toney; 43 Roger Vick FB; Wide receivers (WR): 86 Fred Barnett; 81 Mike Bellamy; 80 Rod Harris PR; 83 Kenny Jackson; 89 Calvin Williams; Tight ends (TE): 88 Keith Jackson; 87 Harper LeBel LS; 85 Mickey Shuler	Offensive linemen (OL): 72 David Alexander C; 75 Louis Cheek G/T; 69 Bruce Collie G; 73 Ron Heller T; 79 Mike Schad G; 68 Reggie Singletary T; 63 Daryle Smith T; 66 Ron Solt G; 61 Ben Tamburello C/G; Defensive linemen (DL): 99 Jerome Brown DT; 97 Dick Chapura DT; 90 Mike Golic DT; 71 Cecil Gray DT; 94 Steve Kaufusi DE; 74 Mike Pitts DT; 96 Clyde Simmons DE; 92 Reggie White DE	Linebackers (LB): 56 Byron Evans MLB; 54 Britt Hager MLB; 95 Al Harris OLB; 59 Seth Joyner OLB; 55 Ken Rose OLB; 52 Jessie Small OLB; Defensive backs (DB): 21 Eric Allen CB; 33 William Frizzell SS; 34 Terry Hoage FS; 48 Wes Hopkins FS; 46 Izel Jenkins CB; 26 Ben Smith CB; 20 Andre Waters SS; Special teams (ST): 5 Jeff Feagles P; 7 Roger Ruzek K	Practice squad: 36 Robert Drummond RB; 47 Maurice Johnson TE; 98 Horacio Moronta DT; 51 Ricky Shaw LB; 22 Kevin Thompson S; Reserve: 78 Matt Darwin T (IR); 76 John Hudson C/G (PUP); 82 Mike Quick WR (IR); 30 Otis Smith CB (PUP); 10 John Teltschik P (PUP); -- Eric Wainwright LB (IR); 47 active, 6 inactive, 5 practice squad Rookies in italics

== Regular season ==
=== Schedule ===
Week	Date	Opponent	Result	Record	Venue	Attendance
1	September 9	at **New York Giants**	**L** 20–27	0–1	Giants Stadium	76,202
2	September 16	**Phoenix Cardinals**	**L** 21–23	0–2	Veterans Stadium	64,396
3	September 23	at Los Angeles Rams	**W** 27–21	1–2	Anaheim Stadium	63,644
4	September 30	Indianapolis Colts	**L** 23–24	1–3	Veterans Stadium	62,067
5	Bye					
6	October 15	Minnesota Vikings	**W** 32–24	2–3	Veterans Stadium	66,296
7	October 21	at **Washington Redskins**	**L** 7–13	2–4	RFK Stadium	53,567
8	October 28	at **Dallas Cowboys**	**W** 21–20	3–4	Texas Stadium	62,605
9	November 4	New England Patriots	**W** 48–20	4–4	Veterans Stadium	65,514
10	November 12	**Washington Redskins**	**W** 28–14	5–4	Veterans Stadium	65,857
11	November 18	at Atlanta Falcons	**W** 24–23	6–4	Atlanta–Fulton County Stadium	53,755
12	November 25	**New York Giants**	**W** 31–13	7–4	Veterans Stadium	66,706
13	December 2	at Buffalo Bills	**L** 23–30	7–5	Rich Stadium	79,320
14	December 9	at Miami Dolphins	**L** 20–23 (OT)	7–6	Joe Robbie Stadium	67,034
15	December 16	Green Bay Packers	**W** 31–0	8–6	Veterans Stadium	65,627
16	December 23	**Dallas Cowboys**	**W** 17–3	9–6	Veterans Stadium	63,895
17	December 29	at **Phoenix Cardinals**	**W** 23–21	10–6	Sun Devil Stadium	31,796

Note: Intra-division opponents are in bold text.

=== Game summaries ===
==== Week 1 ====
Team	1	2	3	4	Total
Eagles	3	7	0	10	20
• Giants	6	0	14	7	27

- Date: September 9
- Location: Giants Stadium, East Rutherford, New Jersey
- Game start: 8:00 p.m. EST
- Game weather: 64 °F (18 °C) • Wind 6 mph (9.7 km/h)
- Referee: Gordon McCarter
- TV announcers (TNT): Skip Caray and Pat Haden

==== Week 2 ====
Team	1	2	3	4	Total
• Cardinals	0	7	7	9	23
Eagles	14	0	7	0	21

- Date: September 16
- Location: Veterans Stadium, Philadelphia, Pennsylvania
- Game start: 1:00 p.m. EST
- Game weather: 71 °F (22 °C) (Cloudy) • Wind 9 mph (14 km/h)
- Referee: Gerald Austin
- Television network: CBS

==== Week 3 ====
Team	1	2	3	4	Total
• Eagles	3	14	3	7	27
Rams	7	7	0	7	21

- Date: September 23
- Location: Anaheim Stadium, Anaheim, California
- Game start: 1:00 p.m.
- Game weather: 69 °F (21 °C) • Wind 11 mph (18 km/h)
- Referee: Pat Haggerty
- TV announcers (CBS): Pat Summerall and John Madden

==== Week 4 ====
Team	1	2	3	4	Total
• Colts	7	3	7	7	24
Eagles	3	14	3	3	23

- Date: September 30
- Location: Veterans Stadium, Philadelphia, Pennsylvania
- Game start: 1:00 p.m. EST
- Game weather: 77 °F (25 °C) (Cloudy) • Wind 10 mph (16 km/h)
- Referee: Jim Tunney
- Television network: NBC

==== Week 6 ====
Team	1	2	3	4	Total
Vikings	7	14	0	3	24
• Eagles	9	0	6	17	32

- Date: October 15
- Location: Veterans Stadium, Philadelphia, Pennsylvania
- Game start: 9:00 p.m. EST
- Game weather: 61 °F (16 °C) (Clear) • Wind 12 mph (19 km/h)
- Referee: Gene Barth
- TV announcers (ABC): Al Michaels, Frank Gifford, Dan Dierdorf

==== Week 7 ====
Team	1	2	3	4	Total
Eagles	0	0	0	7	7
• Redskins	0	7	0	6	13

- Date: October 21
- Location: RFK Stadium, Washington, D.C.
- Game start: 1:00 p.m. EST
- Game weather: 55 °F (13 °C) • Wind 9 mph (14 km/h)
- Referee: Dale Hamer
- TV announcers (CBS): Pat Summerall and John Madden

==== Week 8 ====
Philadelphia Eagles (2–4) at Dallas Cowboys (3–4)

Quarter	1	2	3	4	Total
Eagles	7	0	0	14	**21**
Cowboys	0	3	3	14	**20**

at Texas Stadium • Irving, Texas

- Date: October 28
- Game time: 1:00 p.m.
- Game weather: 66 °F (19 °C); wind 6 mph (9.7 km/h)
- Game attendance: 62,605
- Referee: Howard Roe
- TV announcers (CBS): Tim Ryan and Irv Cross
- Pro-Football-Reference.com, The Football Database

Game information

Eagles

- Randall Cunningham
  17/30, 183 Yds, 2 TD
  9 Rush, 53 Yds
- Calvin Williams
  5 Rec, 74 Yds, TD

Cowboys

- Troy Aikman
  22/41, 223 Yds, TD, INT
- Tommie Agee
  6 Rush, 54 Yds
- Jay Novacek
  7 Rec, 105 Yds, TD

The Porkchop Bowl

Scoring summary

Quarter	Time	Drive			Team	Scoring information	Score	
Quarter	Time	Plays	Yards	TOP	Team	Scoring information	PHI	DAL
1	1:08				Eagles	Toney 10-yard touchdown reception from Cunningham, Ruzek kick good	7	0
2	0:13				Cowboys	43-yard field goal by Willis	7	3
3	12:11				Cowboys	43-yard field goal by Willis	7	6
4	10:30				Eagles	Sherman 10-yard touchdown run, Ruzek kick good	14	6
4	7:53				Cowboys	Novacek 29-yard touchdown reception from Aikman, Willis kick good	14	13
4	4:02				Cowboys	Smith 3-yard touchdown run, Willis kick good	14	20
4	0:44				Eagles	Williams 10-yard touchdown reception from Cunningham, Ruzek kick good	21	20
"TOP" = time of possession. For other American football terms, see Glossary of American football.							21	20

==== Week 9 ====
Team	1	2	3	4	Total
Patriots	3	7	3	7	20
• Eagles	10	10	7	21	48

- Date: November 4
- Location: Veterans Stadium, Philadelphia, Pennsylvania
- Game start: 1:00 p.m. EST
- Game weather: 75 °F (24 °C) (Cloudy) • Wind 8 mph (13 km/h)
- Referee: Dick Hantak
- TV announcers (NBC): Joel Meyers and Ahmad Rashad

==== Week 10 ====
Washington Redskins at Philadelphia Eagles

Team	1	2	3	4	Total
Redskins	0	7	0	7	14
• Eagles	7	0	21	0	28

- Date: November 12
- Location: Veterans Stadium, Philadelphia, Pennsylvania
- Game start: 9:00 p.m. EST
- Game weather: 38 °F (3 °C) (Cloudy) • Wind 26 mph (42 km/h)
- Referee: Jerry Markbreit
- TV announcers (ABC): Al Michaels, Frank Gifford, and Dan Dierdorf
- Source: Pro-Football-Reference.com

Scoring summary
1	PHI	William Frizzell 30 yard interception return (Roger Ruzek kick)	Eagles 7–0
2	WSH	Don Warren 8 yard pass from Jeff Rutledge (Chip Lohmiller kick)	Tie 7–7
3	PHI	Heath Sherman 9 yard pass from Keith Byars (Roger Ruzek kick)	Eagles 14–7
3	PHI	Clyde Simmons 18 yard fumble return (Roger Ruzek kick)	Eagles 21–7
3	PHI	Heath Sherman 2 yard pass from Randall Cunningham (Roger Ruzek kick)	Eagles 28–7
4	WSH	Brian Mitchell 1 yard run (Chip Lohmiller kick)	Eagles 28–14

This game came to be known as The Body Bag Game.

==== Week 11 ====
Team	1	2	3	4	Total
• Eagles	0	7	0	17	24
Falcons	0	10	3	10	23

- Date: November 18
- Location: Atlanta–Fulton County Stadium, Atlanta, Georgia
- Game start: 1:00 p.m. EST
- Game weather: 49 °F (9 °C) • Wind 8 mph (13 km/h)
- Referee: Gerald Austin
- TV announcers (CBS): Jim Nantz and Tim Brandt

==== Week 12 ====
New York Giants (10–0) at Philadelphia Eagles (6–4)

Quarter	1	2	3	4	Total
Giants	7	6	0	0	**13**
Eagles	7	7	3	14	**31**

at Veterans Stadium • Philadelphia, Pennsylvania

- Date: November 25
- Game time: 1:00 p.m. EST
- Game weather: Cloudy • 52 °F (11 °C) • Wind 13 mph (21 km/h)
- Referee: Red Cashion
- TV announcers (CBS): Dick Stockton and Merlin Olsen
- Pro-Football-Reference.com, The Football Database

Game information

Giants

- Phil Simms
  17/40, 234 Yds, 2 TD, 2 INT
- Dave Meggett
  2 Rush, 61 Yds
- Stephen Baker
  3 Rec, 65 Yds

Eagles

- Randall Cunningham
  17/31, 229 Yds, 2 TD
- Heath Sherman
  21 Rush, 71 Yds
- Keith Byars
  8 Rec, 128 Yds

Scoring summary

Quarter	Time	Drive			Team	Scoring information	Score	
Quarter	Time	Plays	Yards	TOP	Team	Scoring information	NYG	PHI
1	5:22				Giants	Ingram 15-yard touchdown reception from Simms, Bahr kick good	7	0
1	3:39				Eagles	Barnett 49-yard touchdown reception from Cunningham, Ruzek kick good	7	7
2	6:21				Eagles	Cunningham 1-yard touchdown run, Ruzek kick good	7	14
2	1:00				Giants	Bavaro 4-yard touchdown reception from Simms, Bahr kick no good	13	14
3	9:09				Eagles	39-yard field goal by Ruzek	13	17
4	13:12				Eagles	Williams 6-yard touchdown reception from Cunningham, Ruzek kick good	13	24
4	12:50				Eagles	Interception returned 22 yards for touchdown by Evans, Ruzek kick good	13	31
"TOP" = time of possession. For other American football terms, see Glossary of American football.							13	31

==== Week 13 ====
Team	1	2	3	4	Total
Eagles	0	16	7	0	23
• Bills	24	0	3	3	30

- Date: December 2
- Location: Rich Stadium, Orchard Park, New York
- Game start: 1:00 p.m. EST
- Game weather: 42 °F (6 °C) • Wind 16 mph (26 km/h)
- Referee: Tom Dooley
- TV announcers (CBS): Verne Lundquist and Dan Fouts

==== Week 14 ====
Team	1	2	3	4	OT	Total
Eagles	0	10	3	7	0	20
• Dolphins	10	0	0	10	3	23

- Date: December 9
- Location: Joe Robbie Stadium, Miami, Florida
- Game start: 8:00 p.m. EST
- Game weather: 59 °F (15 °C) • Wind 11 mph (18 km/h)
- Referee: Jerry Seeman
- TV announcers (ESPN): Mike Patrick and Joe Theismann

==== Week 15 ====
Team	1	2	3	4	Total
Packers	0	0	0	0	0
• Eagles	7	10	0	14	31

- Date: December 16
- Location: Veterans Stadium, Philadelphia, Pennsylvania
- Game start: 4:00 p.m. EST
- Game weather: 45 °F (7 °C) (Cloudy) • Wind 15 mph (24 km/h)
- Referee: Dale Hamer
- TV announcers (CBS): Dick Stockton and John Madden

==== Week 16 ====
Team	1	2	3	4	Total
Cowboys	0	3	0	0	3
• Eagles	7	3	0	7	17

- Date: December 23
- Location: Veterans Stadium, Philadelphia, Pennsylvania
- Game start: 1:00 p.m. EST
- Game weather: 66 °F (19 °C) (Light Rain) • Wind 15 mph (24 km/h)
- Referee: Gordon McCarter
- TV announcers (CBS): Tim Ryan and Irv Cross

==== Week 17 at Cardinals ====
Week Seventeen: Philadelphia Eagles (9–6) at Phoenix Cardinals (5–10)

Quarter	1	2	3	4	Total
**Eagles**	7	6	7	3	**23**
Cardinals	0	7	0	14	**21**

at Sun Devil Stadium, Tempe, Arizona

- Date: December 29, 1990
- Game time: 2:00 p.m. MDT
- Game weather: 49 °F (9 °C)
- Game attendance: 31,796
- Referee: Pat Haggerty
- TV announcers (CBS): Jack Buck and Dan Fouts
- Box score

=== Standings ===
NFC East
	W	L	T	PCT	DIV	CONF	PF	PA	STK
^{(2)} New York Giants	13	3	0	.813	7–1	10–2	335	211	W2
^{(4)} Philadelphia Eagles	10	6	0	.625	5–3	9–3	396	299	W3
^{(5)} Washington Redskins	10	6	0	.625	4–4	7–5	381	301	W1
Dallas Cowboys	7	9	0	.438	2–6	6–8	244	308	L2
Phoenix Cardinals	5	11	0	.313	2–6	3–9	268	396	L3

== Postseason ==
=== Schedule ===
Round	Date	Opponent (seed)	Result	Record	Venue	Recap
Wild Card	January 5, 1991	Washington Redskins (5)	L 6–20	0–1	Veterans Stadium	Recap

=== Game summaries ===
==== NFC Wild Card Playoffs: vs. (5) Washington Redskins ====
NFC Wild Card Playoffs: (5) Washington Redskins at (4) Philadelphia Eagles – Game summary

Quarter	1	2	3	4	Total
Redskins	0	10	10	0	20
Eagles	3	3	0	0	6

at Veterans Stadium, Philadelphia, Pennsylvania

- Date: January 5, 1991
- Game time: 12:30 p.m. EST
- Game weather: 31 °F (−1 °C), clear
- Game attendance: 65,287
- Referee: Gene Barth
- TV announcers (ABC): Brent Musburger (play-by-play) and Dick Vermeil (color commentator)

Game information

First quarter

- PHI – Roger Ruzek 37-yard field goal. Eagles 3–0.

Second quarter

- PHI – Roger Ruzek 28-yard field goal. Eagles 6–0.
- WAS – Art Monk 16-yard pass from Mark Rypien (Chip Lohmiller kick). Redskins 7–6.
- WAS – Chip Lohmiller 20-yard field goal. Redskins 10–6.

Third quarter

- WAS – Chip Lohmiller 19-yard field goal. Redskins 13–6.
- WAS – Gary Clark 2-yard pass from Mark Rypien (Chip Lohmiller kick). Redskins 20–6.

Fourth quarter

- No scoring plays.

Top passers

- WAS – Mark Rypien – 15/31, 206 yards, 2 TD, INT
- PHI – Randall Cunningham – 15/29, 205 yards, INT

Top rushers

- WAS – Earnest Byner – 18 rushes, 49 yards
- PHI – Randall Cunningham – 7 rushes, 80 yards

Top receivers

- WAS – Earnest Byner – 7 receptions, 77 yards
- PHI – Keith Jackson – 5 receptions, 116 yards

== Awards and honors ==
- Randall Cunningham, Bert Bell Award
