= Calvin Williams =

American football player (born 1967)

No. 89, 80
- Position: Wide receiver

Personal information
- Born: March 3, 1967 (age 59); Baltimore, Maryland, U.S.
- Listed height: 5 ft 11 in (1.80 m)
- Listed weight: 181 lb (82 kg)

Career information
- High school: Paul Laurence Dunbar (Baltimore, Maryland)
- College: Purdue
- NFL draft: 1990: 5th round, 133rd overall pick

Career history
- Philadelphia Eagles (1990–1995); Baltimore Ravens (1996); Philadelphia Eagles (1996)

Awards and highlights
- Football News' All-Rookie Team (1990)

Career NFL statistics
- Receptions: 308
- Receiving yards: 3,925
- Receiving touchdowns: 35
- Stats at Pro Football Reference

Calvin John Williams Jr. (born March 3, 1967) is an American former professional football player who played for seven seasons in the National Football League (NFL).

== Professional career ==
Williams was selected by the Philadelphia Eagles in the fifth round of the 1990 NFL draft. He was the third wide receiver the Eagles chose in the draft, behind Mike Bellamy and Fred Barnett. As a rookie in 1990, Williams earned the starting wide receiver spot alongside Mike Quick in training camp, which was previously held by Cris Carter. He went on to break the team's rookie touchdown reception record set by Bobby Walston in 1951 with nine. He made 37 catches for 602 yards and was named to Football News' All-Rookie Team.

Williams led the team in touchdown receptions in 1990 and 1992, and in 1993 he led the team with 10 touchdown catches, a career-high. In 1993, he caught 60 passes for 725 yards. In a game against the Washington Redskins on September 19, Williams caught eight passes for 181 yards and three touchdowns, including the winning score. He earned the NFC Offensive Player of the Week for his performance. In 1995 he led the team with 63 receptions, a career-high. In 1996 he also played with the Baltimore Ravens.

== NFL career statistics ==
Legend
**Bold**	Career high

=== Regular season ===
Year	Team	Games		Receiving				
Year	Team	GP	GS	Rec	Yds	Avg	Lng	TD
1990	PHI	**16**	14	37	602	**16.3**	45	9
1991	PHI	12	11	33	326	9.9	30	3
1992	PHI	**16**	**15**	42	598	14.2	49	7
1993	PHI	**16**	14	60	725	12.1	**80**	**10**
1994	PHI	**16**	14	58	**813**	14.0	53	3
1995	PHI	**16**	**15**	**63**	768	12.2	37	2
1996	BAL	7	2	13	85	6.5	19	1
1996	PHI	1	0	2	8	4.0	4	0
		100	85	308	3,925	12.7	80	35

=== Playoffs ===
Year	Team	Games		Receiving				
Year	Team	GP	GS	Rec	Yds	Avg	Lng	TD
1990	PHI	1	0	1	9	9.0	9	0
1992	PHI	**2**	**2**	**8**	**84**	10.5	18	**1**
1995	PHI	**2**	**2**	6	67	11.2	15	0
1996	PHI	1	0	2	40	**20.0**	**30**	0
		6	4	17	200	11.8	30	1

== After football ==
Williams was the athletic director and a physical education teacher at the Bluford Drew Jemison S.T.E.M. Academy. He became the assistant athletics director for Purdue University in 2011. Williams resides in West Lafayette, IN with his wife and their three children Jonah, Sydney and Rachel.
