= 1990 Dallas Cowboys season =

NFL team season

- Owner: Jerry Jones
- General manager: Jerry Jones and Jimmy Johnson
- Head coach: Jimmy Johnson
- Home stadium: Texas Stadium

Results
- Record: 7–9
- Division place: 4th NFC East
- Playoffs: Did not qualify
- Pro Bowlers: RB Emmitt Smith

The 1990 Dallas Cowboys season was the franchise's 31st season in the National Football League (NFL) and was the second year of the franchise under the ownership of Jerry Jones and head coach Jimmy Johnson. The Cowboys rebounded from a 1–15 season in 1989 to a 7–9 record. However, the Cowboys missed the playoffs for the fifth consecutive season. Despite this, Jimmy Johnson won AP's NFL coach of the year honors. This was the first season since their Super Bowl X-appearing 1975 season that offensive lineman Tom Rafferty was not on the roster, as he announced his retirement in the offseason, ending a 14-year era for the team.

== Summary ==
The season began with a win over San Diego, breaking a 14-game home losing streak. The Cowboys showed some early season fight with two wins over Tampa Bay and a near-miss against Philadelphia, but still stood only 3–7 after ten weeks, and were seemingly out of playoff contention. However, the team improved significantly in late November, winning four games in a row (including impressive wins over the Redskins and Saints, and a blowout win over the Cardinals). The Cowboys entered the season's final two weeks needing only one win or Saints' loss to make the playoffs as a wildcard. However, in week 16, quarterback Troy Aikman separated his shoulder early against the Eagles and was replaced by Babe Laufenberg (the Cowboys had traded backup Steve Walsh early in the season and Laufenberg was elevated from third string to backup). With Aikman injured, the Cowboys mustered little offense against the Eagles and lost, 17–3. Meanwhile, the Saints upset the 49ers (handing the Niners only their second loss) to keep the Cowboys from clinching in week 16. The next week, with Laufenberg again leading the offense, the Cowboys were thoroughly beaten, 26–7, by the 4–11 Atlanta Falcons. When the Saints beat the Rams the next night, the Cowboys were eliminated from playoff contention.

This season featured the debut of running back Emmitt Smith. Smith held out during training camp and was only a minimal contributor in the season's early games, but began to show his future greatness with a 100+ yard performance in a week-5 win against Tampa Bay and had a few other outstanding games during the season.

Because of the dismal 1–15 record from the previous season, the home opener against the San Diego Chargers was threatened to be blacked out for the local television market, since Texas Stadium was not sold out. A local radio station ended up buying all of the unsold tickets so that the game could be broadcast to the local DFW market.

== Offseason ==
=== NFL draft ===
1990 Dallas Cowboys draft
Round	Pick	Player	Position	College	Notes
1	17	Emmitt Smith * ^{†}	RB	Florida	
2	26	Alexander Wright	WR	Auburn	
3	64	Jimmie Jones	DT	Miami (FL)	
9	221	Kenneth Gant	S	Albany State	
11	277	Dave Harper	LB	Humboldt State	
Made roster † Pro Football Hall of Fame * Made at least one Pro Bowl during career

=== Undrafted free agents ===
1990 undrafted free agents of note
Player	Position	College
Tom Huebner	Guard	Pittsburgh
Fred McNair	Quarterback	Alcorn State
Curt Mull	Tackle	Georgia
Mark Warner	Tackle	Canisius
Ken Willis	Kicker	Kentucky

== Staff ==
1990 Dallas Cowboys staff
Ownership Owner/General Manager – Jerry Jones Front office: Director of Player Personnel – Bob Ackles; Director of College Scouting – Dick Mansperger; Direct or Pro Personnel – John Wooten; Scouts – Jim Garrett, Walter Juliff, Ron Marciniak, Jeff Smith, and Walt Yowarsky; Head coaches Head Coach – Jimmy Johnson Offensive coaches: Offensive Coordinator– David Shula; Receivers – Hubbard Alexander; Running Backs – Joe Brodsky; Tight Ends – Alan Lowry; Offensive Line – Tony Wise	Defensive coaches: Defensive Coordinator/Linebackers – Dave Wannstedt; Defensive Backs – Dave Campo and Dick Nolan; Defensive Line – Butch Davis; Defensive Assistant – Ron Meeks; Special teams coaches: Special Teams – Joe Avezzano; Kickers/Quality Control – Steve Hoffman; Strength and conditioning: Strength and Conditioning – Steve Woicik; Trainer – Kevin O'Neill

== Roster ==
Dallas Cowboys 1990 roster
Quarterbacks: 15 Babe Laufenberg; 18 Cliff Stoudt; Running backs: 34 Tommie Agee FB; 48 Daryl Johnston FB; 39 Bob Perryman; 22 Emmitt Smith; Wide receivers: 86 James Dixon KR; 88 Michael Irvin; 83 Kelvin Martin PR; 87 Derrick Shepard PR; 81 Alexander Wright KR; Tight ends: 89 Rob Awalt; 85 Steve Folsom; 84 Jay Novacek	Offensive linemen: 67 John Gesek G; 66 Kevin Gogan T/G; 68 Crawford Ker G; 61 Nate Newton T; 53 Mark Stepnoski C; 71 Mark Tuinei T; 76 Jeff Zimmerman G; Defensive linemen: 78 Dean Hamel DT; 77 Jim Jeffcoat DE; 97 Jimmie Jones DT; 73 Danny Noonan DT; 96 Danny Stubbs DE; 92 Tony Tolbert DE	Linebackers: 90 Willis Crockett MLB; 55 Jack Del Rio OLB; 50 Dave Harper OLB; 99 David Howard OLB; 56 Eugene Lockhart MLB; 57 Vinson Smith OLB; 54 Jesse Solomon MLB; Defensive backs: 40 Bill Bates SS; 44 Michael Brooks CB/S; 38 Ron Francis CB; 29 Kenneth Gant CB; 45 Manny Hendrix CB; 30 Issiac Holt CB; 20 Ray Horton FS; 37 James Washington SS; 23 Robert Williams CB; Special teams: 70 Dale Hellestrae LS; 4 Mike Saxon P; 1 Ken Willis K	Reserve lists: 8 Troy Aikman QB (IR); 36 Vince Albritton S (IR); 31 Scott Ankrom S (IR); 79 Willie Broughton DT (IR); -- Chad Hennings DT (Military Reserve); 32 Alonzo Highsmith FB (IR); -- Steve Johnson TE (IR); 26 Keith Jones RB (IR); 51 Ken Norton Jr. LB (IR); 42 Stan Smagala CB/S (IR); Practice squad: -- Rich Gicewicz TE; -- Reginald Warnsley FB; -- Mike Williams WR; Rookies in italics 46 active, 10 inactive, 3 practice squad

== Regular season ==
=== Schedule ===
Week	Date	Opponent	Result	Record	Venue	Attendance
1	September 9	San Diego Chargers	**W** 17–14	1–0	Texas Stadium	48,063
2	September 16	**New York Giants**	**L** 7–28	1–1	Texas Stadium	61,090
3	September 23	at **Washington Redskins**	**L** 15–19	1–2	Robert F. Kennedy Memorial Stadium	53,804
4	September 30	at **New York Giants**	**L** 17–31	1–3	Giants Stadium	75,923
5	October 7	Tampa Bay Buccaneers	**W** 14–10	2–3	Texas Stadium	60,076
6	October 14	at **Phoenix Cardinals**	**L** 3–20	2–4	Sun Devil Stadium	45,235
7	October 21	at Tampa Bay Buccaneers	**W** 17–13	3–4	Tampa Stadium	68,315
8	October 28	**Philadelphia Eagles**	**L** 20–21	3–5	Texas Stadium	62,605
9	November 4	at New York Jets	**L** 9–24	3–6	Giants Stadium	68,086
10	November 11	San Francisco 49ers	**L** 6–24	3–7	Texas Stadium	62,966
11	November 18	at Los Angeles Rams	**W** 24–21	4–7	Anaheim Stadium	58,589
12	November 22	**Washington Redskins**	**W** 27–17	5–7	Texas Stadium	60,355
13	December 2	New Orleans Saints	**W** 17–13	6–7	Texas Stadium	60,087
14	Bye					
15	December 16	**Phoenix Cardinals**	**W** 41–10	7–7	Texas Stadium	60,190
16	December 23	at **Philadelphia Eagles**	**L** 3–17	7–8	Veterans Stadium	63,895
17	December 30	at Atlanta Falcons	**L** 7–26	7–9	Atlanta–Fulton County Stadium	50,097

Note: Intra-division opponents are in bold text.

=== Standings ===
NFC East
	W	L	T	PCT	DIV	CONF	PF	PA	STK
^{(2)} New York Giants	13	3	0	.813	7–1	10–2	335	211	W2
^{(4)} Philadelphia Eagles	10	6	0	.625	5–3	9–3	396	299	W3
^{(5)} Washington Redskins	10	6	0	.625	4–4	7–5	381	301	W1
Dallas Cowboys	7	9	0	.438	2–6	6–8	244	308	L2
Phoenix Cardinals	5	11	0	.313	2–6	3–9	268	396	L3

== Season summary ==
=== Week 1: vs San Diego Chargers ===
Week One: San Diego Chargers at Dallas Cowboys – Game summary

Quarter	1	2	3	4	Total
Chargers	7	7	0	0	14
Cowboys	7	0	0	10	17

at Texas Stadium, Irving, Texas

- Date: September 9
- Game time: 3:00 p.m. CDT
- Game weather: 76 °F (24.4 °C), relative humidity 87%, wind 6 mph
- Game attendance: 48,063
- Referee: Jim Tunney
- TV announcers (NBC): Fred Roggin and Jim Laslavic
- Box score

Game information

First quarter

- DAL – Dennis McKinnon 28-yard pass from Troy Aikman (Ken Willis kick), 10:32. Cowboys 7–0. Drive: 8 plays, 84 yards, 4:28.
- SDG – Craig McEwen 14-yard pass from Mark Vlasic (Fuad Reveiz kick), 4:30. Tied 7–7. Drive: 11 plays, 62 yards, 6:02.

Second quarter

- SDG – Marion Butts 1-yard run (Fuad Reveiz kick), 5:43. Chargers 14–7. Drive: 2 plays, 49 yards, 0:55.

Third quarter

- No scoring plays.

Fourth quarter

- DAL – Ken Willis 31-yard field goal, 11:26. Chargers 14–10. Drive: 8 plays, 36 yards, 4:53.
- DAL – Troy Aikman 1-yard run (Ken Willis kick), 1:58. Cowboys 17–14. Drive: 8 plays, 49 yards, 3:17.

Top passers

- SDG – Mark Vlasic – 17/31, 137 yards, TD, INT
- DAL – Troy Aikman – 13/29, 193 yards, TD, INT

Top rushers

- SDG – Marion Butts – 16 rushes, 61 yards, TD
- DAL – Tommie Agee – 13 rushes, 59 yards

Top receivers

- SDG – Anthony Miller – 4 receptions, 44 yards
- DAL – Kelvin Martin – 5 receptions, 78 yards

=== Porkchop Bowl ===
Porkchop Bowl
Philadelphia Eagles (2–4)	Dallas Cowboys (3–4)
21	20
Head coach: Buddy Ryan	Head coach: Jimmy Johnson
	1	2	3	4	Total
PHI	7	0	0	14	21
DAL	0	3	3	14	20
- Date: October 28, 1990
- Stadium: Texas Stadium; Irving, Texas
- Referee: Howard Roe

TV in the United States
- Network: CBS
- Announcers: Tim Ryan and Irv Cross

The Porkchop Bowl was the NFL matchup between the Philadelphia Eagles and Dallas Cowboys which followed the Bounty Bowl II.

The week before game day in Dallas, Philadelphia head coach Buddy Ryan and offensive coordinator Ted Plumb went out for dinner. Ryan was dining on pork chops and started to choke. Plumb quickly initiated the Heimlich maneuver and saved Ryan's life. Word of the incident spread in Dallas, and Cowboys' president Tex Schramm dubbed the pending game on October 28 the "Porkchop Bowl." The final score was 21–20 in favor of the Eagles.

== Transactions ==
- On September 25, 1990, the Dallas Cowboys traded Steve Walsh to the New Orleans Saints for the Saints' first and third-round picks in the 1991 NFL draft and a second-round pick (that could become a first-round pick based on performance) in the 1992 NFL draft.

== Awards and records ==
- Jimmy Johnson, National Football League Coach of the Year Award
- Emmitt Smith, National Football League Rookie of the Year Award

== Publications ==
- The Football Encyclopedia ISBN 0-312-11435-4
- Total Football ISBN 0-06-270170-3
- Cowboys Have Always Been My Heroes ISBN 0-446-51950-2
