= Byron Evans =

American football player (born 1964)

No. 56
- Position: Linebacker

Personal information
- Born: February 23, 1964 (age 62); Phoenix, Arizona, U.S.
- Listed height: 6 ft 2 in (1.88 m)
- Listed weight: 235 lb (107 kg)

Career information
- High school: South Mountain (Phoenix)
- College: Arizona
- NFL draft: 1987: 4th round, 93rd overall pick

Career history
- Philadelphia Eagles (1987–1994)

Awards and highlights
- NFL combined tackles leader (1989); Second-team All-American (1986); Pac-10 Defensive Player of the Year (1986); 2× First-team All-Pac-10 (1985, 1986)

Career NFL statistics
- Total tackles: 819
- Sacks: 3.5
- Forced fumbles: 4
- Fumble recoveries: 12
- Interceptions: 13
- Touchdowns: 2
- Stats at Pro Football Reference

Byron Nelson Evans (born February 23, 1964) is an American former professional football player who was a linebacker in the National Football League (NFL). He was a mainstay of the Philadelphia Eagles defense of the late 1980s and early 1990s.

Evans was born and raised in Phoenix, Arizona and played scholastically at South Mountain High School. He played college football at the University of Arizona, where he was honored by the Associated Press as a second-team All-American.

== Professional career ==
Pre-draft measurables
Height	Weight	Arm length	Hand span	40-yard dash	10-yard split	20-yard split	20-yard shuttle	Vertical jump	Broad jump	Bench press
6 ft 2 in (1.88 m)	220 lb (100 kg)	32 3/4 in (0.83 m)	9 1/2 in (0.24 m)	4.79 s	1.64 s	2.76 s	4.48 s	29.5 in (0.75 m)	9 ft 9 in (2.97 m)	17 reps
All values from NFL Combine

Evans was selected by the Eagles in the fourth-round of the 1987 NFL draft.

Evans was the middle linebacker and a leader of the "Gang Green" defense of the Philadelphia Eagles from 1989 to 1992. In 1991, the Eagles defense achieved the rare feat of being No. 1 against the run and the pass, earning it recognition as one of the best defenses in NFL history. The defense included perennial All-Pros Reggie White, Jerome Brown (until his death in an automobile accident in 1992), Seth Joyner, Clyde Simmons, and Eric Allen, along with bruising safeties Andre Waters and Wes Hopkins. Gang Green was built on coach Buddy Ryan's 46 defense and perfected by defensive coordinator Bud Carson after the Eagles fired Ryan in 1990. To illustrate Byron Evans' importance, he played the Mike Singletary role in Ryan's 46 defense, serving as the de facto quarterback of the defense. The Eagles were 7-2 when Evans sustained a career-ending leg injury on November 13, 1994, a victim of the infamous Veterans Stadium turf. The team then lost 7 straight games, finishing the season 7–9. Despite several pro-bowl caliber years, particularly in 1989 when he had 184 tackles, 3 interceptions, and 3 fumble recoveries, Evans never received the same level of personal acclaim as his teammates. However his role as leader of the defense was solidified when he was named defensive captain in 1989, and Philadelphia reveres Evans as one of the best linebackers in Eagles history.

== NFL career statistics ==
Legend
	Led the league
**Bold**	Career high

Year	Team	Games		Tackles				Interceptions				Fumbles			
Year	Team	GP	GS	Comb	Solo	Ast	Sck	Int	Yds	TD	Lng	FF	FR	Yds	TD
1987	PHI	12	3	25	—	—	0.0	1	12	0	12	0	1	0	0
1988	PHI	**16**	5	47	—	—	0.0	0	0	0	0	0	2	0	0
1989	PHI	**16**	**16**	**184**	—	—	**2.0**	3	23	0	15	0	**3**	21	0
1990	PHI	**16**	**16**	112	—	—	1.0	1	43	**1**	22	0	0	0	0
1991	PHI	**16**	15	111	—	—	0.0	2	46	0	31	0	2	0	0
1992	PHI	**16**	**16**	175	—	—	0.0	**4**	**76**	0	**43**	0	0	0	0
1993	PHI	11	10	109	—	—	0.0	1	8	0	7	**3**	**3**	**30**	**1**
1994	PHI	10	10	56	**43**	**13**	0.5	1	6	0	6	1	1	0	0
		113	91	819	43	13	3.5	13	214	1	43	4	12	51	1

== Personal life ==
He has three children.
