= 1990 Washington Redskins season =

National Football League team season

- Owner: Jack Kent Cooke
- General manager: Charley Casserly
- President: John Kent Cooke
- Head coach: Joe Gibbs
- Offensive coordinator: Joe Gibbs
- Defensive coordinator: Richie Petitbon
- Home stadium: RFK Stadium

Results
- Record: 10–6
- Division place: 3rd NFC East
- Playoffs: Won Wild Card Playoffs (at Eagles) 20–6; Lost Divisional Playoffs (at 49ers) 10–28
- All-Pros: 2: OT Jim Lachey (1st team); CB Darrell Green (2nd team)
- Pro Bowlers: 4: RB Earnest Byner; WR Gary Clark; OT Jim Lachey; CB Darrell Green

The 1990 season was the Washington Redskins' 59th in the National Football League, their 54th representing Washington, D.C., and the tenth under head coach Joe Gibbs. The team matched on their 10–6 record from 1989, this time it was enough to earn them' their first playoff appearance since 1987. The Redskins' season ended when they fell to the two-time defending Super Bowl champion San Francisco 49ers 28–10 in the divisional round of the playoffs.

== Offseason ==
=== NFL draft ===
1990 Washington Redskins draft
| Round | Pick | Player | Position | College | Notes |
| 2 | 46 | Andre Collins | Linebacker | Penn State | |
| 3 | 77 | Mo Elewonibi | Offensive tackle | BYU | |
| 4 | 86 | Cary Conklin | Quarterback | Washington | |
| 4 | 106 | Rico Labbe | Cornerback | Boston College | |
| 5 | 130 | Brian Mitchell * | Running back | Northeast Louisiana | |
| 6 | 160 | Kent Wells | Defensive tackle | Nebraska | |
| 9 | 243 | Tim Moxley | Guard | Ohio State | |
| 10 | 262 | D'Juan Francisco | Cornerback | Notre Dame | |
| 10 | 270 | Thomas Rayam | Guard | Alabama | |
| 11 | 297 | Jon Leverenz | Linebacker | Minnesota | |
Made roster * Made at least one Pro Bowl during career

=== Undrafted free agents ===
1990 undrafted free agents of note
| Player | Position | College |
|---|---|---|
| Tim Adams | Defensive tackle | BYU |
| Dan Crossman | Defensive back | Pittsburgh |
| Jay Fagan | Guard | Montana |
| Byron Forsythe | Center | Houston |
| Doug Glaser | Tackle | Nebraska |
| George Searcy | Running back | East Tennessee State |
| Paul Smith | Wide receiver | Houston |
| Larry Viadic | Cornerback | Oregon State |
| Percy Waddie | Wide receiver | Texas A&M |

== Roster ==
1990 Washington Redskins roster
| Quarterbacks (QB): 14 Gary Hogeboom; 10 Jeff Rutledge; 11 Mark Rypien; Running backs (RB): 21 Earnest Byner; 25 Reggie Dupard; 30 Brian Mitchell; 37 Gerald Riggs; Wide receivers (WR): 84 Gary Clark; 86 Stephen Hobbs; 80 Joe Howard; 81 Art Monk; 83 Ricky Sanders; Tight ends (TE): 88 Jimmie Johnson; 86 Ron Middleton; 85 Don Warren; 48 Ken Whisenhunt | Offensive linemen (OL): 61 Mark Adickes G; 53 Jeff Bostic C; 68 Russ Grimm G; 66 Joe Jacoby T; 79 Jim Lachey T; 63 Raleigh McKenzie G; 69 Mark Schlereth G; Defensive linemen (DL): 97 Jumpy Geathers DE; 77 Darryl Grant DT; 78 Tim Johnson DT; 74 Markus Koch DE; 71 Charles Mann DE; 99 Tracy Rocker DT; 60 Fred Stokes DE; 76 Eric Williams DT | Linebackers (LB): 50 Ravin Caldwell OLB; 51 Monte Coleman OLB; 55 Andre Collins OLB; 54 Kurt Gouveia MLB; 91 Greg Manusky MLB; 58 Wilber Marshall OLB; Defensive backs (DB): 23 Todd Bowles FS; 27 Brad Edwards FS; 28 Darrell Green CB; 47 A. J. Johnson CB; 35 Martin Mayhew CB; 20 Alvoid Mays CB; 40 Alvin Walton SS; Special teams (ST): 82 John Brandes LS; 2 Kelly Goodburn P; 8 Chip Lohmiller K | Practice squad: 90 Carl Harry WR; Reserve: 67 Ray Brown G/T (IR); 24 Kelvin Bryant RB (IR); 12 Cary Conklin QB (IR); 64 Mo Elewonibi G (IR); 16 Stan Humphries QB (IR); 98 Jon Leverenz LB (IR); 73 Mark May G (PUP); 76 Ed Simmons T (IR); 89 Walter Stanley WR (IR); 31 Clarence Vaughn S (IR); 47 active, 10 inactive, 1 practice squad Rookies in italics |

== Regular season ==
=== Schedule ===
| Week | Date | Opponent | Result | Record | Venue | Attendance | Recap |
|---|---|---|---|---|---|---|---|
| 1 | September 9 | **Phoenix Cardinals** | **W** 31–0 | 1–0 | RFK Stadium | 52,649 | Recap |
| 2 | September 16 | at San Francisco 49ers | **L** 13–26 | 1–1 | Candlestick Park | 64,287 | Recap |
| 3 | September 23 | **Dallas Cowboys** | **W** 19–15 | 2–1 | RFK Stadium | 53,804 | Recap |
| 4 | September 30 | at **Phoenix Cardinals** | **W** 38–10 | 3–1 | Sun Devil Stadium | 49,303 | Recap |
| 5 | Bye | | | | | | |
| 6 | October 14 | **New York Giants** | **L** 20–24 | 3–2 | RFK Stadium | 54,737 | Recap |
| 7 | October 21 | **Philadelphia Eagles** | **W** 13–7 | 4–2 | RFK Stadium | 53,567 | Recap |
| 8 | October 28 | at **New York Giants** | **L** 10–21 | 4–3 | Giants Stadium | 75,321 | Recap |
| 9 | November 4 | at Detroit Lions | **W** 41–38 (OT) | 5–3 | Pontiac Silverdome | 69,326 | Recap |
| 10 | November 12 | at **Philadelphia Eagles** | **L** 14–28 | 5–4 | Veterans Stadium | 65,857 | Recap |
| 11 | November 18 | New Orleans Saints | **W** 31–17 | 6–4 | RFK Stadium | 52,573 | Recap |
| 12 | November 22 | at **Dallas Cowboys** | **L** 17–27 | 6–5 | Texas Stadium | 60,355 | Recap |
| 13 | December 2 | Miami Dolphins | **W** 42–20 | 7–5 | RFK Stadium | 53,599 | Recap |
| 14 | December 9 | Chicago Bears | **W** 10–9 | 8–5 | RFK Stadium | 53,920 | Recap |
| 15 | December 15 | at New England Patriots | **W** 25–10 | 9–5 | Foxboro Stadium | 22,286 | Recap |
| 16 | December 22 | at Indianapolis Colts | **L** 28–35 | 9–6 | RCA Dome | 58,173 | Recap |
| 17 | December 30 | Buffalo Bills | **W** 29–14 | 10–6 | RFK Stadium | 52,397 | Recap |

Note: Intra-division opponents are in bold text.

=== Standings ===
NFC East
| | W | L | T | PCT | DIV | CONF | PF | PA | STK |
|---|---|---|---|---|---|---|---|---|---|
| ^{(2)} New York Giants | 13 | 3 | 0 | .813 | 7–1 | 10–2 | 335 | 211 | W2 |
| ^{(4)} Philadelphia Eagles | 10 | 6 | 0 | .625 | 5–3 | 9–3 | 396 | 299 | W3 |
| ^{(5)} Washington Redskins | 10 | 6 | 0 | .625 | 4–4 | 7–5 | 381 | 301 | W1 |
| Dallas Cowboys | 7 | 9 | 0 | .438 | 2–6 | 6–8 | 244 | 308 | L2 |
| Phoenix Cardinals | 5 | 11 | 0 | .313 | 2–6 | 3–9 | 268 | 396 | L3 |

== Playoffs ==
| Round | Date | Opponent (seed) | Result | Venue | Attendance | Game recap |
|---|---|---|---|---|---|---|
| Wildcard | January 5, 1991 | at Philadelphia Eagles (4) | W 20–6 | Veterans Stadium | 65,287 | Recap |
| Divisional | January 12, 1991 | at San Francisco 49ers (1) | L 10–28 | Candlestick Park | 65,292 | Recap |
