= Fred Barnett =

American football player and coach (born 1966)

No. 86, 80
- Position: Wide receiver

Personal information
- Born: June 17, 1966 (age 60); Shelby, Mississippi, U.S.
- Listed height: 6 ft 0 in (1.83 m)
- Listed weight: 203 lb (92 kg)

Career information
- High school: Rosedale (MS)
- College: Arkansas State
- NFL draft: 1990: 3rd round, 77th overall pick

Career history

Playing
- Philadelphia Eagles (1990–1995); Miami Dolphins (1996–1997)

Coaching
- Memphis Maniax (2001) Tight ends coach

Awards and highlights
- Pro Bowl (1992); PFWA All-Rookie Team (1990)

Career NFL statistics
- Receptions: 361
- Receiving yards: 5,362
- Receiving touchdowns: 32
- Stats at Pro Football Reference

Fred “Arkansas” Lee Barnett (born June 17, 1966) is an American former professional football player who was a wide receiver in the National Football League (NFL) for the Philadelphia Eagles and Miami Dolphins. He played college football at Arkansas State University and was selected by the Eagles in the third round of the 1990 NFL draft.

Barnett played in eight NFL seasons from 1990 to 1997 for the Eagles and the Dolphins. He made the Pro Bowl following the 1992 season and was known for his ability to make acrobatic catches. He was the receiver on one of the Eagles' longest plays of all time, a 95-yard touchdown pass from Randall Cunningham in a 1990 game against the Buffalo Bills. Barnett was later the tight ends coach of the Memphis Maniax of the XFL.

Barnett's cousin Tim Barnett was drafted the next year, with the same pick (3rd round, pick 77) as Fred, and played the same position, WR, with the Kansas City Chiefs.

== NFL career statistics ==
Legend
	Led the league
**Bold**	Career high

Year	Team	Games		Receiving				
Year	Team	GP	GS	Rec	Yds	Avg	Lng	TD
1990	PHI	**16**	11	36	721	**20.0**	**95**	**8**
1991	PHI	15	15	62	948	15.3	75	4
1992	PHI	**16**	**16**	67	1,083	16.2	71	6
1993	PHI	4	4	17	170	10.0	21	0
1994	PHI	**16**	**16**	**78**	**1,127**	14.4	54	5
1995	PHI	14	14	48	585	12.2	33	5
1996	MIA	9	7	36	562	15.6	66	3
1997	MIA	6	5	17	166	9.8	20	1
Career		96	88	361	5,362	14.9	95	32
