= Heath Sherman =

American football player (born 1967)

No. 23
- Position: Running back

Personal information
- Born: March 27, 1967 (age 59); Wharton, Texas, U.S.
- Listed height: 6 ft 0 in (1.83 m)
- Listed weight: 195 lb (88 kg)

Career information
- High school: El Campo (El Campo, Texas)
- College: Texas A&I
- NFL draft: 1989: 6th round, 162nd overall pick

Career history
- Philadelphia Eagles (1989–1993); San Antonio Texans (1995)

Career NFL statistics
- Rushing yards: 2,130
- Rushing average: 4
- Rushing touchdowns: 10
- Stats at Pro Football Reference

Heath B. Sherman (born March 27, 1967) is an American former professional football player who was a running back in the National Football League (NFL) for five seasons with the Philadelphia Eagles. He played college football for the Texas A&I Javelinas and was selected in the sixth round of the 1989 NFL draft.

== NFL career statistics ==
Legend
	Led the league
**Bold**	Career high

=== Regular season ===
Year	Team	Games		Rushing					Receiving				
Year	Team	GP	GS	Att	Yds	Avg	Lng	TD	Rec	Yds	Avg	Lng	TD
1989	PHI	15	1	40	177	4.4	**37**	2	8	85	10.6	17	0
1990	PHI	14	6	**164**	**685**	4.2	36	1	**23**	167	7.3	26	**3**
1991	PHI	**16**	5	106	279	2.6	12	0	14	59	4.2	11	0
1992	PHI	**16**	**7**	112	583	**5.2**	34	**5**	18	**219**	**12.2**	**75**	1
1993	PHI	15	**7**	115	406	3.5	19	2	12	78	6.5	21	0
		76	26	537	2,130	4.0	37	10	75	608	8.1	75	4

=== Playoffs ===
Year	Team	Games		Rushing					Receiving				
Year	Team	GP	GS	Att	Yds	Avg	Lng	TD	Rec	Yds	Avg	Lng	TD
1989	PHI	1	1	9	44	**4.9**	**23**	0	2	18	9.0	11	0
1990	PHI	1	1	17	53	3.1	**23**	0	2	15	7.5	10	0
1992	PHI	**2**	**2**	**27**	**117**	4.3	16	**1**	**3**	**29**	**9.7**	**16**	0
		4	4	53	214	4.0	23	1	7	62	8.9	16	0
