= William Frizzell =

American football player (born 1962)

No. 26, 33
- Position: Defensive back

Personal information
- Born: September 8, 1962 (age 64); Greenville, North Carolina, U.S.
- Listed height: 6 ft 3 in (1.91 m)
- Listed weight: 203 lb (92 kg)

Career information
- High school: J.H. Rose (Greenville)
- College: North Carolina Central
- NFL draft: 1984: 10th round, 259th overall pick

Career history
- Detroit Lions (1984–1985); Philadelphia Eagles (1986–1990); Tampa Bay Buccaneers (1991); Philadelphia Eagles (1992–1993)

Career NFL statistics
- Interceptions: 11
- Fumble recoveries: 4
- Sacks: 4
- Stats at Pro Football Reference

William Jasper Frizzell (born September 8, 1962) is an American former professional football player who was a cornerback in the National Football League (NFL) for the Detroit Lions, Philadelphia Eagles, and Tampa Bay Buccaneers from 1984 to 1993. He played college football for the North Carolina Central Eagles and was selected in the tenth round of the 1984 NFL draft.
