= Mark Rypien =

American football player (born 1962)

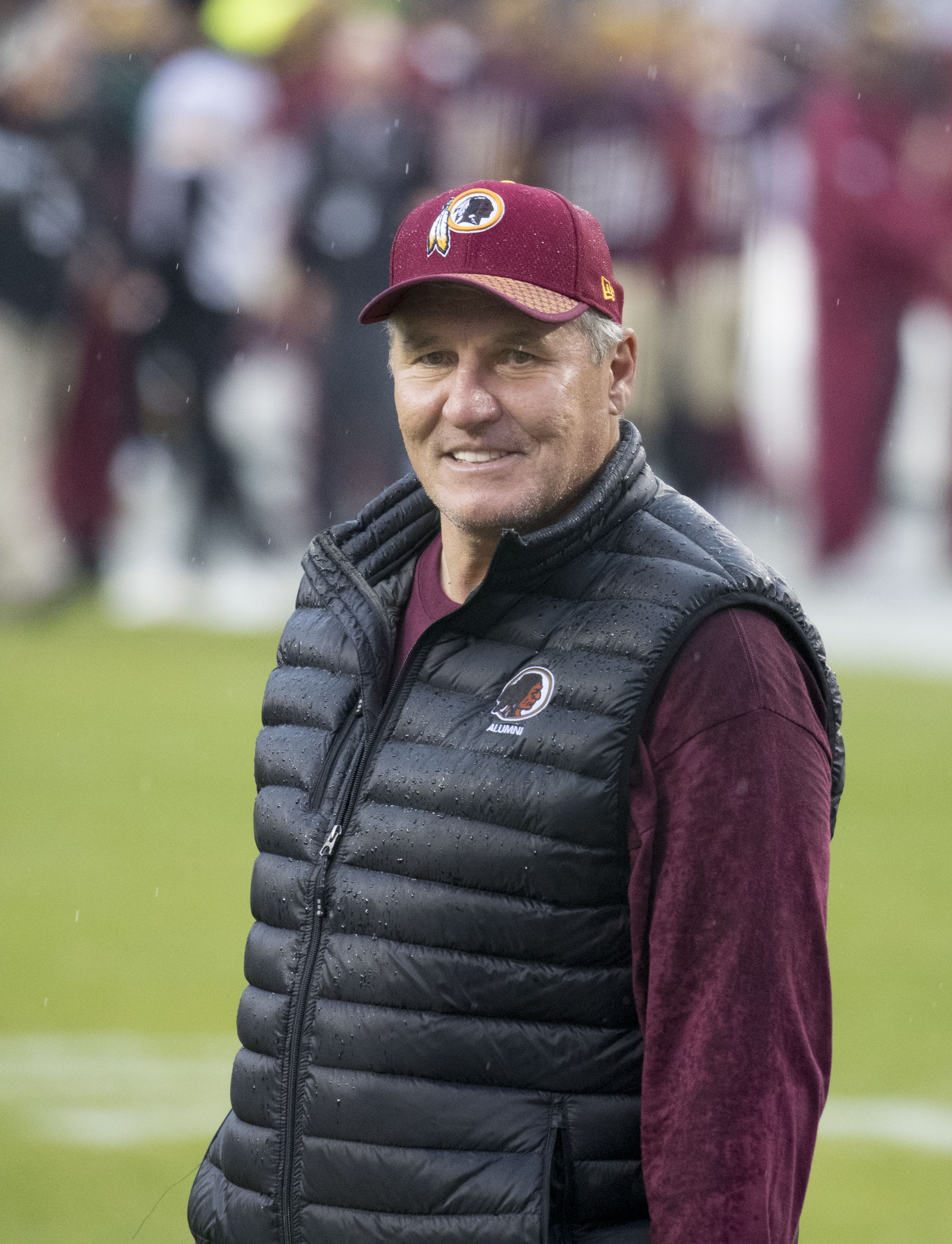
- Rypien in 2017

No. 11, 16
- Position: Quarterback

Personal information
- Born: October 2, 1962 (age 64); Calgary, Alberta, Canada
- Listed height: 6 ft 4 in (1.93 m)
- Listed weight: 225 lb (102 kg)

Career information
- High school: Shadle Park (Spokane, Washington, U.S.)
- College: Washington State (1981–1985)
- NFL draft: 1986: 6th round, 146th overall pick

Career history
- Washington Redskins (1986–1993); Cleveland Browns (1994); St. Louis Rams (1995); Philadelphia Eagles (1996); St. Louis Rams (1997); Atlanta Falcons (1998)*; Indianapolis Colts (2001); Seattle Seahawks (2002)*; Rochester Raiders (2006)
- * Offseason or practice squad member only

Awards and highlights
- 2× Super Bowl champion (XXII, XXVI); Super Bowl MVP (XXVI); Second-team All-Pro (1991); 2× Pro Bowl (1989, 1991); Washington Redskins 90 Greatest; First-team All-Pac-10 (1984)

Career NFL statistics
- Passing attempts: 2,613
- Passing completions: 1,466
- Completion percentage: 56.1%
- TD–INT: 115–88
- Passing yards: 18,473
- Passer rating: 78.9
- Stats at Pro Football Reference

Mark Robert Rypien (born October 2, 1962) is a former professional football quarterback who played in the National Football League (NFL) for 14 seasons. He played college football for the Washington State Cougars and was selected by the Washington Redskins in the sixth round of the 1986 NFL draft. He was named Super Bowl MVP, doing so in Super Bowl XXVI with the Redskins. He also played for several other NFL teams. His nephew Brett plays in the NFL as a quarterback.

== Early life ==
Born in Calgary, Alberta, on October 2, 1962, Rypien's family moved to the United States when he was three, settling in Spokane, Washington. He was a star three-sport athlete at Shadle Park High School. All three of his varsity numbers (football, basketball, and baseball) were later retired by the school.

He earned Parade All-American honors as a high school senior and received scholarship offers from across the country before accepting a football scholarship to Washington State University in Pullman, and joined the Delta Tau Delta fraternity. A knee injury in spring drills in 1982 redshirted him for that season and he nearly left football and WSU in November 1983 but stayed and earned first-team All-Pac-10 honors in 1984 and led WSU's fabled RPM offense in 1985. He was inducted into WSU's Athletics Hall of Fame in 1993. He played in the 1986 Senior Bowl.

== Professional career ==
=== Washington Redskins ===
Rypien was selected by the Washington Redskins in the sixth round (146th overall) of the 1986 NFL draft. He spent his first two years as a professional on the injured reserved list, first with a bad knee in 1986, then a bad back in 1987. He watched from the sidelines as the Redskins won Super Bowl XXII under coach Joe Gibbs in January 1988 behind the quarterbacking of veteran Doug Williams.

Rypien became the second stringer after Jay Schroeder, who lost his job to Williams late in the 1987 season, was traded to the Los Angeles Raiders. In Week 4 against the newly relocated Phoenix Cardinals, Rypien got his first chance to start for an injured Williams and threw for 303 yards and two touchdowns in a 30–21 loss. In six starts, he went 3–3 and he appeared in nine games overall, including a four-touchdown game in a rematch against the Cardinals. He threw for 1,730 yards in those games and finished with three more touchdowns than Williams had, by a count of 18–15.

Rypien was named the starter for 1989 ahead of the injured and aging Williams. Rypien emerged as a star quarterback as he threw for 3,768 yards and 22 touchdowns, leading the Redskins to a 10–6 record. The team missed the playoffs but Rypien received a bid as an injury replacement for Joe Montana and Don Majkowski in that year's Pro Bowl (NFC coach John Robinson elected to bring only one injury replacement for his intended starter and #2 quarterback).

Rypien was best known for his phenomenal accuracy as a deep passer. He made the Pro Bowl in his first full season as a starter, doing so as an injury replacement.

The 1991 season was Rypien's best: he threw for 3,564 yards, 28 touchdowns, and 11 interceptions, leading the Redskins to Super Bowl XXVI after recording a 14–2 regular season record. He was named the MVP (Most Valuable Player) of the game, passing for 292 yards and 2 touchdowns and leading his team to a 37–24 win over the Buffalo Bills. Rypien, a native of Calgary, Alberta, Canada, became the first foreign-born player to earn the honor. Rypien was named to the Pro Bowl in both 1989 and 1991.

Rypien was one of several players to benefit from the team's success following their championship season. The Redskins signed him to a 3-year, $9 million deal entering the 1992 season. However, the team battled age and injuries and finished the regular season with a 9–7 record, barely making the playoffs. His passing yardage was a respectable 3,282 yards, but his passer rating fell from 97.9 in 1991 to 71.7 in 1992 and his interceptions outnumbered his touchdowns 17–13. Although a dominant team performance in the playoffs brought victory over the Minnesota Vikings in an NFC Wild Card away game, the Redskins eventually lost on a rainy, muddy field in a bruising game against the San Francisco 49ers, and the Rypien era was essentially over. Under new head coach Richie Petitbon, Rypien had his best training camp in 1993 and expectations were high following a Monday Night win over the defending Super Bowl Champion Dallas Cowboys. However, Rypien injured his knee in Week 2 against the Arizona Cardinals and the team began a precipitous slide toward a 4–12 season finish.

When he was healthy enough to return, Rypien performed spot duty, sharing time with the newly acquired Rich Gannon. The Redskins hired Norv Turner as their head coach in 1994. Rypien participated in offseason workouts, but the team later released him.

=== Cleveland Browns ===
On May 11, 1994, Rypien signed with the Cleveland Browns to backup Vinny Testaverde. He played in six games for the Browns that year, starting three of them. In those three games he went 2–1, including a 26–7 win over the Eagles.

=== St. Louis Rams (first stint) ===
On May 6, 1995, Rypien signed with the St. Louis Rams, this time to backup Chris Miller. He started the final three games of the season, going 0–3 in that span to finish a disappointing season for the team. He had his best performance against the Buffalo Bills in his first start where he went 31 of 55 for 372 yards and two touchdowns despite the team's 45–27 loss to Jim Kelly.

=== Philadelphia Eagles ===
On October 3, 1996, Rypien signed with the Philadelphia Eagles due to an injury to starter Rodney Peete. His last NFL touchdown pass came in relief of Eagles quarterback Ty Detmer, an 8-yarder to Irving Fryar with five seconds remaining in a 37–10 loss to the Indianapolis Colts.

=== St. Louis Rams (second stint) ===
On March 4, 1997, Rypien re-signed with the Rams. He played in five games and did not score any touchdowns.

=== Atlanta Falcons ===
He signed with the Atlanta Falcons for the 1998 season but never played in Atlanta. His son's death from a malignant brain tumor that August caused Rypien to retire.

=== Indianapolis Colts ===
After a three-year hiatus, Rypien unretired and signed with the Indianapolis Colts on August 1, 2001. He would appear in four games for the Colts. He made his first appearance in week three against the New England Patriots in relief of Peyton Manning. He would attempt his only passes of the season that game going five of nine for 57 yards in the 44–13 loss.

=== Seattle Seahawks ===
On August 19, 2002, Rypien signed with the Seattle Seahawks to be the backup for Matt Hasselbeck and Trent Dilfer. He played in two preseason games and finished 13 of 21 passing for 97 yards, but was ultimately cut on September 3, 2002.

=== Rochester Raiders ===
Rypien's last professional game was on June 10, 2006; as part of a promotional gig for the Rochester Raiders of the Great Lakes Indoor Football League (GLIFL).

In 11 NFL seasons, Rypien completed 1,466 of 2,613 passes for 18,473 yards, 115 touchdowns, and 88 interceptions. He rushed 127 times for 166 yards and 8 touchdowns.

== NASCAR ==
Rypien had a brief stint in NASCAR racing as a team owner, and was the original owner of the 2004 Nextel Cup championship-winning No. 97 team driven by Kurt Busch, having sold it to Jack Roush's Roush Racing in 1997.

== NFL career statistics ==
Legend
	Super Bowl MVP
	Won the Super Bowl
**Bold**	Career high

=== Regular season ===
Year	Team	Games			Passing							
Year	Team	GP	GS	Record	Cmp	Att	Pct	Yds	Avg	TD	Int	Rtg
1988	WAS	9	6	3−3	114	208	54.8	1,730	8.3	18	13	85.2
1989	WAS	14	14	9−5	**280**	476	58.8	**3,768**	7.9	22	13	88.1
1990	WAS	10	10	7−3	166	304	54.6	2,070	6.8	16	11	78.4
1991	WAS	16	16	**14−2**	249	421	59.1	3,564	**8.5**	**28**	11	97.9
1992	WAS	16	16	9−7	269	**479**	56.2	3,282	6.9	13	**17**	71.7
1993	WAS	12	10	3−7	166	319	52.0	1,514	4.7	4	10	56.3
1994	CLE	6	3	2−1	59	128	46.1	694	5.4	4	3	63.7
1995	STL	11	3	0−3	129	217	59.4	1,448	6.7	9	8	77.9
1996	PHI	1	0	—	10	13	**76.9**	76	5.8	1	0	**116.2**
1997	STL	5	0	—	19	39	48.7	270	6.9	0	2	50.2
2001	IND	4	0	—	5	9	55.6	57	6.3	0	0	74.8
Total		104	78	47−31	1,466	2,613	56.1	18,473	7.1	115	88	78.9

== Personal life ==
His father was of Polish descent, and his mother of Czech ancestry. On June 8, 2006, Rypien was inducted into the National Polish-American Sports Hall of Fame.

Rypien's cousins include NHL players Rick Rypien and Shane Churla, and his nephew is NFL quarterback Brett Rypien.

Rypien's daughter, Angela, played in the 2011 season for the Seattle Mist of the Lingerie Football League.

An avid golfer, Rypien has been known to participate in charity tournaments at various locations across the nation. He has played in one PGA Tour event (Kemper Open in 1992), and one Web.com Tour event (Buy.com Tri-Cities Open in 2000), and missed the 36-hole cut by a substantial margin both times.

He has been a regular competitor at the American Century Championship, the annual competition at Lake Tahoe to determine the best golfers among American sports and entertainment celebrities. Rypien won the inaugural event in 1990, and won his second crown 24 years later in 2014; he has a total of 11 top ten finishes. Televised by NBC in July, the tournament is played at Edgewood Tahoe Golf Course in Stateline, Nevada.

In a 2018 interview with the Spokane Spokesman-Review, Rypien's wife stated that she believes he is suffering from chronic traumatic encephalopathy (CTE) from football, with bizarre behavior occurring from time to time. Rypien himself confirmed that he has struggled with mental health issues since his retirement from football, even attempting suicide by overdosing on pills before his wife stopped him. On June 30, 2019, he was arrested on suspicion of domestic violence and charged with fourth-degree assault. The charge was dismissed on August 30, 2019.

In 2020, he was featured in the documentary "Quiet Explosions: Healing the Brain" produced and directed by Jerri Sher.

== Sources ==
- Associated Press (January 22, 2007). "Manning to have X-rays, should play in Super Bowl". ESPN.com.
