= Philadelphia Eagles draft history =

This page is a list of the Philadelphia Eagles NFL draft selections. The Eagles have participated in every NFL draft since it began in 1936, in which they made Jay Berwanger the first-ever selection.

== Key ==
= Pro Bowler, All-Pro, or AFL All-Star
= MVP
= Hall of Famer

== 1936 draft ==
Round	Pick #	Overall	Name	Position	College
1	1	1	Jay Berwanger	Halfback	Chicago
2	1	10	John McCauley	Back	Rice
3	1	19	Wes Muller	Center	Stanford
4	1	28	Bill Wallace	Halfback	Rice
5	1	37	Harry Shuford	Back	SMU
6	1	46	Al Barabas	Back	Columbia
7	1	55	Jac Weller	Guard	Princeton
8	1	64	Pepper Constable	Back	Princeton
9	1	73	Paul Pauk	Back	Princeton

== 1937 draft ==
Round	Pick #	Overall	Name	Position	College
1	1	1	Sam Francis	Back	Nebraska
2	1	11	Franny Murray	Back	Penn
3	1	21	Drew Ellis	Offensive tackle	TCU
4	1	31	Walt Gilbert	Back	Auburn
5	1	41	Alex Drobnitch	Guard	Colorado
6	1	51	Bill Guckeyson	Back	Maryland
7	1	61	Babe Barna	End	West Virginia
8	1	71	Nestor Hennon	End	Carnegie Mellon
9	1	81	Paul Fanning	Tackle	Kansas State
10	1	91	Ray Antil	End	Minnesota

== 1938 draft ==
Round	Pick #	Overall	Name	Position	College
1	2	2	Jim McDonald	Back	Ohio State
2	2	12	Dick Riffle	Back	Albright
3	2	17	Joe Bukant	Fullback	Washington (MO)
4	2	27	John Meek	Back	California
5	2	32	Fred Shirey	Tackle	Nebraska
6	2	42	Red Ramsey	End	Texas Tech
7	2	52	Bob Lannon	End	Iowa
8	2	62	Clem Woltman	Tackle	Purdue
9	2	72	Elmer Kolberg	Back	Oregon State
10	2	82	Emmett Kriel	Guard	Baylor
11	2	92	Carl Hinkle	Center	Vanderbilt
12	2	102	John Michelosen	Back	Pittsburgh

== 1939 draft ==
Round	Pick #	Overall	Name	Position	College
1	4	4	Davey O'Brien	Quarterback	TCU
2	4	14	Charles Newton	Back	Washington
3	4	19	Joe Mihal	Tackle	Purdue
4	4	29	Billy Dewell	End	SMU
5	4	34	Zed Coston	Center	Texas A&M
6	4	44	Jake Schuehle	Halfback	Rice
7	4	54	Tony Ippolito	Guard	Pudue
8	4	64	George Somers	Offensive tackle	La Salle
9	4	74	Rankin Britt	End	Texas A&M
10	4	84	Bill McKeever	Tackle	Cornell
11	4	94	Paul Humphrey	Center	Purdue
12	4	104	Jack Kraynick	Back	North Carolina
13	4	114	Allie White	Tackle	TCU
14	4	124	Joe Aleskus	Tackle	Ohio State
15	4	134	Foster Watkins	Quarterback	West Texas State
16	4	144	Irv Hall	Fullback	Brown
17	4	154	Bob Riddell	End	South Dakota State
18	4	164	Charlie Gainor	Defensive end	North Dakota
19	4	174	Morris White	Back	Tulsa
20	4	184	Dick Gormley	Center	LSU

== 1940 draft ==
Round	Pick #	Overall	Name	Position	College
1	2	2	George McAfee	Halfback	Duke
2	3	13	John Schiechl	Center	Santa Clara
3	2	17	Dick Favor	Back	Oklahoma
4	3	28	Eberle Schultz	Guard	Oregon State
5	2	32	Frank Emmons	Fullback	Oregon
6	3	43	Saul Singer	Tackle	Arkansas
7	2	52	Hal Pegg	Center	Bucknell
8	3	63	Don Looney	End	TCU
9	2	72	Don Jones	Back	Washington
10	3	83	Frank Maher	Back	Toledo
11	2	92	Elmer Hackney	Fullback	Kansas State
12	3	103	Durward Hoerner	End	TCU
13	2	112	Ted Hennis	Back	Purdue
14	3	123	Bill Bunsen	Back	Kansas
15	2	132	Don Crumbaker	End	Kansas State
16	3	143	J. R. Green	Tackle	Rice
17	2	152	Jim Molnar	Back	Bradley
18	3	163	Ernie Schwartzer	Guard	Boston College
19	2	172	Bill Schneller	Back	Ole Miss
20	3	183	Bill Debord	Tackle	Kansas State

== 1941 draft ==
Round	Pick #	Overall	Name	Position	College
2	1	11	Art Jones	Back	Richmond
3	1	16	Marion Pugh	Quarterback	Texas A&M
4	1	26	Al Ghesquiere	Halfback	Detroit
5	1	31	Royal Kahler	Tackle	Nebraska
6	1	41	Red Hickey	End	Arkansas
7	1	51	Julius Battista	Guard	Florida
9	1	71	P. K. Rogers	Back	East Texas State
10	1	81	Don Williams	Tackle	Texas
11	1	91	Marshall Stenstrom	Back	Oregon
12	1	101	John Patrick	Back	Penn State
13	1	111	Joe Hoague	Back	Colgate
14	1	121	Les Dodson	Back	Ole Miss
15	1	131	Alex Lukachik	End	Boston College
16	1	141	Bill Conatser	Back	Texas A&M
17	1	151	John Yauckoes	Tackle	Boston College
18	1	161	Joe McFadden	Back	Georgetown
19	1	171	John Shonk	End	West Virginia
20	1	181	L. B. Russell	Back	Hardin-Simmons
21	1	201	Charley Henke	Guard	Texas A&M
22	1	203	Mike Fernella	Tackle	Akron

== 1942 draft ==
Round	Pick #	Overall	Name	Position	College
1	3	3	Pete Kmetovic	Halfback	Stanford
2	3	13	Vic Lindskog	Center	Stanford
3	3	18	Ted Williams	Back	Boston College
4	3	28	Gordon Paschka	Fullback	Minnesota
5	3	33	Ernie Blandin	Tackle	Tulane
6	3	43	Earl Younglove	End	Washington
7	3	53	Bill Sewell	Quarterback	Washington State
8	3	63	Bill Halverson	Guard	Oregon State
9	3	73	Ray Graves	Center	Tennessee
10	3	83	Jack Stackpool	Back	Washington
11	3	93	Noble Doss	Halfback	Texas
12	3	103	Fred Meyer	End	Stanford
13	3	113	Bob Brenton	Tackle	Missouri
14	3	123	John Wyhonic	Guard	Alabama
15	3	133	O'Dell Griffin	Guard	Baylor
16	3	143	Bill Smaltz	Back	Penn State
17	3	153	Arnie Meiners	End	Stanford
18	3	163	Bill Braun	Tackle	Santa Clara
19	3	173	Charley Dvoracek	Back	Texas Tech
20	3	183	Marv Tommervik	Back	Pacific Lutheran

== 1943 draft ==
Round	Pick #	Overall	Name	Position	College
1	2	2	Joe Muha	Fullback	VMI
2	2	12	Lamar Davis	End	Georgia
3	2	17	Monk Gafford	Halfback	Auburn
4	2	27	Bob Kennedy	Back	Washington State
5	2	32	Al Wistert	Tackle	Michigan
6	2	42	Bruno Banducci	Guard	Stanford
7	2	52	Walt Harrison	Center	Washington
8	2	62	Bruce Alford	End	TCU
9	2	72	Rocco Canale	Tackle	Boston College
10	2	82	Bill Conoly	Tackle	Texas
11	2	92	John Billman	Guard	Minnesota
12	2	102	Jack Donaldson	Tackle	Penn
13	2	112	Bill Erickson	Center	Georgetown
14	2	122	George Weeks	End	Alabama
15	2	132	Russ Craft	Back	Alabama
16	2	142	Paul Darling	Back	Iowa State
17	2	152	Walt Gorinski	Halfback	LSU
18	2	162	Bob Friedman	Tackle	Washington
19	2	172	Johnny Bezemes	Back	Holy Cross
20	2	182	Chet Mutryn	Back	Xavier
21	2	192	Baptiste Manzini	Center	Saint Vincent
22	2	202	Bernie Gillespie	End	Scranton
23	2	212	Jay Lawhon	Tackle	Arkansas
24	2	222	Vince Zachem	Center	Morehead State
25	2	232	Joe Schwarting	End	Texas
26	2	242	Bob Neff	Tackle	Notre Dame
27	2	252	Art Macioszczyk	Fullback	Western Michigan
28	2	262	Jim Arata	Tackle	Xavier
29	2	272	Wally Scott	End	Texas
30	2	282	Stan Jaworowski	Tackle	Georgetown

== 1944 draft ==
Round	Pick #	Overall	Name	Position	College
1	5	5	Steve Van Buren	Halfback	LSU
3	4	20	Loren LaPrade	Guard	Stanford
5	4	36	Joe Parker	End	Texas
6	9	52	Hillary Horne	Tackle	Mississippi State
7	4	58	Vic Kulbitski	Fullback	Minnesota
8	9	74	George Phillips	Linebacker	UCLA
9	4	80	Paul Sarringhaus	Halfback	Ohio State
10	9	96	John Perko	Guard	Minnesota
11	4	102	Elliott Ormsbee	Back	Bradley
12	9	118	Earle Parsons	Halfback	USC
13	4	124	Bob Hanzlik	End	Wisconsin
14	9	140	Jim Talley	Center	LSU
15	4	146	Dom Fusci	Tackle	South Carolina
16	9	162	John Green	Defensive end	Tulsa
17	4	168	Jack Freeman	Back	William & Mary
18	9	184	Joe Kane	Back	Penn
19	4	190	Tony Schiro	Guard	Santa Clara
20	9	206	Norm Michael	Back	Syracuse
21	4	212	Eddie Kulakowski	Tackle	West Virginia
22	9	228	Al Postus	Back	Villanova
23	4	234	Milt Smith	End	UCLA
24	9	250	Earl Klapstein	Tackle	Pacific
25	4	256	Bob Frisbee	Back	Stanford
26	9	272	Ed Eiden	Back	Scranton
27	4	278	Barney Burdick	End	Creighton
28	9	294	Nick Daukas	Tackle	Dartmouth
29	4	300	Pasquale Darone	Guard	Boston College
30	9	316	Bill Clark	Tackle	Colorado College
31	4	322	Pete Pasko	End	East Stroudsburg
32	4	328	Myron Majewski	Tackle	American International

== 1945 draft ==
Round	Pick #	Overall	Name	Position	College
1	9	9	John Yonakor	End	Notre Dame
3	9	25	Alvin Dark	Quarterback	Southwestern Louisiana
5	9	41	Pete Pihos	End	Indiana
6	9	52	Chuck Dellago	Guard	Minnesota
7	9	63	Gonzalo Morales	Back	Saint Mary's (CA)
8	9	74	Sam Robinson	Back	Washington
9	9	85	Forrest Hall	Back	San Francisco
10	9	96	Joe Sadonis	Tackle	Fordham
11	9	107	Rudy Mobley	Back	Hardin-Simmons
12	9	118	Jim Newmeyer	Tackle	Saint Vincent
13	9	129	Bill Chambers	Guard	UCLA
14	9	140	John Duda	Back	Virginia
15	9	151	Bill Montgomery	Halfback	LSU
16	9	162	Howard Werner	End	Syracuse
17	9	173	Jim Austin	Back	Missouri
18	9	184	Quentin Klenk	Tackle	USC
19	9	195	Joe Spencer	Tackle	Oklahoma A&M
20	9	206	Leo Pratt	Tackle	Oklahoma A&M
21	9	217	Phil Teschner	Tackle	Brown
22	9	228	Johnny Magee	Guard	Rice
23	9	239	Norm Mosley	Back	Alabama
24	9	250	Blair Brown	Guard	Oklahoma A&M
25	9	261	Bob Hall	End	Stanford
26	9	272	Don Talcott	Tackle	Nevada
27	9	283	Bill Thompson	Tackle	New Mexico
28	9	294	Al Fleming	Center	Wichita State
29	9	305	Leo Benjamin	Center	West Virginia
30	9	316	Jim Dougherty	Back	Miami (OH)
31	4	322	Ken Reese	Back	Alabama
32	4	328	Loren Braner	Center	Pittsburgh

== 1946 draft ==
Round	Pick #	Overall	Name	Position	College
1	7	7	Leo Riggs	Back	USC
3	8	23	Gordon Gray	End	USC
5	7	37	Walt Slater	Back	Tennessee
6	8	48	Felto Prewitt	Center	Tulsa
7	7	57	George Robotham	End	UCLA
8	8	68	Jim Lecture	Guard	Northwestern
9	7	77	Ernie Lewis	Back	Colorado
10	8	88	Al Vandeweghe	End	William & Mary
11	7	97	Bill Iancelli	End	Franklin & Marshall
12	8	108	Pat McHugh	Back	Georgia Tech
13	7	117	John Wingender	Back	Washington
14	8	128	Homer Paine	Tackle	Oklahoma
15	7	137	John Kerns	Tackle	Ohio
16	8	148	Buddy Hubbard	Back	William & Mary
17	7	157	Allen Smith	Back	Tulsa
18	8	168	Bernie Millham	End	Fordham
19	7	177	Lawrence Mauss	Center	Utah
20	8	188	Dave Butcher	Back	William & Mary
21	7	197	Don Fabling	Back	Colorado
22	8	208	George Feldman	Back	Tufts
23	7	217	Ed Cameron	Guard	Miami (FL)
24	8	228	Charley Steed	Back	Arkansas-Monticello
25	7	237	Ed Grygiel	Back	Dartmouth
26	8	248	Ben Raimondi	Quarterback	Indiana
27	7	257	Sam Bailey	End	Georgia
28	8	268	Bob Long	Halfback	Tennessee
29	7	277	Bill Fisher	Tackle	Harvard
30	8	288	George Slusser	Back	Ohio State
31	2	292	John Itzel	Back	Pittsburgh
32	3	298	Larry Kirkman	Back	Boston University

== 1947 draft ==
Round	Pick #	Overall	Name	Position	College
1	8	8	Neill Armstrong	End	Oklahoma A&M
3	6	19	Bill Mackrides	Quarterback	Nevada
5	5	30	George Savitsky	Tackle	Penn
7	6	51	Tony Yovicsin	End	Miami (FL)
8	6	61	Alf Satterfield	Tackle	Vanderbilt
9	6	71	Bob Leonetti	Guard	Wake Forest
10	5	80	Ulysses Cornogg	Tackle	Wake Forest
11	6	91	Alex Sarkisian	Center	Northwestern
12	7	102	Jerry D'Arcy	Center	Tulsa
13	5	110	John Hamberger	Tackle	SMU
14	6	121	Alvin Johnson	Back	Hardin-Simmons
15	7	132	Joe Cook	Back	Hardin-Simmons
16	5	140	Jeff Durkota	Back	Penn State
17	7	152	Hubert Shurtz	Tackle	LSU
18	6	161	Hal Bell	Back	Muhlenberg
19	5	170	Tom Campion	Tackle	Southeastern Louisiana
20	7	182	Fred Hall	Guard	LSU
21	6	191	Jim Clayton	Tackle	Wyoming
22	5	200	George Blomquist	End	North Carolina State
23	7	212	Joe Haynes	Guard	Tulsa
24	6	221	Stanton Hense	End	Xavier
25	5	230	Johnny Kelly	Back	Rice
26	7	242	H. J. Roberts	Guard	Rice
27	6	251	Phil Cutchin	Quarterback	Kentucky
28	6	261	Charley Wakefield	Tackle	Stanford
29	7	272	Dick Lagenbeck	Tackle	Cincinnati
30	6	281	Bernie Winkler	Tackle	Texas Tech
31	3	288	Bill Stephens	Tackle	Baylor
32	5	298	Mike Kalash	End	Wisconsin–La Crosse

== 1948 draft ==
Round	Pick #	Overall	Name	Position	College
1	8	8	Clyde Scott	Halfback	Arkansas
3	9	22	Paul Campbell	Quarterback	Texas
5	8	33	Jack Myers	Back	UCLA
6	7	42	Howard Duncan	Center	Ohio State
7	9	54	Buddy Tinsley	Tackle	Baylor
8	8	63	Marty Wendell	Guard	Notre Dame
9	7	72	Scott Beasley	End	Nevada
10	9	84	T. Ray Richeson	Guard	Alabama
11	8	93	Gil Johnson	Quarterback	SMU
12	7	102	Bill Wyman	Tackle	Rice
13	9	114	Jim Waithall	Back	West Virginia
14	8	123	Dick Kempthorn	Fullback	Michigan
15	7	132	Dick Rifenburg	End	Michigan
16	9	144	Don Stanton	Tackle	Oregon
17	8	153	Ralph Kohl	Tackle	Michigan
18	7	162	Aubrey Fowler	Back	Arkansas
19	9	174	Rudy Krall	Back	New Mexico
20	8	183	Ed Claunch	Center	LSU
21	7	192	Negley Norton	Tackle	Penn State
22	9	204	Lockwood Frizzell	Center	Virginia
23	8	213	Jack Swaner	Back	California
24	7	222	Art Littleton	End	Penn
25	9	234	Jim Parmer	Back	Oklahoma A&M
26	8	243	Lou Creekmur	Tackle	William & Mary
27	7	252	Bill Stanton	Back	North Carolina State
28	9	264	Bennie Ellender	Back	Tulane
29	8	273	Rex Grossman	Back	Indiana
30	7	282	A. B. Kitchens	Tackle	Tulsa
31	7	292	Art Statuto	Center	Notre Dame
32	5	298	Tom Novak	Center	Nebraska

== 1949 draft ==
Round	Pick #	Overall	Name	Position	College
1	1	1	Chuck Bednarik	Center	Penn
1	9	9	Frank Tripucka	Quarterback	Notre Dame
2	8	19	Frank Burns	Quarterback	Rutgers
3	8	29	Frank Ziegler	Running back	Georgia Tech
4	10	41	Don Panciera	Quarterback	San Francisco
5	10	51	Terry Brennan	Halfback	Notre Dame
6	7	58	Warren Huey	End	Michigan State
7	10	71	Frank Gillespie	Guard	Clemson
8	10	81	Bob Dean	Back	Cornell
9	10	91	Jon Jenkins	Tackle	Dartmouth
10	10	101	Roy Lester	End	West Virginia
11	10	111	Bobby Wilson	Back	Ole Miss
12	10	121	Dale Armstrong	End	Dartmouth
13	10	131	Lyle Button	Tackle	Illinois
14	10	141	Bobby Lund	Back	Tennessee
15	10	151	Carl Copp	Tackle	Vanderbilt
16	10	161	Frank Reno	End	West Virginia
17	10	171	Leo Skladany	Defensive end	Pittsburgh
18	10	181	Russ Strait	Back	Muhlenberg
19	10	191	Paul Odom	Guard	Rollins
20	10	201	Lloyd Brinkman	Back	Missouri
21	10	211	Lou Futrell	Back	USC
22	10	221	Harvey Kingry	Back	Colorado Mines
23	10	231	Hank Kalver	Tackle	Oklahoma City
24	10	241	Fred Leon	Tackle	Nevada
25	10	251	John Schweder	Guard	Penn

== 1950 draft ==
Round	Pick #	Overall	Name	Position	College
1	14	14	Bud Grant	End	Minnesota
3	13	40	Bob Sanders	Back	Oregon
4	13	53	Bob McChesney	End	Hardin-Simmons
5	13	66	Mike Kaysserian	Back	Detroit
6	13	79	Lloyd McDermott	Tackle	Kentucky
7	13	92	Mel Olix	Back	Miami (OH)
8	13	105	Dick O'Hanlon	Tackle	Ohio State
9	13	118	Bobby Wilson	Back	Ole Miss
10	13	131	Ernie Johnson	Back	UCLA
11	13	144	Bobby Lantrip	Back	Rice
12	13	157	Frank Mahoney	End	Brown
13	13	170	Norm Willey	Defensive end	Marshall
14	13	183	Billy Hix	End	Arkansas
15	13	196	Herb Carey	Back	Dartmouth
16	13	209	Jim Marck	Tackle	Xavier
17	13	222	Jerry Taylor	Center	Mississippi State
18	13	235	Ed Tunnicliff	Back	Northwestern
19	13	248	Darrell Robinson	End	Oregon
20	13	261	Merv Pregulman	Guard	Michigan
21	13	274	Marv Cross	Back	Washington State
22	13	287	Jim Hague	End	Ohio State
23	13	300	Al Lesko	Tackle	St. Bonaventure
24	13	313	Tom DeSylvia	Guard	Oregon State
25	13	326	Jim Eagles	Center	North Texas State
26	13	339	Rod Franz	Guard	California
27	13	352	Bill Martin	Back	USC
28	13	365	Don Burson	Back	Northwestern
29	13	378	Wes Curtier	Tackle	Richmond
30	13	391	Dud Parker	Back	Baylor

== 1951 draft ==
Round	Pick #	Overall	Name	Position	College
1	7	7	Ebert Van Buren	Back	LSU
1	8	8	Chet Mutryn	Back	Xavier
3	6	32	Al Bruno	End	Kentucky
4	5	43	Fran Nagle	Quarterback	Nebraska
5	7	57	Jack Dwyer	Back	Loyola Marymount
6	6	68	Ken Farragut	Center	Ole Miss
7	5	79	Frank Boydston	Back	Baylor
8	7	93	Jack Richards	End	Arkansas
9	6	104	Denny Doyle	Guard	Tulane
10	6	116	Louis Schaufele	Back	Arkansas
11	7	130	Bob Pope	Tackle	Kentucky
12	6	141	Henry Rich	Back	Arizona State
13	5	152	Pete Mastellone	Center	Miami (FL)
14	7	166	Bobby Walston	End	Georgia
15	6	177	Bobby North	Back	Georgia Tech
16	5	188	Hal Hatfield	End	USC
17	7	202	Hal Waggoner	Back	Tulane
18	6	213	Bill Weeks	Quarterback	Iowa
19	5	224	Jack Bove	Tackle	West Virginia
20	7	238	John Glorioso	Back	Missouri
21	6	249	Neal Franklin	Tackle	SMU
22	5	260	Jack Rucker	Back	Mississippi State
23	7	274	Jack Bighead	End	Pepperdine
24	6	285	Tony Kotowski	Tackle	Mississippi State
25	5	296	Glenn Drahn	Back	Iowa
26	7	310	Billy Stewart	Back	Mississippi State
27	6	321	Bob Winship	Tackle	Rice
28	5	332	Marv Stendel	End	Arkansas
29	7	346	Roscoe Hansen	Tackle	North Carolina
30	6	357	John Ford	Quarterback	Hardin-Simmons

== 1952 draft ==
Round	Pick #	Overall	Name	Position	College
1	5	5	Johnny Bright	Back	Drake
2	4	17	Jim Weatherall	Defensive Tackle	Oklahoma
3	4	29	Lum Snyder	Offensive tackle	Georgia Tech
4	4	41	Chuck Ulrich	Defensive Tackle	Illinois
6	4	65	Dick Lemmon	Back	California
7	4	77	John Thomas	End	Oregon State
8	4	89	Wayne Robinson	Linebacker	Minnesota
9	4	101	Maury Nipp	Guard	Loyola Marymount
10	4	113	Gerry McGinley	Guard	Penn
11	4	125	Ralph Goldston	Back	Youngstown State
12	4	137	Jack Blount	Tackle	Mississippi State
13	4	149	Ed Hamilton	Back	Kentucky
14	4	161	Bob Stringer	Back	Tulsa
15	4	173	Malcolm Schmidt	End	Iowa State
16	4	185	Jim Brewer	Guard	North Texas
17	4	197	John Weigle	End	Oklahoma A&M
18	4	209	Ed Romanowski	Back	Scranton
19	4	221	Talbott Trammell	End	Washington and Lee
20	4	233	Bob Blaik	Back	Army
21	4	245	Les Wheeler	Guard	Abilene Christian
22	4	257	Johnny Turco	Back	Holy Cross
23	4	269	Maury Schnell	Back	Iowa State
24	4	281	Joe Tyrrell	Guard	Temple
25	4	293	Bob Kelley	Center	West Texas State
26	4	305	Bob Albert	Back	Bucknell
27	4	317	Chuck Hill	Back	New Mexico
28	4	329	John Brewer	Fullback	Louisville
29	4	341	Tony Morocco	Back	Georgia
30	4	353	Don Stevens	Back	Illinois

== 1953 draft ==
Round	Pick #	Overall	Name	Position	College
2	7	20	Al Conway	Back	William Jewell
3	9	34	Don Johnson	Back	California
4	8	45	George Mrkonic	Tackle	Kansas
5	7	56	Eddie Bell	Halfback	Penn
5	12	61	Rex Smith	End	Illinois
7	3	76	Jack Erickson	Tackle	Army
7	8	81	Ray Malavasi	Guard	Army
8	7	92	Jess Richardson	Defensive Tackle	Alabama
9	9	106	Roger French	End	Minnesota
10	8	117	Tom Brookshier	Cornerback	Colorado
11	7	128	Bob Pollard	Back	Penn State
12	9	142	George Porter	Tackle	San Jose State
13	8	153	Ray Westort	Guard	Utah
14	7	164	Roy Bailey	Back	Tulane
15	9	178	Willie Irvin	Defensive Back	Florida A&M
16	8	189	Bud Wallace	Back	North Carolina
17	7	200	Tony Rados	Back	Penn State
18	9	214	Marv Trauth	Tackle	Ole Miss
19	8	225	Pete Bachouros	Back	Illinois
20	7	236	Rollie Arns	Center	Iowa State
21	9	250	Hal Brooks	Tackle	Washington and Lee
22	8	261	Laurie LeClaire	Back	Michigan
23	7	272	Jeff Knox	End	Georgia Tech
24	9	286	Eli Romero	Back	Wichita State
25	8	297	Johnny Michels	Guard	Tennessee
26	7	308	Harvey Achziger	Tackle	Colorado State
27	9	322	Earl Hersh	Back	West Chester (PA)
28	8	333	Joe Gratson	Back	Penn State
29	7	344	Ralph Paolone	Back	Kentucky
30	8	357	Chuck Hren	Back	Northwestern

== 1954 draft ==
Round	Pick #	Overall	Name	Position	College
1	9	9	Neil Worden	Fullback	Notre Dame
2	8	21	Rocky Ryan	End	Illinois
3	8	33	Ted Connor	Tackle	Nebraska
4	8	45	Menil Mavraides	Guard	Notre Dame
6	8	69	Hal Lambert	Tackle	TCU
7	8	81	Jerry Norton	Safety	SMU
8	8	93	Dan Hunter	Tackle	Florida
9	8	105	Phil Branch	Guard	Texas
11	8	129	Dave McLaughlin	End	Dartmouth
12	8	141	Dick Clasby	Back	Harvard
13	8	153	Joe Mehalick	Tackle	Virginia
14	8	165	Hal Patterson	End	Kansas
15	8	177	Ray McKown	Back	TCU
16	8	189	Charlie Grant	Center	Utah
17	8	201	Bob Knowles	Tackle	Baylor
18	8	213	Sam Mrvos	Guard	Georgia
19	8	225	Jerry Clem	Guard	SMU
20	8	237	Tommy Bailes	Back	Houston
21	8	249	Johnny Crouch	End	TCU
22	8	261	Jim Wojciehowski	End	Purdue
23	8	273	Harold Lofton	Back	Ole Miss
24	8	285	Nate Gressette	Tackle	Clemson
25	8	297	Ray Zambiasi	Back	Detroit
26	8	309	Charley Smith	Back	Baylor
27	8	321	Ben Addiego	Back	Villanova
28	8	333	John Gerdes	Tackle	Cornell
29	8	345	Jack Stone	Back	West Virginia
30	8	357	Tommy Woodlee	Back	South Carolina

== 1955 draft ==
Round	Pick #	Overall	Name	Position	College
1	9	9	Dick Bielski	Fullback	Maryland
2	9	22	Buck Lansford	Offensive tackle	Texas
3	8	33	Frank Eidom	Back	SMU
4	9	46	Dean Dugger	End	Ohio State
5	8	57	Gene Lamone	Guard	West Virginia
6	9	70	Billy Quinn	Back	Texas
7	8	81	Bill McKenna	End	Brandeis
8	9	94	Herman Watson	Tackle	Vanderbilt
9	8	105	Von Morgan	End	Abilene Christian
10	9	118	Duke Washington	Back	Washington State
11	8	129	Bob Hardy	Back	Kentucky
12	9	142	Andy Nacrelli	End	Fordham
13	8	153	Jerry Krisher	Center	Ohio State
14	9	166	Tommy Bell	Back	Army
15	8	177	Don Brougher	Center	Maryland
16	9	190	Clyde White	Guard	Clemson
17	8	201	Nick Maravic	Back	Wake Forest
18	9	214	Duane Nutt	Back	SMU
19	8	225	Terry Fails	End	Vanderbilt
20	9	238	Jimmy Wade	Back	Tennessee
21	8	249	John Anderson	End	Kansas
22	9	262	Ernie Lewis	Guard	Arizona
23	8	273	Hootie Ingram	Back	Alabama
24	9	286	Vic Postula	Back	Michigan State
25	8	297	Frank Pavich	Guard	USC
26	9	310	George Palachunik	Guard	Maryland
27	8	321	Bob Gringrass	Back	Wisconsin
28	9	334	Wingo Avery	Center	Clemson
29	8	345	Ron Lloyd	Tackle	Bucknell
30	8	357	Dave Finney	Back	TCU

== 1956 draft ==
Round	Pick #	Overall	Name	Position	College
1	4	4	Bob Pellegrini	Linebacker	Maryland
2	3	16	Frank D'Agostino	Offensive tackle	Auburn
3	3	28	Don Schaefer	Fullback	Notre Dame
5	5	54	Fuzzy Thurston	Guard	Valparaiso
6	4	65	Tirrel Burton	Halfback	Miami (OH)
7	5	78	John Waedekin	Tackle	Hardin-Simmons
8	4	89	Elroy Payne	Back	McMurry
9	5	102	Johnny Bredice	End	Boston University
10	4	113	Tom Dimmick	Center	Houston
11	5	126	Kenny Keller	Back	North Carolina
12	4	137	Tommy Harkins	End	Vanderbilt
13	5	150	James Sides	Back	Texas Tech
14	4	161	Frank Relch	Center	Penn State
15	5	174	Don Brant	Back	Montana
16	4	185	Billy Hix	Tackle	Middle Tennessee State
17	5	198	Joe Mastrogiovanni	Back	Wyoming
18	4	209	Nick Consoles	Defensive Back	Wake Forest
19	5	222	Delano Womack	Back	Texas
20	4	233	Darrell Glover	Tackle	Maryland Eastern Shore
21	5	246	Jack Adams	Tackle	San Jose State
22	4	257	Joe Miller	Back	Cincinnati
23	5	270	Chet Spencer	End	Oklahoma A&M
24	4	281	John Parham	Back	Wake Forest
25	5	294	Johnny Grogan	Tackle	Dayton
26	4	305	Earl Lunsford	Fullback	Oklahoma A&M
27	5	318	Al Ellett	Tackle	Alabama
28	4	329	Bill Strawn	Linebacker	Western Kentucky
29	5	342	Bob Hughes	Back	Southern Miss
30	3	352	Joe Ulm	Back	San Jose State

== 1957 draft ==
Round	Pick #	Overall	Name	Position	College
1	7	7	Clarence Peaks	Fullback	Michigan State
2	6	19	Billy Ray Barnes	Halfback	Wake Forest
3	6	31	Tommy McDonald	Wide receiver	Oklahoma
4	6	43	Sonny Jurgensen	Quarterback	Duke
5	1	50	Jimmy Harris	Defensive Back	Oklahoma
7	1	74	Tom Saidock	Defensive Tackle	Michigan State
8	1	86	Hal McElhaney	Back	Duke
9	1	98	Harold Davis	Quarterback	Westminster College (PA)
10	1	110	Don Bruhns	Center	Drake
11	1	122	Gil Shoaf	Tackle	Wabash
12	1	134	Buddy Dike	Back	TCU
13	1	146	Hubert Bobo	Linebacker	Ohio State
14	1	158	Jerry Cashman	Tackle	Syracuse
15	1	170	Mort Moriarty	End	Texas
16	1	182	John Nocera	Linebacker	Iowa
17	1	194	Dan Radakovich	Center	Penn State
18	1	206	Billy Kelley	Tackle	Baylor
19	1	218	Paul Harasimowicz	Tackle	Vermont
20	1	230	Leroy Thompson	Back	Butler
21	1	242	Charley Brooks	End	Michigan
22	1	254	John Simerson	Center	Purdue
23	1	266	Lou Lovely	Guard	Boston University
24	1	278	Dennis McGill	Back	Yale
25	1	290	Bob Ratliff	Back	West Texas State
26	1	302	Alvin Richardson	Tackle	Grambling State
27	1	314	Frank Hall	Back	USC
28	1	326	Clem Corona	Guard	Michigan
29	1	338	John Niznik	End	Wake Forest
30	1	350	Larry Hubbard	End	Marquette

== 1958 draft ==
Round	Pick #	Overall	Name	Position	College
1	6	6	Walt Kowalczyk	Back	Michigan State
2	4	17	Proverb Jacobs	Tackle	California
4	6	43	Frank Rigney	Offensive tackle	Iowa
5	3	52	Bobby Mulgado	Back	Arizona State
6	3	64	John Kersey	Tackle	Duke
7	3	76	Len Mansfield	Tackle	Pittsburg State
8	3	88	Bill Striegel	Linebacker	Pacific
10	3	112	Theron Sapp	Running back	Georgia
11	3	124	Mel Dillard	Back	Purdue
12	3	136	Jack Crabtree	Quarterback	Oregon
13	3	148	Mickey Trimarki	Quarterback	West Virginia
14	3	160	Bill Lapham	Center	Iowa
15	3	172	Stan Hinos	Tackle	Mississippi Valley State
16	3	184	Mike Meatheringham	Tackle	Georgia
17	3	196	Bill Van Buren	Center	Iowa
18	3	208	John Burroughs	Tackle	Iowa
19	3	220	Ron Sabal	Tackle	Purdue
20	3	232	Kent Lovelace	Back	Ole Miss
21	3	244	John Madden	Tackle	Cal Poly
22	3	256	George Sherwood	End	Saint Joseph's (IN)
23	3	268	Billy Templeton	End	Ole Miss
24	3	280	Jim Padgett	Center	Clemson
25	3	292	Hal Divine	Tackle	Memphis State
26	3	304	Neil MacLean	Back	Wake Forest
27	3	316	Hindman Wall	End	Auburn
28	3	328	Gene Gossage	Tackle	Northwestern
29	3	340	Don McDonald	Back	Houston
30	2	351	Jim Thompson	End	Temple

== 1959 draft ==
Round	Pick #	Overall	Name	Position	College
2	3	15	J. D. Smith	Offensive tackle	Rice
3	2	26	Wray Carlton	Halfback	Duke
4	3	39	Jim Grazione	Quarterback	Villanova
5	3	51	Nick Mumley	Tackle	Purdue
6	2	62	Al Benecick	Guard	Syracuse
8	2	86	Willmer Fowler	Halfback	Northwestern
9	3	99	Gene Johnson	Defensive Back	Cincinnati
10	2	110	Rollie West	Back	Villanova
11	3	123	Art Powell	Wide receiver	San Jose State
12	2	134	Howard Keys	Tackle	Oklahoma State
13	3	147	Dick Stillwagon	Back	Purdue
14	2	158	Jack Smith	Tackle	Clemson
15	3	171	Jim Poteete	Center	Mississippi State
16	2	182	Ken Paduch	Tackle	Auburn
17	3	195	Bill Craig	Tackle	Villanova
18	2	206	Jim Benson	Back	Georgia Tech
19	3	219	Alan Miller	Fullback	Boston College
20	2	230	Jim Payne	Guard	Clemson
21	3	243	Bob Salerno	Guard	Colorado
22	2	254	Jim Bowie	Tackle	Kentucky
23	3	267	Dick Williams	End	Southern
24	2	278	Gerry Benn	Tackle	Oklahoma State
25	3	291	Dick Jamieson	Quarterback	Bradley
26	2	302	Jim Burks	Tackle	Virginia Tech
27	3	315	Lowell Jenkins	Tackle	Wisconsin
28	2	326	Leo Sexton	End	Auburn
29	3	339	John Stolte	Tackle	Kansas State
30	2	350	Angelo Mosca	Defensive Tackle	Notre Dame

== 1960 draft ==
Round	Pick #	Overall	Name	Position	College
1	9	9	Ron Burton	Running back	Northwestern
2	8	20	Maxie Baughan	Linebacker	Georgia Tech
3	7	31	Curt Merz	Guard	Iowa
4	4	40	Ted Dean	Running Back	Wichita State
4	9	45	Jack Cummings	Quarterback	North Carolina
5	8	56	Don Norton	End	Iowa
6	7	67	Emmett Wilson	Tackle	Georgia Tech
7	9	81	John Wilkins	Tackle	USC
8	8	92	Monte Lee	End	Texas
12	7	139	Dave Grosz	Quarterback	Oregon
13	9	153	Dave Graham	Tackle	Virginia
14	8	164	Ray Petersen	Back	West Virginia
15	7	175	John Wilcox	Defensive Tackle	Oregon
16	9	189	Larry Lancaster	Tackle	Georgia
17	8	200	Mike Graney	End	Notre Dame
18	7	211	Emory Turner	Guard	Purdue
19	9	225	Bob Hain	Tackle	Iowa
20	8	236	Ramon Armstrong	Tackle	TCU

== 1961 draft ==
Round	Pick #	Overall	Name	Position	College
1	14	14	Art Baker	Fullback	Syracuse
2	14	28	Bo Strange	Center	LSU
3	8	36	Jim Wright	Quarterback	Memphis State
3	14	42	Don Oakes	Offensive tackle	Virginia Tech
4	11	53	Dan Ficca	Guard	USC
6	14	84	Ben Balme	Guard	Yale
7	14	98	Irv Cross	Cornerback	Northwestern
8	14	112	Jim Beaver	Guard	Florida
9	14	126	Wayne Fontes	Defensive Back	Michigan State
10	14	140	Luther Hayes	End	USC
11	14	154	L. E. Hicks	Tackle	Florida
12	14	168	Billy Majors	Back	Tennessee
13	14	182	Don Jonas	Quarterback	Penn State
14	14	196	Willie Fleming	Running back	Iowa
15	14	210	Bobby Richards	Defensive Tackle	LSU
16	14	224	G. W. Clapp	Guard	Auburn
17	14	238	Larry Lavery	Tackle	Illinois
18	14	252	Nick Maravich	Tackle	North Carolina State
19	14	266	Dick Wilson	Center	Penn State
20	14	280	Jacque MacKinnon	Tight end	Colgate

== 1962 draft ==
Round	Pick #	Overall	Name	Position	College
2	13	27	Pete Case	Guard	Georgia
3	12	40	Pat Holmes	Defensive end	Texas Tech
4	13	55	Bill Byrne	Guard	Boston College
6	7	77	Gus Gonzales	Guard	Tulane
6	13	83	John McGeever	Cornerback	Auburn
7	2	86	Jim Perkins	Tackle	Colorado
7	12	96	Frank Budd	Wide receiver	Villanova
8	13	111	Ralph Smith	Tight end	Ole Miss
9	12	124	Bob Butler	Tackle	Kentucky
10	13	139	Jim Skaggs	Guard	Washington
11	12	152	George Horne	Tackle	BYU
12	13	167	Larry Thompson	Center	Tulane
13	12	180	George McKinney	Back	Arkansas
14	13	195	Jim Schwab	End	Penn State
15	12	208	Mike Woulfe	Guard	Colorado
16	13	223	Jerry Mazzanti	Tackle	Arkansas
17	12	236	Mike Martin	Tackle	Washington State
18	13	251	Tom Larscheid	Running back	Utah State
19	12	264	Harold Ericksen	Guard	Georgia Tech
20	13	279	Ron Turner	End	Wichita State

== 1963 draft ==
Round	Pick #	Overall	Name	Position	College
1	4	4	Ed Budde	Guard	Michigan State
2	4	18	Ray Mansfield	Center	Washington
3	4	32	Dave Crossan	Center	Maryland
3	12	40	Louis Guy	Back	Ole Miss
7	4	88	Lee Roy Caffey	Linebacker	Texas A&M
8	4	102	Tom Woodeshick	Running back	West Virginia
8	8	106	Gene Sykes	Defensive Back	LSU
9	4	116	Dennis Ward	Tackle	Oklahoma
10	4	130	Pete Liske	Quarterback	Penn State
11	4	144	Ralph Heck	Linebacker	Colorado
12	4	158	Roger Gill	Back	Texas Tech
13	4	172	Joe Iacone	Running Back	West Chester (PA)
14	4	186	Nate Ramsey	Defensive Back	Indiana
15	4	200	George Heard	End	New Mexico
16	4	214	Ronnie Goodwin	Back	Baylor
17	4	228	Gordon Rush	Back	Tulane
18	4	242	Rudy Mathews	Tackle	TCU
19	4	256	Mike Wasdovich	Guard	Indiana
20	4	270	Ben Rizzo	Back	Miami (FL)

== 1964 draft ==
Round	Pick #	Overall	Name	Position	College
1	2	2	Bob Brown	Offensive tackle	Nebraska
2	2	16	Jack Concannon	Quarterback	Boston College
4	4	46	Ray Kubala	Center	Texas A&M
5	2	58	Mickey Babb	End	Georgia
6	2	72	Al Denson	Tight end	Florida A&M
7	2	86	Pete Goimarac	Center	West Virginia
9	2	114	Larry Smith	Back	Ole Miss
10	2	128	Tom Boris	Back	Purdue
11	2	142	Bob Berry	Quarterback	Oregon
12	2	156	John Sapinsky	Tackle	William & Mary
13	2	170	Howard Kindig	Defensive end	Los Angeles State
14	2	184	Ernie Arizzi	Back	Maryland
15	2	198	Bob Burrows	Tackle	East Texas State
16	2	212	Will Radosevich	Tackle	Wyoming
17	2	226	Mike Morgan	Linebacker	LSU
18	2	240	Izzy Lang	Running back	Tennessee State
19	2	254	Dick Bowe	Tackle	Rice
20	2	268	Tommy Lucas	Guard	Ole Miss

== 1965 draft ==
Round	Pick #	Overall	Name	Position	College
2	6	20	Ray Rissmiller	Offensive tackle	Georgia
3	7	35	Al Nelson	Cornerback	Cincinnati
4	6	48	Fred Hill	Tight end	USC
5	7	63	John Henderson	Wide receiver	Michigan
6	6	76	John Huarte	Quarterback	Notre Dame
6	7	77	Gary Garrison	Wide Receiver	San Diego State
7	7	91	Erwin Will	Tackle	Dayton
8	6	104	Al Piraino	Tackle	Wisconsin
9	7	119	Floyd Hudlow	Defensive Back	Arizona
10	6	132	Rick Redman	Linebacker	Washington
11	7	147	Louis James	Running back	Texas Western
12	7	161	John Kuznieski	Running Back	Purdue
13	7	175	John Fouse	End	Arizona
14	6	188	Tom Longo	Defensive Back	Notre Dame
15	7	203	Otis Taylor	Wide Receiver	Prairie View A&M
16	6	216	Jim Gray	Back	Toledo
17	7	231	Dave Austin	End	Georgia Tech
18	6	244	Bill Marcordes	End	Bradley
19	7	259	Charley Englehart	Tackle	John Carroll
20	6	272	Bobby Shann	End	Boston College

== 1966 draft ==
Round	Pick #	Overall	Name	Position	College
1	4	4	Randy Beisler	Defensive end	Indiana
2	4	20	Gary Pettigrew	Defensive End	Stanford
3	4	36	Ben Hawkins	Wide receiver	Arizona State
4	4	52	Frank Emanuel	Linebacker	Tennessee
5	4	68	Dan Berry	Quarterback	California
6	4	84	Bob Sherlag	Wide Receiver	Memphis State
6	9	89	Mel Tom	Defensive End	San Jose State
7	4	99	David Lince	Tackle	North Dakota
8	4	114	John Mason	End	Stanford
9	4	129	Jim Todd	Running back	Ball State
10	4	144	John Osmond	Center	Tulsa
11	4	159	Welford Walton	Defensive end	Nevada
12	4	174	Bruce Van Dyke	Guard	Missouri
13	4	189	Jim Bohl	Running Back	New Mexico State
14	4	204	Ron Medved	Defensive Back	Washington
15	4	219	Harry Day	Tackle	Memphis State
16	4	234	Arunas Vasys	Linebacker	Notre Dame
17	4	249	Ike Kelley	Linebacker	Ohio State
18	4	264	Bill Moorer	Center	Georgia Tech
19	4	279	Taft Reed	Defensive Back	Jackson State
20	4	294	Bill Risio	Tackle	Boston College
20	8	298	Gerald Circo	Kicker	Chico State

== 1967 draft ==
Round	Pick #	Overall	Name	Position	College
1	19	19	Harry Jones	Running back	Arkansas
2	18	44	John Brooks	Guard	Kent State
3	15	68	Harry Wilson	Running Back	Nebraska
4	19	99	Chuck Hughes	Wide receiver	Texas Western
5	7	114	Bob Van Pelt	Center	Indiana
5	18	125	Dick Absher	Linebacker	Maryland
6	20	153	Bob Hughes	Defensive end	Jackson State
7	15	174	John Williams	Defensive Back	San Diego State
7	19	178	Bob Crenshaw	Guard	New Mexico State
8	18	203	Don Klacking	Running Back	Wyoming
9	20	231	Harold Stancell	Defensive Back	Tennessee
10	19	256	Maurice Bates	Defensive End	Northern State
11	18	281	Omar Parker	Guard	Washington
12	19	309	Ben Monroe	Quarterback	New Mexico
13	19	334	Bill Downes	Defensive Tackle	Louisville
14	17	358	Dick Kenney	Kicker	Michigan State
15	20	387	David Poche	Tackle	McNeese
16	19	412	Lynn Baker	Defensive Back	Colorado
17	18	437	George Catavolos	Defensive Back	Purdue

== 1968 draft ==
Round	Pick #	Overall	Name	Position	College
1	14	14	Tim Rossovich	Linebacker	USC
2	12	39	Cyril Pinder	Running back	Illinois
3	13	68	Adrian Young	Linebacker	USC
4	12	95	Len McNeil	Guard	Fresno State
5	11	122	Mike Dirks	Tackle	Wyoming
5	12	123	Mark Nordquist	Guard	Pacific
6	12	150	Thurman Randle	Tackle	UTEP
6	19	157	Dave Martin	Defensive Back	Notre Dame
7	13	178	Joe Przybycki	Guard	Michigan State
8	12	204	Al Lavan	Defensive Back	Colorado State
9	13	232	Mike Evans	Center	Boston College
10	12	258	John Mallory	Defensive Back	West Virginia
11	13	286	Len Persin	Defensive end	Boston College
12	12	312	Thurston Taylor	Tight end	Florida State
13	13	340	George Barron	Tackle	Mississippi State
14	12	366	Dan Williamson	Linebacker	West Virginia
15	13	394	Joe Graham	Guard	Tennessee
16	12	420	Phil Creel	Tackle	Northwestern State
17	13	448	Joe Forzani	Guard	Utah State
17	24	459	Frank Antonini	Running Back	Parsons

== 1969 draft ==
Round	Pick #	Overall	Name	Position	College
1	3	3	Leroy Keyes	Running back	Purdue
2	2	28	Ernie Calloway	Defensive Lineman	Texas Southern
3	17	69	Bill Bradley	Texas	Safety
4	2	80	Bob Kuechenberg	Guard	Notre Dame
5	3	107	Jim Anderson	Guard	Missouri
6	2	132	Richard Barnhorst	Tight end	Xavier
7	3	159	Mike Schmeising	Running Back	St. Olaf
8	2	184	Bill Hobbs	Linebacker	Texas A&M
9	3	211	Kent Lawrence	Wide receiver	Georgia
9	10	218	Lynn Buss	Linebacker	Wisconsin
10	2	236	Sonny Wade	Quarterback	Emory and Henry
10	9	243	Donnie Shanklin	Running Back	Kansas
11	3	263	Jim Marcum	Defensive Back	Texas-Arlington
12	2	288	Gary Adams	Defensive Back	Arkansas
13	3	314	Wade Key	Offensive Lineman	Texas State
14	2	340	James Ross	Tackle	Bishop
15	3	367	Leon Angevine	Wide Receiver	Penn State
16	2	392	Tom McClinton	Defensive Back	Southern
17	3	419	Bob Haack	Tackle	Linfield

== 1970 draft ==
Round	Pick #	Overall	Name	Position	College
1	6	6	Steve Zabel	Linebacker	Oklahoma
2	8	34	Ray Jones	Defensive Back	Southern
3	7	59	Lee Bouggess	Running back	Louisville
7	2	158	Terry Brennan	Tackle	Notre Dame
8	8	190	Ira Gordon	Offensive tackle	Kansas State
9	7	215	David King	Linebacker	Stephen F. Austin
10	6	240	Steve Jaggard	Defensive Back	Memphis State
11	8	268	Bill Walik	Defensive Back	Villanova
12	7	293	Robert Jones	Defensive Tackle	Grambling State
13	6	318	Richard Stevens	Tackle	Baylor
14	8	346	Mark Moseley	Kicker	Stephen F. Austin
15	7	371	John Carlos	Wide receiver	San Jose State
16	6	396	Tuufuli Uperesa	Guard	Montana
17	8	424	Mike Sizelove	Tight end	Idaho

== 1971 draft ==
Round	Pick #	Overall	Name	Position	College
1	5	5	Richard Harris	Defensive end	Grambling State
2	24	50	Hank Allison	Offensive tackle	San Diego State
4	5	83	Happy Feller	Kicker	Texas
5	4	108	Tom Shellabarger	Tackle	San Diego State
6	3	133	Jack Smith	Defensive Back	Troy State
6	24	154	Wyck Neely	Defensive Back	Ole Miss
7	5	161	Harold Carmichael	Wide receiver	Southern
8	4	186	Leonard Gotschalk	Center	Humboldt State
9	3	211	Len Pettigrew	Linebacker	Ashland
10	22	256	Tom Bailey	Running back	Florida State
11	4	264	Albert Davis	Running Back	Tennessee State
12	3	289	Rich Saathoff	Defensive End	Northern Arizona
13	5	317	Danny Lester	Defensive Back	Texas
14	4	342	Robert Creech	Linebacker	TCU
15	3	367	Ed Fisher	Guard	Prairie View A&M
16	5	395	Bruce James	Linebacker	Arkansas
17	4	420	John Sage	Linebacker	LSU

== 1972 draft ==
Round	Pick #	Overall	Name	Position	College
1	14	14	John Reaves	Quarterback	Florida
2	11	37	Dan Yochum	Offensive tackle	Syracuse
3	16	68	Tom Luken	Guard	Purdue
3	24	76	Bobby Majors	Defensive Back	Tennessee
4	14	92	Po James	Running back	New Mexico State
6	14	144	Vern Winfield	Guard	Minnesota
7	14	170	Will Foster	Linebacker	Eastern Michigan
8	14	196	Larry Ratcliff	Running Back	Eastern Michigan
9	14	222	Pat Gibbs	Defensive Back	Lamar
10	14	248	John Bunting	Linebacker	North Carolina
11	14	274	Dennis Sweeney	Defensive end	Western Michigan
12	14	300	Don Zimmerman	Wide receiver	Louisiana-Monroe
13	14	326	Preston Carpenter	Defensive End	Ole Miss
14	14	352	Bill Overmyer	Linebacker	Ashland
15	14	378	Tom Sullivan	Running back	Miami (FL)
16	14	404	Steve Bielenberg	Linebacker	Oregon State
17	14	430	Tom Nash	Tackle	Georgia

== 1973 draft ==
Round	Pick #	Overall	Name	Position	College
1	3	3	Jerry Sisemore	Offensive tackle	Texas
1	6	6	Charle Young	Tight end	USC
2	2	28	Guy Morriss	Guard	TCU
3	3	55	Randy Logan	Safety	Michigan
6	2	132	Bob Picard	Wide receiver	Eastern Washington State
7	3	159	Will Wynn	Defensive end	Tennessee State
8	2	184	Dan Lintner	Defensive Back	Indiana
9	3	221	John Nokes	Linebacker	Northern Illinois
11	3	263	Gary Van Elst	Defensive Tackle	Michigan State
12	2	288	Joe Lavender	Cornerback	San Diego State
13	3	315	Stan Davis	Wide Receiver	Memphis State
14	2	340	Ralph Sacra	Tackle	Texas A&M
15	3	367	Ken Schlezes	Defensive Back	Notre Dame
16	2	392	Frank Dowsing	Defensive Back	Mississippi State
17	3	419	Greg Oliver	Running back	Trinity (TX)

== 1974 draft ==
Round	Pick #	Overall	Name	Position	College
3	11	63	Mitch Sutton	Defensive Tackle	Kansas
4	11	89	Frank LeMaster	Linebacker	Kentucky
5	4	108	Jim Cagle	Defensive Tackle	Georgia
5	11	115	Keith Krepfle	Tight end	Iowa State
7	11	167	Wille Cullars	Defensive end	Kansas State
8	11	193	Robert Woods	Linebacker	Howard Payne
9	11	219	Mark Sheridan	Wide receiver	Holy Cross
10	11	245	Phil Polak	Running back	Bowling Green
11	11	271	Bill Brittain	Center	Kansas State
12	11	297	Artimus Parker	Safety	USC
13	11	323	Lars Ditlev	Defensive End	South Dakota Mines
14	11	349	Dave Smith	Linebacker	Oklahoma
15	11	375	Sid Bond	Tackle	TCU
16	11	401	Jim Smith	Linebacker	Monmouth
17	11	427	Cliff Brown	Quarterback	Notre Dame

== 1975 draft ==
Round	Pick #	Overall	Name	Position	College
7	11	167	Bill Capraun	Tackle	Miami (FL)
8	16	198	Jeff Bleamer	Tackle	Penn State
10	14	248	Ken Schroy	Safety	Maryland
11	13	273	Keith Rowen	Guard	Stanford
12	12	298	Richard Pawlewicz	Running back	William & Mary
13	11	323	Tom Ehlers	Linebacker	Kentucky
14	16	354	Larry O'Rourke	Defensive Tackle	Ohio State
15	15	379	Clayton Korver	Defensive end	Northwestern (IA)
16	14	404	Calvin Jones	Wide receiver	Texas Tech
17	13	429	Garry Webb	Defensive End	Temple

== 1976 draft ==
Round	Pick #	Overall	Name	Position	College
4	19	111	Mike Smith	Defensive end	Florida
5	11	135	Greg Johnson	Defensive End	Florida State
6	9	165	Kirk Johnson	Tackle	Howard Payne
7	9	191	Carl Hairston	Defensive End	Maryland-Eastern Shore
8	7	216	Richard LaFargue	Center	Arkansas
9	10	247	Mike Hogan	Running back	Tennessee-Chattanooga
9	11	248	Richard Osborne	Tight end	Texas A&M
10	8	273	Herb Lusk	Running Back	Long Beach State
11	9	300	Mike Gilbert	Defensive Tackle	San Diego State
13	6	353	Terry Tautolo	Linebacker	UCLA
13	11	358	Steve Ebbecke	Defensive Back	Wildcats
14	10	385	Melvin Shy	Defensive Back	Tennessee State
15	9	412	Brett White	Punter	UCLA
16	8	439	Steve Campassi	Running Back	Kentucky
17	11	470	Anthony Terry	Defensive Back	UC Davis

== 1977 draft ==
Round	Pick #	Overall	Name	Position	College
5	7	119	Skip Sharp	Defensive Back	Kansas
6	6	145	Kevin Russell	Defensive Back	Tennessee State
6	15	154	Wilbert Montgomery	Running back	Abilene Christian
6	19	158	Martin Mitchell	Defensive Back	Tulane
7	8	175	Charlie Johnson	Defensive Tackle	Colorado
8	7	202	Cleveland Franklin	Running Back	Baylor
9	6	229	T. J. Humphreys	Guard	Arkansas State
10	8	259	John Mastronardo	Wide receiver	Villanova
11	4	283	Rocco Moore	Guard	Western Michigan
11	7	286	Mike Cordova	Quarterback	Stanford

== 1978 draft ==
Round	Pick #	Overall	Name	Position	College
3	10	66	Reggie Wilkes	Linebacker	Georgia Tech
4	8	92	Dennis Harrison	Defensive end	Vanderbilt
5	20	130	Norris Banks	Running back	Kansas
7	20	186	Greg Marshall	Defensive Tackle	Oregon State
9	8	230	Charles Williams	Defensive Back	Jackson State
11	10	288	Billy Campfield	Running Back	Kansas
12	9	315	Mark Slater	Center	Minnesota

== 1979 draft ==
Round	Pick #	Overall	Name	Position	College
1	21	21	Jerry Robinson	Linebacker	UCLA
2	20	48	Petey Perot	Guard	Northwestern State
3	18	74	Tony Franklin	Kicker	Texas A&M
4	12	94	Ben Cowins	Running back	Arkansas
5	16	126	Scott Fitzkee	Wide receiver	Penn State
7	13	178	Don Swafford	Offensive tackle	Florida
7	20	185	Curtis Bunche	Defensive Tackle	Albany State
8	4	196	Chuck Correal	Center	Penn State
8	19	211	Max Runager	Punter	South Carolina
11	21	296	Al Chesley	Linebacker	Pittsburgh

== 1980 draft ==
Round	Pick #	Overall	Name	Position	College
1	23	23	Roynell Young	Safety	Alcorn State
2	25	53	Perry Harrington	Running back	Jackson State
5	25	135	Nate Rivers	Wide receiver	South Carolina State
6	23	161	Greg Murtha	Offensive tackle	Minnesota
7	23	188	Terrell Ward	Defensive Back	San Diego State
8	25	218	Mike Curcio	Linebacker	Temple
9	24	245	Bob Harris	Offensive Tackle	Bowling Green
11	21	298	Lee Jukes	Wide Receiver	North Carolina State
11	25	302	Thomas Brown	Defensive end	Baylor
12	24	329	Howard Fields	Cornerback	Baylor

== 1981 draft ==
Round	Pick #	Overall	Name	Position	College
1	27	27	Leonard Mitchell	Defensive end	Houston
2	27	55	Dean Miraldi	Guard	Utah
3	26	82	Greg LaFleur	Tight end	LSU
4	27	110	Calvin Murray	Running back	Ohio State
7	8	174	Alan Duncan	Kicker	Tennessee
7	26	192	Doak Field	Linebacker	Baylor
9	26	247	Chuck Commiskey	Guard	Ole Miss
10	27	275	Hubie Oliver	Running Back	Arizona
11	27	303	Gail Davis	Defensive Tackle	Virginia Union
12	27	331	Ray Ellis	Safety	Ohio State

== 1982 draft ==
Round	Pick #	Overall	Name	Position	College
1	20	20	Mike Quick	Wide receiver	North Carolina State
2	20	47	Lawrence Sampleton	Tight end	Texas
3	23	78	Vyto Kab	Tight End	Penn State
4	22	105	Anthony Griggs	Linebacker	Ohio State
5	21	132	Dennis DeVaughn	Defensive Back	Bishop
6	20	159	Curt Grieve	Wide Receiver	Yale
7	23	190	Harvey Armstrong	Defensive Tackle	SMU
8	22	217	Jim Fritzche	Offensive tackle	Purdue
9	21	244	Tony Woodruff	Wide Receiver	Fresno State
11	22	301	Ron Ingram	Wide Receiver	Oklahoma State
12	22	328	Rob Taylor	Offensive Tackle	Northwestern

== 1983 draft ==
Round	Pick #	Overall	Name	Position	College
1	8	8	Michael Haddix	Running back	Mississippi State
2	7	35	Wes Hopkins	Safety	SMU
2	18	46	Jody Schulz	Linebacker	East Carolina
3	6	62	Glen Young	Wide receiver	Mississippi State
4	5	89	Michael Williams	Running Back	Mississippi College
5	8	120	Byron Darby	Defensive end	USC
6	7	147	Victor Oatis	Wide Receiver	Northwestern State
7	6	174	Anthony Edgar	Running Back	Hawaii
7	14	182	John Schultheis	Guard	Princeton
8	5	201	Rich Kraynak	Linebacker	Pittsburgh
9	8	232	Rich Pelzer	Offensive tackle	Rhode Island
10	7	258	Thomas Strauthers	Defensive End	Jackson State
11	6	285	Steve Sebahar	Center	Washington State
12	5	312	David Mangrum	Quarterback	Baylor

== 1984 draft ==
Round	Pick #	Overall	Name	Position	College
1	4	4	Kenny Jackson	Wide receiver	Penn State
3	4	60	Rusty Russell	Offensive tackle	South Carolina
4	4	88	Evan Cooper	Defensive Back	Michigan
5	4	116	Andre Hardy	Running back	Saint Mary's
6	4	144	Scott Raridon	Offensive Tackle	Nebraska
7	4	172	Joe Hayes	Running Back	Central State (OK)
8	4	200	Manny Matsakis	Kicker	Capital
10	4	256	John Thomas	Defensive Back	TCU
11	4	284	John Robertson	Offensive Tackle	East Carolina
12	4	312	Paul McFadden	Kicker	Youngstown State

== 1984 NFL Supplemental Draft of USFL and CFL players ==
Round	Pick #	Overall	Name	Position	Pro Team	College
1	4	4	Reggie White	Defensive end	Memphis Showboats	Tennessee
2	4	32	Darryl Goodlow	Linebacker	Oklahoma Outlaws	Arizona
3	4	60	Thomas Carter	Linebacker	Oakland Invaders	San Diego State

== 1985 draft ==
Round	Pick #	Overall	Name	Position	College
1	9	9	Kevin Allen	Offensive tackle	Indiana
2	9	37	Randall Cunningham	Quarterback	UNLV
4	9	93	Greg Naron	Guard	North Carolina
5	9	121	Dwayne Jiles	Linebacker	Texas Tech
6	16	156	Ken Reeves	Offensive Tackle	Texas A&M
8	9	205	Tom Polley	Linebacker	UNLV
9	7	231	Dave Toub	Center	UTEP
9	9	233	Joe Drake	Defensive Tackle	Arizona
10	9	261	Mark Kelso	Safety	William & Mary
11	9	289	Herman Hunter	Running back	Tennessee State
12	9	317	Todd Russell	Defensive Back	Boston College

== 1986 draft ==
Round	Pick #	Overall	Name	Position	College
1	10	10	Keith Byars	Fullback	Ohio State
2	10	37	Anthony Toney	Running back	Texas A&M
2	21	48	Alonzo Johnson	Linebacker	Florida
4	24	106	Matt Darwin	Center	Texas A&M
5	11	121	Ray Criswell	Punter	Florida
6	11	149	Bob Landsee	Center	Wisconsin
7	3	169	Cornelius Redick	Wide receiver	Cal State Fullerton
7	10	176	Byron Lee	Linebacker	Ohio State
8	14	208	Seth Joyner	Linebacker	UTEP
9	12	233	Clyde Simmons	Defensive end	Western Carolina
10	12	261	Junior Tautalatasi	Running Back	Washington State
11	11	288	Steve Bogdalek	Guard	Michigan State
12	10	315	Reggie Singletary	Defensive end	North Carolina State
12	20	325	Bobby Howard	Running Back	Indiana

== 1987 draft ==
Round	Pick #	Overall	Name	Position	College
1	9	9	Jerome Brown	Defensive Tackle	Miami (FL)
3	9	65	Ben Tamburello	Center	Auburn
4	9	93	Byron Evans	Linebacker	Arizona
5	9	121	David Alexander	Center	Tulsa
6	9	149	Ron Moten	Linebacker	Florida
6	18	158	Chris Pike	Defensive Tackle	Tulsa
7	9	177	Brian Williams	Offensive tackle	Central Michigan
9	9	232	Ken Lambiotte	Quarterback	William & Mary
10	9	260	Paul Carberry	Defensive Tackle	Oregon State
12	9	316	Bobby Morse	Running back	Michigan State

== 1988 draft ==
Round	Pick #	Overall	Name	Position	College
1	13	13	Keith Jackson	Tight end	Oklahoma
2	3	30	Eric Allen	Cornerback	Arizona State
3	9	64	Matt Patchan	Offensive tackle	Miami (FL)
5	13	122	Eric Everett	Cornerback	Texas Tech
6	12	149	Don McPherson	Quarterback	Syracuse
6	23	160	Rob Sterling	Defensive Back	Maine
7	11	176	Todd White	Wide receiver	Cal State Fullerton
8	14	207	David Smith	Running back	Western Kentucky
10	12	261	Joe Schuster	Defensive Tackle	Iowa
11	11	288	Izel Jenkins	Defensive Back	North Carolina State
12	14	319	Steve Kaufusi	Defensive end	BYU

== 1989 draft ==
Round	Pick #	Overall	Name	Position	College
2	21	49	Jessie Small	Linebacker	Eastern Kentucky
3	20	76	Robert Drummond	Running back	Syracuse
3	25	81	Britt Hager	Linebacker	Texas
6	23	162	Heath Sherman	Running Back	Texas A&I

== 1990 draft ==
Round	Pick #	Overall	Name	Position	College
1	22	22	Ben Smith	Cornerback	Georgia
2	25	50	Mike Bellamy	Wide receiver	Illinois
3	24	77	Fred Barnett	Wide Receiver	Arkansas State
5	24	133	Calvin Williams	Wide Receiver	Purdue
6	25	162	Kevin Thompson	Defensive Back	Oklahoma
7	24	189	Terry Strouf	Offensive tackle	Wisconsin-La Crosse
8	24	217	Curt Dykes	Offensive Tackle	Oregon
9	24	244	Cecil Gray	Offensive Tackle	North Carolina
10	25	273	Orlando Adams	Defensive Tackle	Jacksonville State
11	18	294	John Hudson	Guard	Auburn
11	24	300	Tyrone Watson	Wide Receiver	Tennessee State
12	23	327	Judd Garrett	Running back	Princeton

== 1991 draft ==
Round	Pick #	Overall	Name	Position	College
1	8	8	Antone Davis	Offensive tackle	Tennessee
2	21	48	Jesse Campbell	Safety	North Carolina State
3	20	75	Rob Selby	Guard	Auburn
4	21	104	William Thomas	Linebacker	Texas A&M
5	20	131	Craig Erickson	Quarterback	Miami (FL)
6	17	156	Andy Harmon	Defensive Tackle	Kent State
7	20	187	James Joseph	Running back	Auburn
8	21	216	Scott Kowalkowski	Linebacker	Notre Dame
9	19	242	Chuck Weatherspoon	Running Back	Houston
10	21	271	Eric Harmon	Guard	Clemson
11	20	298	Mike Flores	Defensive end	Louisville
12	21	327	Darrell Beavers	Defensive Back	Morehead State

== 1992 draft ==
Round	Pick #	Overall	Name	Position	College
2	20	48	Siran Stacy	Running back	Alabama
3	19	75	Tommy Jeter	Defensive Tackle	Texas
4	8	92	Tony Brooks	Running Back	Notre Dame
4	18	102	Casey Weldon	Quarterback	Florida State
5	17	125	Corey Barlow	Defensive Back	Auburn
6	20	160	Jeff Sydner	Wide receiver	Hawaii
7	19	187	William Boatwright	Guard	Virginia Tech
8	18	214	Chuck Bullough	Linebacker	Michigan State
9	17	241	Ephesians Bartley	Linebacker	Florida
10	20	272	Mark McMillian	Cornerback	Alabama
11	19	299	Pumpy Tudors	Punter	Tennessee-Chattanooga
12	18	326	Brandon Houston	Offensive tackle	Oklahoma

== 1993 draft ==
Round	Pick #	Overall	Name	Position	College
1	19	19	Lester Holmes	Guard	Jackson State
1	24	24	Leonard Renfro	Defensive Tackle	Colorado
2	21	50	Victor Bailey	Wide receiver	Missouri
3	19	75	Derrick Frazier	Cornerback	Texas A&M
3	21	77	Mike Reid	Defensive Back	North Carolina State
6	23	163	Derrick Oden	Linebacker	Alabama
7	22	190	Joey Mickey	Tight end	Oklahoma
8	21	217	Doug Skene	Guard	Michigan

== 1994 draft ==
Round	Pick #	Overall	Name	Position	College
1	14	14	Bernard Williams	Offensive tackle	Georgia
2	8	37	Bruce Walker	Defensive Tackle	UCLA
2	13	42	Charlie Garner	Running back	Tennessee
3	12	77	Joe Panos	Guard	Wisconsin
3	38	103	Eric Zomalt	Safety	California
5	13	144	Marvin Goodwin	Defensive Back	UCLA
6	13	174	Ryan McCoy	Linebacker	Houston
6	32	193	Mitch Berger	Punter	Colorado
7	12	206	Mark Montgomery	Running Back	Wisconsin

== 1995 draft ==
Round	Pick #	Overall	Name	Position	College
1	7	7	Mike Mamula	Defensive end	Boston College
2	18	50	Bobby Taylor	Cornerback	Notre Dame
2	26	58	Barrett Brooks	Offensive tackle	Kansas State
3	8	72	Greg Jefferson	Defensive End	Central Florida
3	14	78	Chris T. Jones	Wide receiver	Miami (FL)
4	21	119	Dave Barr	Quarterback	California
6	36	208	Fred McCrary	Fullback	Mississippi State
7	2	210	Kevin Bouie	Running back	Mississippi State
7	40	248	Howard Smothers	Offensive Tackle	Bethune-Cookman

== 1996 draft ==
Round	Pick #	Overall	Name	Position	College
1	25	25	Jermane Mayberry	Guard	Texas A&M–Kingsville
2	24	54	Jason Dunn	Tight end	Eastern Kentucky
2	31	61	Brian Dawkins	Safety	Clemson
3	24	85	Bobby Hoying	Quarterback	Ohio State
4	26	121	Ray Farmer	Linebacker	Duke
5	15	147	Whit Marshall	Linebacker	Georgia
6	27	194	Steve White	Defensive end	Tennessee
6	30	197	Tony Johnson	Tight End	Alabama

== 1997 draft ==
Round	Pick #	Overall	Name	Position	College
1	25	25	Jon Harris	Defensive end	Virginia
2	27	57	James Darling	Linebacker	Washington State
3	11	71	Duce Staley	Running back	South Carolina
4	23	119	Damien Robinson	Safety	Iowa
5	22	152	N. D. Kalu	Defensive End	Rice
5	25	155	Luther Broughton	Tight end	Furman
6	27	190	Antwuan Wyatt	Wide receiver	Bethune-Cookman
6	35	198	Ed Jasper	Defensive Tackle	Texas A&M
7	6	207	Koy Detmer	Quarterback	Colorado
7	24	225	Byron Capers	Defensive Back	Florida State
7	26	227	DeAuntae Brown	Defensive Back	Central State (OH)

== 1998 draft ==
Round	Pick #	Overall	Name	Position	College
1	11	11	Tra Thomas	Offensive tackle	Florida State
3	11	72	Jeremiah Trotter	Linebacker	Stephen F. Austin
3	24	85	Allen Rossum	Cornerback	Notre Dame
4	20	112	Brandon Whiting	Defensive end	California
4	24	116	Clarence Love	Safety	Toledo
5	19	142	Ike Reese	Linebacker	Michigan State
7	31	220	Chris Akins	Defensive Tackle	Texas
7	51	240	Melvin Thomas	Guard	Colorado

== 1999 draft ==
Round	Pick #	Overall	Name	Position	College
1	2	2	Donovan McNabb	Quarterback	Syracuse
2	4	35	Barry Gardner	Linebacker	Northwestern
3	3	64	Doug Brzezinski	Guard	Boston College
4	2	97	John Welbourn	Guard	California
4	33	128	Damon Moore	Safety	Ohio State
4	35	130	Na Brown	Wide receiver	North Carolina
6	3	172	Cecil Martin	Fullback	Wisconsin
6	32	201	Troy Smith	Wide Receiver	East Carolina
7	2	208	Jed Weaver	Tight end	Oregon
7	45	251	Pernell Davis	Defensive Tackle	UAB

== 2000 draft ==
Round	Pick #	Overall	Name	Position	College
1	6	6	Corey Simon	Defensive Tackle	Florida State
2	5	36	Todd Pinkston	Wide receiver	Southern Miss
2	30	61	Bobbie Williams	Guard	Arkansas
4	5	99	Gari Scott	Wide Receiver	Michigan State
6	5	171	Thomas Hamner	Running back	Minnesota
6	12	178	John Frank	Defensive end	Utah
6	26	192	John Romero	Center	California

== 2001 draft ==
Round	Pick #	Overall	Name	Position	College
1	25	25	Freddie Mitchell	Wide receiver	UCLA
2	24	55	Quinton Caver	Linebacker	Arkansas
3	1	63	Derrick Burgess	Defensive end	Ole Miss
4	26	121	Correll Buckhalter	Running back	Nebraska
5	16	147	Tony Stewart	Tight end	Penn State
5	24	155	A. J. Feeley	Quarterback	Oregon

== 2002 draft ==
Round	Pick #	Overall	Name	Position	College
1	26	26	Lito Sheppard	Cornerback	Florida
2	26	58	Michael Lewis	Safety	Colorado
2	27	59	Sheldon Brown	Cornerback	South Carolina
3	26	91	Brian Westbrook	Running back	Villanova
4	26	124	Scott Peters	Center	Arizona State
5	27	162	Freddie Milons	Wide receiver	Alabama
6	26	198	Tyreo Harrison	Linebacker	Notre Dame
7	27	238	Raheem Brock	Defensive end	Temple

== 2003 draft ==
Round	Pick #	Overall	Name	Position	College
1	15	15	Jerome McDougle	Defensive end	Miami (FL)
2	29	61	L. J. Smith	Tight end	Rutgers
3	31	95	Billy McMullen	Wide receiver	Virginia
4	34	131	Jamaal Green	Defensive End	Miami (FL)
6	12	185	Jeremy Bridges	Guard	Southern Miss
7	30	244	Norman LeJeune	Safety	LSU

== 2004 draft ==
Round	Pick #	Overall	Name	Position	College
1	16	16	Shawn Andrews	Offensive tackle	Arkansas
3	26	89	Matt Ware	Safety	UCLA
4	33	129	J. R. Reed	Safety	South Florida
4	35	131	Trey Darilek	Guard	UTEP
5	30	162	Thomas Tapeh	Fullback	Minnesota
6	20	185	Andy Hall	Quarterback	Delaware
6	27	192	Dexter Wynn	Cornerback	Colorado State
7	26	227	Adrien Clarke	Guard	Ohio State
7	41	242	Bruce Perry	Running back	Maryland
7	42	243	Dominic Furio	Center	UNLV

== 2005 draft ==
Round	Pick #	Overall	Name	Position	College
1	31	31	Mike Patterson	Defensive Tackle	USC
2	3	35	Reggie Brown	Wide receiver	Georgia
2	31	63	Matt McCoy	Linebacker	San Diego State
3	13	77	Ryan Moats	Running back	Louisiana Tech
4	1	102	Sean Considine	Safety	Iowa
4	25	126	Todd Herremans	Guard	Saginaw Valley State
5	10	146	Trent Cole	Linebacker	Cincinnati
5	36	142	Scott Young	Guard	BYU
6	37	211	Calvin Armstrong	Offensive tackle	Washington State
7	33	247	Keyonta Marshall	Defensive Tackle	Grand Valley State
7	38	252	David Bergeron	Linebacker	Stanford

== 2006 draft ==
Round	Pick #	Overall	Name	Position	College
1	14	14	Brodrick Bunkley	Defensive Tackle	Florida State
2	7	39	Winston Justice	Offensive tackle	USC
3	7	71	Chris Gocong	Linebacker	Cal Poly
4	2	99	Max Jean-Gilles	Guard	Georgia
4	12	109	Jason Avant	Wide receiver	Michigan
5	14	147	Jeremy Bloom	Wide Receiver	Colorado
5	36	168	Omar Gaither	Linebacker	Tennessee
6	35	204	LaJuan Ramsey	Defensive Tackle	USC

== 2007 draft ==
Round	Pick #	Overall	Name	Position	College
2	4	36	Kevin Kolb	Quarterback	Houston
2	25	57	Victor Abiamiri	Defensive end	Notre Dame
3	24	87	Stewart Bradley	Linebacker	Nebraska
3	27	90	Tony Hunt	Running back	Penn State
5	22	159	C. J. Gaddis	Safety	Clemson
5	25	162	Brent Celek	Tight end	Cincinnati
6	27	201	Rashad Barksdale	Cornerback	Albany
7	26	236	Nate Ilaoa	Running Back	Hawaii

== 2008 draft ==
Round	Pick #	Overall	Name	Position	College
2	16	47	Trevor Laws	Defensive Tackle	Notre Dame
2	18	49	DeSean Jackson	Wide receiver	California
3	17	80	Bryan Smith	Linebacker	McNeese State
4	10	109	Mike McGlynn	Guard	Pittsburgh
4	18	117	Quintin Demps	Safety	UTEP
4	32	131	Jack Ikegwuonu	Cornerback	Wisconsin
6	18	184	Mike Gibson	Guard	California
6	34	200	Joe Mays	Linebacker	North Dakota State
6	37	203	Andy Studebaker	Linebacker	Wheaton
7	23	230	King Dunlap	Offensive tackle	Auburn

== 2009 draft ==
Round	Pick #	Overall	Name	Position	College
1	19	19	Jeremy Maclin	Wide receiver	Missouri
2	21	53	LeSean McCoy	Running back	Pittsburgh
5	17	153	Cornelius Ingram	Tight end	Florida
5	21	157	Macho Harris	Cornerback	Virginia Tech
5	23	159	Fenuki Tupou	Guard	Oregon
6	21	194	Brandon Gibson	Wide Receiver	Washington State
7	4	213	Paul Fanaika	Guard	Arizona State
7	21	230	Moise Fokou	Linebacker	Maryland

== 2010 draft ==
Round	Pick #	Overall	Name	Position	College
1	13	13	Brandon Graham	Defensive end	Michigan
2	5	37	Nate Allen	Safety	South Florida
3	22	86	Daniel Te'o-Nesheim	Defensive End	Washington
4	7	105	Trevard Lindley	Cornerback	Kentucky
4	23	121	Keenan Clayton	Linebacker	Oklahoma
4	24	122	Mike Kafka	Quarterback	Northwestern
4	27	125	Clay Harbor	Tight end	Missouri State
5	3	134	Ricky Sapp	Linebacker	Clemson
5	28	159	Riley Cooper	Wide receiver	Florida
6	31	200	Charles Scott	Running back	LSU
7	13	220	Jamar Chaney	Linebacker	Mississippi State
7	36	243	Jeff Owens	Defensive Tackle	Georgia
7	37	244	Kurt Coleman	Safety	Ohio State

== 2011 draft ==
Round	Pick #	Overall	Name	Position	College
1	23	23	Danny Watkins	Guard	Baylor
2	22	54	Jaiquawn Jarrett	Safety	Temple
3	26	90	Curtis Marsh Jr.	Cornerback	Utah State
4	19	116	Casey Matthews	Linebacker	Oregon
4	23	120	Alex Henery	Kicker	Nebraska
5	18	149	Dion Lewis	Running back	Pittsburgh
5	30	161	Julian Vandervelde	Center	Iowa
6	26	191	Jason Kelce	Center	Cincinnati
6	28	193	Brian Rolle	Linebacker	Ohio State
7	34	237	Greg Lloyd Jr.	Linebacker	Connecticut
7	37	240	Stanley Havili	Fullback	USC

== 2012 draft ==
Round	Pick #	Overall	Name	Position	College
1	12	12	Fletcher Cox	Defensive Tackle	Mississippi State
2	14	46	Mychal Kendricks	Linebacker	California
2	27	59	Vinny Curry	Defensive end	Marshall
3	25	88	Nick Foles	Quarterback	Arizona
4	28	123	Brandon Boykin	Cornerback	Georgia
5	18	153	Dennis Kelly	Offensive tackle	Purdue
6	24	194	Marvin McNutt	Wide receiver	Iowa
6	30	200	Brandon Washington	Offensive Tackle	Miami (FL)
7	22	229	Bryce Brown	Running back	Kansas State

== 2013 draft ==
Round	Pick #	Overall	Name	Position	College
1	4	4	Lane Johnson	Offensive tackle	Oklahoma
2	3	35	Zach Ertz	Tight end	Stanford
3	5	67	Bennie Logan	Defensive Tackle	LSU
4	1	98	Matt Barkley	Quarterback	USC
5	3	136	Earl Wolff	Safety	North Carolina State
7	6	212	Joe Kruger	Defensive end	Utah
7	12	218	Jordan Poyer	Safety	Oregon State
7	33	239	David King	Defensive End	Oklahoma

== 2014 draft ==
Round	Pick #	Overall	Name	Position	College
1	26	26	Marcus Smith II	Defensive end	Louisville
2	10	42	Jordan Matthews	Wide receiver	Vanderbilt
3	22	86	Josh Huff	Wide Receiver	Oregon
4	1	101	Jaylen Watkins	Safety	Florida
5	1	141	Taylor Hart	Offensive tackle	Oregon
5	22	162	Ed Reynolds	Safety	Stanford
7	9	224	Beau Allen	Defensive Tackle	Wisconsin

== 2015 draft ==
Round	Pick #	Overall	Name	Position	College
1	20	20	Nelson Agholor	Wide receiver	USC
2	15	47	Eric Rowe	Cornerback	Utah
3	20	84	Jordan Hicks	Linebacker	Texas
6	15	191	JaCorey Shepherd	Cornerback	Kansas
6	20	196	Randall Evans	Cornerback	Kansas State
7	20	237	Brian Mihalik	Offensive tackle	Boston College

== 2016 draft ==
Round	Pick #	Overall	Name	Position	College
1	2	2	Carson Wentz	Quarterback	North Dakota State
3	16	79	Isaac Seumalo	Guard	Oregon State
5	14	153	Wendell Smallwood	Running back	West Virginia
5	27	164	Halapoulivaati Vaitai	Offensive tackle	TCU
6	21	196	Blake Countess	Safety	Auburn
7	12	233	Jalen Mills	Cornerback	LSU
7	19	240	Alex McCalister	Linebacker	Florida
7	30	251	Joe Walker	Linebacker	Oregon

== 2017 draft ==
Round	Pick #	Overall	Name	Position	College
1	14	14	Derek Barnett	Defensive end	Tennessee
2	11	43	Sidney Jones	Cornerback	Washington
3	35	99	Rasul Douglas	Cornerback	West Virginia
4	12	118	Mack Hollins	Wide receiver	North Carolina
4	26	132	Donnel Pumphrey	Running back	San Diego State
5	22	166	Shelton Gibson	Wide Receiver	West Virginia
5	41	184	Nathan Gerry	Linebacker	Nebraska
6	31	214	Elijah Qualls	Defensive Tackle	Washington

== 2018 draft ==
Round	Pick #	Overall	Name	Position	College
2	17	49	Dallas Goedert	Tight end	South Dakota State
4	25	125	Avonte Maddox	Cornerback	Pittsburgh
4	30	130	Josh Sweat	Defensive end	Florida State
6	32	206	Matt Pryor	Offensive tackle	TCU
7	15	233	Jordan Mailata	Offensive Tackle	N/A

== 2019 draft ==
Round	Pick #	Overall	Name	Position	College
1	22	22	Andre Dillard	Offensive tackle	Washington State
2	21	53	Miles Sanders	Running back	Penn State
2	25	57	J. J. Arcega-Whiteside	Wide receiver	Stanford
4	36	138	Shareef Miller	Defensive end	Penn State
5	29	167	Clayton Thorson	Quarterback	Northwestern

== 2020 draft ==
Round	Pick #	Overall	Name	Position	College
1	21	21	Jalen Reagor	Wide receiver	TCU
2	21	53	Jalen Hurts	Quarterback	Oklahoma
3	39	103	Davion Taylor	Linebacker	Colorado
4	21	127	K'Von Wallace	Safety	Clemson
4	39	145	Jack Driscoll	Offensive tackle	Auburn
5	23	168	John Hightower	Wide Receiver	Boise State
6	17	196	Shaun Bradley	Linebacker	Temple
6	21	200	Quez Watkins	Wide receiver	Southern Miss
6	31	210	Prince Tega Wanogho	Offensive tackle	Auburn
7	19	233	Casey Toohill	Linebacker	Stanford

== 2021 draft ==
Round	Pick #	Overall	Name	Position	College
1	10	10	DeVonta Smith	Wide receiver	Alabama
2	5	37	Landon Dickerson	Center	Alabama
3	6	70	Milton Williams	Defensive tackle	Louisiana Tech
4	18	123	Zech McPhearson	Cornerback	Texas Tech
5	6	150	Kenneth Gainwell	Running back	Memphis
6	5	189	Marlon Tuipulotu	Defensive tackle	USC
6	7	191	Tarron Jackson	Defensive end	Coastal Carolina
6	40	224	JaCoby Stevens	Safety	LSU
7	6	234	Patrick Johnson	Defensive end	Tulane

== 2022 draft ==
Round	Pick #	Overall	Name	Position	College
1	13	13	Jordan Davis	Defensive tackle	Georgia
2	19	51	Cam Jurgens	Center	Nebraska
3	19	83	Nakobe Dean	Linebacker	Georgia
6	1	181	Kyron Johnson	Defensive end	Kansas
6	20	198	Grant Calcaterra	Tight end	SMU

== 2023 draft ==
Round	Pick #	Overall	Name	Position	College
1	9	9	Jalen Carter	Defensive tackle	Georgia
1	30	30	Nolan Smith	Linebacker	Georgia
3	2	65	Tyler Steen	Offensive tackle	Alabama
3	3	66	Sydney Brown	Safety	Illinois
4	3	105	Kelee Ringo	Cornerback	Georgia
6	11	188	Tanner McKee	Quarterback	Stanford
7	32	249	Moro Ojomo	Defensive tackle	Texas

== 2024 draft ==
Round	Pick #	Overall	Name	Position	College
1	22	22	Quinyon Mitchell	Cornerback	Toledo
2	8	40	Cooper DeJean	Defensive back	Iowa
3	31	94	Jalyx Hunt	Defensive end	Houston Christian
4	27	127	Will Shipley	Running back	Clemson
5	17	152	Ainias Smith	Wide receiver	Texas A&M
5	20	155	Jeremiah Trotter Jr.	Linebacker	Clemson
5	37	172	Trevor Keegan	Guard	Michigan
6	9	185	Johnny Wilson	Wide receiver	Florida State
6	14	190	Dylan McMahon	Center	NC State

== 2025 draft ==
Round	Pick #	Overall	Name	Position	College
1	31	31	Jihaad Campbell	Linebacker	Alabama
2	32	64	Andrew Mukuba	Safety	Texas
4	9	111	Ty Robinson	Defensive tackle	Nebraska
5	7	145	Mac McWilliams	Cornerback	UCF
5	25	161	Smael Mondon Jr.	Linebacker	Georgia
5	32	168	Drew Kendall	Center	Boston College
6	5	181	Kyle McCord	Quarterback	Syracuse
6	15	191	Myles Hinton	Offensive tackle	Michigan
6	31	207	Cameron Williams	Offensive tackle	Texas
6	33	209	Antwaun Powell-Ryland	Defensive end	Virginia Tech

== 2026 draft ==
Round	Pick #	Overall	Name	Position	College
1	20	20	Makai Lemon	Wide receiver	USC
2	22	54	Eli Stowers	Tight end	Vanderbilt
3	4	68	Markel Bell	Offensive tackle	Miami
5	38	178	Cole Payton	Quarterback	North Dakota State
6	26	207	Micah Morris	Guard	Georgia
7	28	244	Cole Wisniewski	Safety	Texas Tech
7	35	251	Uar Bernard	Defensive tackle	N/A
7	36	252	Keyshawn James-Newby	Defensive end	New Mexico
