= 2000 Philadelphia Eagles season =

68th season in franchise history; first playoff appearance since 1996

- Owner: Jeffrey Lurie
- Head coach: Andy Reid
- Offensive coordinator: Rod Dowhower
- Defensive coordinator: Jim Johnson
- Home stadium: Veterans Stadium

Results
- Record: 11–5
- Division place: 2nd NFC East
- Playoffs: Won Wild Card Playoffs (vs. Buccaneers) 21–3; Lost Divisional Playoffs (at Giants) 10–20
- Pro Bowlers: 5

The 2000 season was the Philadelphia Eagles' sixty-eighth in the National Football League (NFL) and its second under head coach Andy Reid.

The team improved on its 5–11 record from 1999, resulting in a postseason appearance for the first time since 1996.

Its season started in Dallas, with the game famously known for the onside kick that the Eagles kicked and recovered to start the game. This game is known as the Pickle Juice Game, as the Philadelphia players were given pickle juice by Andy Reid in order to prepare for the high temperature in Dallas that day. The Eagles won the game, 41–14.

This was Donovan McNabb's first full year as starting quarterback after seeing limited action during his rookie season. With McNabb, the team posted an 11–5 record. For his efforts, McNabb was named to the Pro Bowl following the season. He subsequently made several more Pro Bowl appearances during his time in Philadelphia. The Eagles played in five NFC Championship games and a Super Bowl (2004) during the McNabb era.

The Eagles easily defeated the Tampa Bay Buccaneers in the wild-card round of the playoffs, 21–3, but lost to its rivals, the eventual NFC champion New York Giants, in the divisional round 20–10.

In week five, running back Duce Staley broke his foot. He was later placed on injured reserve, ending his season. He rushed for 344 yards while active in five games.

== Offseason ==
=== NFL draft ===
The 2000 NFL draft was held April 15–16, 2000. No teams elected to claim any players in the supplemental draft that year. The Eagles held the sixth pick in the seven-round draft and made a total of seven selections.

=== Player selections ===
The table below shows the Eagles selections, what picks it had that were traded away, and the teams that ended up with those picks. (It is possible that Eagles' picks ended up with those teams via other trades made by the Eagles with other teams.) Not shown are acquired picks that the Eagles traded away.

| = Pro Bowler | = Hall of Famer |

2000 Philadelphia Eagles Draft
| Round | Selection | Player | Position | College | Notes |
|---|---|---|---|---|---|
| 1 | 6 | Corey Simon | DT | Florida State | |
| 2 | 36 | Todd Pinkston | WR | Southern Miss | |
| 2 | 61 | Bobbie Williams | G | Arkansas | From Tennessee |
| 3 | 68 | Traded to Tennessee | | | |
| 4 | 99 | Gari Scott | WR | Michigan State | |
| 5 | 135 | Traded to Tennessee | | | |
| 6 | 171 | Thomas Hamner | RB | Minnesota | |
| 6 | 178 | John Frank | DE | Utah | from Oakland |
| 6 | 192 | John Romero | C | California | from Washington |
| 7 | 240 | Traded to New England | | | |

== Staff ==
2000 Philadelphia Eagles staff
| Front office: President/Chief Executive Officer – Jeffrey Lurie; Executive vice president/chief operating officer – Joe Banner; Director of football operations – Tom Modrak; Director of college scouting – John Goeller; Director of pro personnel – Mike McCartney; Head coaches: Head coach – Andy Reid; Assistant to the head coach – Sean McDermott; Offensive coaches: Offensive coordinator – Rod Dowhower; Quarterbacks – Brad Childress; Running backs – Ted Williams; Wide receivers – David Culley; Tight ends/offensive line – Pat Shurmur; Offensive line – Juan Castillo; Offensive assistant/quality control – Tom Melvin | Defensive coaches: Defensive coordinator – Jim Johnson; Defensive line – Tommy Brasher; Linebackers – Ron Rivera; Defensive backs – Leslie Frazier; Defensive assistant – Steve Spagnuolo; Special teams coaches: Special teams coordinator – John Harbaugh; Strength and conditioning: Head athletic trainer – Rick Burkholder; Strength and conditioning – Mike Wolf; Assistant strength and conditioning – Tom Kanavy; Volunteer assistant strength and conditioning – Chris DiSanto; Assistant trainer – Eric Sugarman |

== Roster ==
Philadelphia Eagles 2000 final roster
| Quarterbacks: 10 Koy Detmer; 5 Donovan McNabb; 11 Ron Powlus; Running backs: 24 Darnell Autry; 33 Thomas Hamner; 38 Cecil Martin FB; 30 Brian Mitchell RS; 36 Stanley Pritchett FB; 35 Chris Warren; Wide receivers: 85 Na Brown; 82 Dameane Douglas; 81 Charles Johnson; 87 Todd Pinkston; 86 Gari Scott; 80 Torrance Small; Tight ends: 84 Luther Broughton; 89 Chad Lewis; 83 Jeff Thomason | Offensive linemen: 74 Doug Brzezinski G; 63 Hank Fraley C; 71 Jermane Mayberry G; 65 Bubba Miller C; 69 Jon Runyan T; 67 Ryan Schau G/T; 72 Tra Thomas T; 76 John Welbourn G; 66 Bobbie Williams G; Defensive linemen: 53 Hugh Douglas DE; 96 Paul Grasmanis DT; 91 Uhuru Hamiter DE; 59 Mike Mamula DE; 90 Corey Simon DT; 78 Hollis Thomas DT; 97 Darwin Walker DT; 98 Brandon Whiting DE | Linebackers: 56 Mike Caldwell OLB; 57 James Darling MLB; 51 Carlos Emmons OLB; 52 Barry Gardner OLB; 58 Ike Reese OLB; 54 Jeremiah Trotter MLB; Defensive backs: 32 Jason Bostic CB; 25 Je'Rod Cherry SS; 42 Rashard Cook FS; 20 Brian Dawkins FS; 31 Al Harris CB; 45 Tim Hauck FS; 43 Damon Moore SS; 21 Bobby Taylor CB; 23 Troy Vincent CB; Special teams: 2 David Akers K; 88 Mike Bartrum LS; 7 Sean Landeta P | Reserve lists: 93 Pernell Davis DT (NF-Inj.); 79 Greg Jefferson DE (IR); 61 Giradie Mercer DT (IR); 22 Duce Staley RB (IR); Practice squad: 41 William Hampton CB; 62 Dwight Johnson DE; 64 John Romero C; 75 Paul Snellings T; 13 Elijah Thurmon WR; rookies in italics 53 active, 4 inactive, 5 practice squad |

== Preseason ==
| Week | Date | Opponent | Result | Record | Venue |
|---|---|---|---|---|---|
| 1 | July 30 | at Cleveland Browns | L 22–33 | 0–1 | Cleveland Browns Stadium |
| 2 | August 5 | at Baltimore Ravens | L 13–16 | 0–2 | PSINet Stadium |
| 3 | August 18 | Tennessee Titans | W 34–32 | 1–2 | Veterans Stadium |
| 4 | August 24 | Buffalo Bills | L 12–16 | 1–3 | Veterans Stadium |

== Regular season ==
=== Schedule ===
| Week | Date | Opponent | Result | Record | Venue | Recap |
|---|---|---|---|---|---|---|
| 1 | September 3 | at **Dallas Cowboys** | **W** 41–14 | 1–0 | Texas Stadium | Recap |
| 2 | September 10 | **New York Giants** | **L** 18–33 | 1–1 | Veterans Stadium | Recap |
| 3 | September 17 | at Green Bay Packers | **L** 3–6 | 1–2 | Lambeau Field | Recap |
| 4 | September 24 | at New Orleans Saints | **W** 21–7 | 2–2 | Louisiana Superdome | Recap |
| 5 | October 1 | Atlanta Falcons | **W** 38–10 | 3–2 | Veterans Stadium | Recap |
| 6 | October 8 | **Washington Redskins** | **L** 14–17 | 3–3 | Veterans Stadium | Recap |
| 7 | October 15 | at **Arizona Cardinals** | **W** 33–14 | 4–3 | Sun Devil Stadium | Recap |
| 8 | October 22 | Chicago Bears | **W** 13–9 | 5–3 | Veterans Stadium | Recap |
| 9 | October 29 | at **New York Giants** | **L** 7–24 | 5–4 | Giants Stadium | Recap |
| 10 | November 5 | **Dallas Cowboys** | **W** 16–13 (OT) | 6–4 | Veterans Stadium | Recap |
| 11 | November 12 | at Pittsburgh Steelers | **W** 26–23 (OT) | 7–4 | Three Rivers Stadium | Recap |
| 12 | November 19 | **Arizona Cardinals** | **W** 34–9 | 8–4 | Veterans Stadium | Recap |
| 13 | November 26 | at **Washington Redskins** | **W** 23–20 | 9–4 | FedExField | Recap |
| 14 | December 3 | Tennessee Titans | **L** 13–15 | 9–5 | Veterans Stadium | Recap |
| 15 | December 10 | at Cleveland Browns | **W** 35–24 | 10–5 | Cleveland Browns Stadium | Recap |
| 16 | Bye | | | | | |
| 17 | December 24 | Cincinnati Bengals | **W** 16–7 | 11–5 | Veterans Stadium | Recap |

Note: Intra-division opponents are in bold text.

=== Standings ===
NFC East
| | W | L | T | PCT | PF | PA | STK |
|---|---|---|---|---|---|---|---|
| ^{(1)} New York Giants | 12 | 4 | 0 | .750 | 328 | 246 | W5 |
| ^{(4)} Philadelphia Eagles | 11 | 5 | 0 | .688 | 351 | 245 | W2 |
| Washington Redskins | 8 | 8 | 0 | .500 | 281 | 269 | W1 |
| Dallas Cowboys | 5 | 11 | 0 | .313 | 294 | 361 | L2 |
| Arizona Cardinals | 3 | 13 | 0 | .188 | 210 | 443 | L7 |

== Postseason ==
=== Schedule ===
| Round | Date | Opponent (seed) | Result | Record | Venue | Recap |
|---|---|---|---|---|---|---|
| Wild Card | December 31, 2000 | Tampa Bay Buccaneers (5) | W 21–3 | 1–0 | Veterans Stadium | Recap |
| Divisional | January 7, 2001 | at New York Giants (1) | L 10–20 | 1–1 | Giants Stadium | Recap |

=== Game summaries ===
==== NFC Wild Card Playoffs: vs. (5) Tampa Bay Buccaneers ====
NFC Wild Card Playoffs: (5) Tampa Bay Buccaneers at (4) Philadelphia Eagles – Game summary

| Quarter | 1 | 2 | 3 | 4 | Total |
|---|---|---|---|---|---|
| Buccaneers | 0 | 3 | 0 | 0 | 3 |
| Eagles | 0 | 14 | 0 | 7 | 21 |

at Veterans Stadium, Philadelphia, Pennsylvania

- Date: December 31, 2000
- Game time: 4:00 p.m. EST
- Game weather: 35 °F (2 °C), cloudy
- Game attendance: 65,813
- Referee: Mike Carey
- TV announcers (Fox): Pat Summerall (play-by-play), John Madden (color commentator), and D. J. Johnson (sideline reporter)

Game information

First quarter

- No scoring plays.

Second quarter

- TB – Martín Gramática 29-yard field goal, 10:16. Buccaneers 3–0. Drive: 8 plays, 58 yards, 3:49.
- PHI – Donovan McNabb 5-yard run (David Akers kick), 3:21. Eagles 7–3. Drive: 4 plays, 15 yards, 0:59.
- PHI – Na Brown 5-yard pass from Donovan McNabb (David Akers kick), 0:12. Eagles 14–3. Drive: 8 plays, 69 yards, 1:31.

Third quarter

- No scoring plays.

Fourth quarter

- PHI – Jeff Thomason 2-yard pass from Donovan McNabb (David Akers kick), 14:13. Eagles 21–3. Drive: 9 plays, 57 yards, 5:20.

Top passers

- TB – Shaun King – 17/31, 171 yards
- PHI – Donovan McNabb – 24/33, 161 yards, 2 TD, INT

Top rushers

- TB – Mike Alstott – 7 rushes, 42 yards
- PHI – Chris Warren – 22 rushes, 85 yards

Top receivers

- TB – Keyshawn Johnson – 6 receptions, 106 yards
- PHI – Charles Johnson – 5 receptions, 47 yards

==== NFC Divisional Playoffs: at (1) New York Giants ====
NFC Divisional Playoffs: (4) Philadelphia Eagles at (1) New York Giants – Game summary

| Quarter | 1 | 2 | 3 | 4 | Total |
|---|---|---|---|---|---|
| Eagles | 0 | 3 | 0 | 7 | 10 |
| Giants | 7 | 10 | 0 | 3 | 20 |

at Giants Stadium, East Rutherford, New Jersey

- Date: January 7, 2001
- Game time: 4:00 p.m. EST
- Game weather: 42 °F (6 °C), cloudy
- Game attendance: 78,765
- Referee: Ed Hochuli
- TV announcers (Fox): Pat Summerall (play-by-play), John Madden (color commentator), and D. J. Johnson (sideline reporter)

Game information

First quarter

- NYG – Ron Dixon 97-yard kickoff return (Brad Daluiso kick), 14:43. Giants 7–0.

Second quarter

- NYG – Brad Daluiso 37-yard field goal, 14:55. Giants 10–0. Drive: 6 plays, 14 yards, 2:19.
- NYG – Jason Sehorn 32-yard interception return (Brad Daluiso kick), 1:40. Giants 17–0.
- PHI – David Akers 28-yard field goal, 0:26. Giants 17–3. Drive: 7 plays, 40 yards, 1:14.

Third quarter

- No scoring plays.

Fourth quarter

- NYG – Brad Daluiso 25-yard field goal, 8:41. Giants 20–3. Drive: 13 plays, 88 yards, 8:11.
- PHI – Torrance Small 10-yard pass from Donovan McNabb (David Akers kick), 1:56. Giants 20–10 Drive: 3 plays, 8 yards, 0:25.

Top passers

- PHI – Donovan McNabb – 20/41, 181 yards, TD, INT
- NYG – Kerry Collins – 12/19, 125 yards

Top rushers

- PHI – Brian Mitchell – 3 rushes, 18 yards
- NYG – Ron Dayne – 17 rushes, 53 yards

Top receivers

- PHI – Charles Johnson – 5 receptions, 53 yards
- NYG – Pete Mitchell – 2 receptions, 47 yards

== Awards and honors ==
- Andy Reid, 2000 Sporting News Coach of Year
- Andy Reid, 2000 Maxwell Football Club NFL Coach of Year
