= 1958 Eastern Michigan Hurons football team =

American college football season

1958 Eastern Michigan Hurons football
- Conference: Interstate Intercollegiate Athletic Conference
- Record: 4–5 (3–3 IIAC)
- Head coach: Fred Trosko (7th season)
- MVP: Alex Klukach
- Captain: Charles J. Shonta
- Home stadium: Briggs Field

1958 Interstate Intercollegiate Athletic Conference football standings
	Conf.					Overall
Team	W		L		T	W		L		T
Western Illinois $	5	–	1	–	0	6	–	1	–	1
Southern Illinois	4	–	2	–	0	7	–	2	–	0
Central Michigan	4	–	2	–	0	7	–	3	–	0
Eastern Michigan	3	–	3	–	0	4	–	5	–	0
Northern Illinois	2	–	4	–	0	4	–	5	–	0
Illinois State Normal	2	–	4	–	0	3	–	6	–	0
Eastern Illinois	1	–	5	–	0	2	–	6	–	0
$ – Conference champion

The 1958 Eastern Michigan Hurons football team represented Eastern Michigan College (renamed Eastern Michigan University in 1959) in the Interstate Intercollegiate Athletic Conference (IIAC) during the 1958 college football season. In their seventh season under head coach Fred Trosko, the Hurons compiled a 4–5 record (3–3 against IIAC opponents) and outscored their opponents, 108 to 88. Charles J. Shonta was the team captain The team's statistical leaders included John Kubiak with 452 passing yards and 410 yards of total offense, Albert Day with 296 rushing yards, and Jerry Wedge with 183 receiving yards. On October 18, 1958, the Hurons defeated Eastern Illinois, 31–0, in front for a homecoming crowd of 7,200 at Briggs Field in Ypsilanti. Alex Klukach received the team's most valuable player award.

== Schedule ==
Date	Opponent	Site	Result	Attendance	Source
September 19	at Hope*	Holland, MI	L 7–19		
September 27	Illinois State	Briggs Field; Ypsilanti, MI	W 13–0		
October 3	Youngstown State*	Briggs Field; Ypsilanti, MI	W 21–12		
October 11	at No. 9 Central Michigan	Alumni Field; Mount Pleasant, MI (rivalry)	L 6–7		
October 18	Eastern Illinois^{†}	Briggs Field; Ypsilanti, MI	W 31–0		
October 25	at Southern Illinois	McAndrew Stadium; Carbondale, IL	L 9–13	5,000	
November 1	at Northern Illinois	Glidden Field; DeKalb, IL	W 15–7		
November 8	Western Illinois	Briggs Field; Ypsilanti, MI	L 6–27		
November 15	Saint Joseph's (IN)*	Briggs Field; Ypsilanti, MI	L 0–3		
*Non-conference game; ^{†}Homecoming; Rankings from UPI Poll released prior to the game
