= 1958 Central Michigan Chippewas football team =

American college football season

1958 Central Michigan Chippewas football
- Conference: Interstate Intercollegiate Athletic Conference
- Record: 7–3 (4–2 IIAC)
- Head coach: Kenneth Kelly (8th season)
- MVP: Walter Beach
- Captain: Al Bernardi
- Home stadium: Alumni Field

1958 Interstate Intercollegiate Athletic Conference football standings
	Conf.					Overall
Team	W		L		T	W		L		T
Western Illinois $	5	–	1	–	0	6	–	1	–	1
Southern Illinois	4	–	2	–	0	7	–	2	–	0
Central Michigan	4	–	2	–	0	7	–	3	–	0
Eastern Michigan	3	–	3	–	0	4	–	5	–	0
Northern Illinois	2	–	4	–	0	4	–	5	–	0
Illinois State Normal	2	–	4	–	0	3	–	6	–	0
Eastern Illinois	1	–	5	–	0	2	–	6	–	0
$ – Conference champion

The 1958 Central Michigan Chippewas football team represented Central Michigan College, renamed Central Michigan University in 1959, in the Interstate Intercollegiate Athletic Conference (IIAC) during the 1958 college football season. In their eighth season under head coach Kenneth Kelly, the Chippewas compiled a 7–3 record (4–2 against IIAC opponents) and outscored their opponents by a combined total of 216 to 204.

The team's statistical leaders included Oarie Lemanski with 455 passing yards and Walter Beach with 929 rushing yards and 264 receiving yards. Beach received the team's most valuable player award for the first of two consecutive years, and he was also named most valuable player in the IIAC. Five Central Michigan players (Beach, defensive end Don Beemer, defensive back Al Bernardi, defensive tackle Gene Knoblach, and guard Jerry Sieracki) received first-team honors on the All-IIAC team.

== Schedule ==
Date	Opponent	Rank	Site	Result	Attendance	Source
September 13	at Northern Michigan*		Marquette, MI	W 27–14	5,000	
September 20	at Western Michigan*		Waldo Stadium; Kalamazoo, MI (rivalry)	W 33–32	15,300	
September 27	vs. Hillsdale*		Saginaw, MI	W 19–13		
October 4	Illinois State Normal	No. 13	Alumni Field; Mount Pleasant, MI	W 33–6		
October 11	Eastern Michigan*	No. 9	Alumni Field; Mount Pleasant, MI (rivalry)	W 7–6		
October 18	at Northern Illinois	No. 12	Glidden Field; DeKalb, IL	W 33–23		
October 25	Louisville*^{†}	No. 8	Alumni Field; Mount Pleasant, MI	L 7–40	9,500	
November 1	at Eastern Illinois	No. 16	Lincoln Field; Charleston, IL	W 27–8		
November 8	Southern Illinois		Alumni Field; Mount Pleasant, MI	L 7–24		
November 15	at Western Illinois		Hanson Field; Macomb, IL	L 23–38	4,000	
*Non-conference game; ^{†}Homecoming; Rankings from UPI Poll released prior to the game
