= 1958 Eastern Illinois Panthers football team =

American college football season

1958 Eastern Illinois Panthers football
- Conference: Interstate Intercollegiate Athletic Conference
- Record: 2–6 (1–5 IIAC)
- Head coach: Ralph Kohl (2nd season)
- Home stadium: Lincoln Field

1958 Interstate Intercollegiate Athletic Conference football standings
| | Conf. | | | | | Overall |
| Team | W | | L | | T | W | | L | | T |
|---|---|---|---|---|---|---|---|---|---|---|
| Western Illinois $ | 5 | – | 1 | – | 0 | 6 | – | 1 | – | 1 |
| Southern Illinois | 4 | – | 2 | – | 0 | 7 | – | 2 | – | 0 |
| Central Michigan | 4 | – | 2 | – | 0 | 7 | – | 3 | – | 0 |
| Eastern Michigan | 3 | – | 3 | – | 0 | 4 | – | 5 | – | 0 |
| Northern Illinois | 2 | – | 4 | – | 0 | 4 | – | 5 | – | 0 |
| Illinois State Normal | 2 | – | 4 | – | 0 | 3 | – | 6 | – | 0 |
| Eastern Illinois | 1 | – | 5 | – | 0 | 2 | – | 6 | – | 0 |
$ – Conference champion

The 1958 Eastern Illinois Panthers football team represented Eastern Illinois University as a member of the Interstate Intercollegiate Athletic Conference (IIAC) during the 1958 college football season. The team was led by second-year head coach Ralph Kohl and played their home games at Lincoln Field in Charleston, Illinois. The Panthers finished the season with a 2–6 record overall and a 1–5 record in conference play.

== Schedule ==
| Date | Opponent | Site | Result | Source |
|---|---|---|---|---|
| September 20 | Indiana State* | Lincoln Field; Charleston, IL | W 30–8 | |
| September 27 | at Austin Peay* | Clarksville Municipal Stadium; Clarksville, TN | L 6–21 | |
| October 4 | at Northern Illinois | Glidden Field; DeKalb, IL | L 12–24 | |
| October 11 | Southern Illinois | Lincoln Field; Charleston, IL | L 8–29 | |
| October 18 | at Eastern Michigan | Briggs Field; Ypsilanti, MI | L 0–31 | |
| October 25 | at Western Illinois | Hanson Field; Macomb, IL | L 0–34 | |
| November 1 | No. 16 Central Michigan | Lincoln Field; Charleston, IL | L 8–27 | |
| November 8 | Illinois State Normal | Lincoln Field; Charleston, IL (rivalry) | W 20–12 | |
*Non-conference game; Rankings from UPI Poll released prior to the game
