= 1958 Western Illinois Leathernecks football team =

American college football season

1958 Western Illinois Leathernecks football

IIAC champion
- Conference: Interstate Intercollegiate Athletic Conference
- Record: 6–1–1 (5–1 IIAC)
- Head coach: Lou Saban (2nd season)
- Home stadium: Hanson Field

1958 Interstate Intercollegiate Athletic Conference football standings
	Conf.					Overall
Team	W		L		T	W		L		T
Western Illinois $	5	–	1	–	0	6	–	1	–	1
Southern Illinois	4	–	2	–	0	7	–	2	–	0
Central Michigan	4	–	2	–	0	7	–	3	–	0
Eastern Michigan	3	–	3	–	0	4	–	5	–	0
Northern Illinois	2	–	4	–	0	4	–	5	–	0
Illinois State Normal	2	–	4	–	0	3	–	6	–	0
Eastern Illinois	1	–	5	–	0	2	–	6	–	0
$ – Conference champion

The 1958 Western Illinois Leathernecks football team represented Western Illinois University as a member of the Interstate Intercollegiate Athletic Conference (IIAC) during the 1958 college football season. They were led by second-year head coach Lou Saban and played their home games at Hanson Field. The Leathernecks finished the season with a 6–1–1 record overall and a 5–1 record in conference play, winning the IIAC title.

== Schedule ==
Date	Opponent	Site	Result	Attendance	Source
September 18	St. Ambrose*	Hanson Field; Macomb, IL	W 32–25		
September 27	at Bradley*	Peoria, IL	T 6–6	5,000	
October 4	at Southern Illinois	McAndrew Stadium; Carbondale, IL	L 31–32	6,000	
October 11	Northern Illinois	Hanson Field; Macomb, IL	W 38–7		
October 25	Eastern Illinois^{†}	Hanson Field; Macomb, IL	W 34–0		
November 1	at Illinois State Normal	McCormick Field; Normal, IL	W 16–10		
November 8	at Eastern Michigan	Briggs Field; Ypsilanti, MI	W 27–6		
November 15	Central Michigan	Hanson Field; Macomb, IL	W 38–23	4,000	
*Non-conference game; ^{†}Homecoming
