= 1958 Northern Illinois Huskies football team =

American college football season

1958 Northern Illinois Huskies football
- Conference: Interstate Intercollegiate Athletic Conference
- Record: 4–5 (2–4 IIAC)
- Head coach: Howard Fletcher (3rd season)
- MVP: Dale Berman
- Captains: Ronald Hansen; Richard Stilling
- Home stadium: Glidden Field

1958 Interstate Intercollegiate Athletic Conference football standings
	Conf.					Overall
Team	W		L		T	W		L		T
Western Illinois $	5	–	1	–	0	6	–	1	–	1
Southern Illinois	4	–	2	–	0	7	–	2	–	0
Central Michigan	4	–	2	–	0	7	–	3	–	0
Eastern Michigan	3	–	3	–	0	4	–	5	–	0
Northern Illinois	2	–	4	–	0	4	–	5	–	0
Illinois State Normal	2	–	4	–	0	3	–	6	–	0
Eastern Illinois	1	–	5	–	0	2	–	6	–	0
$ – Conference champion

The 1958 Northern Illinois Huskies football team represented Northern Illinois University as a member of the Interstate Intercollegiate Athletic Conference (IIAC) during the 1958 college football season. Led by third-year head coach Howard Fletcher, the Huskies compiled an overall record of 4–5 with a mark of 2–4 in conference play, tying for fifth place in the IIAC. The team played home games at the 5,500-seat Glidden Field, located on the east end of campus, in DeKalb, Illinois.

== Schedule ==
Date	Opponent	Site	Result	Source
September 20	at Wheaton (IL)*	Wheaton, IL	L 20–40	
September 27	Beloit*	Glidden Field; DeKalb, IL	W 27–6	
October 4	Eastern Illinois	Glidden Field; DeKalb, IL	W 24–12	
October 11	at Western Illinois	Hanson Field; Macomb, IL	L 7–38	
October 18	No. 12 Central Michigan	Glidden Field; DeKalb, IL	L 23–33	
October 25	at Illinois State	Normal, IL	L 18–33	
November 1	at Eastern Michigan	Ypsilanti, MI	L 7–15	
November 9	Omaha*	Glidden Field; DeKalb, IL	W 41–0	
November 16	Southern Illinois	Glidden Field; DeKalb, IL	W 17–7	
*Non-conference game; Rankings from UPI Poll released prior to the game
