= 1958 Southern Illinois Salukis football team =

American college football season

1958 Southern Illinois Salukis football
- Conference: Interstate Intercollegiate Athletic Conference
- Record: 7–2 (4–2 IIAC)
- Head coach: Albert Kawal (4th season)
- Home stadium: McAndrew Stadium

1958 Interstate Intercollegiate Athletic Conference football standings
	Conf.					Overall
Team	W		L		T	W		L		T
Western Illinois $	5	–	1	–	0	6	–	1	–	1
Southern Illinois	4	–	2	–	0	7	–	2	–	0
Central Michigan	4	–	2	–	0	7	–	3	–	0
Eastern Michigan	3	–	3	–	0	4	–	5	–	0
Northern Illinois	2	–	4	–	0	4	–	5	–	0
Illinois State Normal	2	–	4	–	0	3	–	6	–	0
Eastern Illinois	1	–	5	–	0	2	–	6	–	0
$ – Conference champion

The 1958 Southern Illinois Salukis football team was an American football team that represented Southern Illinois University (now known as Southern Illinois University Carbondale) in the Interstate Intercollegiate Athletic Conference (IIAC) during the 1958 college football season. Under fourth-year head coach Albert Kawal, the team compiled a 7–2 record. The team played its home games at McAndrew Stadium in Carbondale, Illinois.

== Schedule ==
Date	Opponent	Site	Result	Attendance	Source
September 20	Evansville*	McAndrew Stadium; Carbondale, IL	W 34–14	5,000	
September 27	West Virginia State*	McAndrew Stadium; Carbondale, IL	W 19–0	5,500	
October 4	Western Illinois	McAndrew Stadium; Carbondale, IL	W 32–31	6,000	
October 11	at Eastern Illinois	Lincoln Field; Charleston, IL	W 29–8		
October 18	Illinois State Normal	McAndrew Stadium; Carbondale, IL	L 8–21	6,500	
October 25	Eastern Michigan	McAndrew Stadium; Carbondale, IL	W 13–9	5,000	
November 1	Washington and Lee*	McAndrew Stadium; Carbondale, IL	W 36–7	12,000	
November 8	at Central Michigan	Alumni Field; Mount Pleasant, MI	W 24–7		
November 15	at Northern Illinois	Glidden Field; DeKalb, IL	L 7–17		
*Non-conference game

== NFL draft ==
The following Saluki was selected in the 1959 NFL draft following the season.

Round	Pick	Player	Position	NFL team
19	224	Carver Shannon	Back	Los Angeles Rams
