= John Romero (American football) =

American football player (born 1976)

No. 64
- Position: Center / Offensive guard

Personal information
- Born: October 3, 1976 (age 50); San Leandro, California, U.S.
- Listed height: 6 ft 3 in (1.91 m)
- Listed weight: 315 lb (143 kg)

Career information
- College: California
- NFL draft: 2000: 6th round, 192nd overall pick

Career history
- Philadelphia Eagles (2000–2001)*; Buffalo Bills (2001)*; New Orleans Saints (2002)*; St. Louis Rams (2003)*; Everett Hawks (2005)
- * Offseason or practice squad member only

John Romero (born October 3, 1976) is an American former football center and offensive guard. He played college football for California before being selected by the Philadelphia Eagles in the sixth round of the 2000 NFL draft.

== Professional career ==
Romero was selected by the Philadelphia Eagles in the sixth round of the 2000 NFL draft with the 192nd overall pick, seven spots ahead of the New England Patriots' pick of quarterback Tom Brady. The 192nd pick was originally sent to the Eagles from the Washington Redskins in exchange for Rodney Peete on April 28, 1999. In July 2000, Romero signed a three-year contract with the Eagles for $875,000 with a $50,000 signing bonus. After originally making the Eagles' final 53-man roster, he was waived the next day to make room for center Hank Fraley, whom the Eagles claimed off waivers from the Pittsburgh Steelers. Romero spent the entire 2000 season on the Eagles' practice squad. He was re-signed to a two-year contract on February 6, 2001, before tearing a pectoral muscle in May 2001. He returned to training camp practice on August 16, but was waived by the team on August 25. Romero tried out for the Cincinnati Bengals and Buffalo Bills on October 3, 2001, and the Bills signed him to their practice squad the same day, where he spent the rest of the 2001 season. The New Orleans Saints signed Romero to a futures contract on January 17, 2002, but waived him before training camp on July 16, 2002. Romero was signed by the St. Louis Rams on August 3, 2003, and stayed with the team for a few weeks before he was waived during final roster cuts on August 25. After being out of football in 2004, he played for the Everett Hawks of the National Indoor Football League (NIFL) in 2005.

After his playing career ended, Romero became a police officer in Oakland, California.

== Legal Issues ==
In January 2025, Officer John Romero aka John Jacko Romero was named as a defendant in a federal civil rights lawsuit filed in the United States District Court for the Northern District of California. The case, Reid v. City of Oakland et al., alleges that Romero, while serving as an officer with the Oakland Police Department, engaged in evidence fabrication, retaliation, and violations of constitutional rights arising from the plaintiff's alleged false arrest and detention. The case remains pending as of 2026.
