= Luther Broughton =

American football player (born 1974)

No. 84, 88, 80
- Position: Tight end

Personal information
- Born: November 30, 1974 (age 51); Charleston, South Carolina, U.S.
- Listed height: 6 ft 2 in (1.88 m)
- Listed weight: 248 lb (112 kg)

Career information
- College: Furman
- NFL draft: 1997: 5th round, 155th overall pick

Career history
- Philadelphia Eagles (1997)*; Carolina Panthers (1998); Philadelphia Eagles (1999–2000); Carolina Panthers (2001); Chicago Bears (2002)*; Green Bay Packers (2003)*
- * Offseason or practice squad member only

Career NFL statistics
- Receptions: 46
- Receiving yards: 563
- Touchdowns: 5
- Stats at Pro Football Reference

Luther Rashard Broughton Jr. (born November 30, 1974) is an American former professional football player who was a tight end in the National Football League (NFL) for the Carolina Panthers and Philadelphia Eagles. He is the older brother of former Oklahoma State Cowboy Scott Broughton.

He graduated and played his high school football at Cainhoy High School in Huger, South Carolina. He played college football for the Furman Paladins.

He was selected by the Eagles in the fifth round (155th overall) of the 1997 NFL draft. The 6'2", 248 pound tight end, however, played for the Panthers in 1998. That season, Broughton played in 16 games and had six receptions for 142 yards and a touchdown. On September 5, 1999, Broughton was traded to the Eagles and played for the Eagles in 1999 and 2000. In 1999, he played in 16 games and had 26 receptions for 295 yards and four touchdowns. In 2000, he played in seven games and had 12 receptions for 104 yards. In 2001, he signed as a free agent with the Panthers and played for them again, having two receptions for 22 yards in his 14 games played. He was signed as a free agent with the Chicago Bears in 2002. He was later released and signed with the Green Bay Packers in 2003.
