= Na Brown =

American football player (born 1977)

No. 85
- Position: Wide receiver

Personal information
- Born: February 22, 1977 (age 49); Reidsville, North Carolina, U.S.
- Listed height: 6 ft 0 in (1.83 m)
- Listed weight: 196 lb (89 kg)

Career information
- High school: Reidsville
- College: North Carolina (1995–1998)
- NFL draft: 1999: 4th round, 130th overall pick

Career history
- Philadelphia Eagles (1999–2001); Orlando Predators (2002–2003)*; Huntington Hammer (2012)*; Sarasota Thunder (2013)*
- * Offseason or practice squad member only

Career NFL statistics
- Receptions: 34
- Receiving yards: 363
- Receiving touchdowns: 2
- Stats at Pro Football Reference
- Stats at ArenaFan.com

Na Orlando Brown (born February 22, 1977) is an American former professional football player who was a wide receiver for three seasons with the Philadelphia Eagles of National Football League (NFL). He played college football for the North Carolina Tar Heels and was selected by the Eagles in the fourth round of the 1999 NFL draft.

== College career ==
Brown attended the University of North Carolina at Chapel Hill in Chapel Hill, North Carolina. While at North Carolina, Brown accumulated 165 catches for 2,086 yards and 14 touchdowns. He also had a 48-yard touchdown run.

== Professional career ==
=== Philadelphia Eagles ===
Brown was selected in the fourth round of the 1999 NFL draft, as the 130th pick overall by the Philadelphia Eagles. In a Wild Card round win against the Tampa Bay Buccaneers in the 2000-01 NFL playoffs, he caught a 5-yard touchdown pass from Donovan McNabb. He played in parts of three seasons with the Eagles before he was released.

=== Orlando Predators ===
In October 2002, Brown signed with the Orlando Predators of the Arena Football League. After spending three months as part of the team in the offseason, he was released on January 23, 2003. He was later signed onto the Giants.

=== Huntington Hammer ===
On September 16, 2011, it was announced that Brown had signed with the Huntington Hammer of the Ultimate Indoor Football League.
