= Thomas Hamner =

American football player (born 1976)

No. 12
- Position: Running back

Personal information
- Born: December 25, 1976 (age 49); Tuscaloosa, Alabama, U.S.
- Listed height: 6 ft 0 in (1.83 m)
- Listed weight: 197 lb (89 kg)

Career information
- High school: Hamilton (OH)
- College: Minnesota (1995–1999)
- NFL draft: 2000: 6th round, 171st overall pick

Career history
- Philadelphia Eagles (2000)

Awards and highlights
- First-team All-Big Ten (1999)

Thomas Hamner (born December 25, 1976) is an American former professional football player who was a running back in the National Football League (NFL). He played college football for the Minnesota Golden Gophers and was selected by the Philadelphia Eagles in the sixth round of the 2000 NFL draft. He was released the following season, before playing in any games, ending his professional career.

== Early life ==
Thomas Hamner was born on December 25, 1976, in Tuscaloosa, Alabama. He lived most of his childhood in Middletown, Ohio. He attended high school in Hamilton, Ohio. He originally wanted to be a quarterback. "I looked over and there's this skinny little kid, about 140 pounds, if that," his coach said. "I let him play quarterback for a couple of days, but he had a lousy arm. So I said, 'Son, why don't you try receiver?'" After three weeks at receiver, he tried out at tailback. "I said, 'Hamner, you're a tailback.' My God, he went in there and riddled our daggone first-team defense. The defensive coaches ran up to me after practice and said, 'What in the world is that little kid doing playing receiver?' The rest is history, I guess," said his coach Ed Mignery.

== College career ==
Following high school he earned a scholarship offer from Minnesota. He first gained interest from Ohio State. "Ohio State was the first school to show interest in me, but when it came time for them to talk to me, they made some changes in their assistant coaches," Hamner said. "I don't know if I got lost in the system or if they just didn't want me, but I never heard back from them."

After spending his true freshman year as a redshirt, Hamner made his college football debut in September 1996. He finished his first career game, a 30–3 victory over Northeast Louisiana, with over 150 rushing yards, scoring one touchdown. By the end of the first half, Hamner had already rushed for 109 yards. By late November, Hamner had already rushed for over 850 yards. He led the team in rushing yards for 1996.

Hamner remained a key contributor to the team through his sophomore year. In October, against the Penn State Nittany Lions, he recorded over 150 yards rushing, before a late fumble lost the game. "It was third-and-six. We ran a 28 and it (the hole) just opened up," he said, "I took my focus off the ball and looked at the hole. When I turned back to get it the ball hit my hands and bounced down." Chris Snyder picked up the fumble and Curtis Enis made the game-winning score a few plays later.

Two weeks after the game-losing fumble, Hamner threatened to leave Minnesota, telling the St. Paul Pioneer Press he would transfer "out of frustration and disappointment." One day later he announced he would stay with the team. He finished the season with 663 rushing yards, over 200 less than before, but still leading the team.

In week one of the 1998 season, Hamner recorded 137 yards rushing and one touchdown in a 17–14 victory over the Arkansas State Indians. Two weeks later he had another 100-yard game, compiling 128 yards and a touchdown in a 41–14 triumph over Memphis. Minnesota finished the year with a record of 5–6, as Hamner led the team with 838 rushing yards, scoring four touchdowns.

Hamner would have his best season in his senior year of 1999. By week six he had rushed for 734 yards, following a career-high 184 yards gained in a victory over Illinois. Against Purdue two weeks later, he amassed 166 yards on 20 carries, scoring two touchdowns.

When Hamner lost on a fumble to Penn State in 1997, he vowed to make amends for it. He did in early November 1999, scoring a late touchdown against the Nittany Lions to win by one point.

He finished the season with 1,426 rushing yards on 308 carries, scoring 13 touchdowns in total. His performance earned him first-team All-Big Ten honors.

== Professional career ==
After his senior season at Minnesota, Hamner was selected in the 6th round (171st overall) of the 2000 NFL draft by the Philadelphia Eagles. In his first preseason game, against the Cleveland Browns, he played the first three quarters on special teams before getting his first call as running back with 8 minutes remaining. He appeared on two offensive plays, rushing twice for 16 yards. He was released at roster cuts and subsequently signed to the practice squad. He was promoted to the active roster on November 25, one day before their game against the Washington Redskins. He was on the active roster for the final few games, but did not play in any of them.

In May 2001, a warrant was issued for his arrest after he failed to appear in court for a hearing on animal cruelty for beating his pit bull. He was released by the Eagles a few days later, ending his professional career.
