= Martel Hight =

American football player

No. 4 – Vanderbilt Commodores
- Position: Cornerback/wide receiver
- Class: Senior

Personal information
- Listed height: 6 ft 0 in (1.83 m)
- Listed weight: 188 lb (85 kg)

Career information
- High school: Rome (Rome, Georgia)
- College: Vanderbilt (2023–present)

Awards and highlights
- Second-team All-SEC (2024)
- Stats at ESPN

Martel Hight Jr. is an American football cornerback & wide receiver for the Vanderbilt Commodores.

== Early life ==
Hight attended Rome High School in Rome, Georgia. Coming out of high school, he was rated as a three-star recruit and the 49th overall cornerback in the class of 2023, and committed to play college football for the Vanderbilt Commodores.

== College career ==
As a freshman in 2023, Hight played in all 12 games, tallying 38 tackles and an interception. In 2024, he appeared in all 13 games, recording 33 tackles with two being for a loss and two interceptions, while returning 18 punts for 265 yards and a touchdown, earning second-team all-SEC honors as a returner. Heading into the 2025 season, Hight planned to be a three-way player, as a receiver, defensive back, and returner. In the season opener, he hauled in two passes for 17 yards and made four tackles in a win over Charleston Southern. In week 3, Hight recorded four receptions for 33 yards in an upset win over South Carolina.

=== Statistics ===
Year	Team	GP	Receiving				Rushing				Defense											Punt Returns			
Year	Team	GP	Rec	Yds	Avg	TD	Att	Yds	Avg	TD	Solo	Ast	Comb	TFL	Sk	Int	IntYds	IntAvg	IntTD	PD	FF	Ret	Yds	Avg	TD
2023	Vanderbilt	11	0	0	0.0	0	0	0	0	0	25	13	38	0.0	0.0	1	37	37.0	1	1	0	1	22	22.0	0
2024	Vanderbilt	13	0	0	0.0	0	0	0	0	0	26	7	33	2.0	0.0	2	3	1.5	0	4	1	18	265	14.7	1
2025	Vanderbilt	13	7	64	9.1	0	1	2	2.0	0	24	11	35	0.5	0.0	4	71	17.8	0	2	0	10	76	7.6	0
2026	Vanderbilt	2	0	0	0.0	0	0	0	0	0	3	4	7	0.0	0.0	1	2	2.0	0	1	0	5	63	12.6	0
Career		38	7	64	9.1	0	1	2	2.0	0	78	35	113	2.5	0.0	8	113	14.1	1	8	1	34	426	12.5	
