= 2026 Vanderbilt Commodores football team =

American college football season

2026 Vanderbilt Commodores football
- Conference: Southeastern Conference
- Record: 4–7 (1–7 SEC)
- Head coach: Clark Lea (6th season)
- Offensive coordinator: Tim Beck (3rd season)
- Offensive scheme: Pistol
- Defensive coordinator: Steve Gregory (3rd season)
- Base defense: 4–2–5
- Home stadium: FirstBank Stadium

2026 Southeastern Conference football standings
| | Conf. | | | Overall |
| Team | W | | L | W | | L |
|---|---|---|---|---|---|---|
| No. 1 Georgia y | 8 | – | 1 | 10 | – | 1 |
| No. 5 Texas | 6 | – | 2 | 9 | – | 2 |
| No. 9 Tennessee | 6 | – | 2 | 9 | – | 2 |
| No. 3 Alabama | 6 | – | 2 | 9 | – | 2 |
| No. 22 Oklahoma | 5 | – | 3 | 7 | – | 4 |
| No. 24 Florida | 5 | – | 4 | 7 | – | 4 |
| No. 16 Kentucky | 5 | – | 4 | 7 | – | 4 |
| No. 25 Ole Miss | 4 | – | 4 | 7 | – | 4 |
| Auburn | 4 | – | 4 | 7 | – | 4 |
| Missouri | 4 | – | 4 | 7 | – | 4 |
| No. 21 South Carolina | 4 | – | 5 | 6 | – | 5 |
| LSU | 3 | – | 5 | 6 | – | 5 |
| Mississippi State | 2 | – | 6 | 5 | – | 6 |
| Arkansas | 2 | – | 6 | 4 | – | 7 |
| Texas A&M | 1 | – | 7 | 4 | – | 7 |
| Vanderbilt | 1 | – | 7 | 4 | – | 7 |
Championship: Georgia vs TBD
^ – College Football Playoff participant; $ – Conference champion; y – Championship game participant; As of November 22, 2026; Rankings from CFP rankings

The 2026 Vanderbilt Commodores football team represents Vanderbilt University as a member of the Southeastern Conference (SEC) during the 2026 NCAA Division I FBS football season. The Commodores are led by Clark Lea in his sixth year as their head coach. The Commodores play their home games at FirstBank Stadium located in Nashville, Tennessee.

== Schedule ==
| Date | Time | Opponent | Site | TV | Result | Attendance |
|---|---|---|---|---|---|---|
| September 5 | 6:00 p.m. | No. 15 (FCS) Austin Peay* | FirstBank Stadium; Nashville, TN | SECN+ | W 28–9 | 35,000 |
| September 12 | 3:15 p.m. | Delaware* | FirstBank Stadium; Nashville, TN | SECN | W 35–26 | 35,000 |
| September 19 | 11:45 a.m. | NC State* | FirstBank Stadium; Nashville, TN | SECN | W 35–31 | 35,000 |
| September 26 | 3:15 p.m. | at Auburn | Jordan–Hare Stadium; Auburn, AL | SECN | L 15–21 | 88,043 |
| October 3 | 11:45 a.m. | at No. 2 Georgia | Sanford Stadium; Athens, GA (rivalry) | SECN | L 14–38 | 93,033 |
| October 10 | 2:30 p.m. | No. 9 Ole Miss | FirstBank Stadium; Nashville, TN (rivalry) | ESPN | L 17–52 | 35,000 |
| October 17 | 6:00 p.m. | Arkansas | FirstBank Stadium; Nashville, TN | ESPN2 | L 21–31 | 35,000 |
| October 24 | 6:30 p.m. | at No. 12 Kentucky | Kroger Field; Lexington, KY (rivalry) | SECN | L 17–34 | 61,843 |
| November 7 | 3:15 p.m. | at Mississippi State | Davis Wade Stadium; Starkville, MS | SECN | W 25–23 | 48,904 |
| November 14 | 11:45 a.m. | No. 3 Alabama | FirstBank Stadium; Nashville, TN | SECN | L 6–21 | 35,000 |
| November 21 | 11:00 a.m. | at No. 24 Florida | Ben Hill Griffin Stadium; Gainesville, FL | SECN | L 27–34 | 88,025 |
| November 28 | 6:00 p.m. | Tennessee | FirstBank Stadium; Nashville, TN (rivalry) | ESPN | | |
*Non-conference game; Rankings from AP Poll (and CFP Rankings, after November 3) - Released prior to game; All times are in Central time

== Game summaries ==
=== vs No. 15 (FCS) Austin Peay ===
No. 15 (FCS) Austin Peay Governors (1–0) at Vanderbilt Commodores (0–0) – Game summary

| Quarter | 1 | 2 | 3 | 4 | Total |
|---|---|---|---|---|---|
| No. 15 (FCS) Governors | 6 | 3 | 0 | 0 | 9 |
| Commodores | 5 | 10 | 6 | 7 | 28 |

at FirstBank Stadium • Nashville, Tennessee

- Date: September 5
- Game time: 6:00 p.m. CDT
- Game weather: Sunny • Temperature: 94 °F (34 °C) • Wind: SE at 3 miles per hour (4.8 km/h)
- Game attendance: 35,000
- Referee: Daniel Gautreaux
- TV announcers (SECN+): Courtney Lyle and Rene Ingoglia

Game information
First quarter
- VAN – Brock Taylor 32-yard field goal, 8:59. Commodores 3–0. Drive: 13 plays, 61 yards, 6:01.
- APSU – Denver Harper 24-yard pass from Chris Parson (Nick Guagliano kick BLOCKED), 6:57. Governors 6–3. Drive: 7 plays, 75 yards, 2:02.
- VAN – Martel Hight defensive PAT conversion, 6:57. Governors 6–5.

Second quarter

- VAN – Brock Taylor 37-yard field goal, 14:19. Commodores 8–6. Drive: 13 plays, 73 yards, 7:31.
- VAN – Blaze Berlowitz 7-yard run (Brock Taylor kick), 6:21. Commodores 15–6. Drive: 9 plays, 88 yards, 5:13.
- APSU – Hamilton DiBoyan 51-yard field goal, 1:33. Commodores 15–9. Drive: 10 plays, 42 yards, 4:48.

Third quarter

- VAN – Sedrick Alexander 18-yard run (pass failed), 5:24. Commodores 21–9. Drive: 9 plays, 55 yards, 5:23.

Fourth quarter

- VAN – Josiah Broxton 27-yard punt return (Brock Taylor kick), 14:50. Commodores 28–9.

| Statistics | APSU | VAN |
|---|---|---|
| First downs | 11 | 20 |
| Plays–yards | 46–178 | 63–395 |
| Rushes–yards | 25–62 | 38–186 |
| Passing yards | 116 | 209 |
| Passing: comp–att–int | 12–21–0 | 18–25–0 |
| Turnovers | 0 | 0 |
| Time of possession | 24:13 | 35:47 |

| Team | Category | Player | Statistics |
|---|---|---|---|
| Austin Peay | Passing | Chris Parson | 12/21, 116 yards, TD |
| Austin Peay | Rushing | Courtland Simmons | 5 carries, 26 yards |
| Austin Peay | Receiving | Marvin Sims | 6 receptions, 55 yards |
| Vanderbilt | Passing | Blaze Berlowitz | 11/16, 149 yards |
| Vanderbilt | Rushing | Sedrick Alexander | 10 carries, 60 yards, TD |
| Vanderbilt | Receiving | Junior Sherrill | 4 receptions, 70 yards |

=== vs Delaware ===
Delaware Fightin' Blue Hens (1–0) at Vanderbilt Commodores (1–0) – Game summary

| Quarter | 1 | 2 | 3 | 4 | Total |
|---|---|---|---|---|---|
| Fightin' Blue Hens | 0 | 17 | 0 | 9 | 26 |
| Commodores | 14 | 0 | 21 | 0 | 35 |

at FirstBank Stadium • Nashville, Tennessee

- Date: September 12
- Game time: 3:15 p.m. CDT
- Game weather: Cloudy • Temperature: 87 °F (31 °C) • Wind: W at 7 miles per hour (11 km/h)
- Game attendance: 35,000
- Referee: Adam Savoie
- TV announcers (SECN): Dave Neal, Cole Cubelic, and Tori Petry

Game information
First quarter
- VAN – Jared Curtis 1-yard run (Brock Taylor kick), 1:19. Commodores 7–0. Drive: 7 plays, 41 yards, 3:25.
- VAN – Sedrick Alexander 9-yard run (Brock Taylor kick), 0:00. Commodores 14–0. Drive: 3 plays, 26 yards, 1:14.

Second quarter

- DEL – Tucker Smack 37-yard field goal, 12:51. Commodores 14–3. Drive: 6 plays, 55 yards, 2:09.
- DEL – Viron Ellison Jr. 1-yard run (Tucker Smack kick), 1:56. Commodores 14–10. Drive: 10 plays, 82 yards, 5:20.
- DEL – Bryson Graves 0-yard blocked punt return (Tucker Smack kick), 0:17. Fightin' Blue Hens 17–14.

Third quarter

- VAN – Jared Curtis 1-yard run (Brock Taylor kick), 11:05. Commodores 21–17. Drive: 9 plays, 70 yards, 3:48.
- VAN – Austin Howard 0-yard blocked punt return (Brock Taylor kick), 9:30. Commodores 28–17.
- VAN – Walter Taylor 19-yard pass from Jared Curtis (Brock Taylor kick), 0:00. Commodores 35–17. Drive: 10 plays, 60 yards, 5:13.

Fourth quarter

- DEL – Tucker Smack 40-yard field goal, 11:55. Commodores 35–20. Drive: 8 plays, 52 yards, 3:05.
- DEL – Da'Wain Lofton 43-yard pass from Nick Minicucci (pass failed), 6:37. Commodores 35–26. Drive: 4 plays, 80 yards, 2:13.

| Statistics | DEL | VAN |
|---|---|---|
| First downs | 18 | 17 |
| Plays–yards | 68–338 | 69–339 |
| Rushes–yards | 36–98 | 38–100 |
| Passing yards | 240 | 239 |
| Passing: comp–att–int | 15–32–2 | 17–31–0 |
| Turnovers | 2 | 1 |
| Time of possession | 31:20 | 28:40 |

| Team | Category | Player | Statistics |
|---|---|---|---|
| Delaware | Passing | Nick Minicucci | 11/27, 182 yards, TD, 2 INT |
| Delaware | Rushing | Jo Silver | 16 carries, 109 yards |
| Delaware | Receiving | Da'Wain Lofton | 4 receptions, 142 yards, TD |
| Vanderbilt | Passing | Jared Curtis | 14/22, 210 yards, TD |
| Vanderbilt | Rushing | Sedrick Alexander | 9 carries, 39 yards, TD |
| Vanderbilt | Receiving | Junior Sherrill | 5 receptions, 94 yards |

=== vs NC State ===
The Commodores overcame a 24–7 deficit in the third quarter. After falling behind early, they rallied to make it a three point game late in the fourth and got the ball back with less than a minute to play. However, they threw a pick at the goal line with less than 30 seconds left, giving NC State the ball back. With six seconds left, NC State attempted to take a safety to run out the clock, but CJ Bailey fumbled the ball in the end zone. Vanderbilt recovered in the end zone for a touchdown to complete the comeback and improve to 3–0. The play is known as the "Music City Miracle II" or the "Music City Miscue".

NC State Wolfpack (1–1) at Vanderbilt Commodores (2–0) – Game summary

| Quarter | 1 | 2 | 3 | 4 | Total |
|---|---|---|---|---|---|
| Wolfpack | 14 | 3 | 7 | 7 | 31 |
| Commodores | 0 | 7 | 7 | 21 | 35 |

at FirstBank Stadium • Nashville, Tennessee

- Date: September 19
- Game time: 11:47 a.m. CDT
- Game weather: Sunny • Temperature: 93 °F (34 °C)
- Game attendance: 35,000
- Referee: Mike Roche
- TV announcers (SECN): Taylor Zarzour, Matt Stinchcomb and Michella Chester
- Report: Official report

| Statistics | NCSU | VAN |
|---|---|---|
| First downs | 25 | 20 |
| Plays–yards | 79–446 | 58–409 |
| Rushes–yards | 41–166 | 24–132 |
| Passing yards | 280 | 277 |
| Passing: comp–att–int | 26–38–1 | 20–34–2 |
| Time of possession | 35:49 | 24:11 |

| Team | Category | Player | Statistics |
|---|---|---|---|
| NC State | Passing | CJ Bailey | 25/37, 275 yards, 3 TD |
| NC State | Rushing | Jayden "Duke" Scott | 16 carries, 51 yards |
| NC State | Receiving | Keenan Jackson | 9 receptions, 102 yards, 3 TD |
| Vanderbilt | Passing | Jared Curtis | 20/34, 277 yards, 3 TD, 2 INT |
| Vanderbilt | Rushing | Jared Curtis | 12 carries, 64 yards |
| Vanderbilt | Receiving | Junior Sherrill | 6 receptions, 108 yards, 2 TD |

=== at Auburn ===
Vanderbilt Commodores (3–0) at Auburn Tigers (2–1) – Game summary

| Quarter | 1 | 2 | 3 | 4 | Total |
|---|---|---|---|---|---|
| Commodores | 3 | 0 | 6 | 6 | 15 |
| Tigers | 7 | 7 | 7 | 0 | 21 |

at Jordan–Hare Stadium • Auburn, Alabama

- Date: September 26
- Game time: 3:15 p.m. CDT
- Game weather: Sunny • Temperature: 81 °F (27 °C) • Wind: NW 6 miles per hour (9.7 km/h)
- Game attendance: 88,043
- Referee: David Smith
- TV announcers (SECN): Taylor Zarzour, Matt Stinchcomb and Michella Chester

Game information
First quarter
- VAN – Brock Taylor 39-yard field goal, 9:29. Vanderbilt 3–0. Drive: 4 plays, 3 yards, 1:59.
- AUB – Chas Nimrod 33-yard pass from Byrum Brown (Alex McPherson kick), 7:25. Auburn 7–3. Drive: 6 plays, 75 yards, 2:04.

Second quarter

- AUB – Cade Carlson 10-yard blocked punt recovery (Alex McPherson kick), 8:56. Auburn 14–3.

Third quarter

- VAN – Sedrick Alexander 3-yard rush (Jared Curtis pass failed), 7:07. Auburn 14–9. Drive: 14 plays, 75 yards, 7:53.
- AUB – Byrum Brown 2-yard rush (Alex McPherson kick), 4:40. Auburn 21–9. Drive: 8 plays, 75 yards, 2:27.

Fourth quarter

- VAN – Brock Taylor 47-yard field goal, 12:17. Auburn 21–12. Drive: 16 plays, 46 yards, 7:23.
- VAN – Brock Taylor 45-yard field goal, 6:26. Auburn 21–15. Drive: 9 plays, 51 yards, 3:13.

| Statistics | VAN | AUB |
|---|---|---|
| First downs | 22 | 15 |
| Plays–yards | 75–311 | 58–279 |
| Rushes–yards | 41–112 | 31–139 |
| Passing yards | 199 | 140 |
| Passing: comp–att–int | 22–34–1 | 18–27–1 |
| Turnovers | 1 | 1 |
| Time of possession | 37:28 | 22:32 |

| Team | Category | Player | Statistics |
|---|---|---|---|
| Vanderbilt | Passing | Jared Curtis | 22/33, 199 yards, INT |
| Vanderbilt | Rushing | Jared Curtis | 18 carries, 46 yards |
| Vanderbilt | Receiving | Junior Sherrill | 6 receptions, 95 yards |
| Auburn | Passing | Byrum Brown | 18/27, 140 yards, TD, INT |
| Auburn | Rushing | Jeremiah Cobb | 8 carries, 58 yards |
| Auburn | Receiving | Chas Nimrod | 5 receptions, 52 yards, TD |

=== at No. 2 Georgia (rivalry) ===
Georgia and Vanderbilt have a long history and an ongoing rivalry. The teams have met 83 times since 1893, with the Bulldogs leading 61–20–2.

The week before the game, Georgia coach Kirby Smart said Vanderbilt coach Clark Lea is "super intelligent," and credited him with building "a great program, a great team."

Vanderbilt Commodores (3–1) at No. 2 Georgia Bulldogs (4–0) – Game summary

| Quarter | 1 | 2 | 3 | 4 | Total |
|---|---|---|---|---|---|
| Commodores | 7 | 7 | 0 | 0 | 14 |
| No. 2 Bulldogs | 7 | 14 | 7 | 10 | 38 |

at Sanford Stadium • Athens, Georgia

- Date: October 3
- Game time: 11:45 a.m.
- Game weather: Cloudy • Temperature: 79 °F (26 °C) • Wind: SW at 3 miles per hour (4.8 km/h)
- Game attendance: 93,033
- Referee: Jeff Heaser
- TV announcers (SECN): Matt Schumacker, Aaron Murray, and Taylor Davis

Game information
First quarter
- (6:57) UGA – Landon Roldan 2-yard pass from Gunner Stockton, Peyton Woodring kick (Drive: 10 plays, 80 yards, 5:30; Georgia 7–0)
- (0:12) VAN – Junior Sherrill 60-yard pass from Blaze Berlowitz, Brock Taylor kick (Drive: 7 plays, 95 yards, 4:23; Tied 7–7)

Second quarter

- (14:29) UGA – Chauncey Bowens 1-yard run, Peyton Woodring kick (Drive: 3 plays, 75 yards, 0:43; Georgia 14–7)
- (3:58) UGA – Jaden Reddell 1-yard run, Peyton Woodring kick (Drive: 8 plays, 60 yards, 3:35; Georgia 21–7)
- (0:31) VAN – Sedrick Alexander 2-yard run, Brock Taylor kick (Drive: 10 plays, 73 yards, 3:27; Georgia 21–14)

Third quarter

- (8:21) UGA – Elyiss Williams 1-yard pass from Gunner Stockton, Peyton Woodring kick (Drive: 11 plays, 75 yards, 6:39; Georgia 28–14)

Fourth quarter

- (12:27) UGA – Peyton Woodring 39-yard field goal (Drive: 9 plays, 38 yards, 3:54; Georgia 31–14)
- (6:02) UGA – Dwight Phillips Jr. 12-yard pass from Gunner Stockton, Peyton Woodring kick (Drive: 12 plays, 70 yards, 6:14; Georgia 38–14)

| Statistics | VAN | UGA |
|---|---|---|
| First downs | 13 | 26 |
| Plays–yards | 51−293 | 66−471 |
| Rushes–yards | 26−85 | 34−176 |
| Passing yards | 208 | 295 |
| Passing: comp–att–int | 14−25−1 | 25−32−0 |
| Turnovers | 1 | 0 |
| Time of possession | 27:12 | 32:48 |

| Team | Category | Player | Statistics |
|---|---|---|---|
| Vanderbilt | Passing | Blaze Berlowitz | 12/23, 190 yards, TD, INT |
| Vanderbilt | Rushing | Blaze Berlowitz | 8 carries, 37 yards |
| Vanderbilt | Receiving | Junior Sherrill | 7 receptions, 107 yards, TD |
| Georgia | Passing | Gunner Stockton | 25/32, 295 yards, 3 TD |
| Georgia | Rushing | Bo Walker | 5 carries, 71 yards |
| Georgia | Receiving | Dwight Phillips Jr. | 5 receptions, 75 yards, TD |

=== vs No. 9 Ole Miss (rivalry) ===
No. 9 Ole Miss Rebels (3–1) at Vanderbilt Commodores (3–2) – Game summary

| Quarter | 1 | 2 | 3 | 4 | Total |
|---|---|---|---|---|---|
| No. 9 Rebels | 14 | 28 | 0 | 10 | 52 |
| Commodores | 3 | 0 | 7 | 7 | 17 |

at FirstBank Stadium • Nashville, Tennessee

- Date: October 10
- Game time: 2:30 p.m. CDT
- Game weather: Rain • Temperature: 63 °F (17 °C) • Wind: NE at 12 miles per hour (19 km/h)
- Game attendance: 35,000
- Referee: David Smith
- TV announcers (ESPN): Joe Tessitore, Jesse Palmer, and Kris Budden

| Statistics | MISS | VAN |
|---|---|---|
| First downs | 22 | 19 |
| Plays–yards | 65–409 | 74–343 |
| Rushes–yards | 36–196 | 37–103 |
| Passing yards | 213 | 240 |
| Passing: comp–att–int | 20–30–1 | 21–37–2 |
| Time of possession | 26:04 | 33:56 |

| Team | Category | Player | Statistics |
|---|---|---|---|
| Ole Miss | Passing | Trinidad Chambliss | 20/30, 213 yards, 3 TD, INT |
| Ole Miss | Rushing | Makhi Frazier | 13 carries, 73 yards |
| Ole Miss | Receiving | Deuce Alexander | 5 receptions, 74 yards, TD |
| Vanderbilt | Passing | Jared Curtis | 19/32, 222 yards, 1 TD, 2 INT |
| Vanderbilt | Rushing | Makhilyn Young | 9 carries, 37 yards |
| Vanderbilt | Receiving | Ja'Cory Thomas | 3 receptions, 60 yards, TD |

=== vs Arkansas ===
Arkansas Razorbacks (2–4) at Vanderbilt Commodores (3–3) – Game summary

| Quarter | 1 | 2 | 3 | 4 | Total |
|---|---|---|---|---|---|
| Razorbacks | 0 | 14 | 14 | 3 | 31 |
| Commodores | 7 | 7 | 7 | 0 | 21 |

at FirstBank Stadium • Nashville, Tennessee

- Date: October 17
- Game time: 6:00 p.m. CDT
- Game weather: Sunny • Temperature: 60 °F (16 °C) • Wind: N 10 miles per hour (16 km/h)
- Game attendance: 35,000
- Referee: Adam Savoie
- TV announcers (ESPN2): Taylor Zarzour (play-by-play), Matt Stinchcomb (analyst), and Michella Chester (sideline reporter)

| Statistics | ARK | VAN |
|---|---|---|
| First downs | 24 | 20 |
| Plays–yards | 72–438 | 60–390 |
| Rushes–yards | 41–187 | 29–116 |
| Passing yards | 251 | 274 |
| Passing: comp–att–int | 21–31–0 | 19–31–2 |
| Turnovers | 0 | 2 |
| Time of possession | 33:47 | 26:13 |

| Team | Category | Player | Statistics |
|---|---|---|---|
| Arkansas | Passing | KJ Jackson | 21/31, 251 yards |
| Arkansas | Rushing | KJ Jackson | 11 carries, 58 yards, TD |
| Arkansas | Receiving | Antonio Jordan | 5 receptions, 74 yards |
| Vanderbilt | Passing | Jared Curtis | 19/31, 274 yards, TD, 2 INT |
| Vanderbilt | Rushing | Sedrick Alexander | 10 carries, 57 yards, TD |
| Vanderbilt | Receiving | Junior Sherrill | 8 receptions, 99 yards, TD |

=== at No. 12 Kentucky (rivalry) ===
Vanderbilt Commodores (3–4) at No. 12 Kentucky Wildcats (6–1) – Game summary

| Quarter | 1 | 2 | 3 | 4 | Total |
|---|---|---|---|---|---|
| Commodores | 3 | 7 | 7 | 0 | 17 |
| No. 12 Wildcats | 0 | 14 | 10 | 10 | 34 |

at Kroger Field • Lexington, Kentucky

- Date: October 24
- Game time: 6:30 p.m. CDT
- Game weather: Clear • Temperature: 64 °F (18 °C) • Wind: E at 5 miles per hour (8.0 km/h)
- Game attendance: 61,843
- Referee: Jeff Heaser
- TV announcers (SECN): Matt Schumacker, Aaron Murray, and Taylor Davis

Game information

First quarter

- (3:57) VAN - Brock Taylor 30-yard field goal (Drive: 4 plays, 8 yards, 2:12); Commodores 3-0

Second quarter

- (9:03) VAN - Jayvontay Conner 3-yard pass from Jared Curtis (Brock Taylor kick) (Drive: 16 plays, 95 yards, 8:55); Commodores 10-0
- (5:04) UK - DJ Miller 9-yard pass from Kenny Minchey (Adam Zouagui kick) (Drive: 7 plays, 75 yards, 3:59); Commodores 10-7
- (0:21) UK - Willie Rodriguez 1-yard run (Adam Zouagui kick) (Drive: 13 plays, 79 yards, 3:28); Wildcats 14-10

Third quarter

- (10:35) UK - Brennen Ward 10-yard run (Adam Zouagui kick) (Drive: 8 plays, 75 yards, 4:25); Wildcats 21-10
- (5:45) VAN - Ja'Cory Thomas 34-yard pass from Jared Curtis (Brock Taylor kick) (Drive: 9 plays, 75 yards, 4:50); Wildcats 21-17
- (1:24) UK - Adam Zouagui 47-yard field goal (Drive: 10 plays, 46 yards, 4:21); Wildcats 24-17

Fourth quarter

- (14:10) UK - Adam Zouagui 32-yard field goal (Drive: 4 plays, 4 yards, 1:04); Wildcats 27-17
- (5:11) UK - Kenny Minchey 1-yard run (Adam Zouagui kick) (Drive: 13 plays, 77 yards, 6:38); Wildcats 34-17

| Statistics | VAN | UK |
|---|---|---|
| First downs | 15 | 24 |
| Plays–yards | 53–262 | 65–376 |
| Rushes–yards | 17–15 | 39–173 |
| Passing yards | 247 | 203 |
| Passing: comp–att–int | 27–36–1 | 19–26–0 |
| Time of possession | 28:57 | 31:03 |

| Team | Category | Player | Statistics |
|---|---|---|---|
| Vanderbilt | Passing | Jared Curtis | 27/36, 247 yards, 2 TD, INT |
| Vanderbilt | Rushing | Jared Curtis | 8 carries, 6 yards |
| Vanderbilt | Receiving | Junior Sherrill | 8 receptions, 78 yards |
| Kentucky | Passing | Kenny Minchey | 19/26, 203 yards, TD |
| Kentucky | Rushing | Jovantae Barnes | 15 carries, 68 yards |
| Kentucky | Receiving | Kenny Darby | 4 receptions, 71 yards |

=== at Mississippi State ===
Vanderbilt Commodores (3–5) at Mississippi State Bulldogs (4–4) – Game summary

| Quarter | 1 | 2 | 3 | 4 | Total |
|---|---|---|---|---|---|
| Commodores | 3 | 13 | 3 | 6 | 25 |
| Bulldogs | 0 | 0 | 14 | 9 | 23 |

at Davis Wade Stadium • Starkville, Mississippi

- Date: November 7
- TV announcers (SECN): Dave Neal, Cole Cubelic, and Tori Petry

| Statistics | VAN | MSST |
|---|---|---|
| First downs | | |
| Plays–yards | | |
| Rushes–yards | | |
| Passing yards | | |
| Passing: comp–att–int | | |
| Time of possession | | |

| Team | Category | Player | Statistics |
|---|---|---|---|
| Vanderbilt | Passing | | |
| Vanderbilt | Rushing | | |
| Vanderbilt | Receiving | | |
| Mississippi State | Passing | | |
| Mississippi State | Rushing | | |
| Mississippi State | Receiving | | |

=== vs No. 3 Alabama ===
No. 3 Alabama Crimson Tide (7–2) at Vanderbilt Commodores (4–5) – Game summary

| Quarter | 1 | 2 | 3 | 4 | Total |
|---|---|---|---|---|---|
| No. 3 Crimson Tide | 0 | 7 | 14 | 0 | 21 |
| Commodores | 0 | 3 | 3 | 0 | 6 |

at FirstBank Stadium • Nashville, Tennessee

- Date: November 14
- TV announcers (SECN): Matt Schumacker, Aaron Murray, and Taylor Davis

| Statistics | ALA | VAN |
|---|---|---|
| First downs | | |
| Plays–yards | | |
| Rushes–yards | | |
| Passing yards | | |
| Passing: comp–att–int | | |
| Time of possession | | |

| Team | Category | Player | Statistics |
|---|---|---|---|
| Alabama | Passing | | |
| Alabama | Rushing | | |
| Alabama | Receiving | | |
| Vanderbilt | Passing | | |
| Vanderbilt | Rushing | | |
| Vanderbilt | Receiving | | |

=== at No. 24 Florida ===
Vanderbilt Commodores (4–6) at No. 24 Florida Gators (6–4) – Game summary

| Quarter | 1 | 2 | Total |
|---|---|---|---|
| Commodores | | | 0 |
| No. 24 Gators | | | 0 |

at Ben Hill Griffin Stadium • Gainesville, Florida

- Date: November 21

| Statistics | VAN | FLA |
|---|---|---|
| First downs | | |
| Plays–yards | | |
| Rushes–yards | | |
| Passing yards | | |
| Passing: comp–att–int | | |
| Time of possession | | |

| Team | Category | Player | Statistics |
|---|---|---|---|
| Vanderbilt | Passing | | |
| Vanderbilt | Rushing | | |
| Vanderbilt | Receiving | | |
| Florida | Passing | | |
| Florida | Rushing | | |
| Florida | Receiving | | |

=== vs Tennessee (rivalry) ===
Tennessee Volunteers (0–0) at Vanderbilt Commodores (0–0) – Game summary

| Quarter | 1 | 2 | Total |
|---|---|---|---|
| Volunteers | | | 0 |
| Commodores | | | 0 |

at FirstBank Stadium • Nashville, Tennessee

- Date: November 28

| Statistics | TENN | VAN |
|---|---|---|
| First downs | | |
| Plays–yards | | |
| Rushes–yards | | |
| Passing yards | | |
| Passing: comp–att–int | | |
| Time of possession | | |

| Team | Category | Player | Statistics |
|---|---|---|---|
| Tennessee | Passing | | |
| Tennessee | Rushing | | |
| Tennessee | Receiving | | |
| Vanderbilt | Passing | | |
| Vanderbilt | Rushing | | |
| Vanderbilt | Receiving | | |

== Roster ==
2026 Vanderbilt Commodores football team roster
Players
Coaches
Offense

| Pos. | # | Name | Class |
|---|---|---|---|
| WR | 0 | Junior Sherrill | Sr |
| QB | 1 | Blaze Berlowitz | Sr |
| QB | 2 | Jared Curtis | Fr |
| WR | 5 | Tristen Brown | Jr |
| WR | 9 | Brycen Coleman | Jr |
| QB | 10 | Whit Muschamp | Jr |
| QB | 11 | Jack Elliott | So |
| TE | 12 | Walter Taylor | Sr |
| WR | 13 | Kayleb Barnett | So |
| WR | 14 | Ja'Corey Thomas | Jr |
| WR | 15 | Joseph McVay | Jr |
| TE | 16 | Cole Spence | GS |
| WR | 17 | Cole Adams | GS |
| TE | 18 | Jayvontay Conner | Jr |
| RB | 20 | Izayah Lee | Fr |
| RB | 22 | Makhilyn Young | Sr |
| RB | 23 | Evan Hampton | Fr |
| RB | 24 | Gabe Fields | So |
| RB | 28 | Sedrick Alexander | Sr |
| RB | 41 | Jamezell Lassiter | Jr |
| RB | 42 | Jake Balis | Jr |
| FB, TE | 44 | Gabe Fisher | Sr |
| TE | 45 | Maurice Veney | Jr |
| TE | 49 | Elijah Rooney | Jr |
| OL | 50 | Gunner Givens | Sr |
| OL | 51 | Clinton Azubuike | Jr |
| OL | 52 | Kevo Wesley | GS |
| OL | 54 | Tripp Skewes | Fr |
| OL | 55 | George Williams-Haseotes | Fr |
| OL | 56 | Lyndon Cooper | GS |
| OL | 57 | Max Fisher | Sr |
| OL | 58 | Orion Irving | Sr |
| OL | 62 | CJ Williams | Jr |
| OL | 65 | Micah DeBose | So |
| OL | 70 | Cade McConnell | Sr |
| OL | 71 | Ted Gregoire | Sr |
| OL | 72 | Mitchell Smith | Fr |
| OL | 73 | Pulelei'ite Primus | Fr |
| OL | 75 | Beau Johnson | Jr |
| OL | 77 | Michael Smith | Jr |
| OL | 78 | Keegan Wechsler | Sr |
| WR | 80 | Claiborne Richards | Sr |
| WR | 81 | Kahden Smith | Fr |
| TE | 82 | Adam Gehm | Fr |
| WR | 84 | Owen Cabell | Fr |
| WR | 85 | Lebron Hill | So |
| TE | 86 | Tilden Riley | Fr |
| WR | 87 | Ty Burd | Sr |
| WR | 88 | Wils Jackson | So |
| WR | 89 | Cameran Dickson | So |

Defense

| Pos. | # | Name | Class |
|---|---|---|---|
| CB | 0 | Cobey Sellers | So |
| S | 1 | Dontae Carter | Jr |
| CB | 2 | Jaylin Lackey | Jr |
| S | 3 | Carson Lawrence | So |
| CB, WR | 4 | Martel Hight | Sr |
| DL | 5 | Issa Ouattara | GS |
| CB | 6 | Jordan Matthews | Sr |
| S | 7 | Ricardo Jones | Jr |
| S | 8 | CJ Heard | Jr |
| EDGE | 10 | Brian Allen Jr. | GS |
| LB | 11 | Bryan Longwell | Sr |
| S | 12 | Vanzale Hinton | So |
| LB | 13 | Tate Hamby | Jr |
| S | 14 | Jailen Ruth | Jr |
| DT | 15 | Mike Diatta | GS |
| CB | 16 | Jaylin Davies | GS |
| EDGE | 17 | Edwin Kolenge | GS |
| S | 18 | Jalen Gilbert | Sr |
| EDGE | 19 | CJ Jackson | Jr |
| LB | 20 | Jamison Curtis | Jr |
| S | 21 | Davin Chandler | So |
| LB | 22 | Bryce Cowan | Sr |
| LB | 24 | Nick Rinaldi | GS |
| S | 25 | Mason Lewis | Fr |
| CB | 26 | Cayden Daniels | So |
| S | 27 | Bradley Brown | Fr |
| S | 28 | Thomas Jones | So |
| EDGE | 29 | Miles Capers | GS |
| LB | 30 | Austin Howard | So |
| EDGE | 32 | Mason Carter | Jr |
| S | 35 | Payne Daniel | Sr |
| LB | 36 | Josiah Broxton | So |
| CB | 37 | Jack Wanzung | So |
| CB | 42 | Blaine McClure | Jr |
| LB | 43 | Luke D'Alise | Jr |
| LB | 44 | Daniel Vollmer Jr. | Fr |
| LB | 45 | Ty Bartholomew | Sr |
| CB | 46 | Mustafa Dannett | GS |
| DL | 49 | Simeon Boulware | Jr |
| DL | 53 | Glenn Seabrooks III | Jr |
| DL | 55 | Aaron Bryant | Sr |
| EDGE | 90 | Jake Stanish | So |
| DL | 92 | Jaylon Stone | Sr |
| DL | 93 | Nikhil Jefferson | So |
| DL | 94 | Bradley Mann | GS |
| EDGE | 95 | Jace McCallum | Fr |
| DL | 97 | Hayden Bray | GS |
| DT | 98 | Daryl Campbell | Fr |
| DL | 99 | Talan Carter | So |

Special teams

| Pos. | # | Name | Class |
|---|---|---|---|
| K | 47 | Justin Dewers | So |
| LS | 53 | Stone Owens | So |
| LS | 54 | Kaden Schickel | GS |
| P | 79 | Conor Weasler | Sr |
| K | 88 | Brock Taylor | Sr |

Head coach

- Clark Lea
  Head coach

Coordinators/assistant coaches

- Jerry Kill
  Chief consultant to the head coach/
  Senior offensive advisor
- Tim Beck
  Offensive coordinator
- Steve Gregory
  Defensive coordinator
- Nick Lezynski
  Co-defensive coordinator/Linebackers
- Jeff LePak
  Special teams coordinator/Halfbacks
- Ghaali Muhammad-Lankford
  Run game coordinator/Running backs
- Adam Morris
  Run game coordinator/defensive ends
- Alex Bailey
  Pass game coordinator/Wide receivers
- Seth Payne
  Defensive line
- Jovan Haye
  Defensive tackles
- Melvin Rice
  Safeties
- Jamaal Richardson
  Cornerbacks
- Chris Klenakis
  Offensive line
- Jeff Nady
  Offensive tackles
- Brendan Flaherty
  Tight ends
- Arion Shinaver
  Stars/Nickels
- Trenton Kirklin
  Quarterbacks
- Shane Gallant
  Specialists/Assistant special teams
- Josh Adams
  Assistant running backs/offensive analyst
- Carson Casarahi
  Assistant quarterbacks
- Andrew Gachkar
  Assistant nickels
- Justin Harris
  Assistant cornerbacks
- Jackson Lampley
  Assistant offensive line
- Adetokunbo Ogundeji
  Assistant defensive line
- Isaiah Richardson
  Assistant safeties
- DJ Steward
  Assistant wide receivers
- Jaxon York
  Assistant linebackers
- Bob Shoop
  Senior defensive analyst
- Terry Szucs
  Advanced scout - defense
- Lance Zeno
  Advanced scout - offense
- Mark Seidler
  Quality control - defense

Legend

- (C) Team captain
- (S) Suspended
- (I) Ineligible
- Injured
- Redshirt

Roster
Last update: June 19, 2026
