= Jared Curtis (American football) =

American football player

No. 2 – Vanderbilt Commodores
- Position: Quarterback
- Class: Freshman

Personal information
- Born: December 21, 2006 (age 19); Nashville, Tennessee, U.S.
- Listed height: 6 ft 3 in (1.91 m)
- Listed weight: 230 lb (104 kg)

Career information
- High school: Nashville Christian School (Nashville, Tennessee)
- College: Vanderbilt (2026–present)

Jared Curtis is an American college football quarterback for the Vanderbilt Commodores.

== Early life ==
Curtis was born in Nashville, Tennessee and attended Nashville Christian School. As a sophomore in 2023, he passed for 2,522 yards with 25 touchdowns and nine interceptions and rushed for 503 yards with 13 touchdowns. As a junior in 2024, he completed 179 of 255 passes for 2,830 yards with 40 touchdowns and three interceptions and added 637 rushing yards and 18 touchdowns. He led his team to a State Championship and was named the Tennessee Gatorade Football Player of the Year and Tennessee Mr. Football.

A five-star recruit, Curtis is one of the top quarterback and overall recruits in the class of 2026. In March 2024, he committed to the University of Georgia to play college football before decommitting in October of that year. He then recommitted to Georgia in May 2025. On December 2, 2025, Curtis flipped his commitment to Vanderbilt University. He signed his letter of intent the following day, becoming Vanderbilt's highest-ranked recruit in school history.

In the 2025 Tennessee Division II Class A state championship on December 4, Curtis went 15-of-20 passing for 254 yards and five touchdowns with 77 rushing yards and a rushing touchdown, guiding Nashville Christian to a 59–7 victory and a second consecutive state championship.

== College career ==
Curtis entered his true freshman season competing with Blaze Berlowitz for the starting quarterback position. Head coach Clark Lea named Berlowitz the starter but said Curtis would still see playing time. In the 2026 season opener against Austin Peay, Curtis made his collegiate debut, completing seven of nine passes for 60 yards in the victory. The following week against Delaware, Curtis completed 14 of 22 passes for 210 yards and a touchdown while rushing for two touchdowns in a 35–26 victory. Following the game, Lea named Curtis the team's starting quarterback moving forward, ahead of their Week 3 matchup against NC State.

=== Statistics ===
Year	Team	Games			Passing								Rushing			
Year	Team	GP	GS	Record	Cmp	Att	Pct	Yds	Y/A	TD	Int	Rtg	Att	Yds	Avg	TD
2026	Vanderbilt	7	5	1–4	128	197	65.0	1,489	7.6	8	8	133.7	63	150	2.4	2
Career		7	5	1–4	128	197	65.0	1,489	7.6	8	8	133.7	63	150	2.4	2
