= 2024 Vanderbilt Commodores football team =

American college football season

2024 Vanderbilt Commodores football

Birmingham Bowl champion

Birmingham Bowl, W 35–27 vs. Georgia Tech
- Conference: Southeastern Conference
- Record: 7–6 (3–5 SEC)
- Head coach: Clark Lea (4th season)
- Offensive coordinator: Tim Beck (1st season)
- Offensive scheme: Pistol
- Co-defensive coordinator: Steve Gregory (1st season)
- Base defense: 4–2–5
- Home stadium: FirstBank Stadium

2024 Southeastern Conference football standings
| | Conf. | | | Overall |
| Team | W | | L | W | | L |
|---|---|---|---|---|---|---|
| No. 4 Texas y^ | 7 | – | 1 | 13 | – | 3 |
| No. 6 Georgia y$^ | 6 | – | 2 | 11 | – | 3 |
| No. 9 Tennessee ^ | 6 | – | 2 | 10 | – | 3 |
| No. 22 Missouri | 5 | – | 3 | 10 | – | 3 |
| No. 11 Ole Miss | 5 | – | 3 | 10 | – | 3 |
| No. 17 Alabama | 5 | – | 3 | 9 | – | 4 |
| No. 19 South Carolina | 5 | – | 3 | 9 | – | 4 |
| LSU | 5 | – | 3 | 9 | – | 4 |
| Texas A&M | 5 | – | 3 | 8 | – | 5 |
| Florida | 4 | – | 4 | 8 | – | 5 |
| Arkansas | 3 | – | 5 | 7 | – | 6 |
| Vanderbilt | 3 | – | 5 | 7 | – | 6 |
| Oklahoma | 2 | – | 6 | 6 | – | 7 |
| Auburn | 2 | – | 6 | 5 | – | 7 |
| Kentucky | 1 | – | 7 | 4 | – | 8 |
| Mississippi State | 0 | – | 8 | 2 | – | 10 |
Championship: Georgia 22, Texas 19 ^{OT}
^ – College Football Playoff participant; $ – Conference champion; y – Championship game participant; Rankings from AP Poll

The 2024 Vanderbilt Commodores football team represented Vanderbilt University as a member of the Southeastern Conference (SEC) during the 2024 NCAA Division I FBS football season. The Commodores were led by Clark Lea in his fourth year as their head coach.

The team is best known for its game on October 5, 2024, where Vanderbilt beat No. 1 Alabama 40–35. They gained their first victory over the Crimson Tide in 40 years, as well as their first ever win over an AP top 5 opponent after going 0–60 all time against them prior to that matchup. Their fans carried the South end zone goalposts 2.9 miles through downtown Nashville and Broadway before dumping them in the Cumberland River across from Nissan Stadium. Fans made it past many road blocks by the Nashville Metropolitan PD, and even took a detour around Bridgestone Arena to avoid police. They were fined $100,000 by the SEC. The following week, Vanderbilt achieved another upset against double digit spread by beating the Kentucky Wildcats for their first win on the road of the season.

On October 20, the Commodores achieved their first AP Top 25 ranking for the first time since the end of the 2013 season, at No. 25.

The Commodores faced their historic rival Georgia Tech in the 2024 Birmingham Bowl. With the win over Georgia Tech, the Commodores won their first bowl game and secured their first winning season since 2013.

== Preseason ==
=== SEC media poll ===
The SEC media poll was released on July 19, 2024. The Commodores were predicted to finish 16th (last) in the conference, but also received two first-place votes.

| Predicted finish | Team | Votes (1st place) |
|---|---|---|
| 1 | Georgia | 3330 (165) |
| 2 | Texas | 3041 (27) |
| 3 | Alabama | 2891 (12) |
| 4 | Ole Miss | 2783 (4) |
| 5 | LSU | 2322 (2) |
| 6 | Missouri | 2240 |
| 7 | Tennessee | 2168 |
| 8 | Oklahoma | 2022 |
| 9 | Texas A&M | 1684 |
| 10 | Auburn | 1382 |
| 11 | Kentucky | 1371 |
| 12 | Florida | 1146 |
| 13 | South Carolina | 923 (1) |
| 14 | Arkansas | 749 |
| 15 | Mississippi State | 623 |
| 16 | Vanderbilt | 293 (2) |

First-place votes
| Rank | Team | Votes |
| 1 | Georgia | 165 |
| 2 | Texas | 27 |
| 3 | Alabama | 12 |
| 4 | Ole Miss | 4 |
| 5 | LSU | 2 |
| 6 | Vanderbilt | 2 |
| 7 | South Carolina | 1 |

=== Award watch lists ===
| Award | Player | Position | Year |
|---|---|---|---|
| Patrick Mannelly Award | Julian Ashby | LS | GS |
| Wuerffel Trophy | Richie Hoskins | WR | SR |
| Ray Guy Award | Jesse Mirco | P | GS |
| Bednarik Award | C. J. Taylor | LB | SR |

== Schedule ==
| Date | Time | Opponent | Rank | Site | TV | Result | Attendance |
|---|---|---|---|---|---|---|---|
| August 31 | 11:00 a.m. | Virginia Tech* | | FirstBank Stadium; Nashville, TN | ESPN | W 34–27 ^{OT} | 28,934 |
| September 7 | 6:30 p.m. | Alcorn State* | | FirstBank Stadium; Nashville, TN | ESPNU | W 55–0 | 24,080 |
| September 14 | 6:00 p.m. | at Georgia State* | | Center Parc Stadium; Atlanta, GA | ESPN+ | L 32–36 | 14,413 |
| September 21 | 3:15 p.m. | at No. 7 Missouri | | Faurot Field; Columbia, MO | SECN | L 27–30 ^{2OT} | 62,621 |
| October 5 | 3:15 p.m. | No. 1 Alabama | | FirstBank Stadium; Nashville, TN | SECN | W 40–35 | 28,934 |
| October 12 | 6:45 p.m. | at Kentucky | | Kroger Field; Lexington, KY (rivalry) | SECN | W 20–13 | 62,120 |
| October 19 | 6:00 p.m. | Ball State* | | FirstBank Stadium; Nashville, TN | SECN+/ESPN+ | W 24–14 | 27,884 |
| October 26 | 3:15 p.m. | No. 5 Texas | No. 25 | FirstBank Stadium; Nashville, TN | SECN | L 24–27 | 28,934 |
| November 2 | 11:45 a.m. | at Auburn | | Jordan–Hare Stadium; Auburn, AL | SECN | W 17–7 | 88,043 |
| November 9 | 3:15 p.m. | South Carolina^{†} | | FirstBank Stadium; Nashville, TN | SECN | L 7–28 | 28,934 |
| November 23 | 6:45 p.m. | at LSU | | Tiger Stadium; Baton Rouge, LA | SECN | L 17–24 | 102,086 |
| November 30 | 11:00 a.m. | No. 8 Tennessee | | FirstBank Stadium; Nashville, TN (rivalry) | ABC | L 23–36 | 28,934 |
| December 27 | 2:30 p.m. | vs. Georgia Tech* | | Protective Stadium; Birmingham, AL (Birmingham Bowl / rivalry) | ESPN | W 35–27 | 33,840 |
*Non-conference game; ^{†}Homecoming; Rankings from AP Poll (and CFP Rankings, after November 5) – Released prior to game; All times are in Central time

== Rankings ==
Ranking movements Legend: ██ Increase in ranking ██ Decrease in ranking — = Not ranked RV = Received votes
| | Week | | | | | | | | | | | | | | | | |
| Poll | Pre | 1 | 2 | 3 | 4 | 5 | 6 | 7 | 8 | 9 | 10 | 11 | 12 | 13 | 14 | 15 | Final |
|---|---|---|---|---|---|---|---|---|---|---|---|---|---|---|---|---|---|
| AP | — | RV | RV | — | — | — | RV | RV | 25 | RV | 24 | — | RV | — | — | — | — |
| Coaches | — | — | — | — | — | — | RV | RV | 25 | RV | 25 | — | RV | — | — | — | — |
| CFP | Not released | | | | | | | | | | — | — | — | — | — | — | Not released |

== Personnel ==
2024 Vanderbilt Commodores football team roster
Players
Coaches
Offense

| Pos. | # | Name | Class |
|---|---|---|---|
| WR | 0 | Junior Sherrill | So |
| WR | 1 | Dariyan Wiley | GS |
| QB | 2 | Diego Pavia | GS |
| WR | 3 | Quincy Skinner Jr. | Sr |
| WR | 5 | Richie Hoskins | Sr |
| QB | 7 | Drew Dickey | Jr |
| QB | 8 | Nate Johnson | Jr |
| TE | 9 | Eli Stowers | GS |
| QB | 10 | Whit Muschamp | Fr |
| WR | 11 | Loic Fouonji | GS |
| QB | 12 | Brennan Storer | So |
| RB | 13 | Chase Gillespie | Jr |
| QB | 14 | Jérémy St. Hilaire | Fr |
| WR | 15 | Jeremiah Dillon | Jr |
| TE | 16 | Cole Spence | Jr |
| QB | 18 | Hayden Moses | Sr |
| QB | 19 | Blaze Berlowitz | So |
| RB | 23 | A. J. Newberry | So |
| WR | 26 | Micah Bell | Jr |
| RB | 28 | Sedrick Alexander | So |
| RB | 33 | Moni Jones | GS |
| RB | 34 | Johann Cardenas | Fr |
| WR | 37 | Ty Burd | So |
| WR | 39 | Jackson Heis | So |
| WR | 41 | Jamezell Lassiter | Fr |
| RB | 42 | Jake Balis | Fr |
| RB | 43 | Dominic Rezac | Jr |
| FB, TE | 44 | Gabe Fisher | So |
| TE | 45 | Emmanuel Adebi | GS |
| RB | 47 | Isaiah Fontan | Jr |
| TE | 48 | Larry Benton III | Fr |
| TE | 49 | Elijah Rooney | Fr |
| OL | 50 | Chase Mitchell | GS |
| OL | 52 | Kevo Wesley | GS |
| OL | 54 | Steven Hubbard | GS |
| OL | 55 | Gunnar Hansen | Sr |
| OL | 57 | Max Fisher | So |
| OL | 60 | Duncan MacDonald | Jr |
| OL | 62 | C. J. Williams | Fr |
| OL | 64 | Delfin Xavier Castro | Sr |
| OL | 66 | Anthony Miles | So |
| OL | 68 | Steven Losoya | GS |
| OL | 69 | Cooper Starks | So |
| OL | 70 | Cade McConnell | Jr |
| OL | 71 | Gage Pitchford | GS |
| OL | 72 | Josh Raymond | Fr |
| OL | 73 | Charlie Clark | Sr |
| OL | 74 | Cameron Bosen | Fr |
| OL | 75 | Misael Sandoval | So |
| OL | 76 | Grayson Morgan | Jr |
| OL | 77 | David Siegel | Jr |
| OL | 78 | Keegan Wechsler | So |
| WR | 80 | Tristen Brown | Fr |
| WR | 81 | Hutch Baird | Sr |
| TE | 82 | Brycen Coleman | Fr |
| WR | 83 | Derek Kee | So |
| TE | 84 | Kamrean Johnson | So |
| WR | 85 | Landon Wells | Jr |
| WR | 86 | Witt Edwards | Fr |
| WR | 87 | Joseph McVay | Fr |
| WR | 88 | Boski Barrett | Fr |

Defense

| Pos. | # | Name | Class |
|---|---|---|---|
| DL | 0 | Aenesas DiCosmo | GS |
| S | 1 | C. J. Taylor | Sr |
| STAR | 2 | Randon Fontenette | So |
| LB | 4 | Bryan Longwell | So |
| DL | 5 | Yilanan Ouattara | Jr |
| CB | 6 | Kolbey Taylor | Sr |
| S | 7 | Marlen Sewell | Sr |
| CB | 8 | Tyson Russell | Sr |
| LB | 10 | Langston Patterson | Jr |
| EDGE | 11 | Darren Agu | Jr |
| STAR | 12 | Jeffrey Ugochukwu | Jr |
| S | 14 | Steven Sannieniola | Jr |
| DL | 15 | Zaylin Wood | Sr |
| CB | 17 | Mark Davis | GS |
| S | 18 | Jalen Gilbert | So |
| S | 19 | De'Rickey Wright | GS |
| LB | 20 | Prince Kollie | Sr |
| S | 21 | Dontae Carter | Fr |
| LB | 22 | Bryce Cowan | Jr |
| LB | 24 | Nick Rinaldi | Jr |
| CB | 25 | Martel Hight | So |
| CB | 26 | Alvin Williamson Jr. | Fr |
| CB | 27 | Jaylin Lackey | Fr |
| CB | 28 | Thomas Jones | Fr |
| EDGE | 29 | Miles Capers | Sr |
| CB | 30 | Trudell Berry | Jr |
| S | 31 | Tate Hamby | Fr |
| EDGE | 32 | Mason Carter | Fr |
| EDGE | 33 | Boubacar Diakite | Jr |
| STAR | 34 | Maurice Hampton | GS |
| S | 35 | Payne Daniel | So |
| CB | 36 | Alan Wright | Sr |
| EDGE | 37 | Jailen Ruth | So |
| STAR | 39 | Brail Lipford | GS |
| LB | 40 | Jamison Curtis | Fr |
| EDGE | 42 | Callahan Blair | Fr |
| LB | 45 | Ty Bartholomew | So |
| CB | 46 | Mustafa Dannett | Jr |
| DL | 49 | Simeon Boulware | Fr |
| DL | 53 | Glenn Seabrooks III | Fr |
| LB | 58 | Carson Casteel | Sr |
| DL | 63 | Jacob Katona | Sr |
| DL | 90 | Ted Gregoire | So |
| DL | 91 | Christian James | GS |
| DL | 92 | Evan Herrmann | So |
| DL | 94 | Bradley Mann | Jr |
| DL | 95 | Linus Zunk | Jr |
| DL | 96 | Khordae Sydnor | Sr |
| EDGE | 97 | Hayden Bray | GS |
| DL | 98 | De'Marion Thomas | So |
| DL | 99 | Devin Lee | Sr |

Special teams

| Pos. | # | Name | Class |
|---|---|---|---|
| P | 29 | Jesse Mirco | GS |
| K | 38 | Will Faris | Sr |
| K | 40 | Mason Rohmiller | Jr |
| K | 43 | Will Conley | GS |
| LS | 48 | Julian Ashby | GS |
| LS | 51 | Daniel Gaw | Sr |
| P | 79 | Conor Weasler | So |
| K | 88 | Brock Taylor | So |

Head coach

- Clark Lea
  Head coach/Defensive coordinator

Coordinators/assistant coaches

- Jerry Kill
  Chief consultant to the head coach/
  Senior offensive advisor
- Tim Beck
  Offensive coordinator
- Steve Gregory
  Associate defensive coordinator/Secondary
- Nick Lezynski
  Defensive run game coordinator/Linebackers
- Jeff LePak
  Special teams coordinator/Tight ends
- Ghaali Muhammad-Lankford
  Run game coordinator/Running backs
- Jovan Haye
  Defensive ends
- Larry Black
  Defensive line
- Alex Bailey
  Wide receivers
- Melvin Rice
  Safeties
- Jamaal Richardson
  Cornerbacks
- Chris Klenakis
  Offensive line
- Brendan Flaherty
  Tight ends
- Jimmy Thompson
  Stars
- Garrett Altman
  Quarterbacks
- Seth Payne
  Assistant defensive line/Pass rush specialist
- Shane Gallant
  Specialists/Assistant special teams
- Josh Adams
  Assistant running backs
- Dylan Autenrieth
  Assistant offensive line
- Arion Shinaver
  Assistant safeties
- Justin Harris
  Assistant cornerbacks
- Jafar Williams
  Assistant wide receivers

Legend

- (C) Team captain
- (S) Suspended
- (I) Ineligible
- Injured
- Redshirt

Roster
Last update: September 3, 2024

== Game summaries ==
=== Virginia Tech ===
Virginia Tech Hokies at Vanderbilt Commodores – Game summary

| Quarter | 1 | 2 | 3 | 4 | OT | Total |
|---|---|---|---|---|---|---|
| Hokies | 0 | 3 | 10 | 14 | 0 | 27 |
| Commodores | 3 | 14 | 3 | 7 | 7 | 34 |

at FirstBank Stadium, Nashville, Tennessee

- Date: August 31
- Game time: 11:00 a.m. CDT
- Game weather: Sunny, 88 °F (31 °C)
- Game attendance: 28,934
- Referee: Stuart Mullins
- TV announcers (ESPN): Roy Philpott, Sam Acho, and Taylor Davis
- Box score, Recap

Game information
First quarter
- VAN – Brock Taylor 43-yard field goal, 8:27. Commodores 3–0. Drive: 11 plays, 50 yards, 6:33.

Second quarter

- VAN – Quincy Skinner Jr. 14-yard pass from Diego Pavia (Brock Taylor kick), 14:45. Commodores 10–0. Drive: 7 plays, 27 yards, 4:09.
- VAN – Sedrick Alexander 7-yard run (Brock Taylor kick), 5:18. Commodores 17–0. Drive: 11 plays, 80 yards, 7:14.
- VT – John Love 40-yard field goal, 0:52. Commodores 17–3. Drive: 13 plays, 44 yards, 4:26.

Third quarter

- VT – Bhayshul Tuten 24-yard run (John Love kick), 12:42. Commodores 17–10. Drive: 6 plays, 83 yards, 2:18.
- VAN – Brock Taylor 53-yard field goal, 7:07. Commodores 20–10. Drive: 9 plays, 40 yards, 5:35.
- VT – Jone Love 38-yard field goal, 0:34. Commodores 20–13. Drive: 7 plays, 50 yards, 2:57.

Fourth quarter

- VT – Bhayshul Tuten 11-yard pass from Kyron Drones (John Love kick), 10:12. Tied 20–20. Drive: 7 plays, 76 yards, 2:58.
- VT – Ali Jennings 62-yard pass from Kyron Drones (John Love kick), 4:21. Hokies 27–20. Drive: 6 plays, 97 yards, 3:17.
- VAN – Sedrick Alexander 8-yard pass from Diego Pavia (Brock Taylor kick), 1:51. Tied 27–27. Drive: 6 plays, 70 yards, 2:30.

Overtime

- VAN – Diego Pavia 4-yard run (Brock Taylor kick). Commodores 34–27. Drive: 4 plays, 25 yards.

| Statistics | VT | VAN |
|---|---|---|
| First downs | 21 | 20 |
| Total yards | 322 | 371 |
| Rushing yards | 75 | 181 |
| Passing yards | 322 | 190 |
| Turnovers | 1 | 0 |
| Time of possession | 25:28 | 34:32 |

| Team | Category | Player | Statistics |
|---|---|---|---|
| Virginia Tech | Passing | Kyron Drones | 22/33, 322 yards, 2 TD, INT |
| Virginia Tech | Rushing | Bhayshul Tuten | 9 rushes, 34 yards, TD |
| Virginia Tech | Receiving | Ali Jennings | 2 receptions, 91 yards, TD |
| Vanderbilt | Passing | Diego Pavia | 12/16, 190 yards, 2 TD |
| Vanderbilt | Rushing | Diego Pavia | 26 rushes, 104 yards, TD |
| Vanderbilt | Receiving | Quincy Skinner Jr. | 4 receptions, 72 yards, TD |

=== Alcorn State ===
Alcorn State Braves at Vanderbilt Commodores – Game summary

| Quarter | 1 | 2 | 3 | 4 | Total |
|---|---|---|---|---|---|
| Braves | 0 | 0 | 0 | 0 | 0 |
| Commodores | 10 | 17 | 7 | 21 | 55 |

at FirstBank Stadium, Nashville, Tennessee

- Date: September 7
- Game time: 6:30 p.m. CDT
- Game weather: Sunny, 74 °F (23 °C)
- Game attendance: 24,080
- Referee: Daniel Dautreaux
- TV announcers (ESPNU): Kevin Fitzgerald and Charlie Strong
- Box score, Recap

Game information
First quarter
- VAN – Brock Taylor 35-yard field goal, 5:15. Commodores 3–0. Drive: 12 plays, 53 yards, 7:55.
- VAN – Cole Spence 17-yard pass from Eli Stowers (Brock Taylor kick), 2:40. Commodores 10–0. Drive: 1 play, 17 yards, 0:06.

Second quarter

- VAN – Diego Pavia 5-yard run (Brock Taylor kick), 9:26. Commodores 17–0. Drive: 7 plays, 46 yards, 4:20.
- VAN – Sedrick Alexander 2-yard run (Brock Taylor kick), 5:02. Commodores 24–0. Drive: 6 plays, 34 yards, 3:12.
- VAN – Brock Taylor 46-yard field goal, 0:05. Commodores 27–0. Drive: 10 plays, 27 yards, 2:20.

Third quarter

- VAN – A. J. Newberry 20-yard run (Brock Taylor kick), 2:37. Commodores 34–0. Drive: 6 plays, 52 yards, 3:54.

Fourth quarter

- VAN – Nate Johnson 56-yard run (Brock Taylor kick), 14:06. Commodores 41–0. Drive: 1 play, 56 yards, 0:10.
- VAN – Martel Hight 57-yard punt return (Brock Taylor kick), 12:17. Commodores 48–0.
- VAN – Alan Wright 18-yard interception return (Brock Taylor kick), 12:11. Commodores 55–0.

| Statistics | ALCN | VAN |
|---|---|---|
| First downs | 6 | 18 |
| Total yards | 71 | 342 |
| Rushing yards | 40 | 242 |
| Passing yards | 31 | 100 |
| Turnovers | 2 | 0 |
| Time of possession | 28:57 | 31:03 |

| Team | Category | Player | Statistics |
|---|---|---|---|
| Alcorn State | Passing | Xzavier Vaughn | 5/9, 20 yards |
| Alcorn State | Rushing | Cameron Stewart | 10 rushes, 29 yards |
| Alcorn State | Receiving | Tavarious Griffin | 2 receptions, 14 yards |
| Vanderbilt | Passing | Diego Pavia | 10/13, 83 yards |
| Vanderbilt | Rushing | Nate Johnson | 2 rushes, 69 yards, TD |
| Vanderbilt | Receiving | Tristen Brown | 3 receptions, 27 yards |

=== At Georgia State ===
Vanderbilt Commodores at Georgia State Panthers – Game summary

| Quarter | 1 | 2 | 3 | 4 | Total |
|---|---|---|---|---|---|
| Commodores | 0 | 10 | 0 | 22 | 32 |
| Panthers | 3 | 9 | 10 | 14 | 36 |

at Center Parc Stadium, Atlanta, Georgia

- Date: September 14
- Game time: 6:00 p.m. CDT/7:00 p.m. EDT
- Game weather: Sunny
- Game attendance: 14,413
- Referee: Matt Loeffler
- TV announcers (ESPN+): Matt Stewart and Sam Crenshaw
- Box score, Recap

Game information
First quarter
- GAST – Liam Rickman 24-yard field goal, 11:16. Panthers 3–0. Drive: 7 plays, 14 yards, 2:04.

Second quarter

- VAN – Brock Taylor 28-yard field goal, 12:28. Tied 3–3. Drive: 14 plays, 64 yards, 6:36.
- GAST – Ted Hurst 33-yard pass from Christian Veilleux (Liam Rickman kick), 7:40. Panthers 10–3. Drive: 9 plays, 75 yards, 4:48.
- GAST – Team safety, 7:39. Panthers 12–3.
- VAN – Junior Sherrill 8-yard pass from Diego Pavia (Brock Taylor kick), 0:46. Panthers 12–10. Drive: 6 plays, 73 yards, 1:14.

Third quarter

- GAST – Liam Rickman 45-yard field goal, 10:22. Panthers 15–10. Drive: 11 plays, 48 yards, 4:38.
- GAST – Rykem Laney 12-yard pass from Christian Veilleux (Liam Rickman kick), 3:23. Panthers 22–10. Drive: 8 plays, 73 yards, 3:20.

Fourth quarter

- VAN – Eli Stowers 18-yard pass from Diego Pavia (Brock Taylor kick), 14:07. Panthers 22–17. Drive: 6 plays, 37 yards, 3:10.
- GAST – Christian Veilleux 18-yard run (Liam Rickman kick), 11:42. Panthers 29–17. Drive: 7 plays, 78 yards, 2:21.
- VAN – A. J. Newberry 3-yard run (Brock Taylor kick), 2:29. Panthers 29–24. Drive: 8 plays, 65 yards, 2:25.
- VAN – Sedrick Alexander 1-yard run (Diego Pavia pass to Sedrick Alexander), 1:14. Commodores 32–29. Drive: 3 plays, 39 yards, 0:49.
- GAST – Ted Hurst 25-yard pass from Veilleux (Liam Rickman kick), 0:15. Panthers 36–32. Drive: 7 plays, 75 yards, 0:59.

| Statistics | VAN | GAST |
|---|---|---|
| First downs | 23 | 25 |
| Total yards | 380 | 426 |
| Rushing yards | 110 | 157 |
| Passing yards | 270 | 269 |
| Turnovers | 1 | 1 |
| Time of possession | 27:13 | 32:47 |

| Team | Category | Player | Statistics |
|---|---|---|---|
| Vanderbilt | Passing | Diego Pavia | 18/33, 270 yards, 2 TD |
| Vanderbilt | Rushing | Sedrick Alexander | 11 rushes, 42 yards, TD |
| Vanderbilt | Receiving | Eli Stowers | 9 receptions, 110 yards, TD |
| Georgia State | Passing | Christian Veilleux | 26/41, 269 yards, 3 TD, INT |
| Georgia State | Rushing | Freddie Brock | 15 rushes, 96 yards |
| Georgia State | Receiving | Ted Hurst | 7 receptions, 128 yards, 2 TD |

=== At No. 7 Missouri ===
Vanderbilt Commodores at No. 7 Missouri Tigers – Game summary

| Quarter | 1 | 2 | 3 | 4 | OT | 2OT | Total |
|---|---|---|---|---|---|---|---|
| Commodores | 7 | 6 | 7 | 0 | 7 | 0 | 27 |
| No. 7 Tigers | 7 | 3 | 10 | 0 | 7 | 3 | 30 |

at Faurot Field, Columbia, Missouri

- Date: September 21
- Game time: 3:15 p.m. CDT
- Game weather: Mostly cloudy, 75 °F (24 °C)
- Game attendance: 62,621
- Referee: Jason Autrey
- TV announcers (SECN): Taylor Zarzour, Matt Stinchcomb, and Alyssa Lang
- Box score, Recap

Game information
First quarter
- VAN – Joseph McVay 65-yard pass from Diego Pavia (Brock Taylor kick), 9:06. Commodores 7–0. Drive: 4 plays, 92 yards, 1:55.
- MIZZ – Luther Burden III 20-yard pass from Brady Cook (Blake Craig kick), 3:51. Tied 7–7. Drive: 10 plays, 76 yards, 5:06.

Second quarter

- VAN – Brock Taylor 27-yard field goal, 13:27. Commodores 10–7. Drive: 10 plays, 66 yards, 5:24.
- MIZZ – Blake Craig 23-yard field goal, 1:17. Tied 10–10. Drive: 9 plays, 47 yards, 3:06.
- VAN – Brock Taylor 57-yard field goal, 0:00. Commodores 13–10. Drive: 2 plays, 4 yards, 0:08.

Third quarter

- MIZZ – Blake Craig 54-yard field goal, 10:58. Tied 13–13. Drive: 9 plays, 21 yards, 3:56.
- MIZZ – Marcus Carroll 3-yard run (Blake Craig kick), 8:18. Tigers 20–13. Drive: 4 plays, 75 yards, 1:03.
- VAN – A. J. Newberry 4-yard run (Brock Taylor kick), 0:21. Tied 20–20. Drive: 8 plays, 80 yards, 5:08.

Fourth quarter

- No scoring plays

Overtime

- VAN – Gabe Fisher 2-yard pass from Diego Pavia (Brock Taylor kick). Commodores 27–20. Drive: 4 plays, 25 yards.
- MIZZ – Luther Burden III 25-yard pass from Brady Cook (Blake Craig kick). Tied 27–27. Drive: 1 play, 25 yards.

Second overtime

- MIZZ – Blake Craig 37-yard field goal. Tigers 30–27. Drive: 4 plays, 5 yards.

| Statistics | VAN | MIZZ |
|---|---|---|
| First downs | 15 | 22 |
| Total yards | 324 | 442 |
| Rushing yards | 146 | 216 |
| Passing yards | 178 | 226 |
| Turnovers | 0 | 0 |
| Time of possession | 26:54 | 33:06 |

| Team | Category | Player | Statistics |
|---|---|---|---|
| Vanderbilt | Passing | Diego Pavia | 14/23, 178 yards, 2 TD |
| Vanderbilt | Rushing | Diego Pavia | 17 rushes, 84 yards |
| Vanderbilt | Receiving | Joseph McVay | 1 reception, 65 yards, TD |
| Missouri | Passing | Brady Cook | 23/37, 226 yards, 2 TD |
| Missouri | Rushing | Nate Noel | 24 rushes, 199 yards |
| Missouri | Receiving | Luther Burden III | 6 receptions, 76 yards, 2 TD |

=== No. 1 Alabama ===
No. 1 Alabama Crimson Tide at Vanderbilt Commodores – Game summary

| Quarter | 1 | 2 | 3 | 4 | Total |
|---|---|---|---|---|---|
| No. 1 Crimson Tide | 7 | 7 | 14 | 7 | 35 |
| Commodores | 13 | 10 | 7 | 10 | 40 |

at FirstBank Stadium, Nashville, Tennessee

- Date: October 5
- Game time: 3:15 p.m. CDT
- Game weather: Sunny, 85 °F (29 °C)
- Game attendance: 28,934
- Referee: Lee Hendrick
- TV announcers (SECN): Tom Hart, Cole Cubelic, and Alyssa Lang
- Box score, Recap

Game information
First quarter
- VAN – Sedrick Alexander 7-yard run (Brock Taylor kick), 8:46. Commodores 7–0. Drive: 10 plays, 75 yards, 6:14.
- VAN – Randon Fontenette 29-yard interception return (kick failed), 8:03. Commodores 13–0.
- ALA – Jam Miller 8-yard run (Graham Nicholson kick), 4:22. Commodores 13–7. Drive: 7 plays, 75 yards, 3:41.

Second quarter

- VAN – Sedrick Alexander 1-yard run (Brock Taylor kick), 9:32. Commodores 20–7. Drive: 17 plays, 75 yards, 9:50.
- VAN – Brock Taylor 51-yard field goal, 4:10. Commodores 23–7. Drive: 8 plays, 26 yards, 4:02.
- ALA – Jam Miller 3-yard run (Graham Nicholson kick), 1:25. Commodores 23–14. Drive: 9 plays, 83 yards, 2:41.

Third quarter

- ALA – Jalen Milroe 14-yard run (Graham Nicholson kick), 12:01. Commodores 23–21. Drive: 5 plays, 53 yards, 2:51.
- VAN – Junior Sherrill 36-yard pass from Diego Pavia (Brock Taylor kick), 2:53. Commodores 30–21. Drive: 4 plays, 45 yards, 2:13.
- ALA – Ryan Coleman-Williams 58-yard pass from Jalen Milroe (Graham Nicholson kick), 1:01. Commodores 30–28. Drive: 4 plays, 75 yards, 1:52.

Fourth quarter

- VAN – Brock Taylor 33-yard field goal, 10:35. Commodores 33–28. Drive: 9 plays, 60 yards, 5:26.
- VAN – Kamrean Johnson 6-yard pass from Diego Pavia (Brock Taylor kick), 5:07. Commodores 40–28. Drive: 7 plays, 53 yards, 4:29.
- ALA – Ryan Coleman-Williams 2-yard run (Graham Nicholson kick), 2:46. Commodores 40–35. Drive: 8 plays, 75 yards, 2:21.

| Statistics | ALA | VAN |
|---|---|---|
| First downs | 17 | 26 |
| Total yards | 394 | 418 |
| Rushing yards | 84 | 166 |
| Passing yards | 310 | 252 |
| Turnovers | 2 | 0 |
| Time of possession | 17:52 | 42:08 |

| Team | Category | Player | Statistics |
|---|---|---|---|
| Alabama | Passing | Jalen Milroe | 18/24, 310 yards, TD, INT |
| Alabama | Rushing | Jam Miller | 5 rushes, 45 yards, 2 TD |
| Alabama | Receiving | Ryan Coleman-Williams | 3 receptions, 82 yards, TD |
| Vanderbilt | Passing | Diego Pavia | 16/20, 252 yards, 2 TD |
| Vanderbilt | Rushing | Sedrick Alexander | 21 rushes, 64 yards, 2 TD |
| Vanderbilt | Receiving | Eli Stowers | 6 receptions, 113 yards |

This was Vanderbilt's first win over Alabama since 1984 and its first win against the Crimson Tide in Nashville since 1969. This was also the Commodores first win over a AP Top 5 opponent in program history.

=== At Kentucky ===
Vanderbilt Commodores at Kentucky Wildcats – Game summary

| Quarter | 1 | 2 | 3 | 4 | Total |
|---|---|---|---|---|---|
| Commodores | 7 | 7 | 3 | 3 | 20 |
| Wildcats | 0 | 7 | 0 | 6 | 13 |

at Kroger Field, Lexington, Kentucky

- Date: October 12
- Game time: 6:45 p.m. CDT/7:45 p.m. EDT
- Game weather: Clear, 70 °F (21 °C)
- Game attendance: 62,120
- Referee: Jason Autrey
- TV announcers (SECN): Tom Hart, Jordan Rodgers, and Cole Cubelic
- Box score, Recap

Game information
First quarter
- VAN – A. J. Newberry 20-yard pass from Diego Pavia (Brock Taylor kick), 4:50. Commodores 7–0. Drive: 9 plays, 97 yards, 4:52.

Second quarter

- UK – Demie Sumo-Karngbaye 1-yard run (Alex Raynor kick), 13:42. Tied 7–7. Drive: 12 plays, 78 yards, 6:02.
- VAN – Richie Hoskins 18-yard pass from Diego Pavia (Brock Taylor kick), 0:13. Commodores 14–7. Drive: 6 plays, 60 yards, 1:22.

Third quarter

- VAN – Brock Taylor 49-yard field goal, 7:51. Commodores 17–7. Drive: 11 plays, 44 yards, 7:09.

Fourth quarter

- VAN – Brock Taylor 50-yard field goal, 8:47. Commodores 20–7. Drive: 12 plays, 58 yards, 8:03.
- UK – Dane Key 22-yard pass from Brock Vandagriff (run failed), 7:02. Commodores 20–13. Drive: 6 plays, 75 yards, 1:45.

| Statistics | VAN | UK |
|---|---|---|
| First downs | 19 | 23 |
| Total yards | 288 | 322 |
| Rushing yards | 145 | 164 |
| Passing yards | 143 | 158 |
| Turnovers | 1 | 2 |
| Time of possession | 34:35 | 25:25 |

| Team | Category | Player | Statistics |
|---|---|---|---|
| Vanderbilt | Passing | Diego Pavia | 15/18, 143 yards, 2 TD, INT |
| Vanderbilt | Rushing | Sedrick Alexander | 11 rushes, 58 yards |
| Vanderbilt | Receiving | Richie Hoskins | 3 receptions, 44 yards, TD |
| Kentucky | Passing | Brock Vandagriff | 15/25, 158 yards, TD |
| Kentucky | Rushing | Demie Sumo-Karngbaye | 12 rushes, 59 yards, TD |
| Kentucky | Receiving | Dane Key | 8 receptions, 83 yards, TD |

=== Ball State ===
Ball State Cardinals at Vanderbilt Commodores – Game summary

| Quarter | 1 | 2 | 3 | 4 | Total |
|---|---|---|---|---|---|
| Cardinals | 7 | 0 | 7 | 0 | 14 |
| Commodores | 3 | 11 | 0 | 10 | 24 |

at FirstBank Stadium, Nashville, Tennessee

- Date: October 19
- Game time: 6:00 p.m. CDT
- Game weather: Clear, 64 °F (18 °C)
- Game attendance: 27,884
- Referee: Jeff Heaser
- TV announcers (SECN+/ESPN+): Richard Cross and Charles Arbuckle
- Box score, Recap

Game information
First quarter
- BALL – Kiael Kelly 9-yard run (Jason Courville kick), 8:06. Cardinals 7–0. Drive: 11 plays, 75 yards, 6:54.
- VAN – Brock Taylor 27-yard field goal, 1:42. Cardinals 7–3. Drive: 11 plays, 66 yards, 6:24.

Second quarter

- VAN – Brock Taylor 24-yard field goal, 11:37. Cardinals 7–6. Drive: 7 plays, 81 yards, 3:32.
- VAN – Eli Stowers 41-yard pass from Diego Pavia (Diego Pavia pass to Cole Spence), 2:39. Commodores 14–7. Drive: 11 plays, 97 yards, 3:45.

Third quarter

- BALL – Tanner Koziol 7-yard pass from Kadin Semonza (Jackson Courville kick), 6:03. Tied 14–14. Drive: 11 plays, 94 yards, 6:34.

Fourth quarter

- VAN – Brock Taylor 38-yard field goal, 14:44. Commodores 17–14. Drive: 14 plays, 54 yards, 6:14.
- VAN – Diego Pavia 5-yard run (Brock Taylor kick), 7:48. Commodores 24–14. Drive: 8 plays, 45 yards, 4:03.

| Statistics | BALL | VAN |
|---|---|---|
| First downs | 16 | 21 |
| Total yards | 268 | 420 |
| Rushing yards | 78 | 145 |
| Passing yards | 190 | 275 |
| Turnovers | 0 | 0 |
| Time of possession | 25:25 | 34:35 |

| Team | Category | Player | Statistics |
|---|---|---|---|
| Ball State | Passing | Kadin Semonza | 21/29, 190 yards, TD |
| Ball State | Rushing | Vaughn Pemberton | 5 rushes, 32 yards |
| Ball State | Receiving | Tanner Koziol | 9 receptions, 68 yards, TD |
| Vanderbilt | Passing | Diego Pavia | 17/31, 275 yards, TD |
| Vanderbilt | Rushing | Diego Pavia | 13 rushes, 82 yards, TD |
| Vanderbilt | Receiving | Eli Stowers | 8 receptions, 130 yards, TD |

=== No. 5 Texas ===
No. 5 Texas Longhorns at No. 25 Vanderbilt Commodores – Game summary

| Quarter | 1 | 2 | 3 | 4 | Total |
|---|---|---|---|---|---|
| No. 5 Longhorns | 14 | 7 | 3 | 3 | 27 |
| No. 25 Commodores | 7 | 3 | 7 | 7 | 24 |

at FirstBank Stadium, Nashville, Tennessee

- Date: October 26
- Game time: 3:15 p.m. CDT
- Game weather: Sunny
- Game attendance: 28,934
- Referee: Daniel Gautreaux
- TV announcers (SECN): Tom Hart, Cole Cubelic, and Alyssa Lang
- Box score, Recap

Game information
First quarter
- VAN – Diego Pavia 18-yard run (Brock Taylor kick), 9:40. Commodores 7–0. Drive: 5 plays, 31 yards, 2:54.
- TEX – Matthew Golden 3-yard pass from Quinn Ewers (Bert Auburn kick), 5:37. Tied 7–7. Drive: 9 plays, 75 yards, 4:03.
- TEX – DeAndre Moore Jr. 27-yard pass from Quinn Ewers (Bert Auburn kick), 1:13. Longhorns 14–7. Drive: 4 plays, 49 yards, 1:38.

Second quarter

- TEX – DeAndre Moore Jr. 25-yard pass from Quinn Ewers (Bert Auburn kick), 5:04. Longhorns 21–7. Drive: 5 plays, 59 yards, 1:47.
- VAN – Brock Taylor 54-yard field goal, 0:00. Longhorns 21–10. Drive: 5 plays, 29 yards, 0:34.

Third quarter

- TEX – Bert Auburn 40-yard field goal, 8:54. Longhorns 24–10. Drive: 11 plays, 50 yards, 4:26.
- VAN – Junior Sherrill 3-yard pass from Diego Pavia (Brock Taylor kick), 3:11. Longhorns 24–17. Drive: 8 plays, 38 yards, 3:16.

Fourth quarter

- TEX – Bert Auburn 23-yard field goal, 1:57. Longhorns 27–17. Drive: 7 plays, 24 yards, 3:08.
- VAN – Eli Stowers 8-yard pass from Diego Pavia (Brock Taylor kick), 0:46. Longhorns 27–24. Drive: 8 plays, 75 yards, 1:11.

| Statistics | TEX | VAN |
|---|---|---|
| First downs | 20 | 17 |
| Total yards | 392 | 269 |
| Rushing yards | 104 | 114 |
| Passing yards | 288 | 155 |
| Turnovers | 2 | 3 |
| Time of possession | 31:09 | 28:51 |

| Team | Category | Player | Statistics |
|---|---|---|---|
| Texas | Passing | Quinn Ewers | 27/37, 288 yards, 3 TD, 2 INT |
| Texas | Rushing | Quintrevion Wisner | 17 rushes, 79 yards |
| Texas | Receiving | DeAndre Moore Jr. | 6 receptions, 97 yards, 2 TD |
| Vanderbilt | Passing | Diego Pavia | 16/29, 143 yards, 2 TD, 2 INT |
| Vanderbilt | Rushing | Diego Pavia | 16 rushes, 67 yards, TD |
| Vanderbilt | Receiving | Junior Sherrill | 5 receptions, 62 yards, TD |

=== At Auburn ===
Vanderbilt Commodores at Auburn Tigers – Game summary

| Quarter | 1 | 2 | 3 | 4 | Total |
|---|---|---|---|---|---|
| Commodores | 7 | 0 | 3 | 7 | 17 |
| Tigers | 0 | 7 | 0 | 0 | 7 |

at Jordan–Hare Stadium, Auburn, Alabama

- Date: November 2
- Game time: 11:45 a.m. CDT
- Game weather: Sunny • Temperature: 75 °F (24 °C) • Wind: E 5 miles per hour (8.0 km/h)
- Game attendance: 88,043
- Referee: Kyle Olson
- TV announcers (SECN): Taylor Zarzour (play-by-play), Matt Stinchcomb (analyst) and Ashley Stroehlein (sideline reporter)
- Box score, Recap

Game information
First quarter
- VAN – A. J. Newberry 28-yard pass from Diego Pavia (Brock Taylor kick), 0:50. Commodores 7–0. Drive: 6 plays, 81 yards, 3:01.

Second quarter

- AUB – Rivaldo Fairweather 30-yard pass from Payton Thorne (Towns McGough kick), 6:45. Tied 7–7. Drive: 11 plays, 80 yards, 5:30.

Third quarter

- VAN – Brock Taylor 31-yard field goal, 1:05. Commodores 10–7. Drive: 4 plays, 8 yards, 1:20.

Fourth quarter

- VAN – Eli Stowers 4-yard pass from Diego Pavia (Brock Taylor kick), 4:18. Commodores 17–7. Drive: 14 plays, 78 yards, 8:53.

| Statistics | VAN | AUB |
|---|---|---|
| First downs | 12 | 14 |
| Total yards | 227 | 327 |
| Rushing yards | 84 | 88 |
| Passing yards | 143 | 239 |
| Turnovers | 0 | 1 |
| Time of possession | 31:57 | 28:03 |

| Team | Category | Player | Statistics |
|---|---|---|---|
| Vanderbilt | Passing | Diego Pavia | 9/22, 143 yards, 2 TD |
| Vanderbilt | Rushing | Sedrick Alexander | 10 rushes, 28 yards |
| Vanderbilt | Receiving | Junior Sherrill | 1 reception, 31 yards |
| Auburn | Passing | Payton Thorne | 20/29, 239 yards, TD |
| Auburn | Rushing | Jarquez Hunter | 12 rushes, 50 yards |
| Auburn | Receiving | KeAndre Lambert-Smith | 4 receptions, 78 yards |

=== South Carolina ===
South Carolina Gamecocks at No. 25 Vanderbilt Commodores – Game summary

| Quarter | 1 | 2 | 3 | 4 | Total |
|---|---|---|---|---|---|
| Gamecocks | 0 | 7 | 14 | 7 | 28 |
| No. 25 Commodores | 0 | 0 | 7 | 0 | 7 |

at FirstBank Stadium, Nashville, Tennessee

- Date: November 9
- Game time: 3:15 p.m. CST
- Game weather: Rain, 68 °F (20 °C)
- Game attendance: 28,934
- Referee: David Smith
- TV announcers (SECN): Dave Neal, Aaron Murray, and Ashley ShahAhmadi
- Box score, Recap

Game information
First quarter
- No scoring plays

Second quarter

- SCAR – Joshua Simon 17-yard pass from LaNorris Sellers (Alex Herrera kick), 13:11. Gamecocks 7–0. Drive: 12 plays, 81 yards, 4:45.

Third quarter

- SCAR – Raheim Sanders 33-yard run (Alex Herrera kick), 13:22. Gamecocks 14–0. Drive: 3 plays, 75 yards, 1:38.
- VAN – Diego Pavia 17-yard run (Brock Taylor kick), 8:08. Gamecocks 14–7. Drive: 10 plays, 75 yards, 5:13.
- SCAR – Raheim Sanders 1-yard run (Alex Herrera kick), 4:07. Gamecocks 21–7. Drive: 8 plays, 75 yards, 4:01.

Fourth quarter

- SCAR – Raheim Sanders 43-yard pass from LaNorris Sellers (Alex Herrera kick), 7:55. Gamecocks 28–7. Drive: 2 plays, 61 yards, 1:20.

| Statistics | SCAR | VAN |
|---|---|---|
| First downs | 25 | 17 |
| Total yards | 452 | 274 |
| Rushing yards | 214 | 108 |
| Passing yards | 238 | 166 |
| Turnovers | 1 | 1 |
| Time of possession | 30:59 | 29:01 |

| Team | Category | Player | Statistics |
|---|---|---|---|
| South Carolina | Passing | LaNorris Sellers | 14/20, 238 yards, 2 TD |
| South Carolina | Rushing | Raheim Sanders | 15 rushes, 126 yards, 2 TD |
| South Carolina | Receiving | Raheim Sanders | 2 Receptions, 52 yards, TD |
| Vanderbilt | Passing | Diego Pavia | 16/31, 166 yards |
| Vanderbilt | Rushing | Diego Pavia | 13 rushes, 65 yards, TD |
| Vanderbilt | Receiving | Eli Stowers | 4 receptions, 41 yards |

=== At LSU ===
Vanderbilt Commodores at LSU Tigers – Game summary

| Quarter | 1 | 2 | 3 | 4 | Total |
|---|---|---|---|---|---|
| Commodores | 7 | 0 | 3 | 7 | 17 |
| Tigers | 7 | 7 | 7 | 3 | 24 |

at Tiger Stadium, Baton Rouge, Louisiana

- Date: November 23
- Game time: 6:45 p.m. CST
- Game weather: Clear, 57 °F (14 °C)
- Game attendance: 102,086
- Referee: Steve Marlowe
- TV announcers (SECN): Tom Hart, Jordan Rodgers, and Cole Cubelic
- Box score, Recap

Game information
First quarter
- VAN – Quincy Skinner Jr. 63-yard pass from Diego Pavia (Brock Taylor kick), 12:49. Commodores 7–0. Drive: 1 play, 63 yards, 0:10.
- LSU – Josh Williams 20-yard run (Damian Ramos kick), 8:17. Tied 7–7. Drive: 8 plays, 90 yards, 4:30.

Second quarter

- LSU – Josh Williams 21-yard run (Damian Ramos kick), 0:51. Tigers 14–7. Drive: 9 plays, 80 yards, 3:31.

Third quarter

- VAN – Brock Taylor 47-yard field goal, 8:26. Tigers 14–10. Drive: 12 plays, 46 yards, 6:34.
- LSU – Kyren Lacy 12-yard pass from Garrett Nussmeier (Damian Ramos kick), 3:32. Tigers 21–10. Drive: 10 plays, 77 yards, 4:46.

Fourth quarter

- LSU – Damian Ramos 28-yard field goal, 10:41. Tigers 24–10. Drive: 13 plays, 74 yards, 6:08.
- VAN – Diego Pavia 1-yard run (Brock Taylor kick), 5:47. Tigers 24–17. Drive: 10 plays, 75 yards, 4:54.

| Statistics | VAN | LSU |
|---|---|---|
| First downs | 13 | 27 |
| Total yards | 308 | 471 |
| Rushing yards | 122 | 139 |
| Passing yards | 186 | 332 |
| Turnovers | 0 | 0 |
| Time of possession | 25:17 | 34:43 |

| Team | Category | Player | Statistics |
|---|---|---|---|
| Vanderbilt | Passing | Diego Pavia | 13/24, 186 yards, TD |
| Vanderbilt | Rushing | Diego Pavia | 6 rushes, 43 yards, TD |
| Vanderbilt | Receiving | Quincy Skinner Jr. | 3 receptions, 72 yards, TD |
| LSU | Passing | Garrett Nussmeier | 28/37, 332 yards, TD |
| LSU | Rushing | Josh Williams | 14 rushes, 90 yards, 2 TD |
| LSU | Receiving | Kyren Lacy | 6 receptions, 85 yards, TD |

=== No. 8 Tennessee ===
Tennessee Volunteers at Vanderbilt Commodores – Game summary

| Quarter | 1 | 2 | 3 | 4 | Total |
|---|---|---|---|---|---|
| No. 8 Volunteers | 7 | 17 | 9 | 3 | 36 |
| Commodores | 17 | 0 | 0 | 6 | 23 |

at FirstBank Stadium, Nashville, Tennessee

- Date: November 30
- Game time: 11:00 a.m. CST
- Game weather: Sunny • Temperature: 41 °F (5 °C) • Wind: SW 4 miles per hour (6.4 km/h)
- Game attendance: 28,934
- Referee: Jason Autrey
- TV announcers (ABC): Dave Pasch, Dusty Dvoracek, and Taylor McGregor
- Box score, Recap

Game information
First quarter
- VAN – Junior Sherrill 100-yard kickoff return (Brock Taylor kick), 14:47. Commodores 7–0. Drive: 0 plays, 0 yards, 0:13.
- VAN – Sedrick Alexander 4-yard run (Brock Taylor kick), 10:22. Commodores 14–0. Drive: 7 plays, 26 yards, 3:52.
- TENN – Dont'e Thornton Jr. 28-yard pass from Nico Iamaleava (Max Gilbert kick), 8:48. Commodores 14–7. Drive: 5 plays, 73 yards, 1:34.
- VAN – Brock Taylor 32-yard field goal, 4:01. Commodores 17–7. Drive: 9 plays, 61 yards, 4:47.

Second quarter

- TENN – Max Gilbert 50-yard field goal, 8:33. Commodores 17–10. Drive: 6 plays, 21 yards, 2:59.
- TENN – Dont'e Thornton Jr. 86-yard pass from Nico Iamaleava (Max Gilbert kick), 6:38. Tied 17–17. Drive: 2 plays, 91 yards, 0:31.
- TENN – Miles Kitselman 18-yard pass from Nico Iamaleava (Max Gilbert kick), 0:22. Volunteers 24–17. Drive:10 plays, 96 yards, 2:19.

Third quarter

- TENN – Mike Matthews 14-yard pass from Nico Iamaleava (Max Gilbert kick), 8:43. Volunteers 31–17 Drive: 13 plays, 75 yards, 6:17.
- TENN – Tyre West Safety, 1:09. Volunteers 33–17. Drive: 2 plays, −4 yards, 0:49.

Fourth quarter

- TENN – Max Gilbert 22-yard field goal, 8:24. Volunteers 36–17. Drive: 13 plays, 46 yards, 7:46.
- VAN – Richie Hoskins 31-yard pass from Diego Pavia (No good on Two-Point conversion), 5:53. Volunteers 36–23. Drive: 4 plays, 63 yards, 2:23.

| Statistics | TENN | VAN |
|---|---|---|
| First downs | 28 | 15 |
| Total yards | 538 | 212 |
| Rushing yards | 281 | 108 |
| Passing yards | 257 | 104 |
| Turnovers | 2 | 1 |
| Time of possession | 33:35 | 26:25 |

| Team | Category | Player | Statistics |
|---|---|---|---|
| Tennessee | Passing | Nico Iamaleava | 18/26, 257 yards, 4 TDs, 1 INT |
| Tennessee | Rushing | Dylan Sampson | 25 rushes, 178 yards |
| Tennessee | Receiving | Dont'e Thornton Jr. | 3 receptions, 118 yards, 2 TD |
| Vanderbilt | Passing | Diego Pavia | 8/17, 104 yards, 1 TD, 1 INT |
| Vanderbilt | Rushing | Sedrick Alexander | 17 rushes, 60 yards, 1 TD |
| Vanderbilt | Receiving | Richie Hoskins | 1 reception, 31 yards, 1 TD |

=== Georgia Tech (Birmingham Bowl / rivalry) ===
2024 Birmingham Bowl
Georgia Tech Yellow Jackets (7–5) vs Vanderbilt Commodores (6–6) – Game summary

| Quarter | 1 | 2 | 3 | 4 | Total |
|---|---|---|---|---|---|
| Yellow Jackets | 0 | 10 | 3 | 14 | 27 |
| Commodores | 7 | 7 | 7 | 14 | 35 |

at Protective Stadium • Birmingham, Alabama

- Date: Friday, December 27, 2024
- Game time: 2:30 p.m. CST
- Game weather: Cloudy • Temperature: 59 °F (15 °C)
- Game attendance: 33,840
- Referee: Mark Kluczynski
- TV announcers (ESPN): Dave Neal (play-by-play), Aaron Murray (analyst), and Ashley ShahAhmadi (sideline)

Game information

First Quarter

- (2:26) VAN – Cole Spence 7 yard pass from Diego Pavia, Brock Taylor kick (Drive: 8 plays, 87 yards, 4:40; Vanderbilt 7–0)

Second Quarter

- (10:06) GT – Ryland Goede 2 yard pass from Haynes King, Aidan Birr kick (Drive: 15 plays, 75 yards, 7:20; Tied 7–7)
- (1:55) VAN – Diego Pavia 2 yard run, Brock Taylor kick (Drive: 14 plays, 81 yards, 8:11; Vanderbilt 14–7)
- (0:08) GT – Aidan Birr 43 yard field goal (Drive: 9 plays, 49 yards, 1:47; Vanderbilt 14–10)

Third Quarter

- (8:34) GT – Aidan Birr 33 yard field goal (Drive: 8 plays, 46 yards, 3:51; Vanderbilt 14–13)
- (0:56) VAN – Eli Stowers 3 yard pass from Diego Pavia, Brock Taylor kick (Drive: 5 plays, 56 yards, 2:20; Vanderbilt 21–13)

Fourth Quarter

- (14:55) VAN – Quincy Skinner 7 yard pass from Diego Pavia, Brock Taylor kick (Drive: 3 plays, 11 yards, 0:49; Vanderbilt 28–13)
- (9:59) VAN – Diego Pavia 6 yard run, Brock Taylor kick (Drive: 6 plays, 73 yards, 3:41; Vanderbilt 35–13)
- (5:03) GT – Jamal Haynes 9 yard pass from Haynes King, Aidan Birr kick (Drive: 11 plays, 75 yards, 4:56; Vanderbilt 35–20)
- (1:30) GT – Bailey Stockton 2 yard pass from Haynes King, Aidan Birr kick (Drive: 11 plays, 83 yards, 2:36; Vanderbilt 35–27)

| Statistics | GT | VAN |
|---|---|---|
| First downs | 24 | 20 |
| Plays–yards | 69–394 | 59–306 |
| Rushes–yards | 36–190 | 38–146 |
| Passing yards | 204 | 160 |
| Passing: comp–att–int | 25–33–1 | 13–21–0 |
| Turnovers | | |
| Time of possession | 28:50 | 31:10 |

| Team | Category | Player | Statistics |
|---|---|---|---|
| Georgia Tech | Passing | Haynes King | 25/33, 204 yards, 3 TD, INT |
| Georgia Tech | Rushing | Jamal Haynes | 17 carries, 136 yards |
| Georgia Tech | Receiving | Abdul Janneh | 3 receptions, 34 yards |
| Vanderbilt | Passing | Diego Pavia | 13/21, 160 yards, 3 TD |
| Vanderbilt | Rushing | Diego Pavia | 17 carries, 84 yards, 2 TD |
| Vanderbilt | Receiving | Eli Stowers | 4 receptions, 55 yards, TD |
