= Blaze Berlowitz =

American football player (born 2005)

No. 1 – Vanderbilt Commodores
- Position: Quarterback
- Class: Redshirt Junior

Personal information
- Born: April 12, 2005 (age 21)
- Listed height: 6 ft 3 in (1.91 m)
- Listed weight: 200 lb (91 kg)

Career information
- High school: Cushing (Cushing, Oklahoma)
- College: New Mexico State (2023); Vanderbilt (2024–present)
- Stats at ESPN

Blaze Berlowitz (born April 12, 2005) is an American college football quarterback for the Vanderbilt Commodores. He previously played for the New Mexico State Aggies.

== Early life ==
Berlowitz attended Cushing High School in Cushing, Oklahoma, and committed to play college football for the New Mexico State Aggies.

== College career ==
=== New Mexico State ===
As a freshman in 2023, Berlowitz competed with Eli Stowers and Gavin Frakes for the role of Diego Pavia's backup. As Stowers transitioned to tight end, Berlowitz moved up the depth chart and became Pavia's primary backup. In the Conference USA Championship against Liberty, Pavia was injured and Berlowitz made his collegiate debut. He completed 10 of 19 passes for 134 yards, one touchdown and one interception in the 49–35 loss. Berlowitz used his redshirt, having appeared in only one game during the season. On December 1, 2023, he entered the NCAA transfer portal.

=== Vanderbilt ===
On December 20, 2023, he announced his decision to transfer to Vanderbilt University. In 2024, Berlowitz entered the season as the fourth-string quarterback behind Pavia, Nate Johnson, and Drew Dickey and did not appear in any games.

In 2025, following Johnson's transfer to Utah, Berlowitz moved ahead of Dickey on the depth chart and served as Pavia's primary backup. He made his Vanderbilt debut in the season-opening victory over Charleston Southern. The following week, he threw his first touchdown pass as a Commodore, a nine-yard pass to Stowers, in a victory over Virginia Tech. On the season, he appeared in six games, completing nine of 17 passes for 131 yards and one touchdown while rushing for 81 yards and a touchdown.

Entering the 2026 season, Berlowitz was named the team's starting quarterback over freshman and five-star recruit Jared Curtis. In the season opener against Austin Peay, Berlowitz completed 11 of 16 passes for 149 yards and a touchdown while rushing for 44 yards and a touchdown in the 28–9 victory.

=== Statistics ===
Year	Team	Games			Passing								Rushing				Receiving			
Year	Team	GP	GS	Record	Cmp	Att	Pct	Yds	Y/A	TD	Int	Rtg	Att	Yds	Avg	TD	Rec	Yds	Avg	TD
2023	New Mexico State	1	0	—	10	19	52.6	134	7.1	1	1	118.7	4	36	9.0	0	0	0.0	0.0	0
2024	Vanderbilt	0	0	—	DNP															
2025	Vanderbilt	6	0	—	9	17	52.9	131	7.7	1	0	137.1	11	81	7.4	1	0	0.0	0.0	0
2026	Vanderbilt	5	3	2–1	28	53	52.8	386	7.3	1	1	116.5	13	50	3.8	1	1	0.0	0.0	0
Career		12	3	2–1	47	89	52.8	651	7.3	3	2	120.9	28	167	6.0	2	1	0.0	0.0	0
