= Junior Sherrill =

American football player (born 2005)

No. 0 – Vanderbilt Commodores
- Position: Wide receiver
- Class: Senior

Personal information
- Born: June 24, 2005 (age 21)
- Listed height: 5 ft 11 in (1.80 m)
- Listed weight: 200 lb (91 kg)

Career information
- High school: Lipscomb Academy (Nashville, Tennessee)
- College: Vanderbilt (2023–present)
- Stats at ESPN

Junior Sherrill (born June 14, 2005) is an American college football wide receiver for the Vanderbilt Commodores.

== Early life ==
Sherrill attended Lipscomb Academy in Nashville, Tennessee. As a senior, he was the Tennessee Mr. Football after recording 94 receptions for 1,362 yards and 24 touchdowns. In the 2022 state championship game, he had 221 all-purpose yards with four touchdowns and was named the games MVP. Sherrill committed to Vanderbilt University to play college football.

== College career ==
As a freshman at Vanderbilt in 2023, he played in all 12 games and had 20 receptions for 293 yards and three touchdowns. As a sophomore in 2024, he started 12 of 13 games and recorded 29 receptions for 411 yards with three receiving touchdowns and a kick-return touchdown. As a junior in 2025, he started 11 of 13 games and was second on the team with 54 receptions for 784 yards and seven touchdowns. Sherrill returned to Vanderbilt for the 2026 season.

=== Statistics ===
Year	Team	GP	Receiving				Rushing				Kick Returns			
Year	Team	GP	Rec	Yds	Avg	TD	Att	Yds	Avg	TD	Ret	Yds	Avg	TD
2023	Vanderbilt	12	20	293	14.7	3	4	29	7.3	0	0	0	0	0
2024	Vanderbilt	13	29	411	14.2	3	7	16	2.3	0	16	427	26.7	1
2025	Vanderbilt	13	54	784	14.5	7	4	16	4.0	1	0	0	0	0
2026	Vanderbilt	3	15	272	18.1	2	1	3	3.0	0	3	65	21.7	0
Career		41	118	1,760	14.9	15	16	64	4.0	1	19	492	25.9	1
