= Clark Lea =

American football player and coach (born 1981)

Current position
- Title: Head coach
- Team: Vanderbilt
- Conference: SEC
- Record: 30–43

Biographical details
- Born: November 11, 1981 (age 45); Nashville, Tennessee, U.S.
- Education: Vanderbilt University (2004, 2007)

Playing career

Baseball
- 2001: Birmingham–Southern
- 2002: Belmont

Football
- 2002–2004: Vanderbilt
- Position: Fullback

Coaching career (HC unless noted)
- 2005: Harvard-Westlake School (assistant)
- 2006: UCLA (GA)
- 2007: South Dakota State (LB)
- 2008: South Dakota State (RC/LB)
- 2009: UCLA (GA)
- 2010–2011: UCLA (LB)
- 2012: Bowling Green (LB)
- 2013–2015: Syracuse (LB)
- 2016: Wake Forest (LB)
- 2017: Notre Dame (LB)
- 2018–2020: Notre Dame (DC)
- 2021–present: Vanderbilt

Head coaching record
- Overall: 30–43
- Bowls: 1–1

Accomplishments and honors

Awards
- 2× SEC Coach of the Year (2024, 2025); Eddie Robinson Coach of the Year (2025)

Clark Lea (born November 11, 1981) is an American football coach who has been the head football coach at Vanderbilt University since 2021. He previously served as the defensive coordinator at the University of Notre Dame from 2018 to 2020. Lea began his coaching career as a graduate assistant at University of California, Los Angeles (UCLA) in 2006 and went on to serve as an assistant coach at South Dakota State University, Bowling Green State University, Syracuse University, and Wake Forest University.

In 2026, Lea was voted as president of the American Football Coaches Association (AFCA).

== Playing career ==
Lea started his college career playing baseball. He helped lead Birmingham Southern to the 2001 NAIA championship his freshman year. Lea then transferred to Belmont University and played one year of baseball (5G, 2-for-5, K). Lea remained in Nashville and finished his college career at Vanderbilt, where he played fullback for the Commodores his final two years.

== Coaching career ==
=== UCLA ===
In 2006, Lea began his coaching career at UCLA as a graduate assistant under head coach Karl Dorrell.

=== South Dakota State ===
In 2007, Lea joined South Dakota State University as their linebackers coach under head coach John Stiegelmeier. In 2008, Lea was given an additional role as recruiting coordinator.

=== UCLA (second stint) ===
In 2009, Lea returned to UCLA as a graduate assistant under head coach Rick Neuheisel. In 2010, he was promoted to linebackers coach. Following Neuheisel's firing on November 28, 2011, Lea was not retained by UCLA for the 2012 season.

=== Bowling Green ===
In 2012, Lea was hired as the linebackers coach at Bowling Green State University under defensive coordinator Mike Elko and head coach Dave Clawson.

=== Syracuse ===
In 2013, Lea joined Syracuse University as their linebackers coach under head coach Scott Shafer.

=== Wake Forest ===
In 2016, Lea was hired as the linebackers coach at Wake Forest University, reuniting with defensive coordinator Mike Elko and head coach Dave Clawson.

=== Notre Dame ===
In 2017, Lea followed defensive coordinator Mike Elko to the University of Notre Dame to serve as their linebackers coach under head coach Brian Kelly. In January 2018, Lea was promoted to defensive coordinator, replacing Mike Elko, who departed to serve in the same role at Texas A&M.

=== Vanderbilt ===
On December 14, 2020, Lea was named the 29th head football coach at Vanderbilt University, replacing Derek Mason.

In the 2021 season, Lea led Vanderbilt to a 2–10 mark in his first season as head coach. The 2022 season marked improvement for Lea and the Commodores with a 5–7 record. The Commodores defeated SEC East rivals Kentucky and Florida to highlight the 2022 season. In the 2023 offseason, Lea's contract was extended three years through the 2029 season. Lea coached Vanderbilt to a 2–10 record in the 2023 season. On October 5, 2024, Lea coached Vanderbilt to a 40–35 upset victory over No. 1 Alabama, the Commodores' first ever win vs an AP top 5 team, as well as their first win over Alabama since 1984. Lea led Vanderbilt to a 6–6 mark in the regular season. The team played in the Birmingham Bowl against Georgia Tech and won 35–27. Lea and Vanderbilt played the University of Iowa in the 2025 ReliaQuest Bowl, losing to the Hawkeyes 34 to 27.

Lea helped lead the Commodores to a 5–0 start, which included a 31–7 win over #11 South Carolina. The 5–0 start was Vanderbilt's first since the 2008 season. After a road 30–14 loss to #10 Alabama, Vanderbilt defeated #10 LSU 31–24 and #15 Missouri 17–10. With the win over Missouri, Vanderbilt had its best start since the 1941 season. Vanderbilt moved up to a #9 ranking in the AP Poll, its highest since 1937. Vanderbilt dropped its next game to #20 Texas 34–31 on the road. Vanderbilt closed out the year with three consecutive wins: 45–38 over Auburn, 45–17 over Kentucky, and 45–24 over #18 Tennessee. On November 28, 2025, Lea agreed to a six-year contract extension with Vanderbilt, which included a significant salary increase. Vanderbilt finished with a 10–2 regular season in 2025. Vanderbilt finished with ten wins for the first time in school history. Vanderbilt lost the ReliaQuest Bowl to Iowa 34–27. Vanderbilt's three losses were the fewest for the program since the 1974 season. The 2025 season saw Vanderbilt ranked for the first time in the College Football Playoff rankings. Vanderbilt finished with a #15 in the final AP Poll, their highest finish since 1948.

== Head coaching record ==
Year	Team	Overall	Conference	Standing	Bowl/playoffs	Coaches^{#}	AP^{°}
Vanderbilt Commodores (Southeastern Conference) (2021–present)
2021	Vanderbilt	2–10	0–8	7th (Eastern)			
2022	Vanderbilt	5–7	2–6	7th (Eastern)			
2023	Vanderbilt	2–10	0–8	7th (Eastern)			
2024	Vanderbilt	7–6	3–5	T–11th	W Birmingham		
2025	Vanderbilt	10–3	6–2	T–5th	L ReliaQuest	15	15
2026	Vanderbilt	4–7	1–7	T–14th			
Vanderbilt:		30–43	12–36				
Total:		30–43					
