= 2023 Vanderbilt Commodores football team =

American college football season

2023 Vanderbilt Commodores football
- Conference: Southeastern Conference
- Eastern Division
- Record: 2–10 (0–8 SEC)
- Head coach: Clark Lea (3rd season)
- Offensive coordinator: Joey Lynch (2nd season)
- Offensive scheme: Pro spread
- Defensive coordinator: Nick Howell (2nd season)
- Base defense: 4–2–5
- Home stadium: FirstBank Stadium

2023 Southeastern Conference football standings
	Conf.			Overall
Team	W		L	W		L
Eastern Division
No. 4 Georgia xy	8	–	0	13	–	1
No. 8 Missouri	6	–	2	11	–	2
No. 17 Tennessee	4	–	4	9	–	4
Kentucky	3	–	5	7	–	6
Florida	3	–	5	5	–	7
South Carolina	3	–	5	5	–	7
Vanderbilt	0	–	8	2	–	10
Western Division
No. 5 Alabama xy$^	8	–	0	12	–	2
No. 9 Ole Miss	6	–	2	11	–	2
No. 12 LSU	6	–	2	10	–	3
Texas A&M	4	–	4	7	–	6
Auburn	3	–	5	6	–	7
Mississippi State	1	–	7	5	–	7
Arkansas	1	–	7	4	–	8
Championship: Alabama 27, Georgia 24
^ – College Football Playoff participant; $ – Conference champion; x – Division champion/co-champions; y – Championship game participant; Rankings from AP Poll

The 2023 Vanderbilt Commodores football team represented Vanderbilt University in the Eastern Division of the Southeastern Conference (SEC) during the 2023 NCAA Division I FBS football season. The Commodores were led by Clark Lea in his third year as their head coach. Following their blowout loss to Ole Miss, the Commodores became ineligible for a bowl selection for the 5th consecutive season. This was the last year of the Eastern and Western divisions of the SEC, as Texas and Oklahoma joined the SEC in 2024.

== Schedule ==
Vanderbilt and the SEC announced the 2023 football schedule on September 20, 2022. The 2023 Commodores' schedule consists of 6 home games and 6 away games for the regular season. Vanderbilt will host four SEC conference opponents Auburn, Georgia (rivalry), Kentucky (rivalry) and Missouri at home and will travel to four SEC opponents, Florida, Mississippi (rivalry), South Carolina and Tennessee (rivalry) to close out the SEC regular season on the road. Vanderbilt is not scheduled to play SEC West opponents Alabama, Arkansas, LSU, Mississippi State and Texas A&M in the 2023 regular season. The Commodores' have two bye weeks this season.

Vanderbilt's out of conference opponents represent the ACC, Mountain West and SWAC. The Commodores will host two of the four non–conference games which are against Alabama A&M from the SWAC and Hawaii from the Mountain West. The Commodores will travel to two non–conference games which are against UNLV also from the Mountain West and will travel to Wake Forest from the ACC.

Date	Time	Opponent	Site	TV	Result	Attendance
August 26	6:30 p.m.	Hawaii*	FirstBank Stadium; Nashville, TN	SECN	W 35–28	21,407
September 2	6:00 p.m.	Alabama A&M*	FirstBank Stadium; Nashville, TN	SECN+/ESPN+	W 47–13	22,035
September 9	10:00 a.m.	at Wake Forest*	Allegacy Federal Credit Union Stadium; Winston-Salem, NC	ACCN	L 20–36	28,363
September 16	6:00 p.m.	at UNLV*	Allegiant Stadium; Paradise, NV	CBSSN	L 37–40	22,582
September 23	11:00 a.m.	Kentucky	FirstBank Stadium; Nashville, TN (rivalry)	SECN	L 28–45	26,279
September 30	3:00 p.m.	No. 23 Missouri	FirstBank Stadium; Nashville, TN	SECN	L 21–38	26,332
October 7	3:00 p.m.	at Florida	Ben Hill Griffin Stadium; Gainesville, FL	SECN	L 14–38	89,432
October 14	11:00 a.m.	No. 1 Georgia	FirstBank Stadium; Nashville, TN (rivalry)	CBS	L 20–37	28,500
October 28	6:30 p.m.	at No. 12 Ole Miss	Vaught–Hemingway Stadium; Oxford, MS (rivalry)	SECN	L 7–33	62,914
November 4	3:00 p.m.	Auburn	FirstBank Stadium; Nashville, TN	SECN	L 15–31	28,500
November 11	11:00 a.m.	at South Carolina	Williams–Brice Stadium; Columbia, SC	SECN	L 6–47	75,682
November 25	2:30 p.m.	at No. 21 Tennessee	Neyland Stadium; Knoxville, TN (rivalry)	SECN	L 24–48	101,915
*Non-conference game; Rankings from AP Poll (and CFP Rankings, after November 1) – Released prior to game; All times are in Central time

== Rankings ==
Ranking movements Legend: — = Not ranked
	Week																
Poll	Pre	1	2	3	4	5	6	7	8	9	10	11	12	13	14	15	Final
AP	—	—	—	—	—	—	—	—	—	—	—	—	—	—	—	—	—
Coaches	—	—	—	—	—	—	—	—	—	—	—	—	—	—	—	—	—
CFP	Not released										—	—	—	—	—	—	Not released

== Game summaries ==
=== Hawaii ===
Game One (Week Zero) – Hawaii Rainbow Warriors at Vanderbilt Commodores – Game summary

Quarter	1	2	3	4	Total
Hawaii	7	7	0	14	28
Vanderbilt	14	7	7	7	35

at FirstBank Stadium, Nashville, TN

- Date: Saturday, August 26, 2023
- Game time: 8:10 p.m. CST
- Game weather: 75 °F (24 °C)
- Game attendance: 21,407
- Referee: Cal McNeill
- TV announcers (SEC Network): Taylor Zarzour (Primary Commentator), Matt Stinchcomb (Color Commentator), Alyssa Lang (Sideline Reporter)

Game information

First quarter

- (11:26) VAN – Patrick Smith 21-yard run (run failed) (Drive: 4 plays, 32 yards, 1:22; Vanderbilt 6–0)
- (7:13) HAW – Steven McBride 9-yard pass from Brayden Schager (Matthew Shipley kick) (Drive: 8 plays, 75 yards, 4:13; Hawaii 7–6)
- (7:00) VAN – Jayden McGowan 97-yard kickoff return (AJ Swann pass to Quincy Skinner Jr.) (Vanderbilt 14–7)

Second quarter

- (14:56) VAN – Will Sheppard 7-yard pass from AJ Swann (Jacob Borcila kick) (Drive: 8 plays, 84 yards, 4:41; Vanderbilt 21–7)
- (13:03) HAW – Steven McBride 45-yard pass from Brayden Schager (Matthew Shipley kick) (Drive: 5 plays, 68 yards, 1:45; Vanderbilt 21–14)

Third quarter

- (9:32) VAN – Will Sheppard 1-yard pass from AJ Swann (Jacob Borcila kick) (Drive: 4 plays, 38 yards, 2:01; Vanderbilt 28–14)

Fourth quarter

- (14:48) VAN – London Humphreys 32-yard pass from AJ Swann (Jacob Borcila kick) (Drive: 10 plays, 87 yards, 2:56; Vanderbilt 35–14)
- (11:20) HAW – Pofele Ashlock 3-yard pass from Brayden Schager (Matthew Shipley kick) (Drive: 8 plays, 75 yards, 3:28; Vanderbilt 35–21)
- (4:49) HAW – Dalen Morris 1-yard run (Matthew Shipley kick) (Drive: 6 plays, 67 yards, 2:18; Vanderbilt 35–28)

Win Probability

Line

- VAN –17.0

Over/Under

- 54.5

Statistics	HAW	VAN
First downs	19	17
Total yards	391	297
Rushing yards	40	39
Passing yards	351	258
Turnovers	2	0
Time of possession	31:22	28:38

Team	Category	Player	Statistics
Hawaii	Passing	Brayden Schager	27/35, 351 yards, 3 TD, 2 INT
Hawaii	Rushing	Landon Sims	9 carries, 38 yards
Hawaii	Receiving	Pofele Ashlock	7 receptions, 127 yards, TD
Vanderbilt	Passing	AJ Swann	19/30, 258 yards, 3 TD
Vanderbilt	Rushing	Patrick Smith	7 carries, 30 yards, TD
Vanderbilt	Receiving	Jayden McGowan	6 receptions, 72 yards

=== Alabama A&M ===
Game Two – Alabama A&M Bulldogs (FCS) (0-0) at Vanderbilt Commodores (1-0) – Game summary

Quarter	1	2	3	4	Total
Alabama A&M (FCS)	3	0	7	3	13
Vanderbilt	5	7	14	21	47

at FirstBank Stadium, Nashville, TN

- Date: Saturday, September 2, 2023
- Game time: 6:00 p.m. CST
- Game weather: Sunny • Temperature: 89 °F (32 °C) • Wind: S 4 miles per hour (6.4 km/h)
- Game attendance: 22,035
- Referee: Jason Autrey
- TV: SECN+/ESPN+

Game information

First quarter

- (6:05) AAMU – Victor Barbosa 21-yard field goal (Drive: 20 plays, 71 yards, 8:55; Alabama A&M 3–0)
- (1:32) VAN – Jacob Borcila 23-yard field goal (Drive: 10 plays, 47 yards, 4:29; Tied 3–3)
- (0:33) VAN – TEAM 0-yard safety (Vanderbilt 5–3)

Second quarter

- (8:50) VAN – Will Sheppard 3-yard pass from AJ Swann (Jacob Borcila kick) (Drive: 8 plays, 50 yards, 2:38; Vanderbilt 12–3)

Third quarter

- (12:18) VAN – Will Sheppard 17-yard pass from AJ Swann (Jacob Borcila kick) (Drive: 6 plays, 75 yards, 2:42; Vanderbilt 19–3)
- (11:32) AAMU – Terrell Gardner 62-yard pass from Xavier Lankford (Victor Barbosa kick) (Drive: 2 plays, 73 yards, 0:40; Vanderbilt 19–10)
- (3:07) VAN – AJ Swann 1-yard run (Jacob Borcila kick) (Drive: 8 plays, 57 yards, 3:54; Vanderbilt 26–10)

Fourth quarter

- (14:54) VAN – Sedrick Alexander 17-yard run (Jacob Borcila kick) (Drive: 5 plays, 52 yards, 1:23; Vanderbilt 33–10)
- (11:32) VAN – Sedrick Alexander 9-yard run (Jacob Borcila kick) (Drive: 2 plays, 19 yards, 0:45; Vanderbilt 40–10)
- (7:43) VAN – Kamrean Johnson 17-yard pass from Ken Seals (Jacob Borcila kick) (Drive: 2 plays, 49 yards, 1:06; Vanderbilt 47–10)
- (2:32) AAMU – Victor Barbosa 29-yard field goal (Drive: 10 plays, 63 yards, 5:11; Vanderbilt 47–13)

Win Probability

Line

- VAN –34.5

Over/Under

- 53.5

Statistics	AAMU	VAN
First downs	14	24
Total yards	278	461
Rushing yards	135	215
Passing yards	143	246
Turnovers	1	1
Time of possession	32:22	27:38

Team	Category	Player	Statistics
Alabama A&M	Passing	Xavier Lankford	11/22, 105 yards, TD
Alabama A&M	Rushing	Isaiah Nwokenkwo	1 carry, 39 yards
Alabama A&M	Receiving	Terrell Gardner	3 receptions, 83 yards, TD
Vanderbilt	Passing	AJ Swann	15/29, 194 yards, 2 TD, INT
Vanderbilt	Rushing	Sedrick Alexander	12 carries, 87 yards, 2 TD
Vanderbilt	Receiving	Jayden McGowan	6 receptions, 70 yards

=== at Wake Forest ===
Game Three – Vanderbilt Commodores (2–0) at Wake Forest Demon Deacons (1–0) – Game summary

Quarter	1	2	3	4	Total
Vanderbilt	0	14	0	6	20
Wake Forest	3	21	3	9	36

at Truist Field, Winston-Salem, NC

- Date: September 9, 2023
- Game time: 10:00 a.m. CST
- Game attendance: 28,363
- Referee: Lee Hendrick
- TV announcers (ACCN): Courtney Lyle (play-by-play), Hutson Mason (analyst), Lericia Harris (sideline)

Game information

First quarter

- (12:50) WAKE – Matthew Dennis 25-yard field goal (Drive: 4 plays, 4 yards, 0:40; Wake Forest 3–0)

Second quarter

- (12:55) WAKE – Jahmal Banks 7-yard pass from Mitch Griffis (Matthew Dennis kick) (Drive: 9 plays, 80 yards, 3:10; Wake Forest 10–0)
- (10:03) VAN – Will Sheppard 11-yard pass from AJ Swann (Jacob Borcila kick) (Drive: 5 plays, 75 yards, 2:46; Wake Forest 10–7)
- (3:22) WAKE – Tate Carney 1-yard run (Matthew Dennis kick) (Drive: 14 plays, 75 yards, 6:41; Wake Forest 17–7)
- (1:42) VAN – Will Sheppard 10-yard pass from AJ Swann (Jacob Borcila kick) (Drive: 4 plays, 75 yards, 1:40; Wake Forest 17–14)
- (0:50) WAKE – Brendon Harris 31-yard fumble return (Matthew Dennis kick) (Wake Forest 24–14)

Third quarter

- (12:36) WAKE – Matthew Dennis 44-yard field goal (Drive: 8 plays, 55 yards, 2:18; Wake Forest 27–14)

Fourth quarter

- (11:39) WAKE – Ke'Shawn Williams 24-yard pass from Mitch Griffis (pass failed) (Drive: 7 plays, 50 yards, 3:15; Wake Forest 33–14)
- (9:08) VAN – London Humphreys 30-yard pass from AJ Swann (pass failed) (Drive: 7 plays, 75 yards, 2:31; Wake Forest 33–20)
- (2:24) WAKE – Matthew Dennis 20-yard field goal (Drive: 11 plays, 73 yards, 6:44; Wake Forest 36–20)

Statistics	VAN	WAKE
First downs	21	29
Total yards	423	484
Rushing yards	109	288
Passing yards	314	196
Turnovers	3	1
Time of possession	25:43	34:17

Team	Category	Player	Statistics
Vanderbilt	Passing	AJ Swann	26/39, 314 yards, 3 TD, 2 INT
Vanderbilt	Rushing	Patrick Smith	10 carries, 77 yards
Vanderbilt	Receiving	London Humphreys	4 receptions, 109 yards, TD
Wake Forest	Passing	Mitch Griffis	17/26, 196 yards, 2 TD
Wake Forest	Rushing	Demond Claiborne	26 carries, 165 yards
Wake Forest	Receiving	Ke'Shawn Williams	5 receptions, 92 yards, TD

=== at UNLV ===
Game Four – Vanderbilt Commodores (2–1) vs UNLV Rebels (1–1) – Game summary

Quarter	1	2	3	4	Total
Vanderbilt	10	7	0	20	37
UNLV	0	20	10	10	40

at Allegiant Stadium • Paradise, NV

- Date: September 16, 2023
- Game time: 6:00 p.m. CST
- Game weather: None (Indoor stadium)
- Game attendance: 22,582
- Referee: Matt Loeffler
- TV announcers (CBS Sports Network): Chris Lewis, Ross Tucker, Justin Walters

Game information

First quarter

- (8:52) VAN – Martel Hight 37-yard interception return (Jacob Borcila kick) (Vanderbilt 7–0)
- (1:14) VAN – Jacob Borcila 30-yard field goal (Drive: 11 plays, 48 yards, 6:01; Vanderbilt 10–0)

Second quarter

- (13:51) VAN – London Humphreys 56-yard pass from AJ Swann (Jacob Borcila kick) (Drive: 4 plays, 68 yards, 1:24; Vanderbilt 17–0)
- (12:17) UNLV – Jai'Den Thomas 21-yard run (Jose Pizano kick) (Drive: 4 plays, 61 yards, 1:27; Vanderbilt 17–7)
- (10:48) UNLV – Jose Pizano 27-yard field goal (Drive: 4 plays, 5 yards, 0:24; Vanderbilt 17–10)
- (9:38) UNLV – Jerrae Williams 41-yard fumble return (Jose Pizano kick) (Tied 17–17)
- (0:03) UNLV – Jose Pizano 31-yard field goal (Drive: 3 plays, 15 yards, 0:16; UNLV 20–17)

Third quarter

- (10:14) UNLV – Jose Pizano 34-yard field goal (Drive: 13 plays, 59 yards, 4:46; UNLV 23–17)
- (2:00) UNLV – Jayden Maiava 24-yard run (Jose Pizano kick) (Drive: 8 plays, 56 yards, 3:19; UNLV 30–17)

Fourth quarter

- (13:35) VAN – Justin Ball 3-yard pass from AJ Swann (Jacob Borcila kick) (Drive: 8 plays, 64 yards, 2:45; UNLV 30–24)
- (9:16) VAN – Jacob Borcila 32-yard field goal (Drive: 8 plays, 56 yards, 3:07; UNLV 30–27)
- (4:47) VAN – Jacob Borcila 44-yard field goal (Drive: 5 plays, 33 yards, 1:13; Tied 30–30)
- (2:23) UNLV – Jacob De Jesus 48-yard pass from Jayden Maiava (Jose Pizano kick) (Drive: 6 plays, 75 yards, 2:24; UNLV 37–30)
- (1:12) VAN – Quincy Skinner Jr. 34-yard pass from AJ Swann (Jacob Borcila kick) (Drive: 5 plays, 75 yards, 1:11; Tied 37–37)
- (0:05) UNLV – Jose Pizano 36-yard field goal (Drive: 5 plays, 62 yards, 0:39; UNLV 40–37)

Statistics	VAN	UNLV
First downs	21	21
Total yards	420	403
Rushing yards	38–83	40–127
Passing yards	337	276
Passing: Comp–Att–Int	18–37–1	21–37–2
Time of possession	30:45	28:35

Team	Category	Player	Statistics
Vanderbilt	Passing	AJ Swann	17/35, 335 yards, 3 TD, INT
Vanderbilt	Rushing	Patrick Smith	13 carries, 43 yards
Vanderbilt	Receiving	London Humphreys	3 receptions, 102 yards, TD
UNLV	Passing	Jayden Maiava	19/33, 261 yards, TD, INT
UNLV	Rushing	Jai'Den Thomas	13 carries, 50 yards, TD
UNLV	Receiving	Ricky White	12 receptions, 165 yards

=== Kentucky ===
Game Five – Kentucky Wildcats (3–0) at Vanderbilt Commodores (2–2) – Game summary

Quarter	1	2	3	4	Total
Kentucky	21	3	7	14	45
Vanderbilt	0	10	3	15	28

at FirstBank Stadium • Nashville, Tennessee

- Date: Saturday, September 23, 2023
- Game time: 11:00 a.m. CST
- Game weather: Sunny • Temperature: 75 °F (24 °C) • Wind: NE 4 miles per hour (6.4 km/h)
- Game attendance: 26,279
- Referee: Dax Gautreaux
- TV announcers (ESPN): Taylor Zarzour (play-by-play), Matt Stinchcomb (color) and Alyssa Lang (sideline)

Game information

First quarter

- (9:51) UK – JuTahn McClain 36-yard run (Alex Raynor kick) (Drive: 7 plays, 82 yards, 3:42; Kentucky 7-0)
- (8:14) UK – Maxwell Hairston 29-yard interception return (Alex Raynor kick) (Kentucky 14-0)
- (1:56) UK – Ray Davis 2-yard run (Alex Raynor kick) (Drive: 5 plays, 69 yards, 2:04; Kentucky 21-0)

Second quarter

- (4:53) UK – Alex Raynor 27-yard field goal (Drive: 13 plays, 74 yards, 6:25; Kentucky 24-0)
- (2:51) VAN – Jacob Borcila 41-yard field goal (Drive: 6 plays, 52 yards, 2:02; Kentucky 24-3)
- (0:20) VAN – Sedrick Alexander 7-yard run (Jacob Borcila kick) (Drive: 6 plays, 57 yards, 1:38; Kentucky 24-10)

Third quarter

- (11:25) VAN – Jacob Borcila 32-yard field goal (Drive: 4 plays, 3 yards, 0:51; Kentucky 24-13)
- (6:44) UK – Ray Davis 1-yard run (Alex Raynor kick) (Drive: 4 plays, 11 yards, 2:03; Kentucky 31-13)

Fourth quarter

- (10:35) UK – Dane Key 22-yard pass from Devin Leary (Alex Raynor kick) (Drive: 9 plays, 73 yards, 6:40; Kentucky 38-13)
- (8:00) VAN – Patrick Smith 2-yard run (AJ Swann pass to Quincy Skinner Jr) (Drive: 7 plays, 66 yards, 2:28; Kentucky 38-21)
- (4:15) UK – Maxwell Hairston 54-yard interception return (Alex Raynor kick) (Kentucky 45-21)
- (0:23) VAN – Kamrean Johnson 10-yard pass from Ken Seals (Jacob Borcila kick) (Drive: 14 plays, 75 yards, 3:52; Kentucky 45-28)

Statistics	UK	VAN
First downs	18	20
Total yards	60–365	74–328
Rushing yards	31–160	27–97
Passing yards	205	231
Passing: Comp–Att–Int	15–29–2	20–47–4
Time of possession	31:11	28:49

Team	Category	Player	Statistics
Kentucky	Passing	Devin Leary	15/29, 205 yards, TD, 2 INT
Kentucky	Rushing	Ray Davis	17 carries, 78 yards, 2 TD
Kentucky	Receiving	Barion Brown	4 receptions, 105 yards
Vanderbilt	Passing	AJ Swann	16/40, 189 yards, 3 INT
Vanderbilt	Rushing	Sedrick Alexander	8 carries, 37 yards, TD
Vanderbilt	Receiving	Gamarion Carter	2 receptions, 48 yards

=== Missouri ===
Game Six – No. 23 Missouri Tigers (4–0) at Vanderbilt Commodores (2–3) – Game summary

Quarter	1	2	3	4	Total
No. 23 Missouri	3	14	7	14	38
Vanderbilt	7	0	0	14	21

at FirstBank Stadium • Nashville, Tennessee

- Date: Saturday, September 30, 2023
- Game time: 3:00 p.m. CST
- Game weather: –
- Game attendance: 26,332
- Referee: Steve Marlowe
- TV announcers (SECN): Dave Neal (play-by-play), Deuce McAllister (analyst), Andraya Carter (sideline)

Game information

First quarter

- (6:57) MIZZ – Harrison Mevis 23-yard field goal (Drive: 14 plays, 69 yards, 5:43; Missouri 3–0)
- (3:46) VAN – Ken Seals 6-yard run (Jacob Borcila kick) (Drive: 8 plays, 76 yards, 3:11; Vanderbilt 7–3)

Second quarter

- (12:27) MIZZ – Cody Schrader 1-yard run (Harrison Mevis kick) (Drive: 12 plays, 85 yards, 6:19; Missouri 10–7)
- (0:55) MIZZ – Theo Wease Jr. 12-yard pass from Brady Cook (Harrison Mevis kick) (Drive: 7 plays, 59 yards, 2:27; Missouri 17–7)

Third quarter

- (10:37) MIZZ – Luther Burden III 18-yard pass from Brady Cook (Harrison Mevis kick) (Drive: 8 plays, 75 yards, 4:23; Missouri 24–7)

Fourth quarter

- (12:59) VAN – Will Sheppard 31-yard pass from Ken Seals (Jacob Borcila kick) (Drive: 2 plays, 60 yards, 0:33; Missouri 24–14)
- (11:10) MIZZ – Marquis Johnson 44-yard pass from Brady Cook (Harrison Mevis kick) (Drive: 4 plays, 65 yards, 1:49; Missouri 31–14)
- (9:36) VAN – Junior Sherrill 45-yard pass from Ken Seals (Jacob Borcila kick) (Drive: 3 plays, 75 yards, 1:34; Missouri 31–21)
- (4:23) MIZZ – Luther Burden III 17-yard pass from Brady Cook (Harrison Mevis kick) (Drive: 3 plays, 19 yards, 1:19; Missouri 38–21)

Statistics	MIZZ	VAN
First downs	28	15
Total yards	75–532	72–300
Rushing yards	34–137	20–41
Passing yards	395	259
Passing: Comp–Att–Int	33–41–0	20–31–1
Time of possession	35:58	24:02

Team	Category	Player	Statistics
Missouri	Passing	Brady Cook	33/41, 395 yards, 4 TD
Missouri	Rushing	Nathaniel Peat	12 carries, 71 yards
Missouri	Receiving	Luther Burden III	11 receptions, 140 yards, 2 TD
Vanderbilt	Passing	Ken Seals	20/31, 259 yards, 2 TD, INT
Vanderbilt	Rushing	Jayden McGowan	3 carries, 24 yards
Vanderbilt	Receiving	Will Sheppard	5 receptions, 98 yards, TD

=== at Florida ===
Game Seven: Vanderbilt Commodores (2–4) at Florida Gators (3–2) – Game summary

Quarter	1	2	3	4	Total
Vanderbilt	7	0	7	0	14
Florida	7	14	7	10	38

at Ben Hill Griffin Stadium, Gainesville, Florida

- Date: Saturday, October 7, 2023
- Game time: 4:00 p.m. EST
- Game weather: Temperature: 84 °F (29 °C) • E at 4 miles per hour (6.4 km/h) • Weather: cloudy
- Game attendance: 88,163
- Referee: Lee Hedrick
- TV announcers (SECN): Dave Neal (play-by-play), Matt Stinchcomb (analyst), and Tori Petry (sideline reporter)

Game information

First quarter

- (9:05) FLA – Ricky Pearsall 14-yard run (Trey Smack kick) (Drive: 9 plays, 93 yards, 3:27; Florida 7–0)
- (6:15) VAN – Will Sheppard 85-yard pass from Ken Seals (Jacob Borcila kick) (Drive: 2 plays, 89 yards, 0:39; Tied 7–7)

Second quarter

- (10:51) FLA – Arlis Boardingham 2-yard pass from Graham Mertz (Trey Smack kick) (Drive: 7 plays, 61 yards, 3:53; Florida 14–7)
- (0:41) FLA – Montrell Johnson Jr. 7-yard run (Trey Smack kick) (Drive: 8 plays, 71 yards, 2:01; Florida 21–7)

Third quarter

- (3:16) FLA – Eugene Wilson III 9-yard pass from Graham Mertz (Trey Smack kick) (Drive: 14 plays, 91 yards, 6:25; Florida 28–7)
- (0:44) VAN – Richie Hoskins 21-yard pass from Ken Seals (Jacob Borcila kick) (Drive: 6 plays, 75 yards, 2:32; Florida 28–14)

Fourth quarter

- (12:12) FLA – Trey Smack 40-yard field goal (Drive: 7 plays, 54 yards, 3:24; Florida 31–14)
- (7:19) FLA – Arlis Boardingham 15-yard pass from Graham Mertz (Trey Smack kick) (Drive: 4 plays, 36 yards, 2:07; Florida 38–14)

Statistics	VAN	FLA
First downs	13	25
Total yards	53–344	71–495
Rushing yards	19–64	30–215
Passing yards	280	280
Passing: Comp–Att–Int	19–34–0	34–41–1
Time of possession	23:02	36:58

Team	Category	Player	Statistics
Vanderbilt	Passing	Ken Seals	19/34, 280 yards, 2 TD
Vanderbilt	Rushing	Sedrick Alexander	8 carries, 29 yards
Vanderbilt	Receiving	Will Sheppard	3 receptions, 107 yards, TD
Florida	Passing	Graham Mertz	30/36, 254 yards, 3 TD
Florida	Rushing	Montrell Johnson Jr.	18 carries, 135 yards, TD
Florida	Receiving	Arlis Boardingham	7 receptions, 99 yards, 2 TD

=== Georgia ===
Game Eight – No. 1 Georgia Bulldogs (6–0) at Vanderbilt Commodores (2–5) – Game summary

Quarter	1	2	3	4	Total
No. 1 Georgia	7	17	3	10	37
Vanderbilt	7	0	0	13	20

at FirstBank Stadium • Nashville, Tennessee

- Date: Saturday, October 14, 2023
- Game time: 11:00 a.m. CST
- Game weather: –
- Game attendance: 28,500
- Referee: Lee Hedrick
- TV announcers (CBS): Tom McCarthy (play-by-play), Ross Tucker (analyst), Tiffany Blackmon (sideline)

Game information

First quarter

- (12:07) VAN – London Humphreys 49-yard pass from Ken Seals (Jacob Borcila kick) (Drive: 5 plays, 75 yards, 2:53; Vanderbilt 7–0)
- (5:42) UGA – Carson Beck 1-yard run (Peyton Woodring kick) (Drive: 8 plays, 71 yards, 2:56; Tied 7–7)

Second quarter

- (13:42) UGA – Kendall Milton 3-yard run (Peyton Woodring kick) (Drive: 7 plays, 77 yards, 3:44; Georgia 14–7)
- (3:40) UGA – Peyton Woodring 31-yard field goal (Drive: 16 plays, 55 yards, 7:47; Georgia 17–7)
- (0:12) UGA – Dominic Lovett 4-yard pass from Carson Beck (Peyton Woodring kick) (Drive: 4 plays, 55 yards, 0:25; Georgia 24–7)

Third quarter

- (6:22) UGA – Peyton Woodring 44-yard field goal (Drive: 19 plays, 60 yards, 8:30; Georgia 27–7)

Fourth quarter

- (14:57) VAN – Richie Hoskins 3-yard pass from Ken Seals (Jacob Borcila kick) (Drive: 13 plays, 75 yards, 6:25; Georgia 27–14)
- (9:05) UGA – Peyton Woodring 30-yard field goal (Drive: 12 plays, 66 yards, 5:45; Georgia 30–14)
- (6:14) VAN – Sedrick Alexander 1-yard run (pass failed) (Drive: 1 play, 1 yard, 0:03; Georgia 30–20)
- (3:13) UGA – Daijun Edwards 1-yard run (Peyton Woodring kick) (Drive: 5 plays, 75 yards, 3:01; Georgia 37–20)

Statistics	UGA	VAN
First downs	26	9
Total yards	78–552	47–219
Rushing yards	39–291	15–18
Passing yards	261	201
Passing: Comp–Att–Int	29–39–1	19–29–1
Time of possession	37:19	22:41

Team	Category	Player	Statistics
Georgia	Passing	Carson Beck	29/39, 261 yards, TD, INT
Georgia	Rushing	Daijun Edwards	20 carries, 146 yards, TD
Georgia	Receiving	Dominic Lovett	9 receptions, 72 yards, TD
Vanderbilt	Passing	Ken Seals	19/29, 201 yards, 2 TD, INT
Vanderbilt	Rushing	Sedrick Alexander	6 carries, 16 yards, TD
Vanderbilt	Receiving	Jayden McGowan	5 receptions, 58 yards

=== at Ole Miss ===
Game Nine – Vanderbilt Commodores (2–6) at No. 12 Ole Miss Rebels – Game summary

Quarter	1	2	3	4	Total
Vanderbilt	0	0	7	0	7
No. 12 Ole Miss	13	13	0	7	33

at Vaught-Hemingway Stadium • Oxford, Mississippi

- Date: Saturday, October 28, 2023
- Game time: 6:30 p.m. CST
- Game weather: Cloudy • Temperature: 76 °F (24 °C)
- Game attendance: 62,914
- Referee: Ken Williamson
- TV announcers (SECN): Tom Hart (play-by-play), Jordan Rodgers (analyst), Cole Cubelic (sideline)

Game information

First Quarter

- (13:21) Ole Miss – Quinshon Judkins 18 Yd Run (Caden Davis Kick)
  Ole Miss 7–0; 6 plays, 75 yards, 1:39
- (10:34) Ole Miss – Caden Davis 27 Yd Field Goal
  Ole Miss 10–0; 4 plays, 2 yards, 1:16
- (0:33) Ole Miss – Caden Davis 48 Yd Field Goal
  Ole Miss 13–0; 10 plays, 38 yards, 3:58

Second Quarter

- (11:11) Ole Miss – Jaxson Dart 1 Yd Run (Caden Davis Kick)
  Ole Miss 20–0; 6 plays, 72 yards, 2:52
- (7:40) Ole Miss – Dayton Wade 6 Yd pass from Jaxson Dart (Two-Point Pass Conversion Failed)
  Ole Miss 26–0; 5 plays, 32 yards, 1:53

Third Quarter

- (1:57) Vanderbilt – Walter Taylor 2 Yd Run (Jacob Borcila Kick)
  Ole Miss 26–7; 10 plays, 65 yards, 5:30

Fourth Quarter

- (9:33) Ole Miss – Quinshon Judkins 3 Yd Run (Caden Davis Kick)
  Ole Miss 33–7; 9 plays, 47 yards, 3:16

Statistics	VAN	MISS
First downs	13	22
Total yards	229	431
Rushing yards	169	177
Passing yards	60	254
Passing: Comp–Att–Int	8–20–2	20–29–1
Time of possession	32:59	27:01

Team	Category	Player	Statistics
Vanderbilt	Passing	Walter Taylor	4/12, 38 yards, 1 INT
Vanderbilt	Rushing	Walter Taylor	20 carries, 59 yards, 1 TD
Vanderbilt	Receiving	Junior Sherrill	2 receptions, 28 yards
Ole Miss	Passing	Jaxson Dart	19/28, 240 yards, 1 TD, 1 INT
Ole Miss	Rushing	Quinshon Judkins	17 carries, 124 yards, 2 TD
Ole Miss	Receiving	Dayton Wade	8 receptions, 120 yards, 1 TD

=== Auburn ===
Game Ten – Auburn Tigers (4–4) at Vanderbilt Commodores (2–7) – Game summary

Quarter	1	2	3	4	Total
Auburn	14	3	14	0	31
Vanderbilt	0	7	8	0	15

at FirstBank Stadium • Nashville, Tennessee

- Date: Saturday, November 4, 2023
- Game time: 4:00 PM EST
- Game weather: Sunny • Temperature: 72 °F (22 °C) • Wind: SW 5 mph
- Game attendance: 28,500
- Referee: Matt Loeffler
- TV announcers (SEC Network): Taylor Zarzour (play-by-play), Aaron Murray (analyst), Taylor Davis (sideline reporter)

Game information

First quarter

- (10:00) AUB – Jarquez Hunter 67-yard run (Alex McPherson kick) (Drive: 2 plays, 75 yards, 0:28; Auburn 7-0)
- (3:01) AUB – Jarquez Hunter 56-yard run (Alex McPherson kick) (Drive: 5 plays, 79 yards, 1:19; Auburn 14-0)

Second quarter

- (12:15) VAN – Bryce Cowan 5-yard interception return (Jacob Borcila kick) (Auburn 14-7)
- (0:20) AUB – Alex McPherson 32-yard field goal (Drive: 11 plays, 31 yards, 4:02; Auburn 17-7)

Third quarter

- (13:36) AUB – Rivaldo Fairweather 53-yard pass from Payton Thorne (Alex McPherson kick) (Drive: 3 plays, 75 yards, 1:16; Auburn 24-7)
- (9:44) AUB – Jeremiah Cobb 5-yard pass from Payton Thorne (Alex McPherson kick) (Drive: 7 plays, 64 yards, 2:13; Auburn 31-7)
- (2:43) VAN – Junior Sherrill 30-yard pass from Ken Seals (Junior Sherrill run) (Drive: 4 plays, 44 yards, 2:34; Auburn 31-15)

Fourth quarter

- No scoring

Statistics	AUB	VAN
First downs	14	12
Plays–yards	64–424	62–266
Rushes–yards	37–230	30–100
Passing yards	194	166
Passing: Comp–Att–Int	17–27–1	17–32–1
Time of possession	26:39	33:21

Team	Category	Player	Statistics
Auburn	Passing	Payton Thorne	17/27, 194 yards, 2 TD, INT
Auburn	Rushing	Jarquez Hunter	19 carries, 183 yards, 2 TD
Auburn	Receiving	Ja'Varrius Johnson	3 receptions, 62 yards
Vanderbilt	Passing	Ken Seals	16/29, 160 yards, TD, INT
Vanderbilt	Rushing	Sedrick Alexander	9 carries, 40 yards
Vanderbilt	Receiving	Will Sheppard	4 receptions, 43 yards

=== at South Carolina ===
Game Eleven – Vanderbilt Commodores (2–8) at South Carolina Gamecocks (4–6) – Game summary

Quarter	1	2	3	4	Total
Vanderbilt	0	0	0	6	6
South Carolina	6	7	14	20	47

at Williams-Brice Stadium • Columbia, South Carolina

- Date: Saturday, November 11, 2023
- Game time: 11:00 a.m. EST
- Game weather: Rainy • 50 °F (10 °C) • Wind: NE 6.5 MPH
- Game attendance: 75,682
- TV announcers (SECN): Taylor Zarzour (play-by-play), Matt Stinchcomb (analyst), Taylor Davis (sideline)

Game information

First quarter

- (6:37) SC – Alex Huntley 1-yard pass from Spencer Rattler (Two-Point Pass Conversion Failed) (Drive: 5 plays, 46 yards, 2:44; South Carolina 6–0)

Second quarter

- (14:16) SC – Spencer Rattler 1-yard Run (Mitch Jeter Kick) (Drive: 10 plays, 95 yards, 4:35; South Carolina 13–0)

Third quarter

- (7:09) SC – Ahmarean Brown 24-yard pass from Spencer Rattler (Mitch Jeter Kick) (Drive: 9 plays, 85 yards, 3:39; South Carolina 20–0)
- (5:12) SC – Mario Anderson 72-yard Run (Mitch Jeter Kick) (Drive: 2 plays, 82 yards, 0:44; South Carolina 27–0)

Fourth quarter

- (14:55) VAN – Quincy Skinner Jr. 19-yard pass from Ken Seals (Jacob Borcila PAT failed) (Drive: 12 plays, 75 yards, 5:17; South Carolina 27–6)
- (11:20) SC – Keenan Nelson Jr. 18-yard Return of Blocked Punt (Mitch Jeter Kick) (Drive: 6 plays, 16 yards, 1:57; South Carolina 34–6)
- (5:53) SC – O'Mega Blake 26-yard pass from Spencer Rattler (Mitch Jeter PAT failed) (Drive: 5 plays, 39 yards, 2:45; South Carolina 40–6)
- (2:20) SC – LaNorris Sellers 36-yard Run (Mitch Jeter Kick) (Drive: 4 plays, 44 yards, 2:02; South Carolina 47–6)

Statistics	VAN	SC
First downs	17	21
Total yards	235	487
Rushing yards	131	136
Passing yards	104	351
Passing: Comp–Att–Int	13–28–0	28–36–1
Time of possession	32:47	27:13

Team	Category	Player	Statistics
Vanderbilt	Passing	Ken Seals	13–28, 103 yards, TD
Vanderbilt	Rushing	Walter Taylor	6 carries, 39 yards
Vanderbilt	Receiving	London Humphreys	3 receptions, 33 yards
South Carolina	Passing	Spencer Rattler	28–36, 351 yards, 3 TD, INT
South Carolina	Rushing	Mario Anderson	9 carries, 102 yards, TD
South Carolina	Receiving	Xavier Legette	9 receptions, 120 yards

=== at Tennessee ===
Game Twelve – Vanderbilt Commodores (2–9) at No. 21 Tennessee Volunteers (7–4) – Game summary

Quarter	1	2	3	4	Total
Vanderbilt	7	3	0	14	24
No. 21 Tennessee	14	17	14	3	48

at Neyland Stadium, Knoxville, TN

- Date: November 25
- Game time: 3:30 p.m. EST
- Game weather: Cloudy • 59 °F (15 °C)
- Game attendance: 101,915
- Referee: Ken Williamson
- TV announcers (SECN): Dave Neal (play-by-play), Derek Mason (color), and Taylor Davis (sidelines)

Game information

First quarter

- (14:00) TENN – Ramel Keyton 56-yard pass from Joe Milton III (Charles Campbell kick) (Drive: 3 plays, 76 yards, 0:55; Tennessee 7-0)
- (11:34) VAN – Junior Sherrill 19-yard pass from AJ Swann (Jacob Borcila kick) (Drive: 4 plays, 73 yards, 2:19; Tied 7-7)
- (3:13) TENN – McCallan Castles 10-yard pass from Joe Milton III (Charles Campbell kick) (Drive: 4 plays, 39 yards, 1:03; Tennessee 14-7)

Second quarter

- (14:09) TENN – Jacob Warren 34-yard pass from Joe Milton III (Charles Campbell kick) (Drive: 4 plays, 73 yards, 1:12; Tennessee 21-7)
- (8:29) VAN – Jacob Borcila 40-yard field goal (Drive: 11 plays, 54 yards, 5:40; Tennessee 21-10)
- (6:04) TENN – Charles Campbell 24-yard field goal (Drive: 7 plays, 59 yards, 2:17; Tennessee 24-10)
- (0:05) TENN – Joe Milton III 2-yard run (Charles Campbell kick) (Drive: 8 plays, 54 yards, 2:29; Tennessee 31-10)

Third quarter

- (9:33) TENN – Ramel Keyton 46-yard pass from Joe Milton III (Charles Campbell kick) (Drive: 6 plays, 80 yards, 1:28; Tennessee 38-10)
- (0:13) TENN – Joe Milton III 2-yard run (Charles Campbell kick) (Drive: 10 plays, 81 yards, 3:30; Tennessee 45-10)

Fourth quarter

- (12:47) VAN – Ken Seals 1-yard run (Jacob Borcila kick) (Drive: 3 plays, 8 yards, 1:02; Tennessee 45-17)
- (5:36) VAN – Quincy Skinner Jr. 5-yard pass from Ken Seals (Jacob Borcila kick) (Drive: 9 plays, 77 yards, 5:08; Tennessee 45-24)
- (0:28) TENN – Charles Campbell 27-yard field goal (Drive: 17 plays, 66 yards, 5:10; Tennessee 48-24)

Statistics	VAN	TENN
First downs	22	31
Total yards	306	617
Rushing yards	78	168
Passing yards	228	449
Passing: Comp–Att–Int	21–32–0	31–47–0
Time of possession	34:21	25:39

Team	Category	Player	Statistics
Vanderbilt	Passing	AJ Swann	14/23, 167 yards, TD
Vanderbilt	Rushing	Sedrick Alexander	11 carries, 46 yards
Vanderbilt	Receiving	Junior Sherrill	4 receptions, 52 yards, TD
Tennessee	Passing	Joe Milton III	22/33, 383 yards, 4 TD
Tennessee	Rushing	Jaylen Wright	11 carries, 75 yards
Tennessee	Receiving	Ramel Keyton	4 receptions, 122 yards, 2 TD

== Coaching staff ==
Name	Position	Consecutive season at Vanderbilt in current position
Clark Lea	Head coach	3rd
Justin Lustig	Associate head coach/special teams coordinator/tight ends coach	3rd
Joey Lynch	Offensive coordinator/quarterbacks	3rd
Nick Howell	Defensive coordinator	2nd
Nick Lezynski	Linebackers coach/Defensive Run Game Coordinator	2nd
A.J. Blazek	Offensive line coach	3rd
Jovan Haye	Defensive ends coach	3rd
Larry Black	Defensive tackles coach	2nd
Alex Bailey	Wide receivers	2nd
Dan Jackson	Defensive Backs coach	2nd
Jayden Everett	Running Backs Coach	1st
