= Edge rusher =

Position in gridiron football

Defensive ends ("DE") in a 4–3 defense

Outside linebackers ("OLB") in a 3–4 defense

Edge rusher, also called an edge defender or simply edge, is a position in gridiron football. The position is used as an alternate term for a pass rushing defensive end or outside linebacker and is sometimes considered its own position entirely.

== Definition ==
Players considered to be edge rushers are usually 4–3 defensive ends or 3–4 outside linebackers. Note that 3–4 outside linebackers often act as an extension of the defensive line, in that they will attack the offensive tackles or blocking tight ends on the majority of their snaps under a majority of 3–4 schemes, though it is not uncommon to see them drop back and play a more traditional 4–3 linebacker role as well.

The word "edge" is used in the term "edge rusher" because "edge" often refers to the area outside of offensive tackles but within a couple of yards of the line of scrimmage.
