= 2026 Dallas Cowboys season =

67th season in franchise history

- Owner: Jerry Jones
- General manager: Jerry Jones
- Head coach: Brian Schottenheimer
- Offensive coordinator: Klayton Adams
- Defensive coordinator: Christian Parker
- Home stadium: AT&T Stadium

Results
- Record: 5–6
- Division place: 2nd NFC East

Uniform
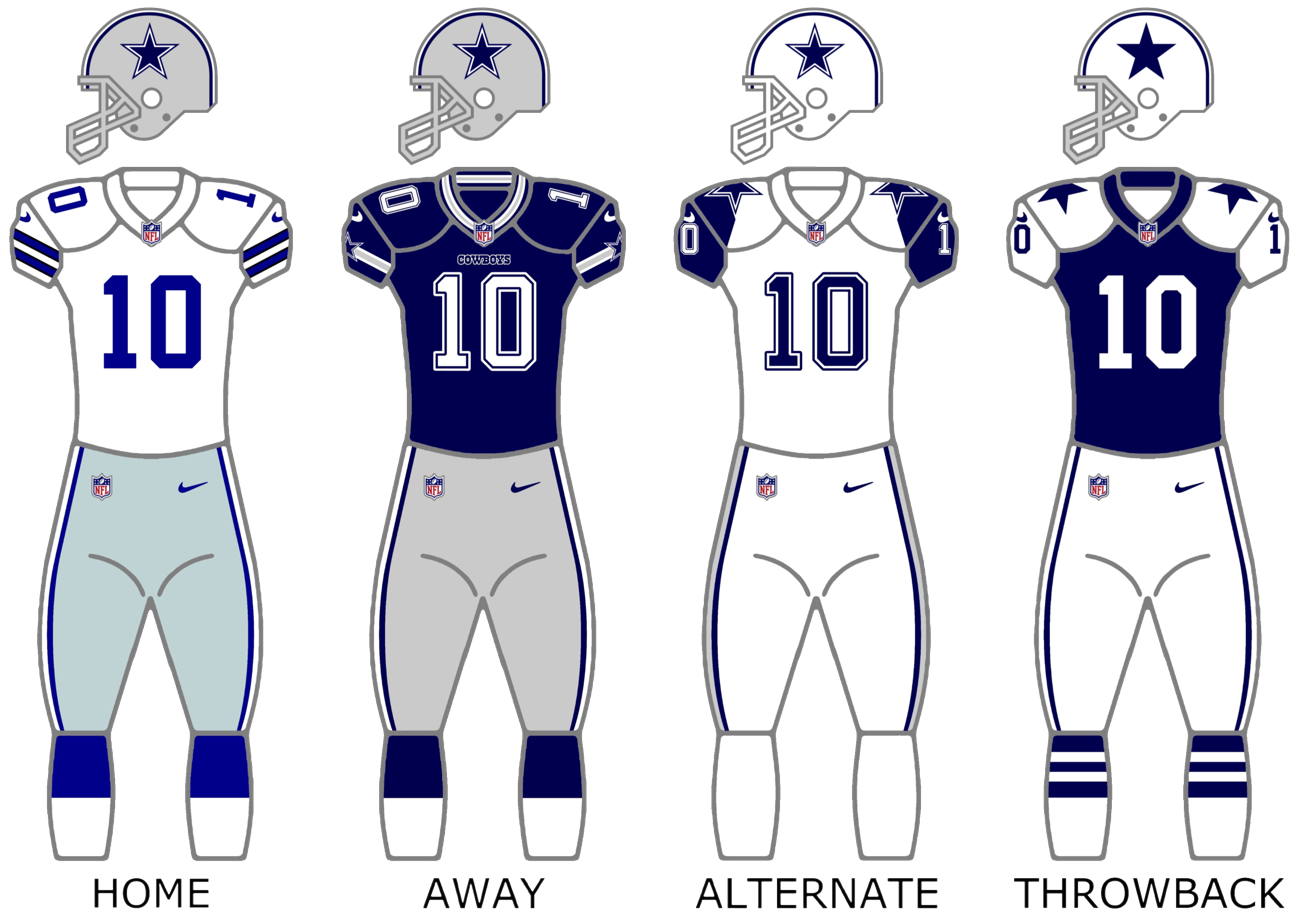

The 2026 season is the Dallas Cowboys' 67th in the National Football League (NFL) and their second under head coach Brian Schottenheimer. They will attempt to improve on their 7–9–1 record from 2025 and make the playoffs after a two-year absence.

The 2026 season was the Cowboys' first season since 2017 without cornerback C. J. Goodwin on the roster, as he announced his retirement on June 28.

== Offseason ==
=== Signings ===
Position	Player	Age	2025 team	Contract
QB	Sam Howell	25	Philadelphia Eagles	1 year, $2.5 million
C	Matt Hennessy	29	San Francisco 49ers	1 year, $1.4 million
DE	Jonathan Bullard	33	New Orleans Saints	1 year, $2 million
DE	Tyrus Wheat	26	Detroit Lions	1 year, $1.755 million
DT	Otito Ogbonnia	25	Los Angeles Chargers	1 year, $3 million
LB	Von Miller	37	Washington Commanders	1 year, $7.5 million
CB	Derion Kendrick	25	Los Angeles Rams	1 year, $1.145 million
S	P. J. Locke	29	Denver Broncos	1 year, $5 million
S	Jalen Thompson	27	Arizona Cardinals	3 years, $36 million

=== Re-signings ===
Position	Player	Age	Contract
RB	Javonte Williams	26	3 years, $24 million

=== Trade acquisitions ===
Position	Player	Age	2025 team	Traded away
OT	Broderick Jones	25	Pittsburgh Steelers	2027 third and sixth-round selections
DT	Rashan Gary	29	Green Bay Packers	2027 fourth-round selection
LB	Dee Winters	26	San Francisco 49ers	2026 fifth-round selection

=== Departures ===
Position	Player	Age	2026 team
QB	Will Grier	31	Retired
RB	Miles Sanders	29	TBD
WR	Jalen Tolbert	27	Miami Dolphins
OT	Hakeem Adeniji	29	Retired
G	Robert Jones	27	TBD
C	Brock Hoffman	27	Pittsburgh Steelers
DE	Jadeveon Clowney	33	Houston Texans
DE	Dante Fowler	32	Seattle Seahawks
DE	Payton Turner	27	Detroit Lions
DE	Sam Williams	27	Cleveland Browns
DT	Osa Odighizuwa	28	San Francisco 49ers
DT	Solomon Thomas	31	Tennessee Titans
LB	Kenneth Murray	28	Houston Texans
LB	Jack Sanborn	26	Chicago Bears
LB	Logan Wilson	29	Retired
CB	C. J. Goodwin	36	Retired
S	Juanyeh Thomas	26	TBD
S	Donovan Wilson	31	TBD

== Draft ==
2026 Dallas Cowboys draft selections
Round	Selection	Player	Position	College	Notes
1	11	Caleb Downs	S	Ohio State	From Miami
1	12	Traded to the Miami Dolphins			
1	20	Traded to the Philadelphia Eagles			From Green Bay (Note: The Cowboys traded DE Micah Parsons to the Green Bay Packers in exchange for DT Kenny Clark, as well as 2026 and 2027 first-round selections.)
1	23	Malachi Lawrence	DE	UCF	From Philadelphia
2	44	Traded to the New York Jets (Note: The Cowboys traded a 2026 second-round selection, a conditional 2027 first-round selection and DT Mazi Smith to the New York Jets in exchange for DT Quinnen Williams.)			
3	76	Traded to the Pittsburgh Steelers (Note: The Cowboys traded a 2026 third-round selection and a 2027 fifth-round selection to the Pittsburgh Steelers in exchange for WR George Pickens and a 2027 sixth-round selection.)			
3	92	Jaishawn Barham	LB	Michigan	From San Francisco (Note: The Cowboys traded DT Osa Odighizuwa to the San Francisco 49ers in exchange for a 2026 third-round selection.)
4	112	Drew Shelton	OT	Penn State	
4	114	Devin Moore	CB	Florida	From Falcons via Eagles
4	137	LT Overton	DT	Alabama	Compensatory selection; From Eagles
5	152	Traded to the San Francisco 49ers			
5	177	Traded to the Miami Dolphins			Compensatory selection
5	180	Traded to the Miami Dolphins			Compensatory selection
6	193	Traded to the New York Giants			
7	218	Anthony Smith	WR	East Carolina	From Titans (Note: The Cowboys traded DT Solomon Thomas and a 2026 seventh-round selection to the Tennessee Titans in exchange for a 2026 seventh-round selection.)
7	221	Traded to the Cincinnati Bengals			From Giants (Note: The Cowboys traded a 2026 seventh-round selection to the Cincinnati Bengals in exchange for LB Logan Wilson)
7	225	Traded to the Tennessee Titans			From Chiefs (Note: The Cowboys traded DT Solomon Thomas and a 2026 seventh-round selection to the Tennessee Titans in exchange for a 2026 seventh-round selection.)
7	228	Traded to the Buffalo Bills			

Draft trades

2026 Dallas Cowboys undrafted free agents
Name	Position	College	Ref.
Camden Brown	WR	Georgia Southern	
Tommy Dunn Jr.	DT	Kansas	
Sidney Fugar	OT	Baylor	
Kelvin Gilliam	DT	Virginia Tech	
Jordan Hudson	WR	SMU	
Langston Patterson	LB	Vanderbilt	
Shiyazh Pete	OT	Kentucky	
Dominic Richardson	RB	Tulsa	
DJ Rogers	TE	TCU	
Michael Trigg	TE	Baylor	
DJ Wingfield	G	USC	
DJ Withers	DT	Kansas	

== Staff ==
Dallas Cowboys staff
Front office: Owner/president/general manager – Jerry Jones; COO/executive vice president/director of player personnel – Stephen Jones; Executive vice president/chief brand officer – Charlotte Jones Anderson; Executive vice president/chief of sales – Jerry Jones Jr.; Vice president of player personnel – Will McClay; Vice president of football operations/football administration – Todd Williams; Senior director of football administration and technology – Jason McKay; Director of college scouting – Mitch LaPoint; Assistant director of college scouting – Chris Vaughn; Director of pro scouting – Alex Loomis; Director of advance scouting – Keith O'Quinn; Vice president of football strategy and operations – John Park; Senior director of salary cap/player contracts – Adam Prasifka; Director of player development – Bryan Wansley; Head coach: Head coach – Brian Schottenheimer; Offensive coaches: Offensive coordinator – Klayton Adams; Quarterbacks – Steve Shimko; Running backs – Derrick Foster; Assistant running backs – Jamel Mutunga; Wide receivers – Junior Adams; Assistant wide receivers – Stephen Bravo-Brown; Tight ends – Lunda Wells; Offensive line – Conor Riley; Assistant offensive line/quality control – Kyle Fuller; Pass game specialist – Ken Dorsey	Defensive coaches: Defensive coordinator – Christian Parker; Senior defensive assistant – Mike Pettine; Defensive line – Marcus Dixon; Assistant defensive line – Demeitre Brim; Outside linebackers – Chidera Uzo-Diribe; Inside linebackers – Scott Symons; Assistant linebackers – J.J. Clark; Defensive backs/pass game coordinator – Derrick Ansley; Secondary – Ryan Smith; Assistant secondary – Robert Muschamp; Pass rush consultant – Brandon Jordan; Special teams coaches: Special teams coordinator – Nick Sorensen; Assistant special teams – Carlos Polk; Coaching operations/support staff: Chief of staff – Tyler Boyles; Game management coordinator – Ryan Feder; Strength and conditioning: Strength and conditioning – Harold Nash; Assistant strength and conditioning – Cedric Smith; Assistant strength and conditioning – Kendall Smith; Assistant strength and conditioning/sport science – Braylon Tatum; → Coaching staff → Front office → More NFL staffs

== Current roster ==
Dallas Cowboys roster
Quarterbacks (QB): 16 Sam Howell; 4 Dak Prescott; Running backs (RB): 30 Hunter Luepke FB; 33 Javonte Williams; Wide receivers (WR): 80 Camden Brown; 19 Ryan Flournoy; 88 CeeDee Lamb; 18 Jonathan Mingo; 3 George Pickens; 9 KaVontae Turpin RS; Tight ends (TE): 87 Jake Ferguson; 84 James Mitchell; 86 Luke Schoonmaker; 89 Brevyn Spann-Ford	Offensive linemen (OL): 66 T. J. Bass G; 56 Cooper Beebe C; 52 Tyler Booker G; 60 Tyler Guyton T; 77 Broderick Jones T; 51 Nick Leverett G; 67 Drew Shelton T; 73 Tyler Smith G; 78 Terence Steele T; Defensive linemen (DL): 90 Jonathan Bullard DT; 97 Kenny Clark DT; 93 Elijah Garcia DT; 91 Otito Ogbonnia DT; 99 LT Overton DT; 92 Quinnen Williams DT	Linebackers (LB): 55 Jaishawn Barham MLB; 45 Justin Barron MLB; 6 Donovan Ezeiruaku OLB; 7 Rashan Gary OLB; 41 James Houston OLB; 50 Shemar James MLB; 35 Marist Liufau OLB; 40 Von Miller OLB; 0 DeMarvion Overshown MLB; 53 Dee Winters MLB; Defensive backs (DB): 14 Markquese Bell S; 11 Alijah Clark S; 13 Caleb Downs S; 2 Cobie Durant CB; 24 Malik Hooker S; 1 P. J. Locke S; 25 Joey Porter Jr. CB; 28 Shavon Revel CB; 23 Ameer Speed CB; 43 Juanyeh Thomas S; Special teams (ST): 5 Bryan Anger P; 17 Brandon Aubrey K; 44 Trent Sieg LS	Practice squad: 37 Israel Abanikanda RB; 36 Jashaun Corbin RB; 95 Tommy Dunn DT; 39 Tyrek Funderburk CB; 81 Jordan Hudson WR; 79 Marcellus Johnson T; 15 Derion Kendrick CB; 63 Jake Kubas G; 58 Isaiah Land OLB; 31 Kendre Miller RB; 64 Wanya Morris T; 96 Adedayo Odeleye DT (IPP); 42 Curtis Robinson LB; 83 Anthony Smith WR; 10 Kyle Trask QB; 54 Bralen Trice OLB; 46 Michael Trigg TE; Reserve: 26 DaRon Bland CB (IR); 20 Malik Davis RB (IR); 85 Princeton Fant TE (IR); 94 Kelvin Gilliam DT (IR); 32 Tyler Goodson RB (IR); 72 Matt Hennessy C (IR); 57 Malachi Lawrence OLB (IR); 29 Devin Moore CB (IR/DFR); 34 Jalen Thompson S (IR/DFR) 52 active, 16 practice squad (1 IPP), 9 reserve As of November 21, 2026. Rookies in italics.; Roster; Depth chart; Transactions

== Preseason ==
Week	Date	Opponent	Result	Record	Venue	Recap
1	August 15	at Seattle Seahawks	W 17–7	1–0	Lumen Field	Recap
2	August 22	at Arizona Cardinals	W 34–13	2–0	State Farm Stadium	Recap
3	August 28	New Orleans Saints	L 24–27	2–1	AT&T Stadium	Recap

== Regular season ==
=== Schedule ===
Week	Date	Time (CT)	Opponent	Result	Record	Venue	Network	Recap
1	September 13	7:20 p.m.	at **New York Giants**	**L** 20–28	0–1	MetLife Stadium	NBC	Recap
2	September 20	3:25 p.m.	**Washington Commanders**	**W** 37–20	1–1	AT&T Stadium	Fox	Recap
3	September 27	3:25 p.m.	Baltimore Ravens	**L** 31–34	1–2	(Brazil) Maracanã Stadium (Rio de Janeiro)	CBS	Recap
4	October 4	12:00 p.m.	at Houston Texans	**W** 34–30	2–2	Reliant Stadium	Fox	Recap
5	October 8	7:15 p.m.	Tampa Bay Buccaneers	**L** 16–24	2–3	AT&T Stadium	Prime Video	Recap
6	October 18	7:20 p.m.	at Green Bay Packers	**L** 13–23	2–4	Lambeau Field	NBC	Recap
7	October 26	7:15 p.m.	at **Philadelphia Eagles**	**W** 38–21	3–4	Lincoln Financial Field	ESPN/ABC	Recap
8	November 1	12:00 p.m.	Arizona Cardinals	**L** 30–33 (OT)	3–5	AT&T Stadium	Fox	Recap
9	November 8	12:00 p.m.	at Indianapolis Colts	**W** 27–23	4–5	Lucas Oil Stadium	Fox	Recap
10	November 15	3:25 p.m.	San Francisco 49ers	**L** 40–46	4–6	AT&T Stadium	Fox	Recap
11	November 22	12:00 p.m.	Tennessee Titans	**W** 51–30	5–6	AT&T Stadium	Fox	Recap
12	November 26	3:30 p.m.	**Philadelphia Eagles**			AT&T Stadium	Fox	
13	December 7	7:15 p.m.	at Seattle Seahawks			Lumen Field	ESPN/ABC	
14	Bye							
15	December 20	3:25 p.m.	at Los Angeles Rams			SoFi Stadium	CBS	
16	December 27	7:20 p.m.	Jacksonville Jaguars			AT&T Stadium	NBC	
17	January 3	12:00 p.m.	**New York Giants**			AT&T Stadium	Fox	
18	January 9/10	TBD	at **Washington Commanders**			Northwest Stadium	TBD	

Notes

- Intra-division opponents are in **bold** text.
- Networks, dates and times from Weeks 13–17 are subject to change as a result of flexible scheduling.
- The date, time and network for Week 18 will be finalized at the end of Week 17.

=== Game summaries ===
==== Week 1: at New York Giants ====
Week 1: Dallas Cowboys at New York Giants – Game summary

Quarter	1	2	3	4	Total
Cowboys	0	7	7	6	**20**
**Giants**	7	7	7	7	**28**

at MetLife Stadium, East Rutherford, New Jersey

- Date: September 13
- Game time: 8:20 p.m. EDT/7:20 p.m. CDT
- Game weather: Fair, 80 °F (27 °C)
- Game attendance: 83,286
- Referee: Carl Cheffers
- TV announcers (NBC): Mike Tirico, Cris Collinsworth and Melissa Stark
- Recap, Game Book

Game information

**First quarter**

- NYG – Cam Skattebo 3-yard run (Dominic Zvada kick), 6:40. Giants 7–0. **Drive: 10 plays, 83 yards, 6:13.**

**Second quarter**

- DAL – CeeDee Lamb 1-yard pass from Dak Prescott (Brandon Aubrey kick), 5:44. Tied 7–7. **Drive: 10 plays, 85 yards, 6:44.**
- NYG – Isaiah Likely 15-yard pass from Jaxson Dart (Dominic Zvada kick), 0:20. Giants 14–7. **Drive: 6 plays, 55 yards, 0:29.**

**Third quarter**

- NYG – Isaiah Likely 2-yard pass from Jaxson Dart (Dominic Zvada kick), 6:59. Giants 21–7. **Drive: 6 plays, 55 yards, 0:29.**
- DAL – Javonte Williams 1-yard run (Brandon Aubrey kick), 0:37. Giants 21–14. **Drive: 12 plays, 75 yards, 6:22.**

**Fourth quarter**

- NYG – Devin Singletary 9-yard pass from Jaxson Dart (Dominic Zvada kick), 7:26. Giants 28–14. **Drive: 13 plays, 65 yards, 8:11.**
- DAL – Javonte Williams 17-yard pass from Dak Prescott (kick failed), 5:21. Giants 28–20. **Drive: 9 plays, 74 yards, 2:05.**

**Top passers**

- DAL – Dak Prescott – 22/34, 175 yards, 2 TD, INT
- NYG – Jaxson Dart – 23/29, 230 yards, 3 TD

**Top rushers**

- DAL – Javonte Williams – 12 rushes, 41 yards, TD
- NYG – Cam Skattebo – 18 rushes, 81 yards, TD

**Top receivers**

- DAL – CeeDee Lamb – 5 receptions, 44 yards, TD
- NYG – Isaiah Likely – 8 receptions, 78 yards, 2 TD

This marked both the Cowboys' second straight loss to the Giants and the first time they lost consecutive road games in New York since 2015 and 2016.

==== Week 2: vs. Washington Commanders ====
Week 2: Washington Commanders at Dallas Cowboys – Game summary

Quarter	1	2	3	4	Total
Commanders	0	10	3	7	**20**
**Cowboys**	10	7	10	10	**37**

at AT&T Stadium, Arlington, Texas

- Date: September 20
- Game time: 3:25 p.m. CDT
- Game weather: None (retractable roof closed)
- Game attendance: 93,188
- Referee: Shawn Hochuli
- TV announcers (Fox): Kevin Burkhardt, Tom Brady, Erin Andrews and Tom Rinaldi
- Recap, Game Book

Game information

**First quarter**

- DAL – CeeDee Lamb 3-yard pass from Dak Prescott (Brandon Aubrey kick), 10:01. Cowboys 7–0. **Drive: 10 plays, 66 yards, 4:59.**
- DAL – Brandon Aubrey 25-yard field goal, 5:01. Cowboys 10–0. **Drive: 8 plays, 58 yards, 3:04.**

**Second quarter**

- WSH – Drew Stevens 27-yard field goal, 13:14. Cowboys 10–3. **Drive: 13 plays, 73 yards, 6:47.**
- DAL – Jake Ferguson 10-yard pass from Dak Prescott (Brandon Aubrey kick), 9:55. Cowboys 17–3. **Drive: 7 plays, 65 yards, 3:19.**
- WSH – Stefon Diggs 4-yard pass from Jayden Daniels (Drew Stevens kick), 6:37. Cowboys 17–10. **Drive: 8 plays, 66 yards, 3:18.**

**Third quarter**

- WSH – Drew Stevens 47-yard field goal, 12:50. Cowboys 17–13. **Drive: 6 plays, 31 yards, 2:10.**
- DAL – Brandon Aubrey 44-yard field goal, 7:20. Cowboys 20–13. **Drive: 9 plays, 38 yards, 5:30.**
- DAL – Jake Ferguson 12-yard pass from Dak Prescott (Brandon Aubrey kick), 6:32. Cowboys 27–13. **Drive: 2 plays, 13 yards, 0:36.**

**Fourth quarter**

- DAL – Brandon Aubrey 60-yard field goal, 13:22. Cowboys 30–13. **Drive: 7 plays, 17 yards, 3:31.**
- WSH – Stefon Diggs 20-yard pass from Marcus Mariota (Drew Stevens kick), 9:03. Cowboys 30–20. **Drive: 10 plays, 73 yards, 4:19.**
- DAL – CeeDee Lamb 24-yard pass from Dak Prescott (Brandon Aubrey kick), 3:07. Cowboys 37–20. **Drive: 11 plays, 83 yards, 5:56.**

**Top passers**

- WSH – Marcus Mariota – 11/16, 111 yards, TD
- DAL – Dak Prescott – 26/31, 279 yards, 4 TD

**Top rushers**

- WSH – Jayden Daniels – 7 rushes, 69 yards
- DAL – Javonte Williams – 12 rushes, 30 yards

**Top receivers**

- WSH – Terry McLaurin – 2 receptions, 50 yards
- DAL – CeeDee Lamb – 8 receptions, 153 yards, 2 TD

During the game, Dak Prescott threw four touchdown passes and he surpassed Tony Romo for the most passing touchdowns in Cowboys history.

==== Week 3: vs. Baltimore Ravens ====
NFL International Series

Week 3: Baltimore Ravens at Dallas Cowboys – Game summary

Quarter	1	2	3	4	Total
**Ravens**	7	10	7	10	**34**
Cowboys	10	3	8	10	**31**

at Maracanã Stadium, Rio de Janeiro, Brazil

- Date: September 27
- Game time: 5:25 p.m. BRT/3:25 p.m. CDT
- Game weather: Overcast, 77 °F (25 °C)
- Game attendance: 72,792
- Referee: John Hussey
- TV announcers (CBS): Jim Nantz, J. J. Watt and Tracy Wolfson
- Recap, Game Book

Game information

**First quarter**

- DAL – Brandon Aubrey 28-yard field goal, 8:10. Cowboys 3–0. **Drive: 11 plays, 57 yards, 5:17.**
- DAL – Javonte Williams 2-yard run (Brandon Aubrey kick), 4:32. Cowboys 10–0. **Drive: 5 plays, 30 yards, 1:34.**
- BAL – Derrick Henry 4-yard run (Tyler Loop kick), 1:18. Cowboys 10–7. **Drive: 6 plays, 60 yards, 3:14.**

**Second quarter**

- BAL – Derrick Henry 3-yard run (Tyler Loop kick), 11:23. Ravens 14–10. **Drive: 6 plays, 89 yards, 3:30.**
- BAL – Tyler Loop 27-yard field goal, 4:45. Ravens 17–10. **Drive: 9 plays, 34 yards, 4:34.**
- DAL – Brandon Aubrey 38-yard field goal, 0:18. Ravens 17–13. **Drive: 11 plays, 45 yards, 4:26.**

**Third quarter**

- BAL – Chris Moore 4-yard pass from Lamar Jackson (Tyler Loop kick), 3:44. Ravens 24–13. **Drive: 4 plays, 51 yards, 2:10.**
- DAL – Jake Ferguson 19-yard pass from Dak Prescott (Dak Prescott-CeeDee lamb pass), 1:48. Ravens 24–21. **Drive: 6 plays, 67 yards, 1:56.**

**Fourth quarter**

- DAL – KaVontae Turpin 9-yard run (Brandon Aubrey kick), 9:42. Cowboys 28–24. **Drive: 7 plays, 96 yards, 3:21.**
- BAL – Matthew Hibner 2-yard pass from Lamar Jackson (Tyler Loop kick), 1:30. Ravens 31–28. **Drive: 11 plays, 64 yards, 4:15.**
- BAL – Tyler Loop 56-yard field goal, 0:01. Ravens 34–31. **Drive: 2 plays, 27 yards, 0:07.**

**Top passers**

- BAL – Lamar Jackson – 15/20, 186 yards, 2 TD
- DAL – Dak Prescott – 25/40, 276 yards, TD

**Top rushers**

- BAL – Derrick Henry – 26 rushes, 89 yards, 2 TD
- DAL – Javonte Williams – 19 rushes, 98 yards, TD

**Top receivers**

- BAL – Zay Flowers – 5 receptions, 84 yards
- DAL – CeeDee Lamb – 7 receptions, 112 yards

==== Week 4: at Houston Texans ====
Week 4: Dallas Cowboys at Houston Texans – Game summary

Quarter	1	2	3	4	Total
**Cowboys**	3	3	14	14	**34**
Texans	10	6	7	7	**30**

at Reliant Stadium, Houston, Texas

- Date: October 4
- Game time: 12:00 p.m. CDT
- Game weather: None (retractable roof closed)
- Game attendance: 71,227
- Referee: Brad Allen
- TV announcers (Fox): Kenny Albert, Greg Olsen and Pam Oliver
- Recap, Game Book

Game information

**First quarter**

- HOU – Nico Collins 7-yard pass from C. J. Stroud (Ka'imi Fairbairn kick), 10:01. Texans 7–0. **Drive: 8 plays, 85 yards, 4:59.**
- DAL – Brandon Aubrey 39-yard field goal, 5:10. Texans 7–3. **Drive: 10 plays, 44 yards, 4:51.**
- HOU – Ka'imi Fairbairn 51-yard field goal, 1:49. Texans 10–3. **Drive: 6 plays, 59 yards, 3:21.**

**Second quarter**

- DAL – Brandon Aubrey 50-yard field goal, 12:30. Texans 10–6. **Drive: 8 plays, 36 yards, 4:19.**
- HOU – Ka'imi Fairbairn 39-yard field goal, 2:05. Texans 13–6. **Drive: 6 plays, 28 yards, 2:53.**
- HOU – Ka'imi Fairbairn 54-yard field goal, 0:00. Texans 16–6. **Drive: 4 plays, 9 yards, 0:26.**

**Third quarter**

- DAL – Javonte Williams 8-yard run (Brandon Aubrey kick), 12:55. Texans 16–13. **Drive: 4 plays, 49 yards, 2:05.**
- HOU – Nico Collins 22-yard pass from C. J. Stroud (Ka'imi Fairbairn kick), 10:50. Texans 23–13. **Drive: 4 plays, 38 yards, 2:05.**
- DAL – Javonte Williams 1-yard run (Brandon Aubrey kick), 6:49. Texans 23–20. **Drive: 7 plays, 64 yards, 4:01.**

**Fourth quarter**

- DAL – Javonte Williams 2-yard run (Brandon Aubrey kick), 11:17. Cowboys 27–23. **Drive: 14 plays, 81 yards, 8:47.**
- HOU – Woody Marks 6-yard run (Ka'imi Fairbairn kick), 2:23. Texans 30–27. **Drive: 9 plays, 87 yards, 4:32.**
- DAL – CeeDee Lamb 12-yard pass from Dak Prescott (Brandon Aubrey kick), 0:40. Cowboys 34–30. **Drive: 11 plays, 74 yards, 1:43.**

**Top passers**

- DAL – Dak Prescott – 32/45, 335 yards, TD
- HOU – C. J. Stroud – 21/31, 347 yards, 2 TD

**Top rushers**

- DAL – Javonte Williams – 19 rushes, 62 yards, 3 TD
- HOU – David Montgomery – 10 rushes, 24 yards

**Top receivers**

- DAL – CeeDee Lamb – 17 receptions, 189 yards, TD
- HOU – Nico Collins – 7 receptions, 118 yards, 2 TD

This marked the Cowboys' first win against the Texans since 2022 and their first win in Houston since 2010.

==== Week 5: vs. Tampa Bay Buccaneers ====
Week 5: Tampa Bay Buccaneers at Dallas Cowboys – Game summary

Quarter	1	2	3	4	Total
**Buccaneers**	0	7	17	0	**24**
Cowboys	7	3	0	6	**16**

at AT&T Stadium, Arlington, Texas

- Date: October 8
- Game time: 7:15 p.m. CDT
- Game weather: None (retractable roof closed)
- Game attendance: 92,351
- Referee: Alex Moore
- TV announcers (Prime Video): Al Michaels, Kirk Herbstreit and Kaylee Hartung
  Game simulcast on KDFW and WTVT.
- Recap, Game Book

Game information

**First quarter**

- DAL – Javonte Williams 1-yard run (Brandon Aubrey kick), 10:51. Cowboys 7–0. **Drive: 9 plays, 70 yards, 4:09.**

**Second quarter**

- TB – Bucky Irving 5-yard pass from Jalon Daniels (Chase McLaughlin kick), 14:53. Tied 7–7. **Drive: 15 plays, 73 yards, 10:58.**
- DAL – Brandon Aubrey 41-yard field goal, 0:21. Cowboys 10–7. **Drive: 6 plays, 64 yards, 1:31.**

**Third quarter**

- TB – Emeka Egbuka 14-yard run (Chase McLaughlin kick), 14:00. Buccaneers 14–10. **Drive: 2 plays, 86 yards, 1:00.**
- TB – Bucky Irving 1-yard run (Chase McLaughlin kick), 7:31. Buccaneers 21–10. **Drive: 5 plays, 75 yards, 3:12.**
- TB – Chase McLaughlin 41-yard field goal, 2:58. Buccaneers 24–10. **Drive: 8 plays, 14 yards, 4:26.**

**Fourth quarter**

- DAL – George Pickens 18-yard pass from Dak Prescott (pass failed), 5:26. Buccaneers 24–16. **Drive: 10 plays, 99 yards, 3:06.**

**Top passers**

- TB – Jalon Daniels – 19/25, 189 yards, TD
- DAL – Dak Prescott – 24/42, 316 yards, TD, 2 INT

**Top rushers**

- TB – Bucky Irving – 21 rushes, 165 yards, TD
- DAL – Javonte Williams – 12 rushes, 45 yards, TD

**Top receivers**

- TB – Tez Johnson – 1 reception, 64 yards
- DAL – George Pickens – 9 receptions, 130 yards, TD

==== Week 6: at Green Bay Packers ====
Week 6: Dallas Cowboys at Green Bay Packers – Game summary

Quarter	1	2	3	4	Total
Cowboys	0	0	7	6	**13**
**Packers**	7	10	3	3	**23**

at Lambeau Field, Green Bay, Wisconsin

- Date: October 18
- Game time: 7:20 p.m. CDT
- Game weather: Clear, 59 °F (15 °C)
- Game attendance: 77,383
- Referee: Craig Wrolstad
- TV announcers (NBC): Mike Tirico, Cris Collinsworth and Melissa Stark
- Recap, Game Book

Game information

**First quarter**

- GB – Matthew Golden 9-yard pass from Jordan Love (Trey Smack kick), 4:43. Packers 7–0. **Drive: 14 plays, 90 yards, 6:30.**

**Second quarter**

- GB – Trey Smack 25-yard field goal, 5:58. Packers 10–0. **Drive: 15 plays, 73 yards, 8:17.**
- GB – Jordan Love 1-yard run (Trey Smack kick), 0:23. Packers 17–0. **Drive: 9 plays, 77 yards, 1:27.**

**Third quarter**

- DAL – Javonte Williams 1-yard run (Brandon Aubrey kick), 9:19. Packers 17–7. **Drive: 9 plays, 46 yards, 4:32.**
- GB – Trey Smack 44-yard field goal, 5:02. Packers 20–7. **Drive: 11 plays, 42 yards, 4:17.**

**Fourth quarter**

- GB – Trey Smack 29-yard field goal, 10:06. Packers 23–7. **Drive: 9 plays, 38 yards, 3:24.**
- DAL – Ryan Flournoy 6-yard pass from Dak Prescott (pass failed), 0:44. Packers 23–13. **Drive: 13 plays, 78 yards, 2:17.**

**Top passers**

- DAL – Dak Prescott – 34/54, 258 yards, TD, 2 INT
- GB – Jordan Love – 23/41, 276 yards, TD, INT

**Top rushers**

- DAL – Javonte Williams – 11 rushes, 41 yards, TD
- GB – Pierre Strong Jr. – 11 rushes, 28 yards

**Top receivers**

- DAL – George Pickens – 6 receptions, 73 yards
- GB – Matthew Golden – 6 receptions, 104 yards, TD

The Cowboys' offensive woes continued at Lambeau Field, where Dak Prescott threw two interceptions in the second quarter, resulting in a 17–0 halftime deficit that the Cowboys could not recover from, as they would go on to lose to the Packers 23–13. They once again failed to beat the Packers, not having done so since 2016.

==== Week 7: at Philadelphia Eagles ====
Week 7: Dallas Cowboys at Philadelphia Eagles – Game summary

Quarter	1	2	3	4	Total
**Cowboys**	10	10	8	10	**38**
Eagles	7	7	7	0	**21**

at Lincoln Financial Field, Philadelphia, Pennsylvania

- Date: October 26
- Game time: 8:15 p.m. EDT/7:15 p.m. CDT
- Game weather: Clear, 59 °F (15 °C)
- Game attendance: 69,879
- Referee: Alex Kemp
- TV announcers (ESPN/ABC): Joe Buck, Troy Aikman and Lisa Salters
- Recap, Game Book

Game information

**First quarter**

- DAL – Brandon Aubrey 55-yard field goal, 12:30. Cowboys 3–0. **Drive: 7 plays, 28 yards, 2:30.**
- PHI – Saquon Barkley 8-yard run (Jake Elliott kick), 10:25. Eagles 7–3. **Drive: 4 plays, 75 yards, 2:08.**
- DAL – CeeDee Lamb 9-yard pass from Dak Prescott (Brandon Aubrey kick), 5:32. Cowboys 10–7. **Drive: 9 plays, 82 yards, 4:53.**

**Second quarter**

- PHI – Dameon Pierce 5-yard run (Jake Elliott kick), 13:25. Eagles 14–10. **Drive: 13 plays, 76 yards, 7:07.**
- DAL – George Pickens 21-yard pass from Dak Prescott (Brandon Aubrey kick), 5:37. Cowboys 17–14. **Drive: 14 plays, 81 yards, 7:48.**
- DAL – Brandon Aubrey 27-yard field goal, 0:00. Cowboys 20–14. **Drive: 8 plays, 78 yards, 1:14.**

**Third quarter**

- PHI – Makai Lemon 4-yard pass from Tanner McKee (Brandon Aubrey kick), 5:44. Eagles 21–20. **Drive: 17 plays, 84 yards, 9:16.**
- DAL – CeeDee Lamb 16-yard pass from Dak Prescott (Dak Prescott run), 1:30. Cowboys 28–21. **Drive: 9 plays, 61 yards, 4:14.**

**Fourth quarter**

- DAL – Brandon Aubrey 24-yard field goal, 9:10. Cowboys 31–21. **Drive: 9 plays, 78 yards, 5:07.**
- DAL – Javonte Williams 2-yard run (Brandon Aubrey kick), 2:21. Cowboys 38–21. **Drive: 6 plays, 16 yards, 2:27.**

**Top passers**

- DAL – Dak Prescott – 15/27, 212 yards, 3 TD
- PHI – Tanner McKee – 23/35, 211 yards, TD, INT

**Top rushers**

- DAL – Javonte Williams – 25 rushes, 155 yards, TD
- PHI – Saquon Barkley – 7 rushes, 62 yards, TD

**Top receivers**

- DAL – CeeDee Lamb – 5 receptions, 72 yards, 2 TD
- PHI – Makai Lemon – 7 receptions, 67 yards, 2 TD

After a back-and-forth first half against the injury-riddled Eagles, the Cowboys pulled away in the second half with 18 unanswered points, securing their first road win over the Eagles since 2021. CeeDee Lamb caught two touchdowns in the win, including the eventual game-winner, as Dallas improved to 3–4 on the year with the 38–21 blowout win.

==== Week 8: vs. Arizona Cardinals ====
Week 8: Arizona Cardinals at Dallas Cowboys – Game summary

Quarter	1	2	3	4	OT	Total
**Cardinals**	0	3	7	20	3	**33**
Cowboys	7	7	3	13	0	**30**

at AT&T Stadium, Arlington, Texas

- Date: November 1
- Game time: 12:00 p.m. CST
- Game weather: None (retractable roof closed)
- Game attendance: 90,763
- Referee: Ronald Torbert
- TV announcers (Fox): Joe Davis, Greg Olsen, and Pam Oliver
- Recap, Game Book

Game information

**First quarter**

- DAL – James Mitchell 0-yard fumble recovery (Brandon Aubrey kick), 2:33. Cowboys 7–0. **Drive: 2 plays, 5 yards, 0:33.**

**Second quarter**

- DAL – Ryan Flournoy 9-yard pass from Dak Prescott (Brandon Aubrey kick), 5:16. Cowboys 14–0. **Drive: 12 plays, 85 yards, 7:05.**
- ARI – Chad Ryland 37-yard field goal, 1:13. Cowboys 14–3. **Drive: 11 plays, 56 yards, 4:03.**

**Third quarter**

- DAL – Brandon Aubrey 31-yard field goal, 6:37. Cowboys 17–3. **Drive: 15 plays, 70 yards, 8:23.**
- ARI – Tyler Allgeier 63-yard run (Chad Ryland kick), 0:57. Cowboys 17–10. **Drive: 2 plays, 70 yards, 0:38.**

**Fourth quarter**

- DAL – Dak Prescott 5-yard run (Brandon Aubrey kick), 14:20. Cowboys 24–10. **Drive: 6 plays, 62 yards, 1:27.**
- ARI – Tyler Allgeier 5-yard pass from Gardner Minshew (Chad Ryland kick), 10:47. Cowboys 24–17. **Drive: 7 plays, 80 yards, 3:33.**
- DAL – Brandon Aubrey 35-yard field goal, 3:54. Cowboys 27–17. **Drive: 15 plays, 56 yards, 6:53.**
- ARI – Trey McBride 14-yard pass from Gardner Minshew (Chad Ryland kick), 2:11. Cowboys 27–24. **Drive: 6 plays, 58 yards, 1:43.**
- DAL – Brandon Aubrey 41-yard field goal, 3:54. Cowboys 30–24. **Drive: 15 plays, 56 yards, 6:53.**
- ARI – Michael Wilson 13-yard pass from Gardner Minshew (kick failed, wide left), 0:00. Tied 30–30. **Drive: 8 plays, 80 yards, 1:03.**

**Overtime**

- ARI – Chad Ryland 42-yard field goal, 2:53. Cardinals 33–30. **Drive: 8 plays, 44 yards, 4:09.**

**Top passers**

- ARI – Gardner Minshew – 17/23, 188 yards, 3 TD
- DAL – Dak Prescott – 19/29, 195 yards, 1 TD

**Top rushers**

- ARI – Tyler Allgeier – 11 rushes, 147 yards, TD
- DAL – Javonte Williams – 24 rushes, 56 yards

**Top receivers**

- ARI – Michael Wilson – 8 receptions, 111 yards, TD
- DAL – CeeDee Lamb – 7 receptions, 58 yards

Despite holding a 14–3 lead at halftime, a 17–3 lead late in the third quarter, and a 24–10 lead early in the fourth quarter, the Cowboys could not stop the Cardinals, who rallied with three late touchdowns, including a game-tying catch by Michael Wilson with six seconds left. However, Cardinals kicker Chad Ryland missed the go-ahead extra point, sending the game to overtime. Despite forcing a three-and-out on the Cardinals' opening possession, the Cowboys failed to get any momentum of their own and went three and out themselves. Arizona subsequently drove into Dallas territory, where Ryland converted a 42-yard field goal to win the game for the Cardinals. Dallas dropped to 3–5 on the year with the stunning loss. It was their fifth straight loss to the Cardinals and their ninth loss in their last 10 meetings with Arizona, whom they last defeated in 2017. The Cowboys also dropped to 0–5 against the Cardinals at AT&T Stadium, their worst record against any visiting team there; their last home win over the Cardinals was in 2005 at Texas Stadium.

==== Week 9: at Indianapolis Colts ====
Week 9: Dallas Cowboys at Indianapolis Colts – Game summary

Quarter	1	2	3	4	Total
**Cowboys**	3	14	3	7	**27**
Colts	7	0	10	6	**23**

at Lucas Oil Stadium, Indianapolis, Indiana

- Date: November 8
- Game time: 1:00 p.m. EST/12:00 p.m. CST
- Game weather: Sunny, 54 °F (12 °C) (retractable roof open)
- Game attendance: 65,479
- Referee: Clay Martin
- TV announcers (Fox): Adam Amin, Drew Brees and Kristina Pink
- Recap, Game Book

Game information

**First quarter**

- DAL – Brandon Aubrey 45-yard field goal, 11:45. Cowboys 3–0. **Drive: 7 plays, 34 yards, 3:15.**
- IND – Seth McGowan 2-yard run (Spencer Shrader kick), 6:13. Colts 7–3. **Drive: 6 plays, 19 yards, 2:36.**

**Second quarter**

- DAL – Jake Ferguson 10-yard pass from Dak Prescott (Brandon Aubrey kick), 14:08. Cowboys 10–7. **Drive: 15 plays, 65 yards, 7:05.**
- DAL – CeeDee Lamb 44-yard pass from Dak Prescott (Brandon Aubrey kick), 0:21. Cowboys 17–7. **Drive: 4 plays, 75 yards, 0:28.**

**Third quarter**

- IND – Spencer Shrader 47-yard field goal, 6:12. Cowboys 17–10. **Drive: 11 plays, 29 yards, 5:12.**
- DAL – Brandon Aubrey 28-yard field goal, 2:10. Cowboys 20–10. **Drive: 10 plays, 60 yards, 4:02.**
- IND – Ashton Dulin 55-yard pass from Daniel Jones (Spencer Shrader kick), 1:17. Cowboys 20–17. **Drive: 2 plays, 60 yards, 0:53.**

**Fourth quarter**

- IND – Spencer Shrader 59-yard field goal, 5:56. Tied 20–20. **Drive: 5 plays, 42 yards, 1:47.**
- IND – Spencer Shrader 50-yard field goal, 1:37. Colts 23–20. **Drive: 8 plays, 28 yards, 1:53.**
- DAL – Javonte Williams 1-yard run (Brandon Aubrey kick), 1:08. Cowboys 27–23. **Drive: 4 plays, 65 yards, 0:29.**

**Top passers**

- DAL – Dak Prescott – 21/34, 335 yards, 2 TD
- IND – Daniel Jones – 20/34, 180 yards, TD, INT

**Top rushers**

- DAL – Javonte Williams – 20 rushes, 101 yards, TD
- IND – Jonathan Taylor – 13 rushes, 46 yards

**Top receivers**

- DAL – CeeDee Lamb – 10 receptions, 195 yards, TD
- IND – Ashton Dulin – 1 receptions, 55 yards, TD

==== Week 10: vs. San Francisco 49ers ====
Week 10: San Francisco 49ers at Dallas Cowboys – Game summary

Quarter	1	2	3	4	Total
**49ers**	7	10	14	15	**46**
Cowboys	10	6	3	21	**40**

at AT&T Stadium, Arlington, Texas

- Date: November 15
- Game time: 3:25 p.m. CST
- Game weather: None (retractable roof closed)
- Game attendance: 90,763
- Referee: John Hussey
- TV announcers (Fox): Kevin Burkhardt, Tom Brady, Erin Andrews and Tom Rinaldi
- Recap, Game Book

Game information

**First quarter**

- DAL – Brandon Aubrey 52-yard field goal, 12:11. Cowboys 3–0. **Drive: 8 plays, 35 yards, 2:49.**
- SF – Deebo Samuel 11-yard pass from Brock Purdy (Eddy Pineiro kick), 6:56. 49ers 7–3. **Drive: 8 plays, 78 yards, 5:15.**
- DAL – George Pickens 35-yard pass from Dak Prescott (Brandon Aubrey kick), 1:08. Cowboys 10–7. **Drive: 11 plays, 71 yards, 5:48.**

**Second quarter**

- SF – Eddy Pineiro 28-yard field goal, 6:54. Tied 10–10. **Drive: 14 plays, 61 yards, 7:45.**
- DAL – George Pickens 39-yard pass from Dak Prescott (kick failed), 4:08. Cowboys 16–10. **Drive: 7 plays, 61 yards, 2:46.**
- SF – Christian McCaffrey 74-yard pass from Brock Purdy (Eddy Pineiro kick), 2:26. 49ers 17–16. **Drive: 3 plays, 76 yards, 1:42.**

**Third quarter**

- SF – Kaelon Black 25-yard run (Eddy Pineiro kick), 12:10. 49ers 24–16. **Drive: 5 plays, 81 yards, 2:50.**
- DAL – Brandon Aubrey 52-yard field goal, 8:36. 49ers 24–19. **Drive: 7 plays, 38 yards, 3:34.**
- SF – Deebo Samuel 70-yard run (Eddy Pineiro kick), 6:59. 49ers 31–19. **Drive: 3 plays, 80 yards, 1:37.**

**Fourth quarter**

- SF – Christian McCaffrey 16-yard run (Eddy Pineiro kick), 11:26. 49ers 38–19. **Drive: 12 plays, 90 yards, 7:10.**
- DAL – George Pickens 5-yard pass from Dak Prescott (pass failed), 9:08. 49ers 38–25. **Drive: 6 plays, 65 yards, 2:18.**
- DAL – Ryan Flournoy 11-yard pass from Dak Prescott (Brandon Aubrey kick), 3:42. 49ers 38–32. **Drive: 10 plays, 66 yards, 3:00.**
- SF – Christian McCaffrey 66-yard pass from Brock Purdy (Brock Purdy-Christian McCaffrey pass), 3:23. 49ers 46–32. **Drive: 2 plays, 66 yards, 0:19.**
- DAL – CeeDee Lamb 1-yard pass from Dak Prescott (Dak Prescott run), 0:43. 49ers 46–40. **Drive: 12 plays, 76 yards, 2:40.**

**Top passers**

- SF – Brock Purdy – 22/28, 389 yards, 3 TD
- DAL – Dak Prescott – 30/51, 343 yards, 5 TD, INT

**Top rushers**

- SF – Deebo Samuel – 3 rushes, 78 yards, TD
- DAL – Javonte Williams – 16 rushes, 63 yards

**Top receivers**

- SF – Christian McCaffrey – 4 receptions, 161 yards, 2 TD
- DAL – George Pickens – 11 receptions, 145 yards, 3 TD

The Cowboys defense gave up 584 total yards, which was the most they have ever given up at home. They trailed 19–31 through three quarters and even though they outscored the 49ers 21–8 in the fourth, that was not enough to recover.

==== Week 11: vs. Tennessee Titans ====
Week 11: Tennessee Titans at Dallas Cowboys – Game summary

Quarter	1	2	3	4	Total
Titans	3	6	14	7	**30**
**Cowboys**	13	14	14	10	**51**

at AT&T Stadium, Arlington, Texas

- Date: November 22
- Game time: 12:00 p.m. CST
- Game weather: None (retractable roof closed)
- Game attendance: 92,367
- Referee: Clete Blakeman
- TV announcers (Fox): Joe Davis, Greg Olsen, and Pam Oliver
- Recap, Game Book

Game information

**First quarter**

- DAL – Javonte Williams 1-yard rush (pass failed), 8:23. Cowboys 6–0. **Drive: 14 plays, 73 yards, 6:37.**
- TEN – Joey Slye 38-yard field goal, 4:56. Cowboys 6–3. **Drive: 9 plays, 45 yards, 3:27.**
- DAL – KaVontae Turpin 22-yard rush (Brandon Aubrey kick), 1:35. Cowboys 13–3. **Drive: 6 plays, 74 yards, 3:21.**

**Second quarter**

- DAL – CeeDee Lamb 8-yard pass from Dak Prescott (Brandon Aubrey kick), 12:59. Cowboys 20–3. **Drive: 5 plays, 56 yards, 1:48.**
- TEN – Joey Slye 48-yard field goal, 10:34. Cowboys 20–6. **Drive: 6 plays, 18 yards, 2:25.**
- DAL – George Pickens 11-yard pass from Dak Prescott (Brandon Aubrey kick), 8:58. Cowboys 27–6. **Drive: 5 plays, 56 yards, 1:48.**
- TEN – Joey Slye 28-yard field goal, 0:00. Cowboys 27–9. **Drive: 12 plays, 63 yards, 4:08.**

**Third quarter**

- TEN – Cam Ward 1-yard rush (Joey Slye kick), 13:08. Cowboys 27–16. **Drive: 4 plays, 71 yards, 1:52.**
- DAL – Javonte Williams 11-yard pass from Dak Prescott (Brandon Aubrey kick), 8:58. Cowboys 34–16. **Drive: 7 plays, 71 yards, 4:10.**
- TEN – Carnell Tate 59-yard pass from Cam Ward (Joey Slye kick), 7:19. Cowboys 34–23. **Drive: 2 plays, 68 yards, 1:39.**
- DAL – Dak Prescott 2-yard rush (Brandon Aubrey kick), 4:17. Cowboys 41–23. **Drive: 6 plays, 74 yards, 3:02.**

**Fourth quarter**

- DAL – Brandon Aubrey 49-yard field goal, 11:33. Cowboys 44–23. **Drive: 11 plays, 60 yards, 5:30.**
- DAL – Brevyn Spann-Ford 2-yard pass from Dak Prescott (Brandon Aubrey kick), 4:59. Cowboys 51–23. **Drive: 3 plays, 15 yards, 1:29.**
- TEN – Calvin Ridley 12-yard pass from Cam Ward (Joey Slye kick), 0:31. Cowboys 51–30. **Drive: 12 plays, 72 yards, 4:28.**

**Top passers**

- TEN – Cam Ward – 21/30, 248 yards, 2 TD
- DAL – Dak Prescott – 28/33, 325 yards, 4 TD

**Top rushers**

- TEN – Tony Pollard – 21 rushes, 110 yards
- DAL – Javonte Williams – 18 rushes, 67 yards, TD

**Top receivers**

- TEN – Chimere Dike – 6 receptions, 69 yards
- DAL – CeeDee Lamb – 11 receptions, 132 yards, TD

==== Week 12: vs. Philadelphia Eagles ====
Thanksgiving Day games

Week 12: Philadelphia Eagles at Dallas Cowboys – Game summary

Quarter	1	2	3	4	Total
Eagles	0	0	0	0	**0**
Cowboys	0	0	0	0	**0**

at AT&T Stadium, Arlington, Texas

- Date: November 26
- Game time: 3:30 p.m. CST
- Game weather: TBD (retractable roof stadium)
- TV announcers (Fox): Kevin Burkhardt, Tom Brady, Erin Andrews and Tom Rinaldi
- Preview

=== Standings ===
==== Division ====
NFC East
	W	L	T	PCT	DIV	CONF	PF	PA	STK
New York Giants	5	3	1	.611	2–1–1	3–3–1	203	196	L1
Dallas Cowboys	5	6	0	.455	2–1	2–5	337	312	W1
Washington Commanders	3	5	1	.389	2–2–1	3–4–1	196	223	W1
Philadelphia Eagles	3	7	0	.300	1–3	1–6	167	237	W1

==== Conference ====
NFC
Seed	Team	Division	W	L	T	PCT	DIV	CONF	SOS	SOV	STK
**Division leaders**
1	San Francisco 49ers	West	8	1	0	.889	3–0	5–1	.428	.444	W2
2 (Note: Detroit wins tie break over Chicago based on division record.)	Detroit Lions	North	8	2	0	.800	2–0	5–1	.440	.375	W6
3	New York Giants	East	5	3	1	.611	2–1–1	3–3–1	.356	.308	L1
4	Carolina Panthers	South	5	5	0	.500	2–1	4–3	.510	.412	W2
**Wild cards**
5	Chicago Bears	North	8	2	0	.800	0–2	6–2	.434	.375	W5
6	Minnesota Vikings	North	7	2	0	.778	3–1	5–1	.516	.423	W1
7 (Note: Green Bay wins tie break over Seattle based on conference record. Division tie break was initially used to eliminate LA Rams (see below).)	Green Bay Packers	North	6	4	0	.600	1–3	4–4	.535	.459	L1
**In the hunt**
8 (Note: Seattle wins tie break over LA Rams based on division record.)	Seattle Seahawks	West	6	4	0	.600	2–1	2–3	.515	.393	W2
9	Los Angeles Rams	West	6	4	0	.600	1–2	4–2	.485	.345	W4
10	Dallas Cowboys	East	5	6	0	.455	2–1	2–5	.400	.290	W1
11	Washington Commanders	East	3	5	1	.389	2–2–1	3–4–1	.506	.500	W1
12 (Note: Tampa Bay wins tie break over Philadelphia based on conference record. Division tie break was initially to eliminate Atlanta and New Orleans (see below).) (Note: Tampa Bay wins tie break over Atlanta and New Orleans based on head-to-head record.)	Tampa Bay Buccaneers	South	3	7	0	.300	2–0	3–4	.616	.419	L2
13 (Note: Atlanta wins tie break over Philadephia based on conference record. Division tie break was initially to eliminate New Orleans (see below).) (Note: Atlanta wins tie break over New Orleans based on head-to-head victory.)	Atlanta Falcons	South	3	7	0	.300	1–2	3–3	.586	.586	L3
14 (Note: New Orleans wins tie break over Philadelphia based on conference record.)	New Orleans Saints	South	3	7	0	.300	0–2	1–5	.571	.517	L2
15	Philadelphia Eagles	East	3	7	0	.300	1–3	1–6	.521	.362	W1
16	Arizona Cardinals	West	3	8	0	.273	1–4	2–6	.621	.400	L3
