= Diego Pavia =

American football player (born 2002)

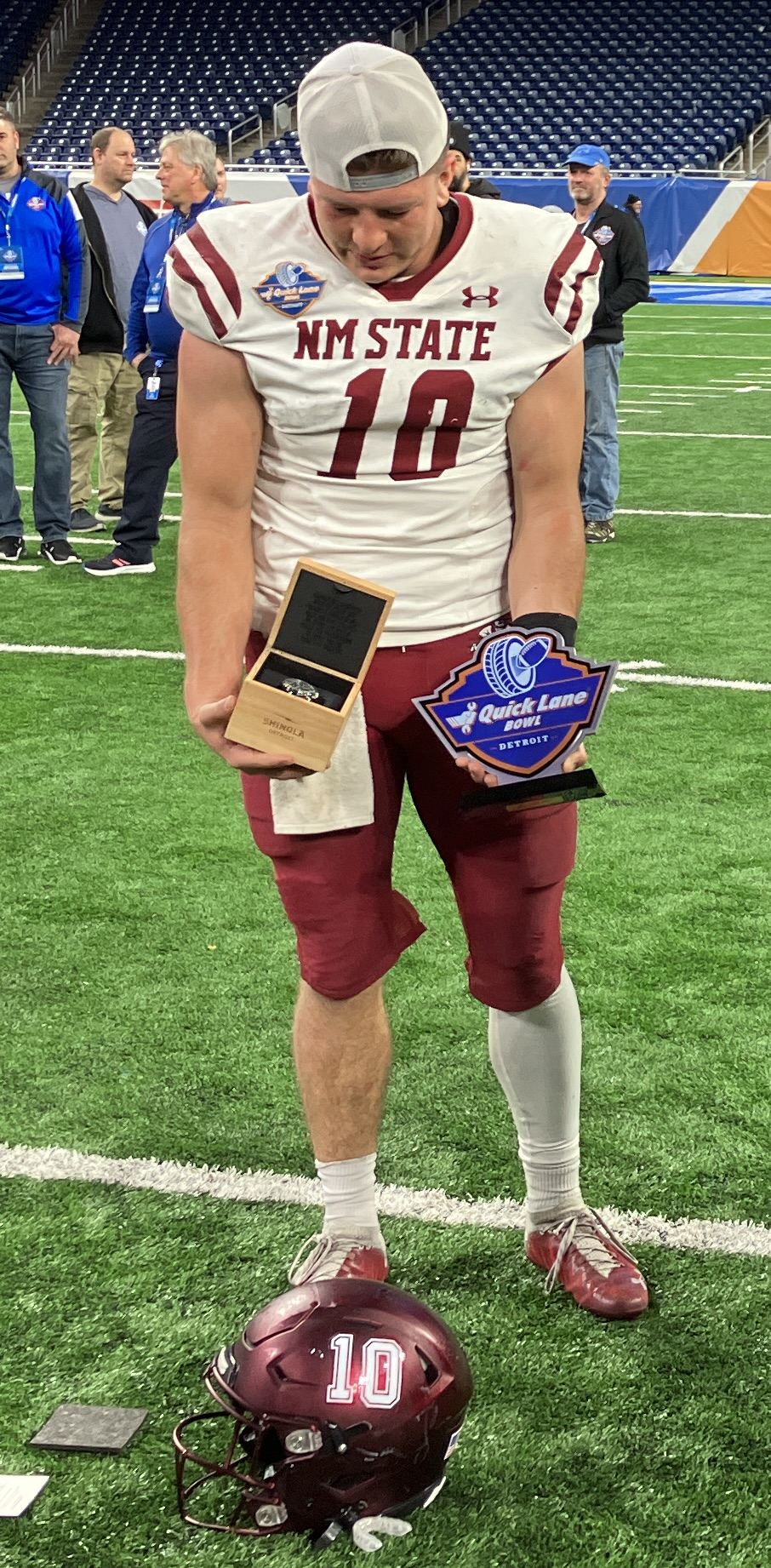
- Pavia after the 2022 Quick Lane Bowl

Columbus Aviators
- Position: Quarterback
- Roster status: Active

Personal information
- Born: February 16, 2002 (age 24); Albuquerque, New Mexico, U.S.
- Listed height: 5 ft 10 in (1.78 m)
- Listed weight: 207 lb (94 kg)

Career information
- High school: Volcano Vista (Albuquerque)
- College: NMMI (2020–2021); New Mexico State (2022–2023); Vanderbilt (2024–2025)
- NFL draft: 2026: undrafted

Career history
- Baltimore Ravens (2026)*; Columbus Aviators (2027–present)
- * Offseason or practice squad member only

Awards and highlights
- NJCAA Division I national champion (2021); Johnny Unitas Golden Arm Award (2025); SN College Football Player of the Year (2025); SEC Offensive Player of the Year (2025); CUSA Offensive Player of the Year (2023); SEC Newcomer of the Year (2024); First-team All-SEC (2025); Second-team All-SEC (2024); Second-team All-CUSA (2023)
- Stats at Pro Football Reference

Diego Pavia (born February 16, 2002) is an American professional football quarterback for the Columbus Aviators of the United Football League (UFL). He began his college football career with the New Mexico Military Broncos, winning the 2021 NJCAA National Football Championship, and spent his next two seasons with the New Mexico State Aggies, where he was named the 2023 CUSA Offensive Player of the Year. Pavia played his final two seasons for the Vanderbilt Commodores, winning the Johnny Unitas Golden Arm Award, SN College Football Player of the Year, and SEC Offensive Player of the Year in 2025.

== Early life ==
Pavia was born on February 16, 2002, in Albuquerque, New Mexico. He was raised in a single-parent household by his mother, Antoinette Padilla, who worked as a nurse. Pavia attended Volcano Vista High School in Albuquerque, where he was a three-sport athlete, playing football, baseball, and wrestling, the latter of which he won a state championship in. Despite being offered a partial college wrestling scholarship from Nebraska, he opted to pursue football. In his senior season of football, Pavia led Volcano Vista to an 11–0 record, completing 108 of 165 pass attempts for 1,485 yards and 14 touchdowns to five interceptions. He also rushed for 464 yards and nine touchdowns.

Pavia received no scholarship offers from any NCAA Division I school and only two Division II schools—Western Colorado and Western New Mexico—offered him a chance to play quarterback. In a 2024 ESPN story, Pavia recalled, "I just think they were scared of my height. People like to focus on height, weight and 40-yard dash times. I like to go off film. I move well. I feel like I throw the ball well. I feel like I run well. I just don't have God-given height and weight." He committed to play JUCO football at New Mexico Military Institute (NMMI).

== College career ==
=== New Mexico Military Institute ===
In Pavia's career at NMMI, he completed 189 of his 323 passing attempts for 2,644 yards and 31 touchdowns to just four interceptions. He also rushed for 1,107 yards and 15 touchdowns. In 2021, Pavia's last season at NMMI, he led the Broncos to the NJCAA National Football Championship. He threw for 21 touchdowns in the championship season while being intercepted only once, and threw for two touchdowns and ran for one in the Broncos' 31–13 championship game win against Iowa Western.

Going into the championship game, New Mexico State University head coach Jerry Kill and offensive coordinator Tim Beck had decided to offer a scholarship to Iowa Western quarterback Nate Glantz. They had even called Iowa Western's head coach before the game to tell him that they planned to make their offer on the day after the game, and then went to a local Hooters to watch the game. According to CBS Sports journalist Dennis Dodd, "Besides greasy fingers from the wings, they also came out transformed. The quarterback for the winning team that day, New Mexico Military Institute, changed their minds." In Dodd's story, Beck recalled, "As we're watching the game and we're looking at each other ... we say, 'We're recruiting the wrong guy.'" Kill and Beck then told Iowa Western's coach that they were no longer interested in Glantz, who went on to play at FCS Lindenwood.

=== New Mexico State ===
Pavia committed to play college football at New Mexico State for the 2022 season. He got his first start with the Aggies on August 28, in the team's season opener against Nevada, and struggled mightily, turning the ball over four times in the first half before being benched, as the Aggies lost 23–12. He got his next start two weeks later against UTEP, and had a chance to tie the game at UTEP's 13 yard line, but was strip-sacked with three seconds left to end the game with another loss. Pavia had a career night on November 26 against Liberty. The Aggies entered as 24.5 point underdogs, but Pavia completed 16 of 21 passes for 214 yards and three touchdowns, and ran for an additional 125 yards and three more TDs, as the Aggies pulled off a shocking victory. For his performance against Liberty, Pavia was named the Manning Quarterback of the Week. In the season finale against Valparaiso, Pavia went nine for 13 on his passing attempts for 323 yards and four touchdowns, with one additional rushing touchdown, before leaving the game in the second quarter with a hamstring injury. New Mexico State won the game 65–3, becoming bowl eligible for the first time since 2017. In the 2022 Quick Lane Bowl against Bowling Green, Pavia completed 17 of 29 passing attempts for 167 yards and two touchdowns to just one interception, and also rushed for 65 yards. Pavia recovered his own fumble late in the fourth quarter to give the Aggies a first down and clinch the 24–19 win, earning Quick Lane Bowl MVP honors. Pavia finished the season completing 101 of 190 pass attempts for 1,450 yards and 13 touchdowns to six interceptions. He also rushed for 508 yards and six touchdowns. For his performance on the year, he was named All-Independent first team by College Football Network.

The following season, 2023, Pavia built on his performance of his first year at NMSU. Of particular note was a November 18 victory at Auburn, as he delivered a standout performance in New Mexico State’s 31–10 road upset, throwing for 201 yards and three touchdowns, adding 35 rushing yards, and even recording a body slam tackle after an interception to prevent a long return. His poise, versatility, and physical style of play against the SEC opponent were widely praised, marking one of the signature victories of his collegiate career.

On December 23, 2023, Pavia announced that he would enter the transfer portal. Meanwhile, he returned to NMSU for the spring semester to graduate. During a visit to Nevada, Pavia verbally committed to play for the Wolf Pack, and called Beck to let him know. A few minutes later, with Pavia still on the campus, Kill called to tell Pavia that he would be joining the Vanderbilt staff, and that he expected to see Pavia there.

=== Vanderbilt ===
==== 2024 ====
On January 18, 2024, Pavia announced that he would transfer to Vanderbilt, following Kill there. He was also joined by offensive coordinator Tim Beck and teammate Eli Stowers. Upon arriving at Vanderbilt, he entered a quarterback position battle with Nate Johnson, a transfer from Utah. At the end of fall camp, Pavia was named the starting quarterback for the home opener against Virginia Tech. Drew Dickey was named his backup, as Johnson fell to third-string. On August 31, Vanderbilt opened the season at home as underdogs against Virginia Tech. Shockingly, Vanderbilt jumped out to a 17–0 lead in the first half, with Pavia throwing a touchdown to Quincy Skinner Jr. Virginia Tech managed a comeback, however, and the Commodores found themselves trailing 27–20 late in the fourth quarter. Pavia managed to tie the game in the final minutes with a touchdown pass to Sedrick Alexander, forcing overtime. In the first overtime period, Pavia ran in the winning touchdown, as Vanderbilt came away with an upset 34–27 victory. Pavia finished the game 12-of-16 for 190 yards and two touchdowns while rushing for another 104 yards and a touchdown. On September 7, Pavia went 10-of-13 for 83 yards while rushing for another 51 yards and a touchdown as Vanderbilt blew out Alcorn State 55–0.

After starting 2–0, Pavia and the Commodores began to struggle. On September 14, Vanderbilt played at Georgia State, and found themselves trailing 22–10 in the fourth quarter, their only touchdown coming on a Pavia pass to Junior Sherrill. The Commodores scored 22 points in the fourth quarter in a late rally, including Pavia's touchdown pass to Eli Stowers, but a late Georgia State touchdown on busted coverage sealed a 36–32 win for the Panthers. In the loss, Pavia went 18-of-33 for 270 yards and two touchdowns with 40 rushing yards, but it wasn't enough to complete the comeback. On September 21, the Commodores went on the road yet again to face No. 7 Missouri as massive underdogs. Pavia opened the scoring with a 65-yard touchdown pass to Joseph McVay in the first quarter, putting Missouri on potential upset alert. Missouri managed to rally in the second half, forcing Pavia to lead a game-tying drive in the third quarter. Heading into overtime at 20–20, Pavia threw a touchdown to Gabe Fisher to take a 27–20 lead. Missouri answered and Brock Taylor missed a field goal in double overtime to seal a 30–27 loss. Pavia finished the game 14-of-23 for 178 yards and two touchdowns, adding 84 yards rushing.

On October 5, Pavia led Vanderbilt to an upset victory over No. 1 Alabama, Vanderbilt's first win over a top-5 team in program history. In the game, he went 16-of-20 for 252 yards and two touchdowns while running for 56 yards.

In November 2024, Pavia filed a lawsuit against the NCAA alleging that NCAA NIL policies for redshirts and Juco years violated the Sherman Antitrust Act.

==== 2025 ====
On October 18, 2025, No. 17 Vanderbilt hosted No. 10 LSU in FirstBank Stadium. On Vanderbilt's opening drive, Pavia scored a rushing touchdown to put the Commodores up 7–3. After LSU took the lead, Pavia led another drive capped off by a Sedrick Alexander rushing touchdown, putting Vanderbilt up 14–10. The Commodores were up 17–13 at halftime. In the second half, Pavia found Cole Spence wide open in the end zone for a passing touchdown to extend the lead. Although LSU attempted to rally late, Pavia scored on a 21-yard rushing touchdown to seal the victory as Vanderbilt won 31–24. Pavia finished the game 14-of-22 for 160 yards and a touchdown with 86 rushing yards and two rushing touchdowns. After Pavia's final touchdown, he struck the Heisman Trophy pose in victory. Pavia was named SEC Co-Offensive Player of the Week along with Georgia quarterback Gunner Stockton.

On November 1, No. 9 Vanderbilt traveled to Darrell K Royal–Texas Memorial Stadium to face No. 20 Texas. Texas jumped off to an early 17–0 lead, aided by a Pavia fumble. Before halftime, Pavia found Eli Stowers for a 18-yard touchdown pass to cut the deficit to 24–10. However, Vanderbilt's situation only worsened as they trailed 34–10 at the end of the third quarter. In the fourth quarter, Pavia scored on a 25-yard rushing touchdown, found Stowers again for a 67-yard passing touchdown with a successful two-point conversion pass to Junior Sherrill, and finally found Richie Hoskins for an 8-yard passing touchdowns. After a failed onside attempt, the comeback fell just short in a 34–31 loss. Pavia finished the game 27-of-38 for 365 passing yards, a career-high, and three passing touchdowns with 43 rushing yards and a rushing touchdown.

On November 8, No. 16 Vanderbilt hosted Auburn in FirstBank Stadium. Despite being favored, Vanderbilt found themselves trailing 17–3 in the second quarter. Pavia found Junior Sherrill late in the half for a 20-yard passing touchdown as the Commodores trailed 20–10 at halftime. In the third quarter, Pavia led a drive downfield to cut the deficit to 20–17, capped off by a 4-yard rushing touchdown from Sedrick Alexander. Pavia then found Tre Richardson for a 57-yard touchdown pass to take a 24–23 lead. However, Auburn took the lead back and Vanderbilt trailed 30–24 at the end of the third quarter. Diego Pavia scored on a 7-yard rushing touchdown early in the fourth quarter to take a 31–30 lead, which was later extended to 38–30 on a 9-yard rushing touchdown by Sedrick Alexander. However, Auburn tied up the game late. With a chance at a game-winning drive, Pavia was stuffed on a designed quarterback run for a turnover on downs and the game went into overtime. In overtime, Pavia found Cole Spence for a 4-yard touchdown on a jump pass as Vanderbilt won 45–38. Pavia finished the game 25-of-33 for 377 passing yards, setting a new career-high once again, and 3 passing touchdowns with 112 rushing yards and a rushing touchdown. For his performance, Pavia was named the SEC Offensive Player of the Week and the AP Player of the Week.

On November 22, No. 14 Vanderbilt hosted Kentucky in FirstBank Stadium in a blowout 45–17 victory. Pavia finished the game 33-of-39 for 484 passing yards, another new career-high, and five passing touchdowns with one interception. He also had 48 rushing yards with a rushing touchdown. Pavia broke the Vanderbilt record for single-game passing yards, breaking the prior record of 461 yards set by Whit Taylor in 1981. Pavia received a standing ovation from the crowd after he left the field in the fourth quarter. Pavia was named the SEC Offensive Player of the Week for the third time in the season.

On November 29, No. 14 Vanderbilt traveled to Neyland Stadium to face No. 19 Tennessee. Pavia struggled early, throwing two interceptions in the first half as Vanderbilt trailed 21–14. In the final moments of the first half, Pavia found Tre Richardson for a 6-yard touchdown pass to tie the game. In the third quarter, Pavia led a touchdown drive and a field goal drive as the Commodores led 31–21 at the end of the third quarter. In the fourth quarter, Pavia scored on a 24-yard rushing touchdown to extend the lead and another touchdown drive sealed a dominant 45–24 victory. Pavia finished the game 18-of-28 for 268 passing yards, a touchdown, and two interceptions with a career-high 165 rushing yards and a rushing touchdown. This secured the first 10-win season in Vanderbilt history and Vanderbilt's first win over Tennessee since 2018. Pavia was named the AP Player of the Week for the second time in the season. He became the first player in SEC history to have four consecutive games with over 400 yards of total offense.

Pavia received various accolades for his 2025 season. He was named quarterback for the All-SEC first team. He won the 2025 Johnny Unitas Golden Arm Award and was named a finalist for the Heisman Trophy, becoming the first ever Vanderbilt player to receive either honor. Pavia was also a finalist for the 2025 Manning Award.

He finished runner-up in the Heisman voting to Indiana quarterback Fernando Mendoza. Following the vote, Pavia posted a photo to social media with the caption "F—- all the voters but…..family for life." He also attended a nightclub party where he gestured toward a sign that read "Fuck Indiana". Pavia subsequently apologized, writing on X that he had "much love and respect for the Heisman voters" while calling Mendoza "an elite competitor and a deserving winner of the award."

=== College statistics ===
Season	Team	Games			Passing								Rushing			
Season	Team	GP	GS	Record	Cmp	Att	Pct	Yds	Avg	TD	Int	Rtg	Att	Yds	Avg	TD
2020	New Mexico Military	8	8	4–4	68	113	60.2	916	8.1	10	3	152.2	86	449	5.2	8
2021	New Mexico Military	13	13	12–1	121	215	56.3	1,728	8.0	21	1	155.1	110	658	6.0	7
2022	New Mexico State	12	8	4–4	101	190	53.2	1,450	7.6	13	6	133.5	93	508	5.5	6
2023	New Mexico State	15	15	10–5	221	366	60.4	2,973	8.1	26	9	147.1	176	923	5.2	7
2024	Vanderbilt	13	13	7–6	177	298	59.4	2,293	7.7	20	4	143.5	193	800	4.1	8
2025	Vanderbilt	13	13	10–3	267	378	70.6	3,539	9.4	29	8	170.4	167	862	5.2	10
SWJCFC career		21	21	16–5	189	328	57.6	2,644	8.1	31	4	154.1	196	1,107	5.6	15
FBS career		53	49	31–18	766	1,232	62.2	10,255	8.3	88	27	151.3	628	3,094	4.9	31

== Professional career ==
Pre-draft measurables
Height	Weight	Arm length	Hand span	Wingspan	40-yard dash	10-yard split	20-yard split	20-yard shuttle
5 ft 10 1/8 in (1.78 m)	207 lb (94 kg)	28 5/8 in (0.73 m)	9 5/8 in (0.24 m)	6 ft 1 1/2 in (1.87 m)	4.84 s	1.65 s	2.73 s	4.38 s
All values from NFL Combine/Pro Day

Pavia went unselected in the 2026 NFL draft, becoming the first Heisman finalist since Jordan Lynch in 2014 to go undrafted. His failure to sign with a team in the first day of undrafted free agency was the first time a Heisman finalist quarterback had failed to do so since 2004 winner Jason White went undrafted and unsigned.

=== Baltimore Ravens ===
On April 26, 2026, Pavia accepted the Baltimore Ravens' invitation to attend their rookie minicamp. On April 28, the Ravens signed Pavia to a three-year contract. Pavia was waived by the Ravens on July 23, to make room for Ethan Pocic on the team's 90–man roster.

Pavia was placed on the negotiation list of the Winnipeg Blue Bombers in June 2024, before his graduation, giving the team exclusive rights to Pavia should he seek to sign with the Canadian Football League. Pavia's agent had preliminary discussions with the Blue Bombers in April 2026.

=== Colombus Aviators ===
In October 2026, Pavia stated that he was in negotiations to sign with the United Football League, with the blessing of UFL controlling owner Mike Repole.

In November 2026, Pavia was subsequently first overall in the 2027 UFL Draft by the Columbus Aviators.
