= Johnny Unitas Golden Arm Award =

American college football award

- Awarded for: Top upperclassman quarterback in college football
- Location: Baltimore, Maryland
- Country: United States
- Presented by: Golden Arm Foundation

History
- First award: Established in 1987
- Most recent: Diego Pavia, Vanderbilt
- Website: www.goldenarmfoundation.com

The Johnny Unitas Golden Arm Award is given annually in the United States to the nation's top upperclassman quarterback in college football. Candidates are judged on accomplishments on the field as well as on their character, scholastic achievement, and leadership qualities. The award was established in 1987 and named after Johnny Unitas, who was nicknamed "The Golden Arm". Unitas played his college career at the University of Louisville and set many records in the National Football League while playing for the Baltimore Colts.

== Winners ==
These are the award recipients since inception in 1987.

Year	Player	School	Refs
1987	Don McPherson	Syracuse	
1988	Rodney Peete	USC	
1989	Tony Rice	Notre Dame	
1990	Craig Erickson	Miami (FL)	
1991	Casey Weldon	Florida State	
1992	Gino Torretta	Miami (FL) (2)	
1993	Charlie Ward	Florida State (2)	
1994	Jay Barker	Alabama	
1995	Tommie Frazier	Nebraska	
1996	Danny Wuerffel	Florida	
1997	Peyton Manning	Tennessee	
1998	Cade McNown	UCLA	
1999	Chris Redman	Louisville	
2000	Chris Weinke	Florida State (3)	
2001	David Carr	Fresno State	
2002	Carson Palmer	USC (2)	
2003	Eli Manning	Ole Miss	
2004	Jason White	Oklahoma	
2005	Matt Leinart	USC (3)	
2006	Brady Quinn	Notre Dame (2)	
2007	Matt Ryan	Boston College	
2008	Graham Harrell	Texas Tech	
2009	Colt McCoy	Texas	
2010	Scott Tolzien	Wisconsin	
2011	Andrew Luck	Stanford	
2012	Collin Klein	Kansas State	
2013	A. J. McCarron	Alabama (2)	
2014	Marcus Mariota	Oregon	
2015	Connor Cook	Michigan State	
2016	Deshaun Watson	Clemson	
2017	Mason Rudolph	Oklahoma State	
2018	Gardner Minshew	Washington State	
2019	Joe Burrow	LSU	
2020	Mac Jones	Alabama (3)	
2021	Kenny Pickett	Pittsburgh	
2022	Max Duggan	TCU	
2023	Jayden Daniels	LSU (2)	
2024	Shedeur Sanders	Colorado	
2025	Diego Pavia	Vanderbilt	
