= The Sporting News College Football Player of the Year =

American college football award

- Awarded for: top collegiate football player
- Country: United States
- Presented by: The Sporting News

History
- First award: 1942
- Most recent: Vanderbilt quarterback Diego Pavia

The Sporting News College Football Player of the Year award is given to the player of the year in college football as adjudged by The Sporting News (formerly known as Sporting News from 2002 to 2022).

== Winners ==
Year	Winner	Position	School	Source
1942	Frank Sinkwich	Halfback	Georgia	
1943	Angelo Bertelli	Quarterback	Notre Dame	
1944	Les Horvath	Halfback	Ohio State	
1945	Doc Blanchard	Fullback	Army	
1946	Glenn Davis	Halfback	Army (2)	
1947	Johnny Lujack	Quarterback	Notre Dame (2)	
1948	Doak Walker	Halfback	SMU	
1949	Leon Hart	End	Notre Dame (3)	
1950	Vic Janowicz	Halfback	Ohio State (2)	
1951	Dick Kazmaier	Halfback	Princeton	
1952	Billy Vessels	Halfback	Oklahoma	
1953	Johnny Lattner	Halfback	Notre Dame (4)	
1954	Howard Cassady	Halfback	Ohio State (3)	
1955	Howard Cassady (2)	Halfback	Ohio State (4)	
1956	Tommy McDonald	Halfback	Oklahoma (2)	
1957	John David Crow	Halfback	Texas A&M	
1958	Billy Cannon	Halfback	LSU	
1959	Billy Cannon (2)	Halfback	LSU (2)	
1960	Joe Bellino	Halfback	Navy	
1961	Bob Ferguson	Fullback	Ohio State (5)	
1962	Terry Baker	Quarterback	Oregon State	
1963	Roger Staubach	Quarterback	Navy (2)	
1964	Dick Butkus	Center / linebacker	Illinois	
1965	Donny Anderson	Running back	Texas Tech	
1965	Jim Grabowski	Halfback	Illinois (2)	
1966	Steve Spurrier	Quarterback	Florida	
1967	Gary Beban	Quarterback	UCLA	
1968	O. J. Simpson	Running back	USC	
1969	Steve Owens	Running back	Oklahoma (3)	
1970	Jim Plunkett	Quarterback	Stanford	
1971	Ed Marinaro	Running back	Cornell	
1971	Pat Sullivan	Quarterback	Auburn	
1972	Bert Jones	Quarterback	LSU (3)	
1973	John Hicks	Guard	Ohio State (6)	
1974	Archie Griffin	Running back	Ohio State (7)	
1975	Archie Griffin (2)	Running back	Ohio State (8)	
1976	Tony Dorsett	Running back	Pittsburgh	
1977	Earl Campbell	Running back	Texas	
1978	Billy Sims	Running back	Oklahoma (4)	
1979	Charles White	Running back	USC (2)	
1980	Hugh Green	Linebacker	Pittsburgh (2)	
1981	Marcus Allen	Running back	USC (3)	
1982	Herschel Walker	Running back	Georgia (2)	
1983	Mike Rozier	Running back	Nebraska	
1984	Doug Flutie	Quarterback	Boston College	
1985	Bo Jackson	Running back	Auburn (2)	
1986	Vinny Testaverde	Quarterback	Miami (FL)	
1987	Tim Brown	Wide receiver	Notre Dame (5)	
1988	Barry Sanders	Running back	Oklahoma State	
1989	Darian Hagan	Quarterback	Colorado	
1990	Raghib Ismail	Wide receiver	Notre Dame (6)	
1991	Desmond Howard	Wide receiver	Michigan	
1992	Marvin Jones	Linebacker	Florida State	
1993	Charlie Ward	Quarterback	Florida State (2)	
1994	Rashaan Salaam	Running back	Colorado (2)	
1995	Tommie Frazier	Quarterback	Nebraska (2)	
1996	Danny Wuerffel	Quarterback	Florida (2)	
1997	Charles Woodson	Cornerback	Michigan (2)	
1998	Ricky Williams	Running back	Texas (2)	
1999	Ron Dayne	Running back	Wisconsin	
2000	Chris Weinke	Quarterback	Florida State (3)	
2001	Eric Crouch	Quarterback	Nebraska (3)	
2002	Carson Palmer	Quarterback	USC (4)	
2003	Jason White	Quarterback	Oklahoma (5)	
2004	Alex Smith	Quarterback	Utah	
2005	Reggie Bush	Running back	USC (5)	
2006	Troy Smith	Quarterback	Ohio State (9)	
2007	Tim Tebow	Quarterback	Florida (3)	
2008	Graham Harrell	Quarterback	Texas Tech (2)	
2008	Sam Bradford	Quarterback	Oklahoma (6)	
2008	Colt McCoy	Quarterback	Texas (3)	
2009	Mark Ingram II	Running back	Alabama	
2010	Cam Newton	Quarterback	Auburn (3)	
2011	Robert Griffin III	Quarterback	Baylor	
2012	Johnny Manziel	Quarterback	Texas A&M (2)	
2013	Jameis Winston	Quarterback	Florida State (4)	
2014	Marcus Mariota	Quarterback	Oregon	
2015	Baker Mayfield	Quarterback	Oklahoma (7)	
2016	Lamar Jackson	Quarterback	Louisville	
2017	Baker Mayfield (2)	Quarterback	Oklahoma (8)	
2018	Tua Tagovailoa	Quarterback	Alabama (2)	
2019	Joe Burrow	Quarterback	LSU (4)	
2020	DeVonta Smith	Wide receiver	Alabama (3)	
2021	Bryce Young	Quarterback	Alabama (4)	
2022	Caleb Williams	Quarterback	USC (6)	
2023	Jayden Daniels	Quarterback	LSU (5)	
2024	Travis Hunter	Cornerback / wide receiver	Colorado (3)	
2025	Diego Pavia	Quarterback	Vanderbilt	
