= Eli Stowers =

American football player (born 2003)

No. 87 – Philadelphia Eagles
- Position: Tight end
- Roster status: Active

Personal information
- Born: April 15, 2003 (age 23); Denton, Texas, U.S.
- Listed height: 6 ft 4 in (1.93 m)
- Listed weight: 239 lb (108 kg)

Career information
- High school: John H. Guyer (Denton, Texas)
- College: Texas A&M (2021–2022); New Mexico State (2023); Vanderbilt (2024–2025)
- NFL draft: 2026: 2nd round, 54th overall pick

Career history
- Philadelphia Eagles (2026–present)

Awards and highlights
- William V. Campbell Trophy (2025); John Mackey Award (2025); Unanimous All-American (2025); 2× first-team All-SEC (2024, 2025)

Career NFL statistics as of Week 8, 2026
- Receptions: 3
- Receiving yards: 53
- Stats at Pro Football Reference

Elijah Stowers (born April 15, 2003) is an American professional football tight end for the Philadelphia Eagles of the National Football League (NFL). He played college football for the Texas A&M Aggies, New Mexico State Aggies, and Vanderbilt Commodores, winning the 2025 John Mackey Award with Vanderbilt before being selected by the Eagles in the second round of the 2026 NFL draft.

== Early life ==
Stowers was born on April 15, 2003, and grew up in Little Elm, Texas. He attended John H. Guyer High School in Denton, Texas, where he played quarterback. As a junior in 2019, he was the District 5-6A Co-Offensive MVP after passing for 2,969 yards with 36 touchdowns while adding 1,166 rushing yards and 11 touchdowns. Stowers committed to Texas A&M University to play college football.

== College career ==
College recruiting
Name	Hometown	School	Height	Weight	Commit date
Eli Stowers; QB	Denton	Guyer	6 ft 4 in (1.93 m)	204 lb (93 kg)	Jul 2, 2019
Eli Stowers; QB	Recruit ratings: Rivals: 247Sports: ESPN: (82)				

Stowers played quarterback at Texas A&M in 2021 and 2022, appearing in five games as a backup. Prior to the 2023 season he transferred to New Mexico State University, where he played quarterback and tight end. Over 15 games he had 35 receptions for 366 yards with two touchdowns while adding 108 rushing yards, two rushing touchdowns and one passing touchdown. After the season, Stowers transferred to Vanderbilt University.

For the 2025 season, Stowers was named the winner of the John Mackey Award given to the nation's best tight end. He also was named the winner of the William V. Campbell Trophy which is awarded to the player who shows the most combined excellence in academics and football.

On December 28, 2025, it was confirmed Stowers would be opting out of the ReliaQuest Bowl which Vanderbilt was scheduled to play on December 31, against Iowa.

=== Statistics ===
Season	Team	Games		Passing								Rushing				Receiving			
Season	Team	GP	GS	Cmp	Att	Pct	Yds	Y/A	TD	Int	Rtg	Att	Yds	Avg	TD	Rec	Yds	Avg	TD
2021	Texas A&M	3	0	Did not record statistics															
2022	Texas A&M	2	0	Did not record statistics															
2023	New Mexico State	15	3	4	8	50.0	99	12.4	1	0	195.2	28	108	3.9	2	35	366	10.5	2
2024	Vanderbilt	13	5	1	2	50.0	17	8.5	1	0	286.4	6	7	1.2	0	49	638	13.0	5
2025	Vanderbilt	12	5	0	0	–	0	–	0	0	–	2	2	1.0	0	62	769	12.4	4
Career		45	13	5	10	50.0	116	11.6	2	0	213.4	36	117	3.3	2	146	1,773	12.1	11

== Professional career ==
Pre-draft measurables
Height	Weight	Arm length	Hand span	Wingspan	40-yard dash	10-yard split	20-yard split	Vertical jump	Broad jump
6 ft 3 3/4 in (1.92 m)	239 lb (108 kg)	32 5/8 in (0.83 m)	9 3/4 in (0.25 m)	6 ft 7 3/4 in (2.03 m)	4.51 s	1.59 s	2.62 s	45.5 in (1.16 m)	11 ft 3 in (3.43 m)
All values from NFL Combine

Stowers was selected by the Philadelphia Eagles in the second round with the 54th overall pick in the 2026 NFL draft. On September 12, 2026, Stowers was placed on injured reserve due to quadriceps and hamstring injuries.

== Personal life ==
Stowers' father, Donald, is a high school football coach and former football player who played at New Mexico State and in NFL Europe for the Rhein Fire. His sister, Kyndal, plays Volleyball for Texas A&M.
