= Jason White (American football) =

American college football player (born 1980)

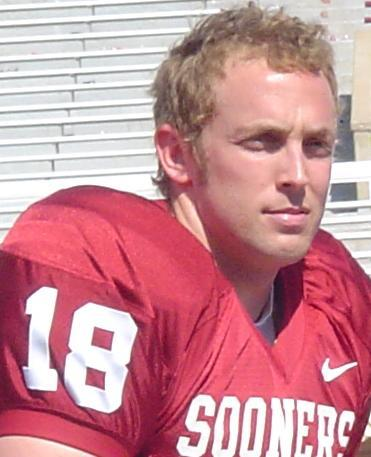
- White at Oklahoma

No. 18
- Position: Quarterback

Personal information
- Born: June 19, 1980 (age 46); Tuttle, Oklahoma, U.S.
- Listed height: 6 ft 2 in (1.88 m)
- Listed weight: 220 lb (100 kg)

Career information
- High school: Tuttle
- College: Oklahoma (1999–2004)
- NFL draft: 2005: undrafted

Career history
- Tennessee Titans (2005)*
- * Offseason or practice squad member only

Awards and highlights
- BCS national champion (2000); Heisman Trophy (2003); Unanimous All-American (2003); Third-team All-American (2004)

Jason White (born June 19, 1980) is an American former football quarterback. He played college football for the Oklahoma Sooners, winning the Heisman Trophy in 2003. Due to concerns over his history of knee injuries, White was not selected in the 2005 NFL draft. White signed with the Tennessee Titans as an undrafted free agent in 2005, but personal concerns over his past injuries led to him retiring before the start of the season. He is the only Heisman winner who pursued a professional football career to not play in the NFL.

== Early life ==
White was raised in Tuttle, Oklahoma. He attended Tuttle High School and played for the Tuttle Tigers high school football team. His parents owned a cement plant in east Tuttle.

== College career ==
White attended the University of Oklahoma, where he played for coach Bob Stoops's Oklahoma Sooners football team from 1999 to 2004. White played in a reserve role his true freshman season, behind Josh Heupel, the Sooners' starting quarterback. He redshirted his sophomore season in 2000; the Sooners went on to win the 2001 Orange Bowl and the BCS National Championship.

Nate Hybl beat out White for the starting quarterback job in 2001. Hybl hurt his right side in the first quarter of the Sooners' 14–3 win over #5 Texas and did not return. White replaced him and was 16-of-23 for 108 yards and ran 12 times for a team-high 38 yards. He started the next week against Kansas, throwing four touchdown passes to tight end Trent Smith. White continued to start the following games for the Sooners including a showdown with Nebraska, featuring the top two teams in the BCS for the second consecutive year. During the second quarter, White injured his ACL while completing a long pass to running back Quentin Griffin, ending his season.

The 2002 season started out with a preseason battle for the starting quarterback position between White and Hybl. White eventually won a close battle and was named the starter for the first game against Tulsa. After a slow start, the offense finally got rolling and they easily cruised to a shutout win. In the second game, the Alabama Crimson Tide came to Norman. White again went down with a knee injury, this time tearing the ACL in the opposite knee. Hybl came in as a backup and led the team to a hard-fought come-from-behind win, but the offense experienced some struggles in the second half. White would again be out for the season and Hybl led the team to a Big 12 championship and a victory over Washington State in the 2003 Rose Bowl game, being named MVP.

After suffering from consecutive anterior cruciate ligament tears, White had reconstructive knee surgeries on both knees during the 2001 and 2002 seasons. Despite the fact that White could not scramble and the Sooners had to run every offensive play out of a shotgun formation, White won the Heisman Trophy in 2003 after throwing 40 touchdown passes and 8 interceptions. White was also the recipient of the Associated Press Player of the Year, unanimous All-American, consensus Big 12 Offensive Player of the Year, the Davey O'Brien Award, and the Jim Thorpe Courage Award in his 2003 season. He was also the 2003 NCAA QB of the Year as awarded by the Touchdown Club of Columbus. He was awarded a medical hardship by the NCAA and allowed to play a second senior year in 2004. He led the Sooners to the Big 12 championship game in 2003, which they lost to Kansas State.

- 2004 BCS National Championship Game – Oklahoma 14, LSU 21

White was granted a medical hardship for the 2004 season. He was again a finalist for the Heisman Trophy in 2004, trying to become just the second player after Archie Griffin to win the honor twice, but instead finished third behind his Sooner backfield mate, runner-up Adrian Peterson, and winner Matt Leinart. White did win the Davey O'Brien Award for the second straight year, becoming the third quarterback ever to win the prestigious award two years in a row. White and Peterson led the Sooners to another national championship game, the Orange Bowl, in 2004, but lost 55–19 to Leinart's USC Trojans. White finished his collegiate career as the University of Oklahoma's all-time leader in career passing yards (8,012) and touchdown passes (81).

- 2005 BCS National Championship Game – Oklahoma 19, USC 55

White's on-the-field accomplishments have been further honored in Tuttle with the painting of a local water tower to read "Home of Jason White 2003 Heisman Trophy Winner". This tower is readily seen from the center of town, just west of State Highways 4 and 37. Additionally, a section of Cimarron Road in the city was renamed "Jason White Boulevard".

=== College statistics ===
Season	Team	GP	Passing						
Season	Team	GP	Cmp	Att	Pct	Yds	TD	Int	Rtg
1999	Oklahoma	3	1	2	50.0	9	0	0	87.8
2000	Oklahoma	0	Redshirt						
2001	Oklahoma	7	73	113	64.6	681	5	3	124.5
2002	Oklahoma	3	20	34	58.8	181	1	2	101.5
2003	Oklahoma	14	278	451	61.6	3,846	40	10	158.1
2004	Oklahoma	13	255	390	65.4	3,205	35	9	159.4
Career		40	627	990	63.3	7,922	81	24	152.7

=== Awards and honors ===
- BCS national champion (2000)
- Heisman Trophy (2003)
- Maxwell Award (2004)
- Johnny Unitas Golden Arm Award (2004)
- 2× Davey O'Brien Award (2003, 2004)
- AP College Football Player of the Year (2003)
- SN Player of the Year (2003)
- Quarterback of the Year (2003)
- Unanimous All-American (2003)
- Third-team All-American (2004)
- 2× Big 12 Offensive Player of the Year (2003, 2004)
- 2× First-team All-Big 12 (2003, 2004)

== Professional career ==
Despite his strong college career, White was not selected in the 2005 NFL draft. Reportedly, a number of teams were reluctant to select him due to his history of knee injuries. He did not receive a tryout from any NFL team in the first several weeks of post-draft free agency. He did eventually receive a tryout from the Kansas City Chiefs, who opted not to sign him. On May 5, 2005, he signed a two-year contract with the Tennessee Titans. However, on August 11, 2005, White retired from football, citing weak knees from previous injuries. White had expressed an interest in coaching. White became the only Heisman Trophy winner to be unsuccessful in an attempt to play professional football and just the third Heisman Trophy winner not to be drafted in the NFL after Pete Dawkins instead chose a military career and Charlie Ward chose a career in the NBA.

== Life after football ==
Today, White owns and operates the Jason White Companies, which owns A Store Divided, an OU/OSU memorabilia store, and a The Athlete's Foot shoe store franchise location. He also worked with insurance agent Steve Owens, another former Sooner Heisman Trophy winner and former athletic director at the University of Oklahoma. Prior to that, White worked briefly for a securities firm in downtown Oklahoma City. He is a co-founder and board member of St. Anthony Hospital's YourCARE Clinic community health centers.

In 2007, a bronze statue of White was dedicated on the University of Oklahoma campus in Heisman Park, commemorating his 2003 award.

In 2011, White co-owned the Bricktown Brawlers of the Indoor Football League.

In 2017, White was inducted into the Oklahoma Sports Hall of Fame.
