= Langston Patterson =

American football player (born 2003)

Profile
- Position: Linebacker

Personal information
- Born: February 28, 2003 (age 23); Nashville, Tennessee, U.S.
- Listed height: 6 ft 0 in (1.83 m)
- Listed weight: 229 lb (104 kg)

Career information
- High school: Christ Presbyterian Academy (Nashville, Tennessee)
- College: Vanderbilt (2022–2025)
- NFL draft: 2026: undrafted

Career history
- Dallas Cowboys (2026)*
- * Offseason or practice squad member only

Langston Patterson (born February 28, 2003) is an American football linebacker. He played college football for the Vanderbilt Commodores.

== Early life ==
Patterson attended Christ Presbyterian Academy in Nashville, Tennessee, and committed to play college football for the Vanderbilt Commodores.

== College career ==
As a freshman in 2022, Patterson appeared in all 12 games. In 2023, he led the Commodores notching 74 tackles with eight being for a loss, a sack, a forced fumble, and an interception. In 2024, Patterson posted 78 tackles with five going for a loss, a sack and a half, and two pass deflections in 11 games played. In his final season in 2025, Patterson appeared in all 13 games, totaling 69 tackles with one and a half being for a loss.

== Professional career ==
Pre-draft measurables
Height	Weight	Arm length	Hand span	Wingspan	40-yard dash	10-yard split	20-yard split	20-yard shuttle	Three-cone drill	Vertical jump	Broad jump	Bench press
6 ft 0 1/2 in (1.84 m)	229 lb (104 kg)	30 7/8 in (0.78 m)	9 1/8 in (0.23 m)	6 ft 3 3/8 in (1.91 m)	4.66 s	1.50 s	2.65 s	4.40 s	7.38 s	36.5 in (0.93 m)	10 ft 2 in (3.10 m)	20 reps
All values from Pro Day

After not being selected in the 2026 NFL draft, Patterson signed with the Dallas Cowboys as an undrafted free agent. On August 30, he was waived by the Cowboys.

== Personal life ==
Patterson is the son of former Alabama quarterback Wes Patterson and the younger brother of former Vanderbilt linebacker Kane Patterson.
