= 2025 Vanderbilt Commodores football team =

American college football season

2025 Vanderbilt Commodores football

ReliaQuest Bowl, L 27–34 vs. Iowa
- Conference: Southeastern Conference

Ranking
- Coaches: No. 15
- AP: No. 15
- Record: 10–3 (6–2 SEC)
- Head coach: Clark Lea (5th season)
- Offensive coordinator: Tim Beck (2nd season)
- Offensive scheme: Pistol
- Defensive coordinator: Steve Gregory (2nd season)
- Base defense: 4–2–5
- Home stadium: FirstBank Stadium

2025 Southeastern Conference football standings
	Conf.			Overall
Team	W		L	W		L
No. 9 Alabama y^	7	–	1	11	–	4
No. 6 Georgia y$^	7	–	1	12	–	2
No. 3 Ole Miss ^	7	–	1	13	–	2
No. 8 Texas A&M ^	7	–	1	11	–	2
No. 13 Oklahoma ^	6	–	2	10	–	3
No. 12 Texas	6	–	2	10	–	3
No. 15 Vanderbilt	6	–	2	10	–	3
Missouri	4	–	4	8	–	5
Tennessee	4	–	4	8	–	5
LSU	3	–	5	7	–	6
Kentucky	2	–	6	5	–	7
Florida	2	–	6	4	–	8
Auburn	1	–	7	5	–	7
Mississippi State	1	–	7	5	–	8
South Carolina	1	–	7	4	–	8
Arkansas	0	–	8	2	–	10
Championship: Georgia 28, Alabama 7
^ – College Football Playoff participant; $ – Conference champion; y – Championship game participant; Rankings from AP Poll

The 2025 Vanderbilt Commodores football team represented Vanderbilt University as a member of the Southeastern Conference (SEC) during the 2025 NCAA Division I FBS football season. The Commodores were led by Clark Lea in his fifth year as their head coach. The Commodores played their home games at FirstBank Stadium located in Nashville, Tennessee.

After defeating No. 11 South Carolina 31–7, Vanderbilt started 3–0 for the first time since 2017 and beat South Carolina for the first time since 2008, snapping a 16-game losing streak to the Gamecocks. This marked the first season since 1930 that Vanderbilt won each of their first three games by over 20 points. Vanderbilt's 70–21 victory over Georgia State marked the most points scored in a game by Vanderbilt since 1918. A 55–35 win over Utah State marked Vanderbilt's first 5–0 start since 2008.

Vanderbilt appeared on College GameDay against No. 10 Alabama, Vanderbilt's first GameDay appearance since 2008 and second all-time. The lone prior GameDay appearance was a 14–13 upset win over Auburn. Despite this, the Crimson Tide avenged their stunning loss against the Commodores the year prior, winning the game 30–14. Vanderbilt later appeared on GameDay again against No. 15 Missouri, making 2025 Vanderbilt's first ever season with multiple GameDay appearances. Vanderbilt would go on to defeat Missouri 17–10.

After defeating No. 10 LSU, Vanderbilt was ranked No. 10, making it the first time they have been ranked in the top ten on an AP poll since their No. 10 ranking during the 1947 season. This win also marked Vanderbilt's best start since 1950 at 6–1 and the Commodores became bowl eligible for a second consecutive season.

In the final week of the regular, Vanderbilt defeated No. 19 Tennessee 45–24, finished the regular season 10–2. This marked Vanderbilt's first win over Tennessee since 2018 and the first 10-win season in program history. A few days later, on December 2, Vanderbilt managed to flip the commitment of five-star quarterback Jared Curtis from Georgia, making him the highest-ranked signing in program history.

The Vanderbilt Commodores drew an average home attendance of 34,813, the 64th-highest of all college football teams.

== Preseason ==
Following a victory in the 2024 Birmingham Bowl that capped off a relatively successful 7–6 season, quarterback Diego Pavia announced his intention to return to Vanderbilt for the 2025 season on December 29, 2024.

=== SEC prediction poll ===
The SEC released its preseason prediction poll on July 18, 2025. The Commodores were predicted to finish 13th in the conference and also received two first-place votes.

== Schedule ==
Date	Time	Opponent	Rank	Site	TV	Result	Attendance
August 30	6:00 p.m.	Charleston Southern*		FirstBank Stadium; Nashville, TN	SECN+/ESPN+	W 45–3	35,000
September 6	6:30 p.m.	at Virginia Tech*		Lane Stadium; Blacksburg, VA	ACCN	W 44–20	65,632
September 13	6:45 p.m.	at No. 11 South Carolina		Williams–Brice Stadium; Columbia, SC	SECN	W 31–7	79,873
September 20	6:30 p.m.	Georgia State*	No. 20	FirstBank Stadium; Nashville, TN	ESPNU	W 70–21	35,000
September 27	11:45 a.m.	Utah State*	No. 18	FirstBank Stadium; Nashville, TN	SECN	W 55–35	33,688
October 4	2:30 p.m.	at No. 10 Alabama	No. 16	Bryant–Denny Stadium; Tuscaloosa, AL (College GameDay)	ABC	L 14–30	100,077
October 18	11:00 a.m.	No. 10 LSU	No. 17	FirstBank Stadium; Nashville, TN	ABC	W 31–24	35,000
October 25	2:30 p.m.	No. 15 Missouri	No. 10	FirstBank Stadium; Nashville, TN (College GameDay)	ESPN	W 17–10	35,000
November 1	11:00 a.m.	at No. 20 Texas	No. 9	Darrell K Royal–Texas Memorial Stadium; Austin, TX (SEC Nation)	ABC	L 31–34	102,338
November 8	3:00 p.m.	Auburn^{†}	No. 16	FirstBank Stadium; Nashville, TN	SECN	W 45–38 ^{OT}	35,000
November 22	2:30 p.m.	Kentucky	No. 14	FirstBank Stadium; Nashville, TN (SEC Nation; rivalry)	ESPN	W 45–17	35,000
November 29	2:30 p.m.	at No. 19 Tennessee	No. 14	Neyland Stadium; Knoxville, TN (SEC Nation; rivalry)	ESPN	W 45–24	101,915
December 31	11:00 a.m.	vs. No. 23 Iowa*	No. 14	Raymond James Stadium; Tampa, FL (ReliaQuest Bowl)	ESPN	L 27–34	35,382
*Non-conference game; ^{†}Homecoming; Rankings from AP Poll (and CFP Rankings, after November 4) - Released prior to game; All times are in Central time

== Game summaries ==
=== vs Charleston Southern ===
Charleston Southern Buccaneers (FCS) (0–0) at Vanderbilt Commodores (0–0) – Game summary

Quarter	1	2	3	4	Total
Buccaneers (FCS)	0	0	0	3	3
Commodores	14	14	7	10	45

at FirstBank Stadium • Nashville, Tennessee

- Date: August 30
- Game time: 6:00 p.m. CDT
- Game weather: Sunny, 81 °F (27 °C)
- Game attendance: 35,000
- Referee: Jeff Heaser
- TV announcers (SECN+/ESPN+): Kevin Fitzgerald (play-by-play) and Charles Arbuckle (analyst)
- Box score, Recap

Game information

First quarter

- VAN – Kayleb Barnett 9-yard pass from Diego Pavia (Brock Taylor kick), 10:13. Commodores 7–0. Drive: 8 plays, 75 yards, 4:47.
- VAN – Junior Sherrill 12-yard pass from Diego Pavia (Brock Taylor kick), 6:59. Commodores 14–0. Drive: 4 plays, 53 yards, 1:32.

Second quarter

- VAN – A. J. Newberry 4-yard run (Brock Taylor kick), 10:19. Commodores 21–0. Drive: 14 plays, 89 yards, 7:45.
- VAN – Sedrick Alexander 26-yard pass from Diego Pavia (Brock Taylor kick), 3:11. Commodores 28–0. Drive: 5 plays, 64 yards, 1:51.

Third quarter

- VAN – Makhilyn Young 4-yard run (Brock Taylor kick), 5:47. Commodores 35–0. Drive: 4 plays, 21 yards, 2:27.

Fourth quarter

- VAN – Brock Taylor 35-yard field goal, 11:48. Commodores 38–0. Drive: 4 plays, 2 yards, 0:00.
- VAN – Jamezell Lassiter 35-yard run (Brock Taylor kick), 7:14. Commodores 45–0. Drive: 4 plays, 59 yards, 2:12.
- CHSO – Zach Gordon 38-yard field goal, 0:07. Commodores 45–3. Drive: 11 plays, 54 yards, 7:07.

Statistics	CHSO	VAN
First downs	7	25
Plays–yards	46–135	59–481
Rushes–yards	27–47	31–201
Passing yards	88	280
Passing: comp–att–int	10–19–1	21–28–0
Turnovers	2	0
Time of possession	27:51	32:09

Team	Category	Player	Statistics
Charleston Southern	Passing	Zolten Osborne	8/16, 54 yards, INT
Charleston Southern	Rushing	Isaiah Gordon	8 rushes, 28 yards
Charleston Southern	Receiving	Jamil Bishop	2 receptions, 36 yards
Vanderbilt	Passing	Diego Pavia	20/25, 275 yards, 3 TD
Vanderbilt	Rushing	Sedrick Alexander	12 rushes, 83 yards
Vanderbilt	Receiving	Eli Stowers	4 receptions, 86 yards

=== at Virginia Tech ===
Vanderbilt Commodores (1–0) at Virginia Tech Hokies (0–1) – Game summary

Quarter	1	2	3	4	Total
Commodores	0	10	13	21	44
Hokies	10	10	0	0	20

at Lane Stadium • Blacksburg, Virginia

- Date: September 6
- Game time: 6:30 p.m. CDT / 7:30 p.m. EDT
- Game weather:
- Game attendance: 65,632
- Referee: Kyle Olson
- TV announcers (ACCN): Wes Durham (play-by-play), Steve Addazio (analyst), and Dana Boyle (sideline)

Game information

First quarter

- VT – John Love 28-yard field goal, 7:11. Hokies 3–0. Drive: 15 plays, 64 yards, 7:49.
- VT – Ja'Ricous Hairston 2-yard pass from Kyron Drones (John Love kick), 0:06. Hokies 10–0. Drive: 8 plays, 85 yards, 4:27.

Second quarter

- VAN – Brycen Coleman 54-yard pass from Diego Pavia (Brock Taylor kick), 14:51. Hokies 10–7. Drive: 2 plays, 75 yards, 0:15.
- VT – Kyron Drones 1-yard run (John Love kick), 11:10. Hokies 17–7. Drive: 6 plays, 27 yards, 2:15.
- VAN – Brock Taylor 29-yard field goal, 4:19. Hokies 17–10. Drive: 12 plays, 64 yards, 6:51.
- VT – John Love 27-yard field goal, 0:00. Hokies 20–10. Drive: 13 plays, 65 yards, 4:19.

Third quarter

- VAN – Makhilyn Young 1-yard run (Brock Taylor kick), 8:02. Hokies 20–17. Drive: 11 plays, 75 yards, 6:58.
- VAN – Tre Richardson 26-yard pass from Diego Pavia (Brock Taylor kick failed), 0:24. Commodores 23–20. Drive: 7 plays, 75 yards, 5:26.

Fourth quarter

- VAN – Sedrick Alexander 18-yard run (Brock Taylor kick), 10:13. Commodores 30–20. Drive: 8 plays, 56 yards, 4:30.
- VAN – Sedrick Alexander 6-yard run (Brock Taylor kick), 6:05. Commodores 37–20. Drive: 3 plays, 72 yards, 1:39.
- VAN – Eli Stowers 9-yard pass from Blaze Berlowitz (Brock Taylor kick), 2:12. Commodores 44–20. Drive: 7 plays, 31 yards, 2:21.

Statistics	VAN	VT
First downs	23	16
Plays–yards	57–490	60–248
Rushes–yards	37–262	31–114
Passing yards	228	134
Passing: comp–att–int	14–20–1	17–29–0
Turnovers	2	1
Time of possession	32:12	27:48

Team	Category	Player	Statistics
Vanderbilt	Passing	Diego Pavia	12/18, 193 Yards, 2 TD, INT
Vanderbilt	Rushing	Makhilyn Young	8 Carries, 95 Yards, TD
Vanderbilt	Receiving	Eli Stowers	4 Receptions, 29 Yards, TD
Virginia Tech	Passing	Kyron Drones	17/29, 134 Yards, TD
Virginia Tech	Rushing	Kyron Drones	13 Carries, 36 Yards, TD
Virginia Tech	Receiving	Cameron Seldon	3 Receptions, 10 Yards

=== at No. 11 South Carolina ===
Vanderbilt Commodores (2–0) at No. 11 South Carolina Gamecocks (2–0) – Game summary

Quarter	1	2	3	4	Total
Commodores	7	7	7	10	31
No. 11 Gamecocks	7	0	0	0	7

at Williams–Brice Stadium • Columbia, South Carolina

- Date: September 13
- Game time: 6:45 p.m. CDT / 7:45 p.m. EDT
- Game weather: Clear • Temperature: 75 °F (24 °C) • Wind: NE at 3 miles per hour (4.8 km/h)
- Game attendance: 79,873
- Referee: Daniel Gautreaux
- TV announcers (SECN): Tom Hart (play-by-play), Jordan Rodgers (analyst), and Cole Cubelic (sideline)

Game information

First quarter

- VAN – Sedrick Alexander 18-yard pass from Diego Pavia (Brock Taylor kick), 9:33. Commodores 7–0. Drive: 9 plays, 73 yards, 5:22.
- SC – Rahsul Faison 7-yard run (William Joyce kick), 5:58. Tied 7–7. Drive: 7 plays, 75 yards, 3:35.

Second quarter

- VAN – Junior Sherrill 5-yard pass from Diego Pavia (Brock Taylor kick), 1:56. Commodores 14–7. Drive: 12 plays, 76 yards, 5:59.

Third quarter

- VAN – Jamezell Lassiter 44-yard run (Brock Taylor kick), 10:48. Commodores 21–7. Drive: 4 plays, 75 yards, 2:20.

Fourth quarter

- VAN – Brock Taylor 51-yard field goal, 9:31. Commodores 24–7. Drive: 6 plays, 18 yards, 3:48.
- VAN – Sedrick Alexander 2-yard run (Brock Taylor kick), 5:29. Commodores 31–7. Drive: 5 plays, 37 yards, 2:29.

Statistics	VAN	SC
First downs	22	20
Plays–yards	63–323	63–328
Rushes–yards	37–146	29–86
Passing yards	177	242
Passing: comp–att–int	18–26–1	24–34–2
Turnovers	1	4
Time of possession	35:43	24:17

Team	Category	Player	Statistics
Vanderbilt	Passing	Diego Pavia	18–27, 177 yards, 2 TD, INT
Vanderbilt	Rushing	Jamezell Lassiter	1 carry, 44 yards, TD
Vanderbilt	Receiving	Eli Stowers	3 receptions, 45 yards
South Carolina	Passing	Luke Doty	18–27, 148 yards, INT
South Carolina	Rushing	Rahsul Faison	15 carries, 74 yards, TD
South Carolina	Receiving	Nyck Harbor	4 receptions, 66 yards

=== vs Georgia State ===
Georgia State Panthers (1–2) at No. 20 Vanderbilt Commodores (3–0) – Game summary

Quarter	1	2	3	4	Total
Panthers	3	6	6	6	21
No. 20 Commodores	21	21	14	14	70

at FirstBank Stadium • Nashville, Tennessee

- Date: September 20
- Game time: 6:30 p.m.
- Game weather: Partly cloudy, 86°F
- Game attendance: 35,000
- Referee: James Carter
- TV announcers (ESPNU): Jay Alter (play-by-play) and Rocky Boiman (analyst)

Game information

First quarter

- GAST – Braeden McAlister 52-yard field goal, 10:24. Panthers 3–0. Drive: 8 plays, 41 yards, 4:36.
- VAN – Sedrick Alexander 3-yard run (Brock Taylor kick), 5:52. Commodores 7–3. Drive: 8 plays, 75 yards, 4:32.
- VAN – Diego Pavia 16-yard run (Brock Taylor kick), 3:08. Commodores 14–3. Drive: 4 plays, 71 yards, 1:31.
- VAN – Junior Sherrill 8-yard run (Brock Taylor kick), 1:33. Commodores 21–3. Drive: 3 plays, 35 yards, 1:23.

Second quarter

- GAST – Jordon Simmons 4-yard pass from Cameran Brown (Braeden McAlister kick BLOCKED), 10:21. Commodores 21–9. Drive: 13 plays, 75 yards, 6:12.
- VAN – AJ Newberry 2-yard run (Brock Taylor kick), 4:15. Commodores 28–9. Drive: 10 plays, 52 yards, 5:56.
- VAN – AJ Newbery 8-yard run (Brock Taylor kick), 1:41. Commodores 35–9. Drive: 6 plays, 69 yards, 1:16.
- VAN – Sedrick Alexander 10-yard pass from Diego Pavia (Brock Taylor kick), 0:24. Commodores 42–9. Drive: 7 plays, 83 yards, 0:53.

Third quarter

- GAST – Leo Blackburn 3-yard pass from TJ Finley (run failed), 10:11. Commodores 42–15. Drive: 5 plays, 34 yards, 3:16.
- VAN – Makhilyn Young 60-yard run (Brock Taylor kick), 9:23. Commodores 49–15. Drive: 2 plays, 64 yards, 0:47.
- VAN – Jamison Curtis 4-yard blocked punt return, 8:38. Commodores 56–15.

Fourth quarter

- VAN – Blaze Berlowitz 7-yard run (Brock Taylor kick), 11:02. Commodores 63–15. Drive: 6 plays, 70 yards, 3:07.
- VAN – Drew Dickey 9-yard run (Mason Rohmiller kick), 7:23. Commodores 70–15. Drive: 5 plays, 41 yards, 2:16.
- GAST – DJ Riles 32-yard from TJ Finley (pass failed), 2:26. Commodores 70–21. Drive: 11 plays, 75 yards, 4:57.

Statistics	GAST	VAN
First downs	18	30
Plays–yards	68–290	61–635
Rushes–yards	20–32	37–286
Passing yards	258	349
Passing: comp–att–int	31-48-0	23-24-0
Turnovers	1	0
Time of possession	30:11	29:49

Team	Category	Player	Statistics
Georgia State	Passing	TJ Finley	22-35, 176 yards, 2 TD
Georgia State	Rushing	Rashad Amos	5 carries, 25 yards
Georgia State	Receiving	Ted Hurst	7 receptions, 71 yards
Vanderbilt	Passing	Diego Pavia	18-24, 245 yards, TD
Vanderbilt	Rushing	Diego Pavia	9 carries, 86 yards, TD
Vanderbilt	Receiving	Eli Stowers	5 receptions, 73 yards

=== vs Utah State ===
Utah State Aggies (3–1) at No. 18 Vanderbilt Commodores (4–0) – Game summary

Quarter	1	2	3	4	Total
Aggies	7	14	0	14	35
No. 18 Commodores	7	24	17	7	55

at FirstBank Stadium • Nashville, Tennessee

- Date: September 27
- Game time: 11:45 a.m.
- Game weather: Scattered clouds, 83°F
- Game attendance: 33,688
- Referee: Jason Autrey
- TV announcers (SECN): Taylor Zarzour (play-by-play), Matt Stinchcomb (analyst), and Alyssa Lang (sideline)

Game information

First quarter

- USU – Miles Davis 18-yard pass from Bryson Barnes (Tanner Rinker kick), 7:45. Aggies 7–0. Drive: 8 plays, 75 yards, 3:55.
- VAN – Junior Sherrill 21-yard pass from Diego Pavia (Brock Taylor kick), 1:29. Tied 7–7. Drive: 9 plays, 59 yards, 6:07.

Second quarter

- USU – Josh Sterzer 10-yard pass from Bryson Barnes (Tanner Rinker kick), 11:22. Aggies 14–7. Drive: 10 plays 75, 5:07.
- VAN – Diego Pavia 6-yard run (Brock Taylor kick), 6:14. Tied 14–14. Drive: 8 plays, 65 yards, 5:08.
- VAN – Junior Sherrill 18-yard pass from Diego Pavia (Brock Taylor kick), 2:18. Commodores 21–14. Drive: 6 plays, 58 yards, 2:14.
- VAN – Junior Sherrill 18-yard pass from Diego Pavia (Brock Taylor kick), 1:20. Commodores 28–14. Drive: 3 plays, 60 yards, 0:23.
- USU – Braden Pegan 9-yard pass from Bryson Barnes (Tanner Rinker kick), 0:20. Commodores 28–21. Drive: 5 plays, 75 yards, 1:00.
- VAN – Brock Taylor 46-yard field goal, 0:00. Commodores 31–21. Drive: 2 plays, 33 yards, 0:15.

Third quarter

- VAN – Eli Stowers 10-yard pass from Diego Pavia (Brock Taylor kick), 9:32. Commodores 38–21. Drive: 11 plays, 75 yards, 5:28.
- VAN – Brock Taylor 31-yard field goal, 4:13. Commodores 41–21. Drive: 8 plays, 21 yards, 3:47.
- VAN – Richie Hoskins 53-yard pass from Diego Pavia (Brock Taylor kick), 1:19. Commodores 48–21. Drive: 5 plays, 89 yards, 2:03.

Fourth quarter

- USU – Brady Boyd 14-yard pass from Jacob Conover (Tanner Rinker kick), 8:23. Commodores 48–28. Drive: 2 plays, 72 yards, 0:51.
- VAN – Makhilyn Young 15-yard run (Justin Dewers kick), 5:21. Commodores 55–28. Drive: 6 plays, 75 yards, 3:02.
- USU – Javen Jacobs 6-yard pass from Jacob Conover (Tanner Rinker kick), 0:55. Commodores 55–35. Drive: 12 plays, 75 yards, 4:26.

Statistics	USU	VAN
First downs	21	31
Plays–yards	63–393	65–543
Rushes–yards	25–119	30–222
Passing yards	274	321
Passing: comp–att–int	28-38-0	26-35-1
Turnovers	1	1
Time of possession	26:43	33:17

Team	Category	Player	Statistics
Utah State	Passing	Bryson Barnes	15-22, 161 yards, 3 TD
Utah State	Rushing	Javen Jacobs	4 carries, 63 yards
Utah State	Receiving	Broc Lane	7 receptions, 98 yards
Vanderbilt	Passing	Diego Pavia	26-34, 321 yards, 5 TD, INT
Vanderbilt	Rushing	Diego Pavia	9 carries, 79 yards, TD
Vanderbilt	Receiving	Junior Sherrill	6 receptions, 91 yards, 3 TD

=== at No. 10 Alabama ===
No. 16 Vanderbilt Commodores (5–0) at No. 10 Alabama Crimson Tide (3–1) – Game summary

Quarter	1	2	3	4	Total
No. 16 Commodores	7	7	0	0	14
No. 10 Crimson Tide	0	14	6	10	30

at Bryant–Denny Stadium • Tuscaloosa, Alabama

- Date: October 4
- Game time: 2:30 p.m.
- Game weather: Sunny, 83 °F (28 °C); Wind: W 9 mph
- Game attendance: 100,077
- Referee: Daniel Gautreaux
- TV announcers (ABC): Sean McDonough (play-by-play), Greg McElroy (analyst), and Molly McGrath (sideline)

Game information

First quarter

- (6:34) VAN – Sedrick Alexander 65-yard run, Brock Taylor kick (Drive: 6 plays, 93 yards, 3:13; Vanderbilt 7–0)

Second quarter

- (9:22) ALA – Ryan Coleman-Williams 14-yard pass from Ty Simpson, Conor Talty kick (Drive: 12 plays, 92 yards, 7:24; Tied 7–7)
- (1:33) VAN – Sedrick Alexander 4-yard pass from Diego Pavia, Brock Taylor kick (Drive: 10 plays, 38 yards, 4:23; Vanderbilt 14–7)
- (0:17) ALA – Germie Bernard 27-yard pass from Ty Simpson, Conor Talty kick (Drive: 6 plays, 78 yards, 1:11; Tied 14–14)

Third quarter

- (9:15) ALA – Conor Talty 38-yard field goal (Drive: 6 plays, 68 yards, 3:34; Alabama 17–14)
- (1:17) ALA – Conor Talty 30-yard field goal (Drive: 11 plays, 66 yards, 5:56; Alabama 20–14)

Fourth quarter

- (4:08) ALA – Conor Talty 30-yard field goal (Drive: 16 plays, 69 yards, 8:29; Alabama 23–14)
- (0:17) ALA – Jam Miller 20-yard run, Conor Talty kick (Drive: 4 plays, 28 yards, 1:01; Alabama 30–14)

Statistics	VAN	ALA
First downs	16	25
Plays–yards	54–333	69–486
Rushes–yards	19–135	38–146
Passing yards	198	340
Passing: comp–att–int	21–35–1	23–31–1
Turnovers	2	1
Time of possession	22:37	37:23

Team	Category	Player	Statistics
Vanderbilt	Passing	Diego Pavia	21/35, 198 yards, TD, INT
Vanderbilt	Rushing	Sedrick Alexander	4 carries, 76 yards, TD
Vanderbilt	Receiving	Junior Sherrill	6 receptions, 49 yards
Alabama	Passing	Ty Simpson	23/31, 340 yards, 2 TD, INT
Alabama	Rushing	Jam Miller	22 carries, 136 yards, TD
Alabama	Receiving	Ryan Coleman-Williams	6 receptions, 98 yards, TD

=== vs No. 10 LSU ===
No. 10 LSU Tigers (5–1) at No. 17 Vanderbilt Commodores (5–1) – Game summary

Quarter	1	2	3	4	Total
No. 10 Tigers	3	10	8	3	24
No. 17 Commodores	7	10	14	0	31

at FirstBank Stadium • Nashville, Tennessee

- Date: October 18
- Game time: 11:00 a.m.
- Game weather: Clear • Wind: SW at 10 miles per hour (16 km/h)
- Game attendance: 35,000
- Referee: David Smith
- TV announcers (ABC): Joe Tessitore (play-by-play), Jesse Palmer (analyst), and Katie George (sideline)

Game information

First quarter

- (9:32) LSU – Damian Ramos 48-yard field goal (Drive: 12 plays, 44 yards, 5:28; LSU 3–0)
- (3:38) VAN – Diego Pavia 1-yard run, Brock Taylor kick (Drive: 9 plays, 57 yards, 5:44; Vanderbilt 7–3)

Second quarter

- (14:50) LSU – Trey'Dez Green 24-yard pass from Garrett Nussmeier, Damian Ramos kick (Drive: 8 plays, 75 yards, 3:48; LSU 10–7)
- (5:52) VAN – Sedrick Alexander 1-yard run, Brock Taylor kick (Drive: 14 plays, 75 yards, 8:58; Vanderbilt 14–10)
- (0:45) LSU – Damian Ramos 42-yard field goal (Drive: 6 plays, 11 yards, 0:58; Vanderbilt 14–13)
- (0:02) VAN – Brock Taylor 46-yard field goal (Drive: 7 plays, 50 yards, 0:37; Vanderbilt 17–13)

Third quarter

- (9:03) VAN – Cole Spence 1-yard pass from Diego Pavia, Brock Taylor kick (Drive: 10 plays, 75 yards, 5:57; Vanderbilt 24–13)
- (6:52) LSU – Zavion Thomas 62-yard pass from Garrett Nussmeier, Trey'Dez Green pass (Drive: 5 plays, 92 yards, 2:03; Vanderbilt 24–21)
- (0:27) VAN – Diego Pavia 21-yard run, Brock Taylor kick (Drive: 10 plays, 75 yards, 6:25; Vanderbilt 31–21)

Fourth quarter

- (11:39) LSU – Damian Ramos 23-yard field goal (Drive: 9 plays, 69 yards, 3:48; Vanderbilt 31–24)

Statistics	LSU	VAN
First downs	14	20
Plays–yards	49–325	67–399
Rushes–yards	21–100	45–239
Passing yards	225	160
Passing: comp–att–int	19–28–0	14–22–0
Turnovers	0	0
Time of possession	23:29	36:31

Team	Category	Player	Statistics
LSU	Passing	Garrett Nussmeier	19/28, 225 yards, 2 TD
LSU	Rushing	Caden Durham	7 carries, 59 yards
LSU	Receiving	Zavion Thomas	4 receptions, 75 yards, TD
Vanderbilt	Passing	Diego Pavia	14/22, 160 yards, TD
Vanderbilt	Rushing	Diego Pavia	17 carries, 86 yards, 2 TD
Vanderbilt	Receiving	Cole Spence	5 receptions, 56 yards, TD

=== vs No. 15 Missouri ===
No. 15 Missouri Tigers (6–1) at No. 10 Vanderbilt Commodores (6–1) – Game summary

Quarter	1	2	3	4	Total
No. 15 Tigers	0	3	0	7	10
No. 10 Commodores	0	3	7	7	17

at FirstBank Stadium • Nashville, Tennessee

- Date: October 25
- Game time: 2:30 p.m.
- Game weather: Sunny • Temperature: 71 °F (22 °C)
- Game attendance: 35,000
- Referee: Steve Marlowe
- TV announcers (ESPN): Bob Wischusen (play-by-play), Louis Riddick (analyst), and Kris Budden (sideline)

Game information

First quarter

No scoring plays

Second quarter

- (5:11) MIZ – Robert Meyer 39-yard field goal (Drive: 13 plays, 69 yards, 7:48; Missouri 3–0)
- (2:00) VAN – Brock Taylor 38-yard field goal (Drive: 8 plays, 55 yards, 3:06; Tied 3–3)

Third quarter

- (3:51) VAN – Makhilyn Young 80-yard run, Brock Taylor kick (Drive: 1 play, 80 yards, 0:13; Vanderbilt 10–3)

Fourth quarter

- (12:49) MIZ – Jude James 6-yard pass from Matt Zollers, Robert Meyer kick (Drive: 12 plays, 75 yards, 6:02; Tied 10–10)
- (1:52) VAN – Diego Pavia 1-yard run, Brock Taylor kick (Drive: 9 plays, 44 yards, 5:10; Vanderbilt 17–10)

Statistics	MIZ	VAN
First downs	22	13
Plays–yards	78–376	45–265
Rushes–yards	41–170	26–136
Passing yards	206	129
Passing: comp–att–int	23–37–0	10–19–1
Turnovers	1	1
Time of possession	36:12	23:48

Team	Category	Player	Statistics
Missouri	Passing	Matt Zollers	14/23, 138 yards, TD
Missouri	Rushing	Ahmad Hardy	20 carries, 97 yards
Missouri	Receiving	Kevin Coleman Jr.	7 receptions, 109 yards
Vanderbilt	Passing	Diego Pavia	10/19, 129 yards, INT
Vanderbilt	Rushing	Makhilyn Young	4 carries, 86 yards, TD
Vanderbilt	Receiving	Tre Richardson	4 receptions, 62 yards

=== at No. 20 Texas ===
No. 9 Vanderbilt Commodores (7–1) at Texas Longhorns (6–2) – Game summary

Quarter	1	2	3	4	Total
No. 9 Commodores	0	10	0	21	31
No. 20 Longhorns	17	7	10	0	34

at Darrell K Royal–Texas Memorial Stadium • Austin, Texas

- Date: November 1
- Game time: 11:00 a.m.
- Game weather:
- Game attendance: 102,338
- Referee: Lee Hedrick
- TV announcers (ABC): Sean McDonough (play-by-play), Greg McElroy (analyst), and Molly McGrath (sideline)

Game information

First quarter

- (14:49) TEX – Ryan Wingo 75-yard pass from Arch Manning (Mason Shipley kick), (Drive: 1 plays, 75 yards, 0:11; Texas 7–0)
- (11:38) TEX – Mason Shipley 39-yard field goal (Drive: 5 plays, 8 yards, 1:08; Texas 10–0)
- (2:11) TEX – CJ Baxter 6–yard pass from Arch Manning (Mason Shipley kick), (Drive: 10 plays, 83 yards, 5:01; Texas 17–0)

Second quarter

- (11:22) VAN – Brock Taylor 44-yard field goal (Drive: 9 plays, 53 yards, 5:44; Texas 17–3)
- (7:02) TEX – Quintrevion Wisner 4-yard run (Mason Shipley kick), (Drive: 8 plays, 68 yards, 4:15; Texas 24–3)
- (0:11) VAN – Eli Stowers 18–yard pass from Diego Pavia (Brock Taylor kick), (Drive: 13 plays, 75 yards, 6:51; Texas 24–10)

Third quarter

- (9:12) TEX – Emmett Mosley V 6–yard pass from Arch Manning (Mason Shipley kick), (Drive: 11 plays, 93 yards, 5:15; Texas 31–10)
- (0:06) TEX – Mason Shipley 37-yard field goal (Drive: 11 plays, 51 yards, 5:31; Texas 34–10)

Fourth quarter

- (10:05) VAN – Diego Pavia 25-yard run (Two-point conversion failed), (Drive: 8 plays, 68 yards, 4:15; Texas 34–16)
- (3:54) VAN – Eli Stowers 67–yard pass from Diego Pavia (Diego Pavia pass to Junior Sherrill for two-point conversion), (Drive: 1 plays, 67 yards, 0:10; Texas 34–24)
- (0:33) VAN – Richie Hoskins 8–yard pass from Diego Pavia (Brock Taylor kick), (Drive: 12 plays, 89 yards, 2:31; Texas 34–31)

Statistics	VAN	TEX
First downs	25	23
Plays–yards	62–423	60–428
Rushes–yards	24–58	27–100
Passing yards	365	328
Passing: comp–att–int	27–38–0	25–33–0
Turnovers	0	0
Time of possession	30:59	29:01

Team	Category	Player	Statistics
Vanderbilt	Passing	Diego Pavia	27–38, 365 yards, 3 TD
Vanderbilt	Rushing	Diego Pavia	14 carries, 43 yards, TD
Vanderbilt	Receiving	Eli Stowers	7 receptions, 146 yards, 2 TD
Texas	Passing	Arch Manning	25–33, 328 yards, 3 TD
Texas	Rushing	Quintrevion Wisner	18 carries, 75 yards, TD
Texas	Receiving	Ryan Wingo	2 receptions, 89 yards, TD

=== vs Auburn ===
Auburn Tigers (4–5) at No. 16 Vanderbilt Commodores (7–2) – Game summary

Quarter	1	2	3	4	OT	Total
Tigers	7	13	10	8	0	38
No. 16 Commodores	0	10	14	14	7	45

at FirstBank Stadium • Nashville, Tennessee

- Date: November 8
- Game time: 3:00 p.m.
- Game weather:
- Game attendance: 35,000
- Referee: Kyle Olson
- TV announcers (SECN): Taylor Zarzour (play-by-play), Matt Stinchcomb (analyst), and Tori Petry (sideline)

Game information

First quarter

- AUB – Eric Singleton Jr. 14-yard pass from Ashton Daniels (Alex McPherson kick), 5:45. Tigers 7–0. Drive: 13 plays, 89 yards, 5:30.

Second quarter

- VAN – Brock Taylor 23-yard field goal, 13:30. Tigers 7–3. Drive: 13 plays, 70 yards, 7:15.
- AUB – Ashton Daniels 11-yard run (Alex McPherson kick), 10:44. Tigers 14–3. Drive: 7 plays, 75 yards, 2:46.
- AUB – Alex McPherson 26-yard field goal, 1:52. Tigers 17–3. Drive: 10 plays, 57 yards, 4:13.
- VAN – Junior Sherrill 20-yard pass from Diego Pavia (Brock Taylor kick), 1:15. Tigers 17–10. Drive: 3 plays, 75 yards, 0:37.
- AUB – Alex McPherson 47-yard field goal, 0:00. Tigers 20–10. Drive: 10 plays, 46 yards, 1:15.

Third quarter

- VAN – Sedrick Alexander 4-yard run (Brock Taylor kick), 11:24. Tigers 20–17. Drive: 6 plays, 73 yards, 1:41.
- AUB – Alex McPherson 38-yard field goal, 9:15. Tigers 23–17. Drive: 8 plays, 55 yards, 2:09.
- VAN – Tre Richardson 57-yard pass from Diego Pavia (Brock Taylor kick), 7:37. Commodores 24–23. Drive: 4 plays, 75 yards, 1:38.
- AUB – Ashton Daniels 16-yard run (Alex McPherson kick), 1:11. Tigers 30–24. Drive: 7 plays, 65 yards, 3:43.

Fourth quarter

- VAN – Diego Pavia 7-yard run (Brock Taylor kick), 14:07. Commodores 31–30. Drive: 5 plays, 75 yards, 2:04.
- VAN – Sedrick Alexander 9-yard run (Brock Taylor kick), 7:57. Commodores 38–30. Drive: 10 plays, 68 yards, 4:04.
- AUB – Cam Coleman 23-yard pass from Ashton Daniels (Ashton Daniels–Cam Coleman pass), 5:27. Tied 38–38. Drive: 6 plays, 75 yards, 2:30.

Overtime

- VAN – Cole Spence 4-yard pass from Diego Pavia (Brock Taylor kick). Commodores 45–38. Drive: 3 plays, 25 yards.

Statistics	AUB	VAN
First downs	34	30
Plays–yards	82-563	69-544
Rushes–yards	36-210	36-167
Passing yards	353	377
Passing: comp–att–int	31-46-0	25-33-0
Turnovers	0	1
Time of possession	29:00	31:00

Team	Category	Player	Statistics
Auburn	Passing	Ashton Daniels	31-44, 353 yards, 2 TD
Auburn	Rushing	Jeremiah Cobb	16 carries, 115 yards
Auburn	Receiving	Cam Coleman	10 receptions, 143 yards, TD
Vanderbilt	Passing	Diego Pavia	25-33, 377 yards, 3 TD
Vanderbilt	Rushing	Diego Pavia	18 carries, 112 yards, TD
Vanderbilt	Receiving	Tre Richardson	3 receptions, 124 yards, TD

=== vs Kentucky (rivalry) ===
Kentucky Wildcats (5–5) at No. 14 Vanderbilt Commodores (8–2) – Game summary

Quarter	1	2	3	4	Total
Wildcats	0	3	0	14	17
No. 14 Commodores	3	21	21	0	45

at FirstBank Stadium • Nashville, Tennessee

- Date: November 22
- Game time: 2:30 p.m.
- Game attendance: 35,000
- Referee: Jason McArthur
- TV announcers (ESPN): Mark Jones (play-by-play), Roddy Jones (analyst), and Quint Kessenich (sideline)

Game information

First quarter

- VAN – Brock Taylor 39-yard field goal, 1:05. Commodores 3–0. Drive: 15 plays, 53 yards, 9:48.

Second quarter

- VAN – Tre Richardson 71-yard pass from Diego Pavia (Brock Taylor kick), 13:03. Commodores 10–0. Drive: 4 plays, 86 yards, 1:01.
- VAN – Tre Richardson 15-yard pass from Diego Pavia (Brock Taylor kick), 4:35. Commodores 17–0. Drive: 7 plays, 60 yards, 2:46.
- UK – Jacob Kauwe 47-yard field goal, 0:59. Commodores 17–3. Drive: 4 plays, 4 yards, 0:54.
- VAN – Tre Richardson 56-yard pass from Diego Pavia (Brock Taylor kick), 0:38. Commodores 24–3. Drive: 3 plays, 75 yards, 0:21.

Third quarter

- VAN – Junior Sherrill 7-yard pass from Diego Pavia (Brock Taylor kick), 8:55. Commodores 31–3. Drive: 10 plays, 75 yards, 6:05.
- VAN – Diego Pavia 6-yard run (Brock Taylor kick), 3:14. Commodores 38–3. Drive: 10 plays, 75 yards, 4:17.
- VAN – Richie Hoskins 32-yard pass from Diego Pavia (Brock Taylor kick), 1:17. Commodores 45–3. Drive: 2 plays, 69 yards, 0:31.

Fourth quarter

- UK – J.J. Hester 41-yard pass from Cutter Boley (Jacob Kauwe kick), 13:41. Commodores 45–10. Drive: 8 plays, 75 yards, 2:36.
- UK – Fred Farrier II 9-yard pass from Cutter Boley (Jacob Kauwe kick), 0:02. Commodores 45–17. Drive: 12 plays, 91 yards, 1:58.

Statistics	UK	VAN
First downs	18	29
Plays–yards	80–315	69–604
Rushes–yards	19–31	25–65
Passing yards	284	539
Passing: comp–att–int	29–49–3	37–44–1
Turnovers	3	1
Time of possession	23:47	36:13

Team	Category	Player	Statistics
Kentucky	Passing	Cutter Boley	26–44, 280 yards, 2 TD, 2 INT
Kentucky	Rushing	Seth McGowan	10 carries, 27 yards
Kentucky	Receiving	Willie Rodriguez	6 receptions, 78 yards
Vanderbilt	Passing	Diego Pavia	33–39, 484 yards, 5 TD, INT
Vanderbilt	Rushing	Diego Pavia	15 carries, 48 yards, TD
Vanderbilt	Receiving	Tre Richardson	6 receptions, 159 yards, 3 TD

=== at No. 19 Tennessee (rivalry) ===
No. 14 Vanderbilt Commodores (9–2) at No. 19 Tennessee Volunteers (8–3) – Game summary

Quarter	1	2	3	4	Total
No. 14 Commodores	7	14	10	14	45
No. 19 Volunteers	7	14	0	3	24

at Neyland Stadium • Knoxville, Tennessee

- Date: November 29
- Game time: 2:30 p.m. CST / 3:30 p.m. EST
- Game weather: Partly Cloudy • Temperature: 43 °F (6 °C)
- Game attendance: 101,915
- Referee: David Smith
- TV announcers (ESPN): Tom Hart (play-by-play), Jordan Rodgers (analyst) and Cole Cubelic (sideline)

Game information

First quarter

- TENN – DeSean Bishop 2-yard run (Max Gilbert kick), 3:49. Volunteers 7–0. Drive: 12 plays, 80 yards, 4:35.
- VAN – Sedrick Alexander 28-yard run (Brock Taylor kick), 0:59. Tied 7–7. Drive: 6 plays, 75 yards, 2:50.

Second quarter

- VAN – Makhilyn Young 3-yard run (Brock Taylor kick), 11:39. Commodores 14–7. Drive: 4 plays, 78 yards, 2:14.
- TENN – Chris Brazzell II 52-yard pass from Joey Aguilar (Max Gilbert kick), 10:34. Tied 14–14. Drive: 4 plays, 75 yards, 1:05.
- TENN – DeSean Bishop 35-yard run (Max Gilbert kick), 7:51. Volunteers 21–14. Drive: 7 plays, 63 yards, 2:35.
- VAN – Tre Richardson 6-yard pass from Diego Pavia (Brock Taylor kick), 0:12. Tied 21–21. Drive: 7 plays, 52 yards, 3:12.

Third quarter

- VAN – Sedrick Alexander 5-yard run (Brock Taylor kick), 8:25. Commodores 28–21. Drive: 11 plays, 75 yards, 6:35.
- VAN – Brock Taylor 35-yard field goal, 2:12. Commodores 31–21. Drive: 8 plays, 58 yards, 5:11.

Fourth quarter

- TENN – Max Gilbert 25-yard field goal, 12:31. Commodores 31–24. Drive: 15 plays, 68 yards, 4:41.
- VAN – Diego Pavia 24-yard run (Brock Taylor kick), 8:55. Commodores 38–24. Drive: 7 plays, 70 yards, 3:30.
- VAN – Sedrick Alexander 39-yard run (Brock Taylor kick), 5:10. Commodores 45–24. Drive: 3 plays, 50 yards, 1:34.

Statistics	VAN	TENN
First downs	27	21
Plays–yards	65–579	75–382
Rushes–yards	37–314	31–83
Passing yards	265	299
Passing: comp–att–int	18-28-2	29-44-0
Turnovers	2	0
Time of possession	34:59	25:01

Team	Category	Player	Statistics
Vanderbilt	Passing	Diego Pavia	18-28, 268 yards, TD, 2 INT
Vanderbilt	Rushing	Diego Pavia	20 carries, 165 yards, TD
Vanderbilt	Receiving	Junior Sherrill	3 receptions, 76 yards
Tennessee	Passing	Joey Aguilar	29-44, 299 yards, TD
Tennessee	Rushing	DeSean Bishop	20 carries, 97 yards, 2 TD
Tennessee	Receiving	Chris Brazzell II	6 receptions, 91 yards, TD

=== vs No. 23 Iowa (ReliaQuest Bowl) ===
2025 ReliaQuest Bowl
No. 23 Iowa Hawkeyes (8–4) vs. No. 14 Vanderbilt Commodores (10–2) – Game summary

Quarter	1	2	3	4	Total
No. 23 Hawkeyes	7	7	10	10	34
No. 14 Commodores	0	3	14	10	27

at Raymond James Stadium • Tampa, FL

- Date: December 31
- Game time: 11:00 a.m. CST
- Game weather: 53 °F (12 °C), Sunny, Wind NW 6 mph (9.7 km/h)
- Game attendance: 35,382
- Referee: Nate Black (ACC)
- TV announcers (ESPN): Roy Philpott (play-by-play), Sam Acho (analyst) and Taylor Davis (sideline)

Game information

First quarter

- IOWA – Kamari Moulton 4-yard run (Drew Stevens kick), 12:55. Hawkeyes 7–0. 5 plays, 72 yards, 2:00.

Second quarter

- VAN – Brock Taylor 41-yard field goal, 7:49. Hawkeyes 7–3. 13 plays, 59 yards, 7:05.
- IOWA – Reece Vander Zee 10-yard pass from Mark Gronowski (Drew Stevens kick), 0:41. Hawkeyes 14–3. 1 play, 10 yards, 0:04.

Third quarter

- IOWA – DJ Vonnahme 21-yard pass from Mark Gronowski (Drew Stevens kick), 8:50. Hawkeyes 21–3. 6 plays, 58 yards, 3:18.
- VAN – Tre Richardson 75-yard pass from Diego Pavia (Brock Taylor kick), 8:37. Hawkeyes 21–10. 1 play, 75 yards, 0:09.
- IOWA – Drew Stevens 47-yard field goal, 3:54. Hawkeyes 24–10. 4 plays, 9 yards, 1:29.
- VAN – Joseph McVay 16-yard pass from Diego Pavia (Brock Taylor kick), 1:41. Hawkeyes 24–17. 8 plays, 70 yards, 2:06.

Fourth quarter

- IOWA – Mark Gronowski 1-yard run (Drew Stevens kick), 13:35. Hawkeyes 31–17. 5 plays, 72 yards, 2:00.
- VAN – Diego Pavia 11-yard run (Brock Taylor kick), 11:19. Hawkeyes 31–24. 5 plays, 72 yards, 2:00.
- IOWA – Drew Stevens 44-yard field goal, 4:13. Hawkeyes 34–24. 13 plays, 41 yards, 7:06.
- VAN – Brock Taylor 37-yard field goal, 2:58. Hawkeyes 34–27. 7 plays, 60 yards, 1:10.

Statistics	IOWA	VAN
First downs	19	21
Plays–yards	59–379	60–398
Rushes–yards	37–167	22–51
Passing yards	212	347
Passing: comp–att–int	16–22–1	25–38–0
Turnovers	1	0
Time of possession	32:13	27:37

Team	Category	Player	Statistics
Iowa	Passing	Mark Gronowski	16/22, 212 yards, 2 TD, INT
Iowa	Rushing	Kamari Moulton	14 carries, 95 yards, TD
Iowa	Receiving	DJ Vonnahme	7 receptions, 146 yards, TD
Vanderbilt	Passing	Diego Pavia	25/38, 347 yards, 2 TD
Vanderbilt	Rushing	Diego Pavia	15 carries, 36 yards, TD
Vanderbilt	Receiving	Tre Richardson	6 receptions, 127 yards, TD

== Roster ==
2025 Vanderbilt Commodores football team roster
Players
Coaches
Offense

Pos.	#	Name	Class
WR	0	Junior Sherrill	Jr
WR	1	Trent Hudson	GS
QB	2	Diego Pavia	GS
WR	3	Tristen Brown	So
WR	5	Richie Hoskins	GS
WR	6	Tre Richardson	Jr
QB	7	Drew Dickey	Sr
TE	9	Eli Stowers	GS
QB	10	Whit Muschamp	So
QB	11	Jack Elliott	Fr
RB	13	Chase Gillespie	Sr
QB	14	Jérémy St-Hilaire	So
WR	15	Joseph McVay	So
TE	16	Cole Spence	Sr
WR	17	Chance Fitzgerald	Jr
WR	18	Boski Barrett	So
QB	19	Blaze Berlowitz	Jr
RB	22	Makhilyn Young	Jr
RB	23	AJ Newberry	Jr
RB	28	Sedrick Alexander	Jr
RB	33	Gabe Fields	Fr
WR	35	Ryder Brownstein	Fr
WR	38	Wils Jackson	Fr
RB	41	Jamezell Lassiter	So
RB	42	Jake Balis	So
RB	43	Dominic Rezac	Sr
FB, TE	44	Gabe Fisher	Jr
TE	45	Emmanuel Adebi	GS
RB	47	Isaiah Fontan	Sr
TE	49	Elijah Rooney	So
OL	50	Chase Mitchell	GS
OL	51	Clinton Azubuike	So
OL	52	Kevo Wesley	GS
OL	53	Jordan White	GS
OL	55	Bryce Henderson	GS
OL	56	Gunner Givens	Sr
OL	57	Max Fisher	Jr
OL	58	Orion Irving	Jr
OL	62	CJ Williams	So
OL	69	Cooper Starks	Jr
OL	70	Cade McConnell	Sr
OL	71	Ted Gregoire	Jr
OL	72	Isaia Glass	GS
OL	73	Charlie Clark	GS
OL	75	Misael Sandoval	Jr
OL	77	David Siegel	Sr
OL	78	Keegan Wechsler	Jr
OL	79	Sterling Porcher	GS
WR	80	Claiborne Richards	Jr
WR	81	Kayleb Barnett	Fr
TE	82	Brycen Coleman	So
WR	83	Derek Kee	Jr
WR	85	Lebron Hill	Fr
TE	86	Witt Edwards	So
WR	87	Ty Burd	Jr
WR	89	Cameran Dickson	Fr

Defense

Pos.	#	Name	Class
CB	0	Marlon Jones	GS
S	1	Dontae Carter	So
S, OLB	2	Randon Fontenette	Jr
CB	3	Kolbey Taylor	GS
CB, WR	4	Martel Hight	Jr
DL	5	Yilanan Ouattara	Sr
CB	6	Jordan Matthews	Jr
S	7	Marlen Sewell	GS
S	8	CJ Heard	So
EDGE	9	Keanu Koht	Sr
LB	10	Langston Patterson	Sr
LB	11	Bryan Longwell	Jr
STAR	14	Jailen Ruth	Jr
DL	15	Zaylin Wood	GS
CB	17	Mark Davis	GS
S	18	Jalen Gilbert	Jr
LB	20	Prince Kollie	GS
S	21	Davin Chandler	Fr
LB	22	Bryce Cowan	Sr
S	23	Carson Lawrence	Fr
LB	24	Nick Rinaldi	Sr
CB	26	Cayden Daniels	Fr
CB	27	Jaylin Lackey	So
S	28	Thomas Jones	So
EDGE	29	Miles Capers	GS
CB	30	Trudell Berry	Sr
STAR	31	Tate Hamby	So
EDGE	32	Mason Carter	So
STAR	33	Vanzale Hinton	Fr
LB	34	Austin Howard	Fr
S	35	Payne Daniel	Jr
LB	36	Josiah Broxton	Fr
CB	37	Jack Wanzung	Fr
S	39	Brail Lipford	GS
LB	40	Jamison Curtis	So
CB	42	Blaine McClure	So
LB	43	Luke D'Alise	So
LB	45	Ty Bartholomew	Jr
CB	46	Mustafa Dannett	Sr
DL	49	Simeon Boulware	So
DL	53	Glenn Seabrooks III	So
DL	54	Mason Nelson	GS
DL	55	Aaron Bryant	Sr
DL	90	Jake Stanish	Fr
DL	92	Jaylon Stone	Jr
DL	93	Nikhil Jefferson	Fr
DL	94	Bradley Mann	Sr
DL	95	Linus Zunk	Sr
DL	96	Khordae Sydnor	GS
DL	97	Hayden Bray	GS
DL	98	Terry Nwabuisi-Ezeala	So
DL	99	Joshua Singh	GS

Special teams

Pos.	#	Name	Class
P	38	Nick Haberer	GS
K	40	Mason Rohmiller	Sr
LS	41	Stone Owens	Fr
LS	46	Durham Harris	GS
K	47	Justin Dewers	Fr
P	79	Conor Weasler	Jr
K	88	Brock Taylor	Jr

Head coach

- Clark Lea
  Head coach

Coordinators/assistant coaches

- Jerry Kill
  Chief consultant to the head coach/
  Senior offensive advisor
- Tim Beck
  Offensive coordinator
- Steve Gregory
  Defensive coordinator
- Nick Lezynski
  Co-defensive coordinator/Linebackers
- Jeff LePak
  Special teams coordinator/Tight ends
- Ghaali Muhammad-Lankford
  Run game coordinator/Running backs
- Alex Bailey
  Pass game coordinator/Wide receivers
- Larry Black
  Defensive run game coordinator/Defensive line
- Jovan Haye
  Defensive ends
- Melvin Rice
  Safeties
- Jamaal Richardson
  Cornerbacks
- Chris Klenakis
  Offensive line
- Brendan Flaherty
  Tight ends
- Jimmy Thompson
  Stars/Nickels
- Garrett Altman
  Quarterbacks
- Shane Gallant
  Specialists/Assistant special teams
- Josh Adams
  Assistant running backs
- Arion Shinaver
  Assistant safeties
- Justin Harris
  Assistant cornerbacks
- Jafar Williams
  Assistant wide receivers
- Jeff Nady
  Assistant offensive line
- Jordan Matthews
  Offensive Consultant

Legend

- (C) Team captain
- (S) Suspended
- (I) Ineligible
- Injured
- Redshirt

Roster
Last update: August 26, 2025

== Rankings ==
Ranking movements Legend: ██ Increase in ranking ██ Decrease in ranking — = Not ranked RV = Received votes
	Week																
Poll	Pre	1	2	3	4	5	6	7	8	9	10	11	12	13	14	15	Final
AP	—	—	RV	20	18	16	20	17	10	9	15	13	12	12	13	13	15
Coaches	RV	RV	RV	23	20	17	20	18	12	11	16	14	13	12	12	12	15
CFP	Not released										16	14	14	14	14	14	Not released
