= Emma Lewis Lipps =

American botanist and professor (1919 to 1996)

Doctor Emma Lewis Lipps
- Born: February 8, 1919; Alexandria, Virginia, US
- Died: July 19, 1996 (aged 77); Rome, Georgia, US
- Burial place: Myrtle Hill Cemetery
- Occupation: Professor
- Title: Doctor

Academic background
- Education: Wesleyan College; Emory University; University of Tennessee
- Thesis: Plant communities of a portion of Floyd County, Georgia-especially the Marshall Forest.
- Doctoral advisor: Dr. Hal R. De Selm

Academic work
- Discipline: Botany, Pleistocene vertebrates

Emma Lewis Lipps (8 February 1919 - 19 July 1996) was an American botanist, botany collector, and a professor of biology and Earth science at Shorter College, Rome. Her work was primarily focused on discovering and studying the Pleistocene vertebrates' specimens from the Marshall Forest in Floyd County and the Ladd's Quarry in Bartow County. She co-authored several papers and bibliographies about her findings, including The vascular flora of the Marshall Forest, Rome, Georgia and A Devonian fauna from the Frog Mountain Sandstone, Floyd County, Georgia.

== Early life and education ==
Lipps was born on 8 February 1919 in Alexandria, Virginia, to William Lewis Lipps and Emma Ashton Truslow Lipps.

She completed her bachelors studies from Wesleyan College in 1940 and master's degree from Emory University in 1943. She graduated with a PhD in botany from the University of Tennessee in 1966. Her dissertation was titled Plant communities of a portion of Floyd County, Georgia-especially the Marshall Forest.

== Career ==
Lipps began working at the University of Georgia School of Medicine in 1940, immediately after her graduation from Wesleyan. In 1943, during World War II, she began teaching at the Agnes Scott College. She then joined the Shorter College (present-day Shorter University) as a teacher in the biology department in 1945 where she stayed for 44 years until her retirement in 1989.

During her tenure at the Shorter University, Lipps and her students used the Marshall Forest as their natural lab for biological studies. The National Council of State Garden Clubs honored her 25 years of work in the Marshall Forest in 1979.

Lipps worked on several paleontological projects in Georgia, primarily at the Ladd's Quarry for excavations, discovery and studies of the Pleistocene vertebrae. She involved her students from the Shorter College to work on these projects resulting in a number of Devonian flora and fauna samples and fossils delivered to the Smithsonian. During this time, she co-authored a seminal paper with Clayton Ray in 1966, followed by a study with Al Holman in 1980s, and an annotated bibliography with Bob Purdy and Bob Martin in 1988.

Shorter University established the Lewis Lipps Ecology Lectureship in 1991 to discuss modern ecological issues. The inaugural lecture was given by Lipps' dissertation advisor, Dr. Hal R. De Selm.

== Publications ==
- Lipps, E. L. (1949). Investigation of the effect of niacin on populations of the Mainx strain Euglena gracilis Klebs. (Doctoral dissertation, Emory University).
- Lipps, E.L. (1966). Plant communities of a portion of Flloyd County, Georgia — Especially the Marshall Forest. Doctoral Thesis, University of Tennessee.
- Lipps, E. L. and H. R. De Selm. (1969). The vascular flora of the Marshall Forest, Rome, Georgia. Castanea 34 (4): 414–432.
- Lipps, E. L., Purdy, R. W., & Martin, R. A. (1988). An annotated bibliography of the Pleistocene vertebrates of Georgia. Georgia Journal of Science, 25, 113–119.
