= Eric Floyd =

Eric Floyd may refer to:

- Sleepy Floyd (Eric Augustus Floyd, born 1960), American basketball player
- Eric Floyd (American football) (born 1965), American football player
