= Frankie Welch =

American fashion designer (1924–2021)

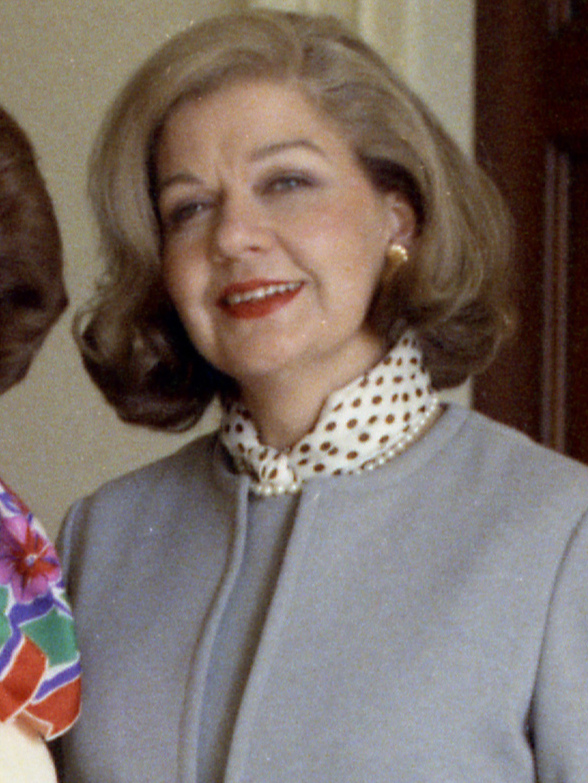
- Welch in 1975
- Born: Mary Frances Barnett; March 29, 1924; Rome, Georgia, U.S.
- Died: 2 September 2021 (aged 97); Charlottesville, Virginia, U.S.
- Other names: Mary Frances Welch
- Occupation(s): Teacher, fashion designer

Frankie Welch (March 29, 1924 – September 2, 2021) was an American fashion designer from Rome, Georgia. She is primarily known for designing scarves for prominent political figures, which she sold from her boutique in Alexandria, Virginia. After a career as a home economics teacher that spanned nearly two decades, Welch began working as a fashion consultant. Developing a clientele, she moved into designing accessories and then dresses. Welch was the designer of a dress worn by First Lady Betty Ford, which is now on display in the Smithsonian's First Ladies' Hall in the National Museum of American History. She also designed dresses on display at the Gerald R. Ford Presidential Library.

== Early life and education ==
Welch's 1944 wedding photo

Mary Frances Barnett was born in 1924 in Rome, Georgia, to Eugenia (née Morton) and James Wyatt Barnett. As a high school student, Barnett enjoyed fashion and consulted her friends on style. Her father worked for the telephone company and her family had deep roots in Georgia. She claimed to be 1/32 Cherokee; however, she is non-Native American. Her great-grandfather built Georgia's first lumber mill and her grandfather served in the Confederate Army.

Barnett graduated from Rome High School in 1941 and then enrolled at Furman University in Greenville, South Carolina. At the completion of her junior year, on June 3, 1944, Barnett married her childhood sweetheart, William Calvin Welch, in Rome, Georgia. After graduating from Furman, with her bachelor's degree, Welch continued her studies at the University of Georgia, before following her husband, who had been discharged from the military, to Wisconsin. There, she studied design at the University of Wisconsin.

== Career ==
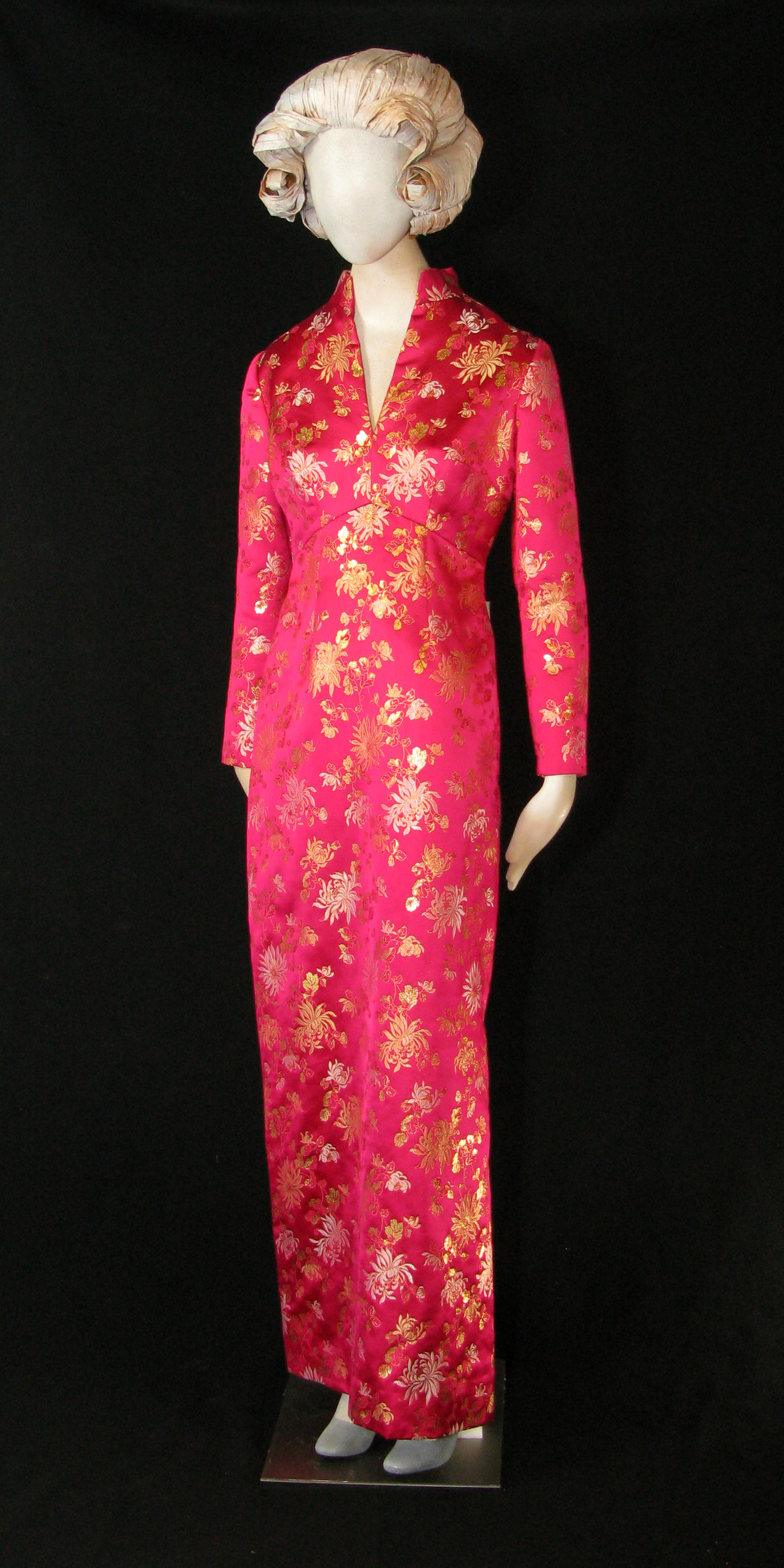
First Lady Betty Ford's pink brocade gown designed by Welch in 1974

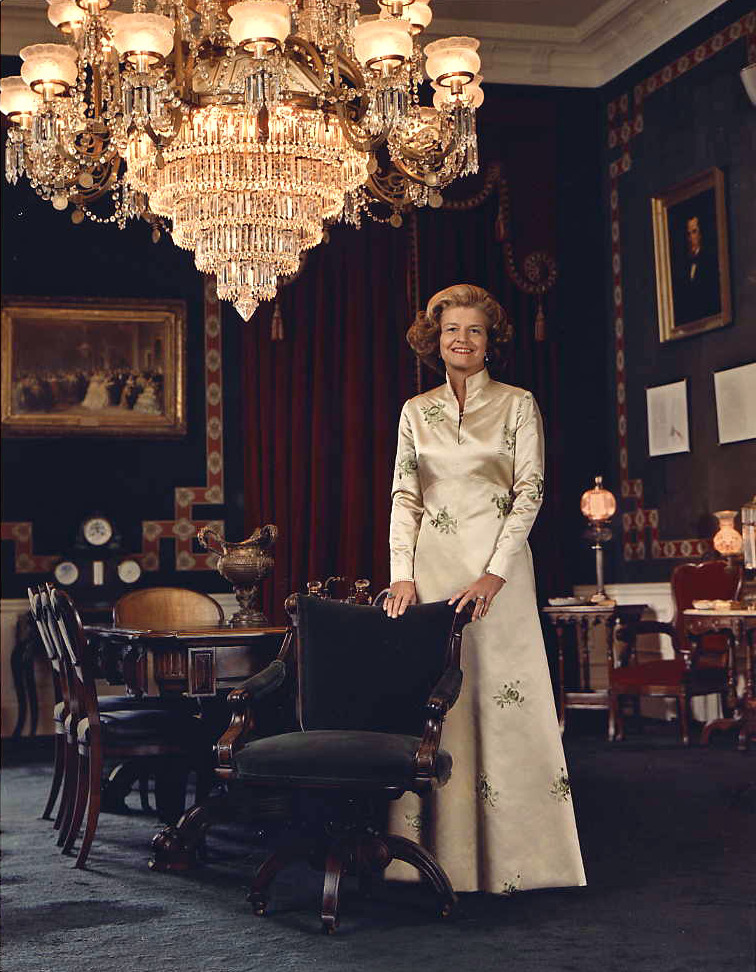
Official portrait of First Lady Betty Ford in Welch's gown on December 24, 1975

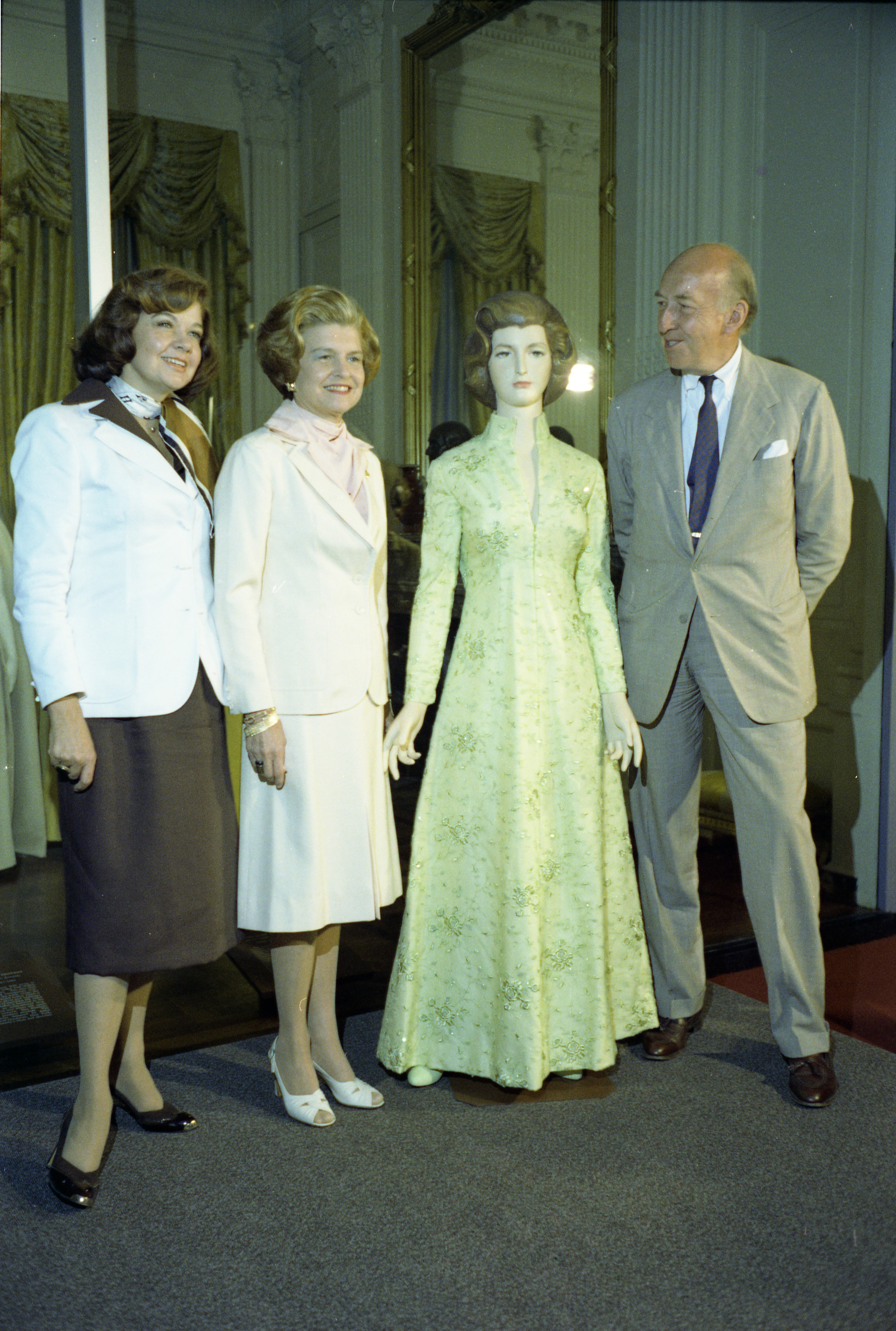
Welch (left), Betty Ford (second from left), and Sidney Dillon Ripley (right) pose in 1976 with a mannequin dressed in a gown Welch designed for Ford that Ford is donating to the Smithsonian Institution

Welch began her career in Madison, Wisconsin, teaching elementary school, and the couple had their first daughter, Peggy. When Bill was transferred to work with the Central Intelligence Agency in 1952, the family moved to Washington, D. C. in 1953. and Welch continued teaching. She worked as a sewing instructor at the Washington and Lee High School in Montross, Virginia and had her second daughter, Genie.

In 1960, she designed a versatile dress known as "The Frankie", as an instructional aid to help her students visualize waistline treatments. That same year, Ingenue, a teen magazine named her the "Outstanding Home Economics Teacher of the Nation" and awarded her with a trip to visit the fashion houses of Paris and Rome.

In September 1963, she opened a shop at 305 Cameron Street in Alexandria, Virginia, operating an official guest house on the upper floors and her clothing shop on the street level. The house was noted in guidebooks as a tourist attraction, since George Washington and his men had dined there and it was the first bank in Virginia. By 1964, she was marketing "The Frankie" nationwide. The adaptable design came in various fabrics and hem-lengths, and could be worn in multiple ways, depending on how the waist ties were joined.

Meeting the elite women of Washington, D.C., at various social functions, Welch began consulting with them on fashion. Developing a clientele, she soon switched to design. In 1967, as part of an initiative for the Native American education service, she designed a scarf featuring the Cherokee syllabary. Welch donated one dollar from the purchase of each scarf to the higher education fund of the Eastern Cherokee. The scarf caught the attention of First Lady Lady Bird Johnson. Johnson asked Welch to create a scarf which would promote her "Discover America" campaign. The scarf became a featured item at the first fashion show ever held at the White House.

She designed a scarf with a daisy pattern for the 1968 Republican National Convention and was then asked to design a scarf for Hubert Humphrey's 1968 presidential campaign, featuring his HH logo. When Richard Nixon won the presidency that year, Welch was commissioned to design a scarf with his slogan "Forward Together" as a commemoration of his Inaugural.

After the Nixon resignation in 1974, First Lady Betty Ford wore a Welch design to greet the press. Her official photograph was taken in a Welch design made of green silk, which Ford had brought back from China. The same year, she published Indian Jewelry: How to Wear, Buy and Treasure America's First Fashion Pieces, which was full of tips on how to determine the quality of jewelry and gave information about various types of materials used in jewelry design. She also designed a collection of contemporary bracelets, earrings and necklaces for her store. Her husband died in 1975.

In 1976, when Ford selected which gown was to be presented to the First Lady's Hall, she selected a Welch dress in a princess style, with a Chinese-style high collar. The dress was first worn in 1975 for the Shah of Iran's state dinner and later worn by the First Lady to a dinner for King Juan Carlos I of Spain and Queen Sofía in 1976. Welch designed Ford's official scarf, which she gave to visiting dignitaries, on a floral and polka dot background with the First Lady's signature imprinted.

Among Welch's corporate clients were McDonald's and Time-Life. She designed scarfs and tote bags for Auburn University, the University of Georgia and the United States Military Academy and organizations like the Arkansas Democrats Association, the American Medical Association, the Congressional Wives' Club, the Princeton Club, the United States Marine Corps, and the United States Historical Society, as well as St Paul's Cathedral in London, The Indianapolis 500, and the Watergate Hotel. She designed a dress and a scarf with a peanut motif for Jimmy Carter's gubernatorial race; a scarf for the United States Bicentennial featuring the original 13 colonies; and a series of scarves depicting the official state flowers of all fifty states. She later designed scarves with the peanut featured for Carter's presidential run; scarves, ties, tote bags and umbrellas, for Ronald Reagan's inaugural festivities and a scarf for President Bill Clinton in 1993.

Welch expanded her business, opening satellite stores in the Washington, D.C. area in the 1970s and consulted on interior design. She relocated to an apartment in the Watergate complex, but kept the Alexandria dress shop until 1982, when she sold it to her daughter Genie Welch so that she could focus more on designing.

In 1990, the shop closed and Welch continued to design and teach courses on design for several years. She retired to Charlottesville, Virginia. In 2016, a dress designed for First Lady Betty Ford, part of the collection of the Gerald R. Ford Presidential Library, toured the country in the Native Fashion Now exhibit sponsored by the National Museum of the American Indian's George Gustav Heye Center in Manhattan and the Peabody Essex Museum of Salem, Massachusetts. The pink brocade dress was designed for the 1974 White House Christmas Party.
