= Rome City School District (Georgia) =

School district in Georgia (U.S. state)

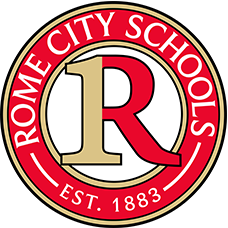

Address
- 508 East 2nd Street Rome, Georgia, 30161–3112; United States
- Coordinates: 34.254066°N 85.168644°W

District information
- Grades: Pre-kindergarten – 12
- Superintendent: Eric L. Holland
- Accreditation(s): Southern Association of Colleges and Schools; Georgia Accrediting Commission

Students and staff
- Enrollment: 6,573 (2022–23)
- Faculty: 510.20 (FTE)
- Staff: 469.60 (FTE)
- Student–teacher ratio: 12.88

Other information
- Telephone: (706) 236–5050
- Fax: (706) 802–4311
- Website: rcs.rome.ga.us

The Rome City School District is a public school district in Floyd County, Georgia, United States, based in the city of Rome. It serves the city limits of Rome.

== Schools ==
The Rome City School District has six elementary schools, one middle school, and one high school.

=== Elementary schools ===
- Anna K. Davie Elementary School
- East Central Elementary School
- Elm Street Elementary School
- Main Elementary School
- West Central Elementary School
- West End Elementary School

=== Middle school ===
- Rome Middle School

=== High schools ===
- Rome High School
- Phoenix Performance Learning Center

== Former schools ==
=== High schools ===
- Tower Hill School (Rome, Georgia); open from 1883, building was demolished in 1961
- Main High School (Rome, Georgia), opened from 1884 until 1969, with periods of transitions.
- Girls' High School (Rome, Georgia)
- Boys' High School (Rome, Georgia)
- West Rome High School
- East Rome High School
- North Heights Elementary School

== Safety ==
In August 2022, in the same week two students at Rome High School were found with a gun on campus. After these incidents, the school went on a flexible learning day to call an emergency board meeting to review safety and security measures.
