= Rome High School =

School in Georgia, United States

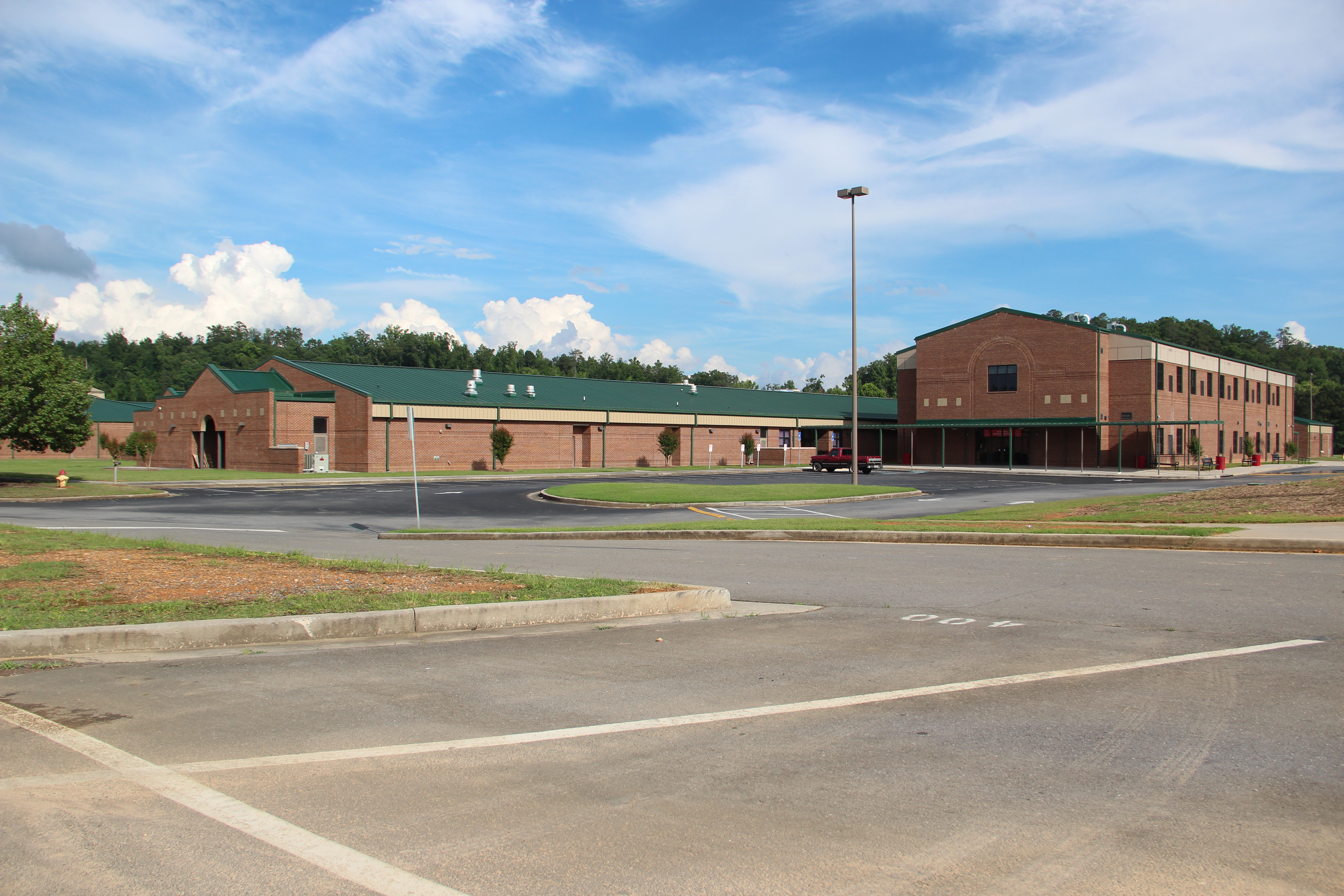
- Rome High School in May 2018

Location
- 1000 Veteran's Memorial Highway; Rome, Georgia 30161; United States; 34°17′13″N 85°09′09″W

Information
- School type: Public, high school
- Established: 1992
- School district: Rome City School District
- NCES District ID: 1304440
- NCES School ID: 130444000028
- Principal: Parke Wilkinson
- Teaching staff: 123.10
- Grades: 9–12
- Enrollment: 1,986 (2024–2025)
- Student to teacher ratio: 16.13
- Campus type: Small urban
- Colors: Red and gold
- Athletics conference: GHSA Class 5A, Region 5
- Team name: Wolves
- Yearbook: Capitolium
- Website: romehighwolves.net

Rome High School (RHS) is a public high school that opened in 1992 and is located in Rome, Georgia, United States. It is a part of Rome City School District.

== About ==
Rome High offers Advanced Placement (AP), Dual Enrollment, and Career Technical and Agricultural Educations (CTAE) classes. The school has an average ACT score of 24, and an average SAT score of 1130. Rome High School receives Title 1 funding.

In 2020–2021, the total school minority enrollment is 74%; and 66% of students at the school are economically disadvantaged.

The Rome High Marching Band is known as the, "Sound of the Seven Hills." In 2023, Thomas "Tab" Brown was named the director of bands for the school. The Rome High Chorus has four different chorus groups, including the advanced chorale, advanced women’s chorus, men’s chorus, and beginning women’s chorus. The Rome High Theatre Department has produced varied stage productions, including Once Upon a Mattress (2013), Beauty and the Beast (2015), and Into The Woods (2023).

== Pre-history ==
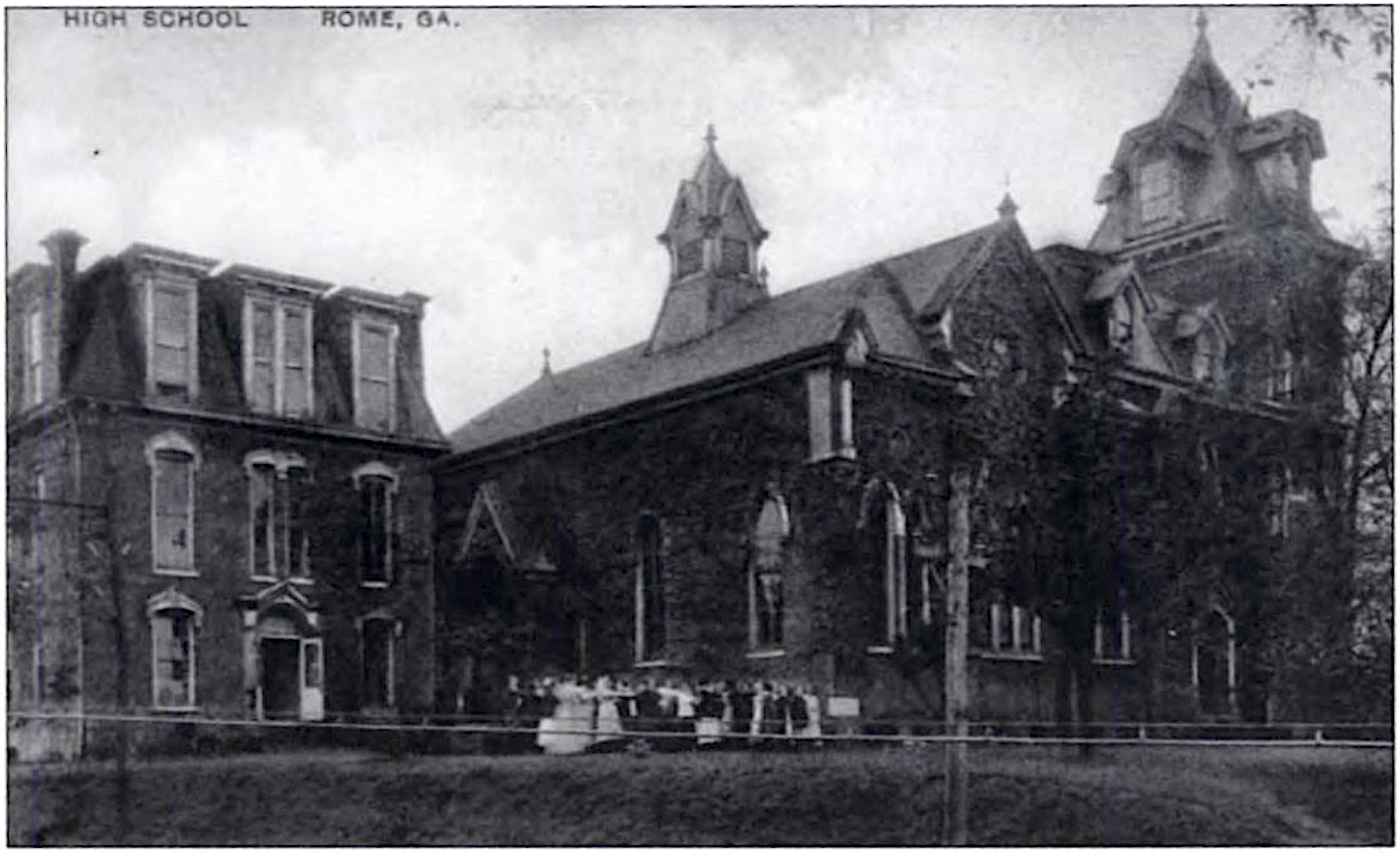
Rome High School, formerly the Shorter College building, in 1911

The former campus for Cherokee Baptist Female College, now Shorter College, was used for Rome High School, which opened on September 4, 1911. In 1980, that campus building was demolished, after a history of many fires.

In 1939, due to an increase in attendance at Rome High School, it was divided into two schools separated by gender. The all-girls high school was named Girls' High School; and the all-boys high school was named Boys' High School. The mixed-sex educational system returned to the city by 1950.

In 1958, two new schools were formed East Rome High School, and West Rome High School. These schools were all segregated and served the White students, until desegregation efforts in 1966. The Main High School, which opened in 1884 and closed in 1969, was the segregated school that served Black students in the Rome community.

The new Rome High School opened in 1992, and it replaced East Rome High School, and West Rome High School.

== History ==
The construction started at the current site at 1000 Veteran's Memorial Highway, shared with the Rome Middle School, in the summer of 1990. The new campus for Rome High School opened in 1992.

As part of the National Schools Recognition Program sponsored by the United States Department of Education in an effort to recognize distinguished public schools, the Georgia Department of Education selected this school as a "school of excellence" in 1996. The school was subsequently commended by the Georgia House of Representatives in recognition for being selected as the 1996 Georgia High School of Excellence from the 7th Congressional District. The school has been named "Best High School in America" three times by U.S. News & World Report (2008, 2009, 2012). The 2020–2021 ranking by U.S. News & World Report placed Rome High 98 of the 476 high schools in Georgia and 4,306 out of 17,245 high schools nationally.

The school and its students won two Georgia Scholastic Press Awards in 2007, and had two first place prize winners in the 2007 Georgia Humanities Council National History Day state contest.

== Athletics ==
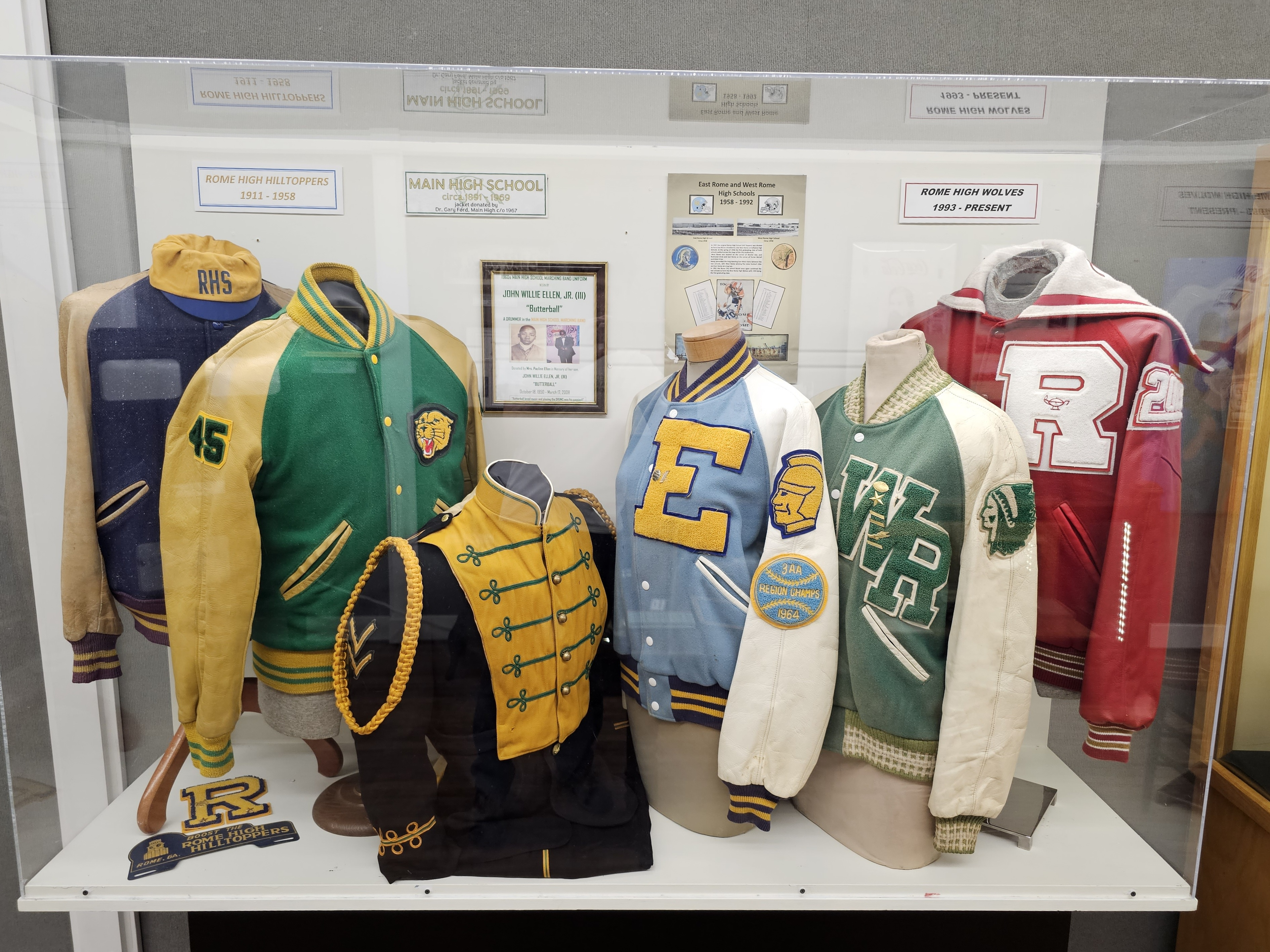
Letter jackets and a marching band uniform for Rome High School and its predecessor institutions

Rome High sponsors 13 athletic teams on campus, with boys and girls participating in varsity and junior varsity teams. Rome's teams are known as the Wolves, a reference to the she-wolf's role in the myth of the founding of Rome.

=== Football ===
The Rome High Wolves football team secured two state titles in 2016 and 2017.

On December 9, 2016, Rome High won the Georgia High School Association 5A Football Championship at the Georgia Dome. Following their 2016 championship season, they added a 38-0 victory over Warner Robins In 2017 on the Demons home field after the championship weekend In Atlanta was canceled due to weather conditions. The team plays at Barron Stadium.

== Notable alumni ==
- Adam Anderson, former college football player, Georgia Bulldogs
- Martel Hight, college football cornerback for the Vanderbilt Commodores
- Beth Shapiro, evolutionary molecular biologist, UC Santa Cruz Genomics Institute
- Frankie Welch, former fashion designer
