= Shorter University =

Baptist college in Rome, Georgia, US

- Former names: Cherokee Baptist Female College (1873–1877); Shorter Female College (1877–1948); Shorter College (1948–2010)
- Motto: Transforming Lives Through Christ
- Type: Private university
- Established: 1873; 153 years ago
- Religious affiliation: Georgia Baptist Convention
- Endowment: US$ 27 million
- President: Donald Dowless
- Provost: John D. Reams
- Faculty: 388
- Students: 1,410
- Undergraduates: 1,306
- Postgraduates: 104
- Location: Rome, Georgia, United States; 34.258°N 85.196°W
- Campus: Suburban
- Colors: Columbia blue, white and gold
- Nickname: Hawks
- Sporting affiliations: NCAA Division II – Carolinas
- Mascot: Alfred the Hawk
- Website: shorter.edu
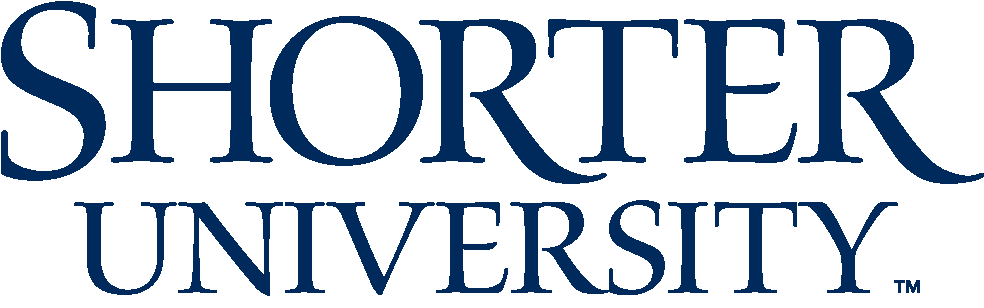

Shorter University is a private Baptist university in Rome, Georgia. It was founded in 1873 and offers undergraduate and graduate degrees through six colleges and schools. In addition, Shorter operates the Robert H. Ledbetter College of Business and the School of Nursing at off-campus facilities in the Rome area.

Fielding athletic teams known as the Shorter Hawks, the university is a member of NCAA Division II and Conference Carolinas. The official school and athletic colors are blue and white.

== History ==
=== Founding and early history ===
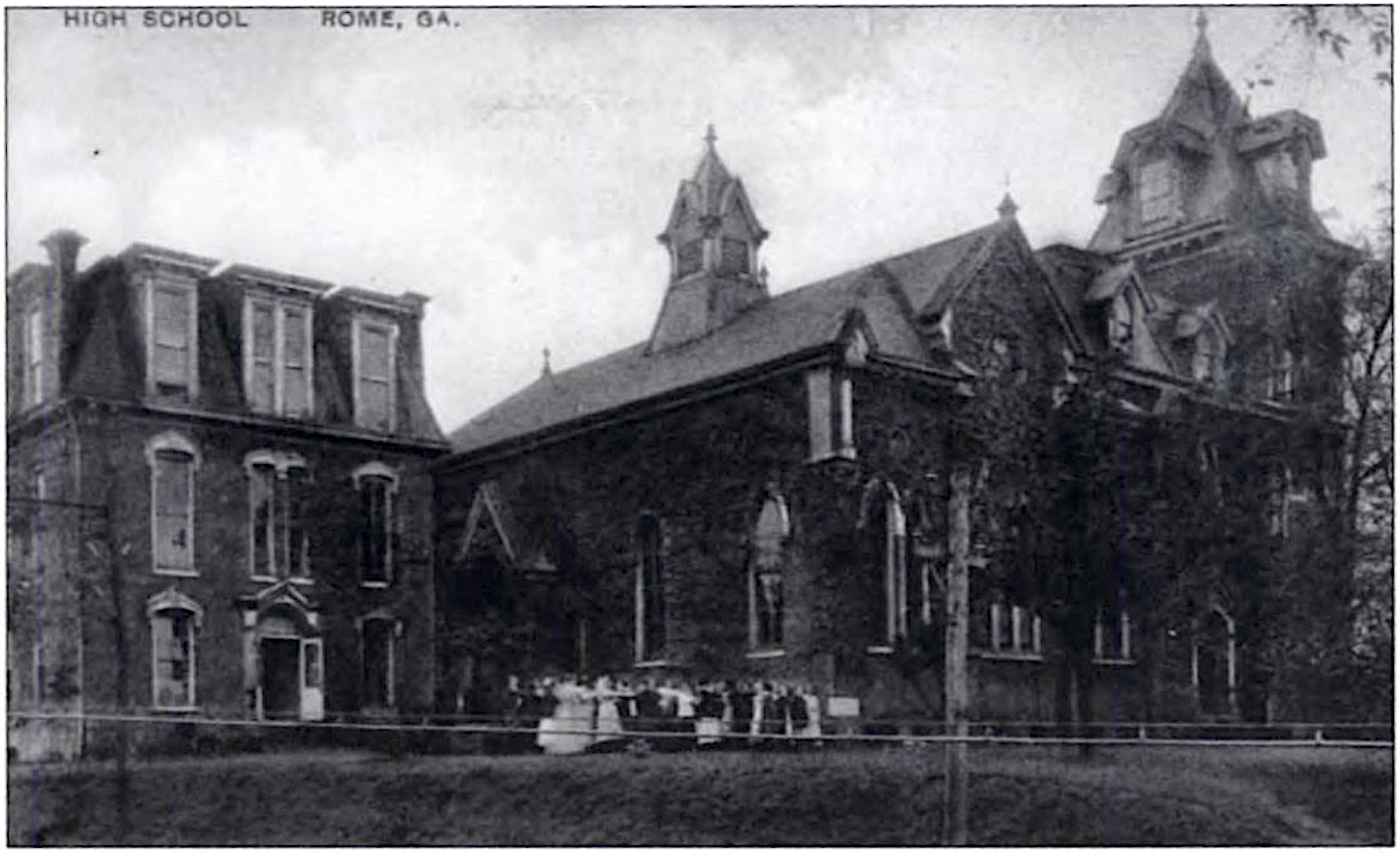
The first campus building for Cherokee Baptist Female College (or Shorter Female College); starting in 1911 the building used for Rome High School and was demolished in 1980

Shorter University was founded in 1873 by Luther Rice Gwaltney, pastor of the Rome Baptist Church, as a women's college known as the Cherokee Baptist Female College. The college was renamed in 1877 to Shorter Female College because of the financial contributions of Alfred and Martha Shorter. Shorter was located in Victorian-style buildings on Shelton Hill near downtown Rome and educated young women at primary, preparatory and collegiate levels. Classes were held Tuesdays through Saturdays and early curriculum included science, music, art, drama and literary works. Through additional contributions from the J.L. Bass and J.P. Cooper families, the university was relocated to its current site just outside Rome in 1910. The former campus was used for Rome High School, which opened on September 4, 1911.

During the 1920s the college constructed the first indoor swimming pool in the United States and swimming became a physical education graduation requirement. The era also included the first women selected for the board of trustees. During the 1920s Shorter became an accredited member in the Southern Association of Colleges and Schools, in which the university holds accreditation.

Through the years the college has struggled with financial problems, including both the 1930s with the Great Depression and World War II in the 1940s. Led by President Paul M. Cousins, faculty took cuts in salary in the periods of crisis. Academics were strengthened through membership with the National Association of Schools of Music.

=== Increasing diversity ===
In the 1950s, the college became co-educational and the addition of male students created a need for a new male-only residence hall. The university also began intercollegiate athletics program in the NAIA and initiated new clubs organizations and fraternities. Randall Minor became the college's 14th president in 1958. Under Minor, control of the selection process for trustees was given to the Georgia Baptist Convention. The college constructed a new administration building, student center, library, fine arts center and hired additional faculty for the expanding school. The late 1950s also saw the first African-American student graduate.

The political and social climate of the 1960s had a great effect on the college throughout the decade. During the era the student government's power increased and new organizations were created on campus. A number of special events were held on campus, including memorial services for both the John F. Kennedy assassination and Assassination of Martin Luther King, Jr., and Earth Day was observed for the first time. In 1973, Shorter College celebrated its 100th anniversary through special activities and traditions. In 1948, admission was opened to boys and the school was renamed Shorter College.

=== Further expansion, attempted break with Georgia Baptist Convention ===
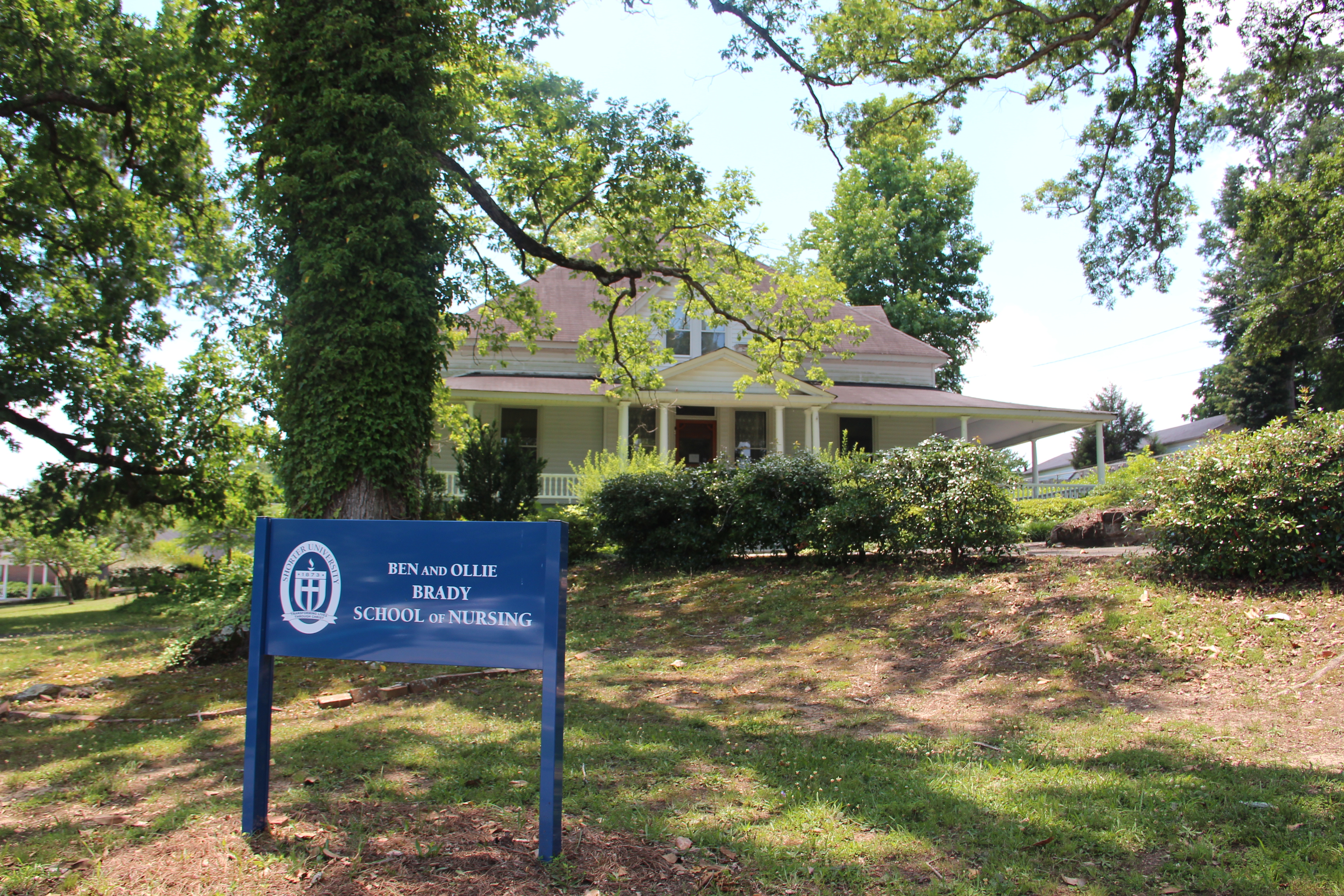
Ben and Ollie Brady School of Nursing

International programs began in the 1990s and the university expanded MBA programs and adult education programs with the establishment of the School of Professional Programs in the Atlanta area. The university dedicated the Winthrop-King Centre and created the Fitton Student Union when it converted the old gym into the facility. Shorter College constructed the Bass Apartments, the J. Robert Eubanks Welcome Center and the Robert H. Ledbetter baseball field.

In 2005, the college attempted to break away from the Georgia Baptist Convention. The Georgia Supreme Court, however, ruled that Shorter's board didn't have the authority to sever ties with the convention. On June 1, 2010, Shorter College changed its name to Shorter University to reflect the institution's growth and expansion. In December 2012, SACSCOC reaffirmed Shorter University's accreditation through 2022.

=== Personal lifestyle statement ===
In October 2011, the university introduced a requirement that its employees sign a "Statement of Faith" and a "Personal Lifestyle Statement" in which they agree to adhere to the following principles:

- loyal to the mission of Shorter University as a "Christ-centered" institution affiliated with the Georgia Baptist Convention.
- not engage in the use, sale, possession, or production of illegal drugs.
- reject as unacceptable all sexual activity not in agreement with the Bible, including, but not limited to, premarital sex, adultery, and homosexuality.
- not use alcoholic beverages in the presence of students, and abstain from serving, from using, and from advocating the use of alcoholic beverages in public and in settings in which students are present or are likely to be present.

The introduction of the lifestyle statement caused a sizable departure of university employees. An anonymous survey found that only 10 percent of faculty members favored signing the pledge and that only 12 percent planned to stay at the university, according to Inside Higher Ed.

== Campus ==
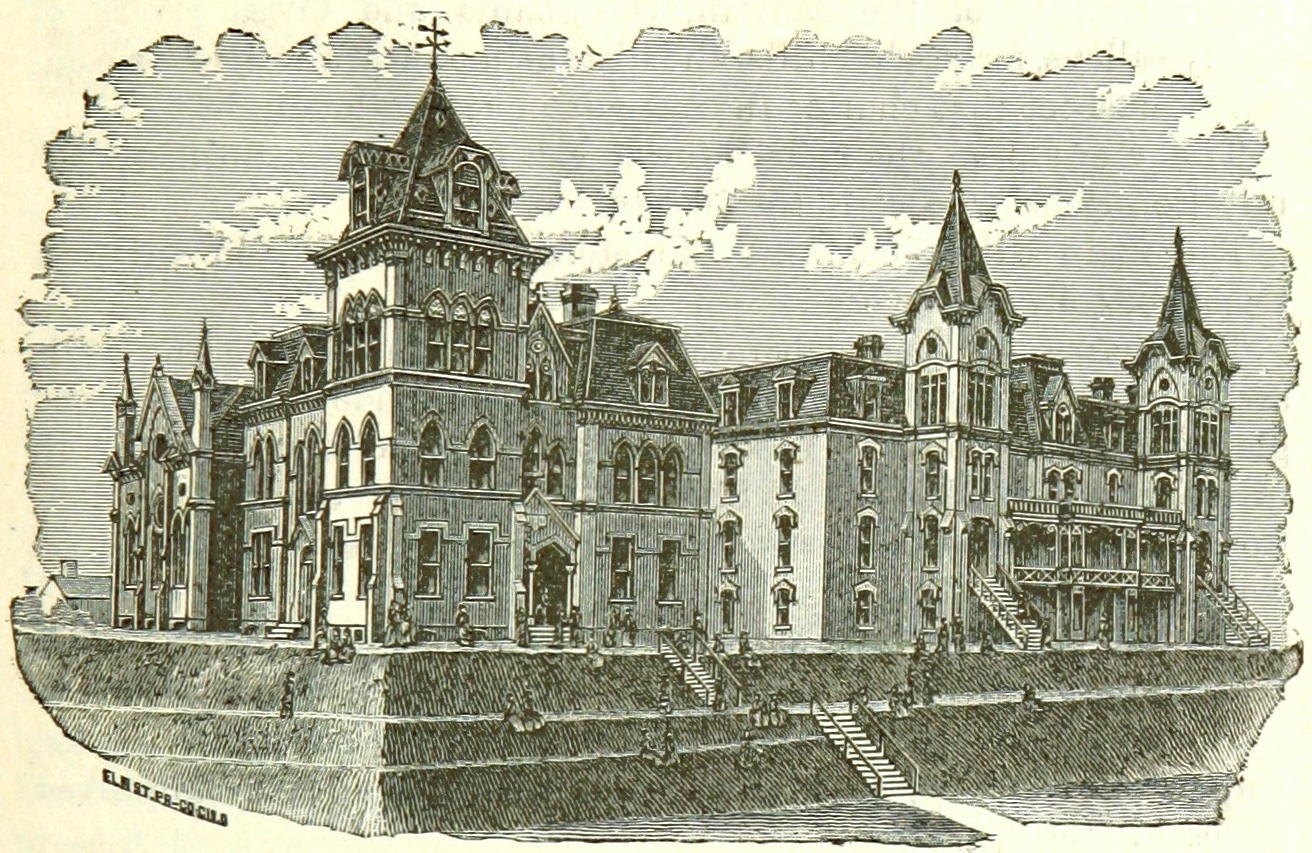
The college depicted in the 1885 book The Commonwealth of Georgia

The university is located on a 155-acre campus in Rome.

Shorter also offers online degrees for various associate's, bachelor's, master's programs.

== Academics ==
Shorter offers a liberal arts education in a Christ-centered environment. Shorter offers four associate degrees, bachelor's degrees in 46 fields of study, four master's degrees programs, and pre-professional programs. The university has four colleges, three schools, and other academic programs.

The university was granted an exception to Title IX in 2016, allowing the school to legally discriminate against LGBT students for religious reasons. It is ranked among the "Absolute Worst Campuses for LGBTQ Youth" by Campus Pride.

== Athletics ==
The Shorter athletic teams are called the Hawks. The university is a member of the NCAA Division II level of the National Collegiate Athletic Association (NCAA), primarily competing in Conference Carolinas since the 2024–25 academic year. with the exception of track & field, which they compete as an associate member of the Peach Belt Conference (PBC). The Hawks previously competed in the Gulf South Conference (GSC) for most of their sports from 2012–13 to 2023–24, as well as the Southern States Athletic Conference (SSAC; formerly known as Georgia–Alabama–Carolina Conference (GACC) until after the 2003–04 school year) of the National Association of Intercollegiate Athletics (NAIA) from 1999–2000 to 2011–12.

Shorter competes in 22 intercollegiate varsity sports: Men's sports include baseball, basketball, cheerleading, cross country, football, golf, lacrosse, soccer, tennis and track & field (indoor and outdoor); while women's sports include basketball, cheerleading, cross country, golf, lacrosse, soccer, softball, tennis, track & field (indoor and outdoor) and volleyball.

=== History ===
In May 2011, Shorter announced it would apply for membership into the NCAA at the Division II level. It was accepted into the NCAA reclassification process in July 2011 and joined the Gulf South Conference in July 2012. The university became a provisional member of NCAA Division II in the summer of 2013.

In its final year in the NAIA, Shorter University athletics finished ranked second in the final NAIA Learfield Sports Directors' Cup standings. Shorter's No. 2 final ranking was the highest in school history. The Hawks scored in 12 sports and claimed the softball and men's outdoor track and field championships – Shorter won an outdoor track title for the second straight year. Shorter also placed second in men's indoor track and field, third in men's basketball, fourth in women's indoor track and field and fifth in women's golf. Shorter's No. 2 final ranking is a culmination of a journey to the top of the NAIA that began to build momentum five years ago. The Hawks managed just 182.00 total points in 2006–07. Shorter ended the campaign ranked No. 87, and a 13th-place finish in softball is all that kept Shorter from finishing in the triple digits. That all changed a year later. Shorter shot up 66 spots to No. 21 with 509.25 points in the 2007–08 final standings behind a record spring that resulted in six programs accounting for 356.25 points. The Hawks dipped to No. 33 in 2008–09, but ascended to No. 11 in 2009–10, finishing for the first time ahead of perennial power and rival Lee University to end the year as the top rated member of the Southern States Athletic Conference. A fourth-place finish in women's outdoor track and field, fifth place in softball and sixth place in men's track and field paved the way for Shorter's highest Directors’ Cup finish to date that resulted in 587.25 points. Shorter climbed all the way to No. 3 last year thanks in large part to its indoor and outdoor double in men's track, setting the stage for a record setting 2011–12 year that helped Shorter depart the NAIA with a bang.

The Hawks placed third in 2010–11 on the shoulders of men's indoor and outdoor track and field national championships and 11th in 2009–10. In addition, track and field head coach, Scott Byrd, was named the NAIA Men's Indoor Track and Field National Coach of the Year after the indoor title, and won his second National Coach of the Year honor for the outdoor crown.

== Notable people ==
=== Notable alumni ===
- Vivian Louise Aunspaugh, Texas painter and art teacher
- Jamie Barton, opera singer
- I. M. Ibrahim (1941–2008), College soccer coach
- Emma Lewis Lipps, American botanist and professor of Earth sciences
- Marilyn Lloyd, Tennessee businesswoman and politician
- Martin Scott, businessman, educator, and politician
- Ed Stetzer, an American author, speaker, researcher, Baptist pastor, church planter, and Christian missiologist.
- Una Leonora Weatherby, American pteridologist and botanical illustrator.
- Moeed Yusuf, the 9th National Security Adviser to the Prime Minister of Pakistan

=== Notable faculty ===
- Eleanor Churchill Gibbs (1840-1925), educator, writer

=== Other notable persons ===
- Lamartine Griffin Hardman (1856-1937), 65th Governor of Georgia, served as president of the Board of Trustees.
