= West Rome High School =

Defunct high school in Georgia, United States

Coordinates: 34°16′23″N 85°13′50″W

Information
- School type: High school
- Established: 1958
- Closed: 1992
- School district: Rome City School District
- Colors: Kelly green, white, and silver

West Rome High School was an American public high school active from 1958 until 1992 in Rome, Georgia. It was part of the Rome City School District, and was succeeded by Rome High School.

== History ==
West Rome High School was a high school built in 1958. Its school colors were kelly green, white, and silver. East Rome and West Rome High schools were combined to form Rome High School in 1992.

West Rome was located at 2510 Redmond Circle. The West Rome Walmart now sits in the general area where West Rome Junior High School once stood. West Rome High was located where a Sam's Club stands now. West Rome High was a segregated all-white school until the Rome schools effected a desegregation plan in the late 1960s, transferring the students at all-black Main High School to West Rome and East Rome over a period of three years and closing Main High by 1970.

== Football ==
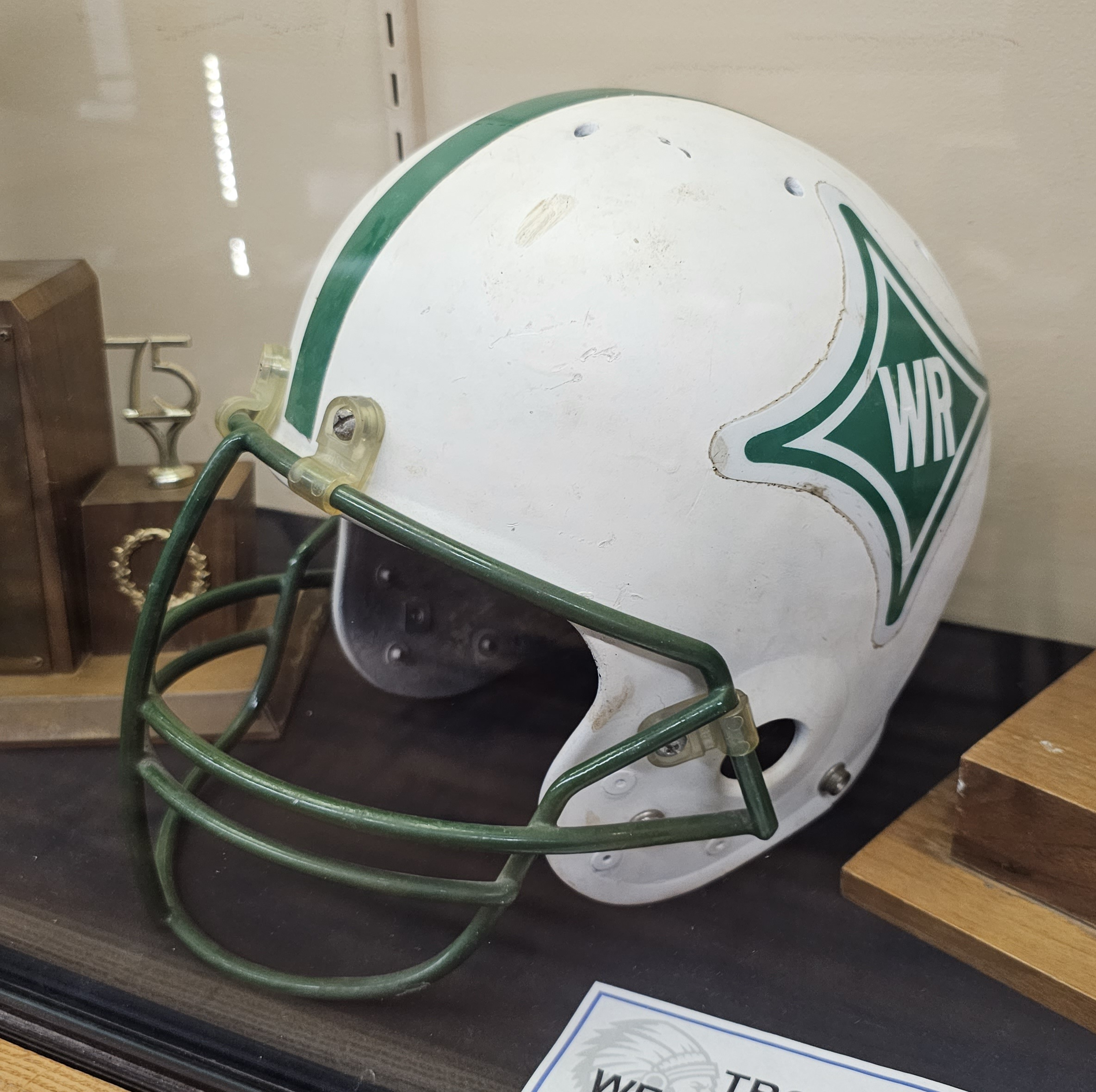
West Rome football helmet on display at the Rome Area History Museum

The West Rome Chieftains won five state titles and thirteen regional titles. Four of the state championships were won consecutively from 1982 to 1985, setting a state record. That state record was tied in 2010 by Buford High School. The Chieftains had 35 first-team all-state players and 60 all-state players.

Three West Rome players later played in the NFL, including Eric Floyd.

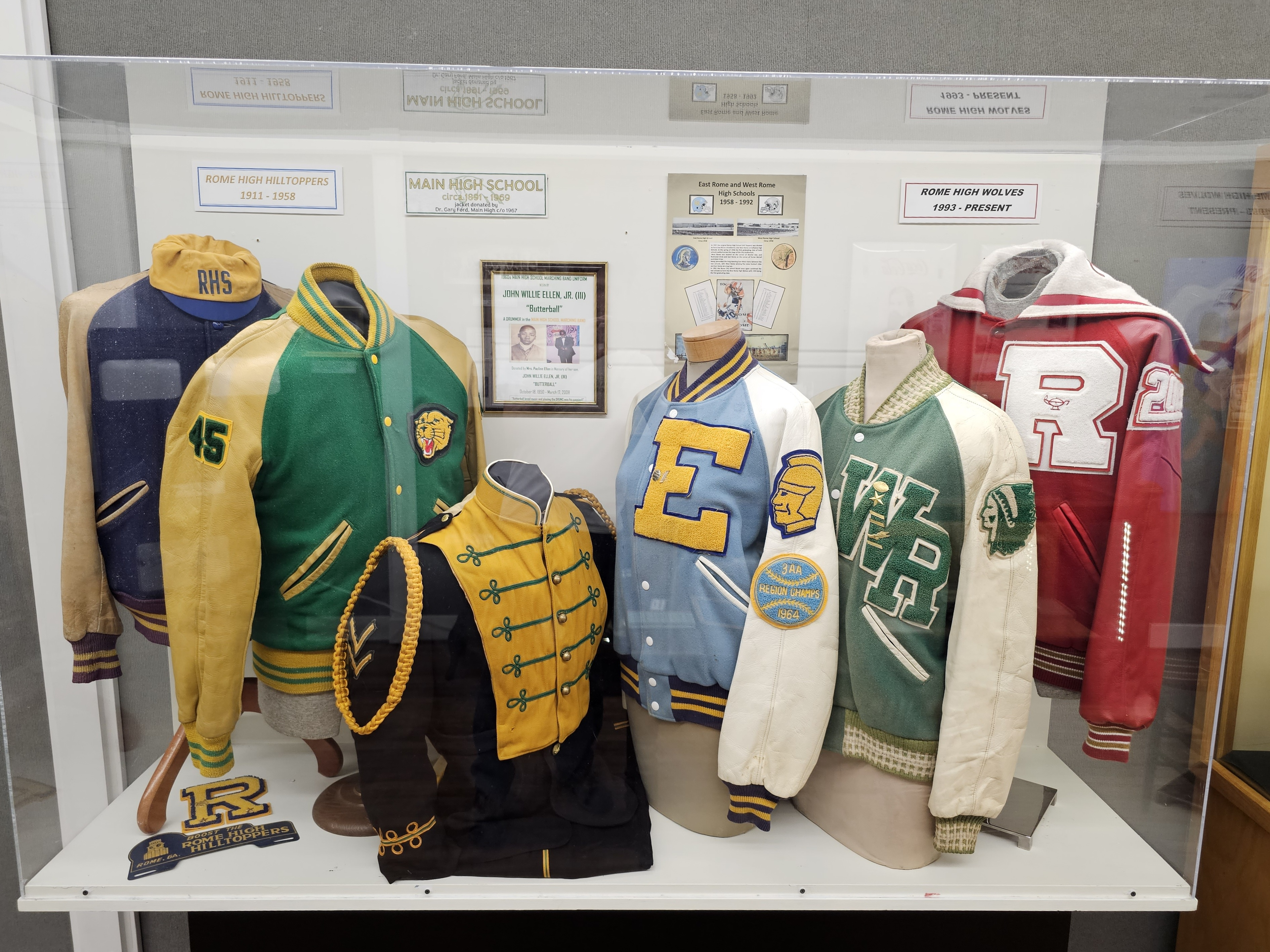
East Rome High School, and West Rome High School Letter jackets,.

== Notable alumni ==
- Eric Floyd, former NFL player also David Mccluskey former NFL player Mike Hogan with the Philadelphia Eagles was also a west Rome alumni
