= Old Shorter Hill =

Hill in Georgia, United States

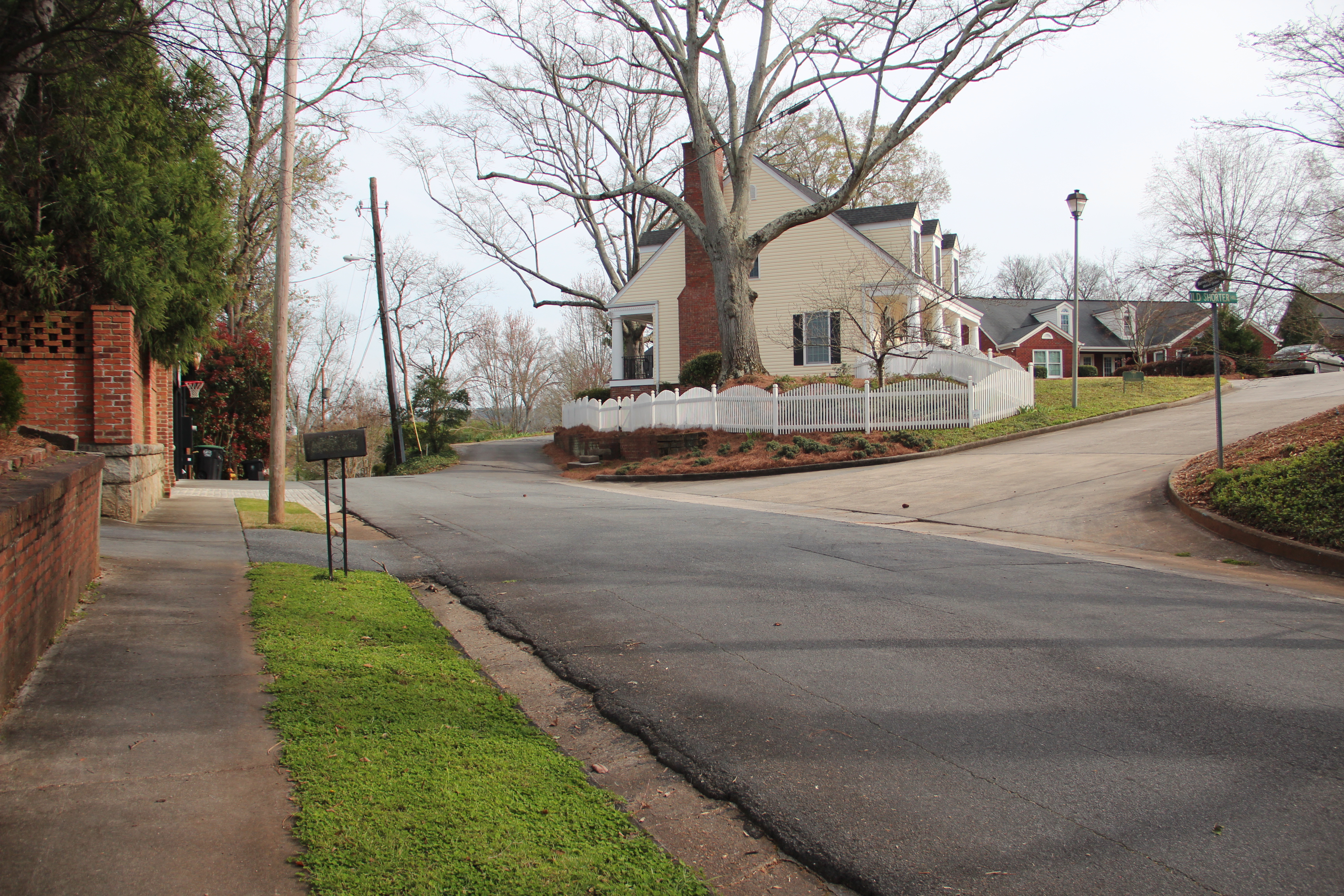
- College Avenue, near the summit of Old Shorter Hill

Highest point
- Elevation: 676 ft (206 m)
- Coordinates: 34.2514827°N 85.1693949°W

Geography
- Location within Georgia
- Location: Rome, Georgia, U.S.
- Topo map(s): USGS Rome North, GA

Climbing
- Easiest route: Drive

Old Shorter Hill is a summit in Rome, Georgia. With an elevation of 676 feet (206 m), Old Shorter Hill is the 910th highest summit in the US state of Georgia. It is considered to be one of the Seven Hills of Rome, Georgia.

The hill was originally known as Shelton Hill, named after the main landowner in the area. The Cherokee Baptist Female College was originally housed in facilities located on the hill when it was founded in 1873. In 1877, Cherokee Baptist Female College was renamed Shorter College, thanks to generous donations from Alfred and Martha Shorter. In 1910, the college moved from Shelton Hill to its current location outside of downtown Rome. The hill's name was changed to Old Shorter Hill upon the death of Martha Shorter. There is currently a cul-de-sac on the summit.
