= Elm Street Elementary School =

Public elementary school in Rome, Georgia, United States

Location
- 8 South Elm Street; Rome, Georgia 30165; United States
- Coordinates: 34°15′57″N 85°12′26″W

Information
- Type: Public
- School district: Rome City School District
- Principal: Lisa Strack
- Faculty: 44.20 (FTE)
- Grades: Pre-kindergarten – 6
- Enrollment: 569 (2022–23)
- Student to teacher ratio: 12.87
- Color(s): Red and gold
- Mascot: Wolves
- Website: ese.rcs.rome.ga.us

Elm Street Elementary School was one of the first schools to be built in a planned community. It is one of eight elementary schools in the Rome City School District in Georgia, United States. The naming convention for most of the streets in the community, and thus for the school, related to various types of trees. It is a public school that serves students in Pre-kindergarten through sixth grade.

Elm Street Elementary School was built in 1922 and is in use today. Lisa Strack is the principal.

McDonald's Corporation selected Elm Street Elementary as a site for one of its national recycling commercials because the school, after renovation, is old on the outside and new on the inside.

== Awards ==
Elm Street Elementary School has earned first place recognition in Georgia for its Response to Intervention program, a tactic employed by schools to help students struggling in a particular area of study.

Elm Street Elementary School made Adequate Yearly Progress (AYP) in 2009. It also won the Picturing America Award in 2009.

Elm Street Elementary received Georgia STEM Certification in 2017.

== Students and teachers ==
Student ethnicity:

- Hispanic 52%
- Black 32%
- White 15%
- Asian/Pacific Islander 2%

Gender:

- Female 52%
- Male 48%

Two teachers of Elm Street Elementary won the Teacher of the Year award twice in a row. Recent winner Connie DeVille was considered for the teacher of the year state competition.

== Specialty areas ==
- Music
- Physical education
- Special education
- Gifted and Esol programs
