= Adam Anderson (American football) =

American football player (born 1999)

No. 19
- Position: Linebacker

Personal information
- Born: October 19, 1999 (age 27)
- Listed height: 6 ft 5 in (1.96 m)
- Listed weight: 230 lb (104 kg)

Career information
- High school: Rome (Rome, Georgia)
- College: Georgia (2018–2021)
- Stats at ESPN

Adam O. Anderson (born October 19, 1999) is an American college football linebacker. He previously played college football for the Georgia Bulldogs.

== Early life ==
Anderson attended Rome High School in Rome, Georgia. As a senior in 2017, he was The Atlanta Journal-Constitution's high school football player of the year after recording 63 tackles, 10 sacks and an interception. He was selected to the 2018 U.S. Army All-American Bowl. A five-star recruit, Anderson committed to the University of Georgia to play college football.

== College career ==
As a true freshman at Georgia in 2018, Anderson played in all 14 games and had 16 tackles and 0.5 sacks. As a sophomore in 2019, he again played in all 14 games, recording six tackles and two sacks. As a junior in 2020, Anderson played in all 10 games and finished with 14 tackles and 6.5 sacks. He returned to Georgia for his senior season in 2021 rather than enter the 2021 NFL draft. Anderson finished the 2021 season with 32 tackles and five sacks.

== Arrests ==
On November 10, 2021, Anderson turned himself into police and was charged with felony rape after a 21-year-old woman accused him of raping her by forcing himself upon her while she was asleep in an apartment in Athens, Georgia, on October 29, 2021, which was reported to police the same day. Through his attorney, Anderson denied the accusation. Anderson was indefinitely suspended by the University of Georgia football team after they learned of the accusation on November 2, 2021. He was subsequently released on a $25,000 bond. Anderson was an apparent 2022 first round NFL draft pick before his arrest.

Subsequently, Anderson was charged a second time with felony rape after a previously unreported accusation was made by another 21-year-old woman that he raped her at his apartment near Watkinsville, Georgia, the same fall as the first accusation. Anderson denied this accusation also, and his attorney moved to have a single trial for both charges.

On July 24, 2023, Anderson was sentenced to one year in jail.
