= Eric Floyd (American football) =

American football player (born 1965)

Profile
- Position: Offensive lineman

Personal information
- Born: October 28, 1965 (age 61); Rome, Georgia, U.S.

Career information
- College: Auburn University

Career history
- 1988–1991: San Diego Chargers
- 1992–1993: Philadelphia Eagles
- 1995: Arizona Cardinals
- 1995: Denver Broncos
- Stats at Pro Football Reference

Eric Floyd (born October 28, 1965) is an American former professional football player who played offensive lineman for five seasons for the Arizona Cardinals, San Diego Chargers, and Philadelphia Eagles in the National Football League (NFL). He played college football for Auburn University after attending West Rome High School in Rome, Georgia.
