= Marshall Forest =

Forest in Floyd County, Georgia, USA

Marshall Forest Preserve
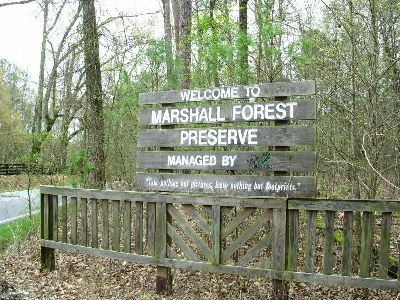
- Marshall Forest

- Location within Georgia
- Location: Floyd County, Georgia
- Nearest city: Rome
- Coordinates: 34°15′03″N 85°11′43″W
- Area: 311 acres (126 ha)
- Established: 1976
- Governing body: The Nature Conservancy
- Website: Official website

U.S. National Natural Landmark
- Designated: 1966

Marshall Forest is located in Floyd County, Georgia, United States, 5 miles (8.0 km) outside the Rome city limits. It is one of the few remaining old-growth forests in Northwest Georgia. Marshall Forest is referred to as the only virgin forest within city limits of any city in the US. The forest is 311 acres (126 ha). Trees in Marshall Forest range from 600–900 feet (180–270 m) in height. More than 300 species of plants, and fifty-five tree species live within the forest, together with numerous animals indigenous to the area. Part of the natural area is old-growth forest and recognized by the Old-Growth Forest Network.

== History ==
Once a part of the Cherokee Nation, the 311 acres (126 ha) were bought by the Marshall family in 1880. The land was passed down the Marshall family until it reached Maclean Marshall, naturalist and philanthropist, who had the land dedicated as a Natural National Landmark on October 12, 1966. Marshall Forest was the first Natural National Landmark in the state of Georgia. In 1976, 100 acres (40 ha) of forest and 120 acres (49 ha) of fields were given to The Nature Conservancy. In 1985, 70 acres (28 ha) were added to the forest on the Mt. Alto side. These parts were not part of the original purchase by the Marshall family. Now only 75 to 100 acres of the original forest remain uncut.

== Forest life ==
Marshall Forest supports more than 300 species of plants, including the endangered large-flowered skullcap. The forest houses the largest population of these flowers in the state of Georgia and the second largest population in the United States. Several kinds of mushrooms also grow in the forest. The forest contains 55 tree species, such as pine-oak, chestnut oak, and mixed hardwoods.

The forest is home to numerous indigenous animals, including frogs, salamanders, and snakes. There are at least six different species of snake in the forest. Dozens of kinds of birds also live here.

== Recreation ==
Marshall Forest contains five self-guided walking trails, primarily on the southwest side of the forest. The trails provide informational aides, including plant identification tags, and 20 stop-and-observe stations, with signs in both Braille and English. The Big Pine Braille Trail is made specifically for the visually impaired. The trails are not cut over, allowing the undergrowth to spread onto the pathway. Access to the forest is by appointment with the Nature Conservancy.

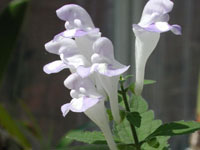
Endangered large flowering skullcap

== Management ==
The forest is managed in part by two groups – Friends of Marshall Forest and the Georgia Chapter of the Nature Conservancy. The Nature Conservancy, founded nationally in 1951, has managed Marshall Forest for five years. Volunteers assist in nonprofit work such as boundary marking and removal of invasive species.
